= Henri Tayau =

French opera singer

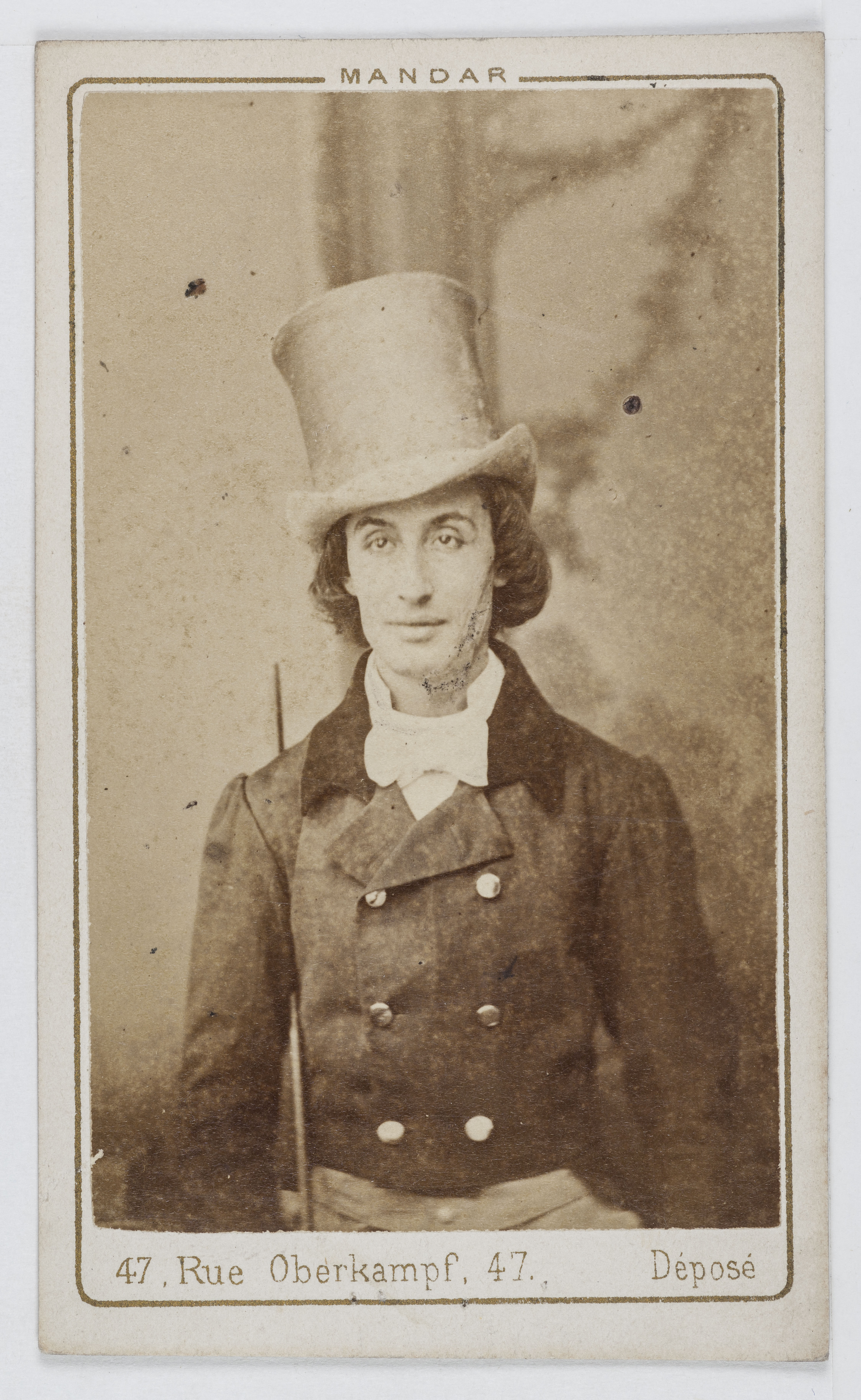
- Occupations: Operetta singer, actor, violinist

Henri Tayau was an operetta singer and actor, and violinist, who during a short but successful career performed many light tenor roles in opéra-bouffes of Offenbach, and created several roles, the most notable being that of Orphée in Offenbach's greatest success, Orphée aux Enfers.

== Life and career ==
While a violin teacher in Pau, Tayau took part in a charity concert for the destitute in that city, singing for the first time in public with great success. In Paris the following month, Offenbach engaged him on the basis of an audition consisting of a simple song (chansonnette). Tayau soon gained experience and popularity. His witty expressions, fine diction and acting led to eminence in the theatre.

Tayau made his debut at the Théâtre des Bouffes-Parisiens as Pâris, an amorous veterinary violinist, in Six demoiselles à marier, a one-act opérette by Delibes (November 1856) in which he also played the violin, and followed this early the next year with Ramasse-ta-Tête in the premiere of Croquefer by Offenbach, swiftly followed by the dancing master Tityre in Dragonette, and in May that year Arthur in Vent du soir, ou L'horrible festin, before the Bouffes tour to the British Isles.

In Les Petits Prodiges (1857), alongside a cello solo from Léonce and one on the bassoon by Desiré, Tayau was required to execute 'variations excentriques' (eccentric variations) on his violin. Tayau sang at the competition stage in the Lecocq version of Le Docteur Miracle which won the operetta prize jointly with a setting by Bizet in a prize contest organized by Offenbach in 1857. He performed the title role in Hignard's M. de Chimpanzé in 1858 at the Bouffes in which he also (as the monkey) performed gymnastic movements.

He sang Flavio / Florville in Offenbach's production of Rossini's Il signor bruschino at the Bouffes in 1858. In April 1858, he created another role: Guido in La chatte métamorphosée en femme at the Bouffes. At this time he also appeared in concert, for instance at the Sociétés savantes circle, singing chansonettes.

During a spring visit to the Grand-Théâtre in Marseille, during which the Bouffes company performed 23 operas by Offenbach and other composers, Tayau, who was also one of the stage managers, was noted as "premier amoureux comique" (leading comic lover), who undertook his dual role as an "intelligent artist", as well as his violin playing.

He created the title role in Orphée aux Enfers in 1858, actually playing the violin in the 'Duo de Concerto' in Act I "Ah! C'est ainsi... C'est déplorable, c'est affroyable", and took part in a revival of the piece in 1866. In April 1860 he sang Orphée in the command performance for the Emperor at the Théâtre-Italien. With the Bouffes on tour in the summer of 1860 he sang Orphée, and Tarabisco in L'Épine's Croquignolle XXXVI in Lyon.

Subsequent premieres included La Polka des sabots in 1859, a one-act opérette by Varney (conductor of the Bouffes orchestra), and Monsieur de Bonne-Étoile, another one-act opérette, by Delibes, in 1860, alongside Marchand, Gaillat and Cico.

In 1864 Tayau sang Raflafla in Offenbach's Mesdames de la Halle at the Bouffes-Parisiens. The following year he sang Sérapion in the "parade égyptienne" Le Boeuf Apis by Delibes (possibly a parody of Rossini's Moïse or Méhul's Joseph) and was in a revival of Les Petits du premier by Albert. In 1867 he sang Prince Belazor in Peau-d'Âne by Clairville at the Gaîté.

Alongside Schneider and other company singers he took part in a tour to twenty towns in Ireland, Scotland and England in 1870 organized by the director of the Théâtre de la Porte Saint-Martin. The tour began on 14 March in Dublin, with a repertoire consisting of La Grande-Duchesse, Barbe-Bleue, Orphée, and La Périchole.

== Family ==
Tayau's daughter was the violinist and violin teacher Marie Tayau (1855–1892), who won a first prize at the Conservatoire aged 12, and later had a full career on the concert platform. She organized popular chamber music concerts at the Trocadéro, and gave the premiere of Fauré's Violin Sonata No. 1 in 1877.
