= Andrea Zsadon =

Hungarian soprano and actress (born 1946)

Andrea Zsadon (born 18 October 1946) is a Hungarian soprano and actress active in both opera and operetta. During her career as a singer she performed frequently at the Vienna Volksoper and the Budapest Operetta Theatre. Zsadon was the recipient of the Mari Jászai Prize in 1987 and the Knight's Cross of the Order of Merit of the Republic of Hungary in 2008.

Zsadon was born in Debrecen and is married to the singer and operetta director Tibor Szolnoki. When they both retired from the Budapest Operetta Theatre in 1992, they founded their own operetta ensemble, Operettszínházból.

Amongst Zsadon's film and television appearances is Az Élet muzsikája (The Music of Life), a 1984 biographical film about the Hungarian composer Emmerich Kálmán.

== Repertory ==
Composer	Opera	Role(s)
Giacomo Puccini	Manon Lescaut	Manon Lescaut
Giuseppe Verdi	Nabucco	Anna
Ruggero Leoncavallo	Pagliacci	Nedda
Gaetano Donizetti	Don Pasquale	Norina
Wolfgang Amadeus Mozart	Le nozze di Figaro	Countess Rosina; Cherubino
Wolfgang Amadeus Mozart	Die Entführung aus dem Serail	The three ladies
Wolfgang Amadeus Mozart	Der Schauspieldirektor	Madame Krone
Ferenc Erkel	Hunyadi László	Mátyás Hunyadi
Ralph Benatzky	Der König mit dem Regenschirm	Margot
Emmerich Kálmán	Gräfin Mariza	Countess Mariza; Lisa
Emmerich Kálmán	Die Csárdásfürstin	Sylva Varescu
Emmerich Kálmán	Die Zirkusprinzessin	Princess Fedora Palinska
Emmerich Kálmán	Der Zigeunerprimas	Countess Irini
Emmerich Kálmán	Das Veilchen vom Montmartre	Ninon
Johann Strauss II	Die Fledermaus	Rosalinde; Adele
Johann Strauss II	Eine Nacht in Venedig	Annina; Agricola Barbaruccio
Johann Strauss II	The Gypsy Baron	Saffi
Kacsóh Pongrác	János Vitéz	The Princess
Paul Abraham	Viktoria und ihr Husar	Countess Viktoria
Paul Abraham	Ball im Savoy	Tangolita
Franz Lehár	Das Land des Lächelns	Lisa; Princess Mi
Franz Lehár	Die lustige Witwe	Hanna Glawari
Franz Lehár	Zigeunerliebe	Zórika
Franz Lehár	Der Graf von Luxemburg	Angèle Didier
Jenő Huszka	Mária fôhadnagy	Mária; Antónia
Jacques Offenbach	Le mariage aux lanternes	Fanchette
Jacques Offenbach	Orphée aux enfers	Eurydice
Jacques Offenbach	Un mari à la porte	Rosita
Jacques Offenbach	Monsieur et Madame Denis	Lucile du Coudrai
Jacques Offenbach	La Grande-Duchesse de Gérolstein	Eszti
Leo Fall	Madame Pompadour	Madame de Pompadour
Victor Jacobi	Szibill	Sybill
Victor Jacobi	Leányvásár	Lucy
Richard Rodgers	Carousel	Julie Jordan
Franz von Suppé	Boccaccio	Fiametta
Franz von Suppé	Die schöne Galathée	Galatea
Pierre Barillet	Cactus Flower	Madame Chouchou
Leonard Bernstein	West Side Story	Maria

== Recordings ==
- János Vitéz (music by Pongrác Kacsoh, lyrics by Jeno Heltai), Chorus and Orchestra of the Municipal Operetta Theatre, Géza Oberfrank conductor; Qualiton; SLPX 16619 (1980)
- Zirkusprinzessin (music by Emmerich Kálmán, libretto by Alfred Grünwald and Julius Brammer), chorus and ballet of the Budapest operetta, Katalin Varadi and Pal Ronai, conductors (1991; archival recording OCLC 793489459)
