= Daphnis and Chloe (disambiguation) =

Daphnis and Chloe is a work from the 2nd century AD by the Greek author Longus. This story is the basis of several works of art:

- Daphnis et Chloé, a 1747 pastorale héroïque by Joseph Bodin de Boismortier
- Daphnis et Chloé (Offenbach), an 1860 opérette by Jacques Offenbach
- Daphne and Chloe, an 1879 painting by Filipino painter Juan Luna
- Daphnis et Chloé, a 1912 symphonie chorégraphique by Maurice Ravel, choreographed by Michel Fokine
- Daphnis and Chloe (film), a 1931 silent film by Orestis Laskos
- Daphne and Chloe, a 1951 ballet by Sir Frederick Ashton to Maurice Ravel's music

== See also ==
- Daphnis et Chloé (disambiguation)
