= Vent du soir, ou L'horrible festin =

Opérette-bouffe by Jacques Offenbach

Jacques Offenbach by Nadar, c. 1860s

Vent-du-soir ou l'horrible festin is a one-act opérette-bouffe with music by Jacques Offenbach and a libretto by Philippe Gille, which was premiered at the Bouffes-Parisiens Salle Choiseul, on 16 May 1857.

== Background ==
The work was the first collaboration between Philippe Gille and Offenbach, and the start of a friendship between them which endured until the death of the latter. It also marked the first appearance with Offenbach of the singer-actor Désiré, who went on to create many roles in the composer's works.

Vent du soir was a success, and was revived in Paris and also performed in Brussels and Vienna. A production in Swedish was presented in 2003 in Stockholm by Teater travers, and in Florence, Italy in November 2016.

== Roles ==
Roles	Voice type	Premiere cast, 16 May 1857 (Conductor: Jacques Offenbach)
Vent-du-soir, king of the Gros-Loulous	baritone	Désiré
Lapin-courageux, king of the Papas-Toutous	tenor	Léonce
Arthur, son of Lapin-courageux	tenor	Tayau
Atala, daughter of Vent-du-soir	soprano	Garnier
Pas-Peigné-du-Tout, cook	mute role	

== Synopsis ==
On an Oceanic island, Vent-du-soir receives a visit from a neighbouring chief Lapin-courageux. Both men get on very well, as they had eaten the other's wife. Vent-du-soir puts on a good spread for his guest.

Atala, daughter of Vent-du-soir, meanwhile, has fallen in love with the ship-wrecked stranger Arthur, a hair-dresser of the rue Vivienne.

As the day's hunt was fruitless, Vent-du-soir decides that he will have to sacrifice Arthur, but when they are at table, Lapin-courageux realizes that they have eaten his lost son, as he can hear the musical watch he gave his son ringing in his stomach.

Luckily the diners learn that in fact they have been served a bear, in whose skin Arthur had been hiding. All ends happily and Atala and Arthur are able to marry.

== Musical numbers ==
- Ouverture (representing a storm)
- Couplets (Atala) "Petit bébé"
- Couplets et duetto (Arthur, Atala) "Mon front n'a pas"
- Trio (Atala, Arthur, Vent du soir) "Grands dieux!"
- Trio (Atala, Lapin-courageux, Vent-du-soir) "Gloire aux Papas-Toutous"
- Trio (Atala, Lapin-courageux, Vent-du-soir) and chanson nègre (Lapin-courageux) "Ô fête incomplète"
- Duo, trio et quatuor (Vent-du-soir, Lapin-courageux; Atala, Arthur) "Ciel! Ciel! Ciel!"
- Final (all) "Que mon sort est doux"
