= Alix Bressant =

French novelist and actor

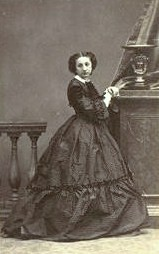
- Born: 21 September 1838; Paris, France
- Died: 18 December 1909 (71 years); Nice, France
- Occupation: Novelist Actor
- Family: Father: Jean Baptiste Prosper Bressant Mother: Augustine Élisa Dupont Husband: Mikhaïl Viktorovitch Kotchoubeï

Eugénie Alix Bressant, known as Alix Bressant, was a French novelist and actor.

Eugénie Alix Bressant was the daughter of Prosper and Elisabeth Bressant, both actors. She made her debut in October 1859 at Théâtre du Vaudeville, in Les Dettes du Cœur, a comedy by Auguste Maquet. Then she played from 1861 to 1865 at the Théâtre du Gymnase Marie Bell before going on tour in Russia.

In 1867, while a resident at the Mikhailovsky Theatre, she married Prince Mikhaïl Viktorovitch Kotchoubeï in Saint Petersburg, with whom she had five children. Widowed in 1873, she returned to settle in Paris and five years later married Baron Paul-Adrien d'Artigues, prefect of Ariège.

After her first marriage, Alix Bressant stopped performing on stage and devoted herself to literature. She had several works published, first under her maiden name, then under that of Princess Kotchoubey and finally under that of Madame d'Artigues.

== Books ==
- An Outcast, 1865
- Gabriel Pinson, 1867
- Oh! tell him, 1871
- The Manuscript of Mademoiselle Camille, 1874
- Letters from women: 1881
