= M. Choufleuri restera chez lui le . . . =

Opéra bouffe, or operetta, by Jacques Offenbach and the Duc de Morny

Jacques Offenbach by Nadar, c. 1860s

M. Choufleuri restera chez lui le... (Mr. Cauliflower will be at home on... ) is an opéra bouffe, or operetta, in one act by Jacques Offenbach and the Duc de Morny (under the pseudonym "M. de St Rémy"). The French libretto is also credited to Morny, though Ludovic Halévy, Hector-Jonathan Crémieux, and Morny's secretary Ernest L'Épine probably contributed to the text as well.

The plot provided many opportunities for Offenbach to indulge in his lighthearted musical parodies of well-known opera melodies and formulas, especially a grand trio in which Italian belcanto is imitated and a comic solo for the manservant. Also, the young lovers secretly communicate using musical quotes.

== Performance history ==
M. Choufleuri was first performed privately as part of a musical and theatrical evening from the Bouffes Parisiens company at the parliamentary Présidence du Corps Législatif, Palais Bourbon, Paris on 31 May 1861, which also included the overture to Mari sans le savoir by Morny, and a scene played by Madeleine Brohan, Bressant and Barré from the Comédie-Française, in the presence of Emperor Napoleon III. The first public performance was given at the Théâtre des Bouffes Parisiens, Paris on 14 September 1861.

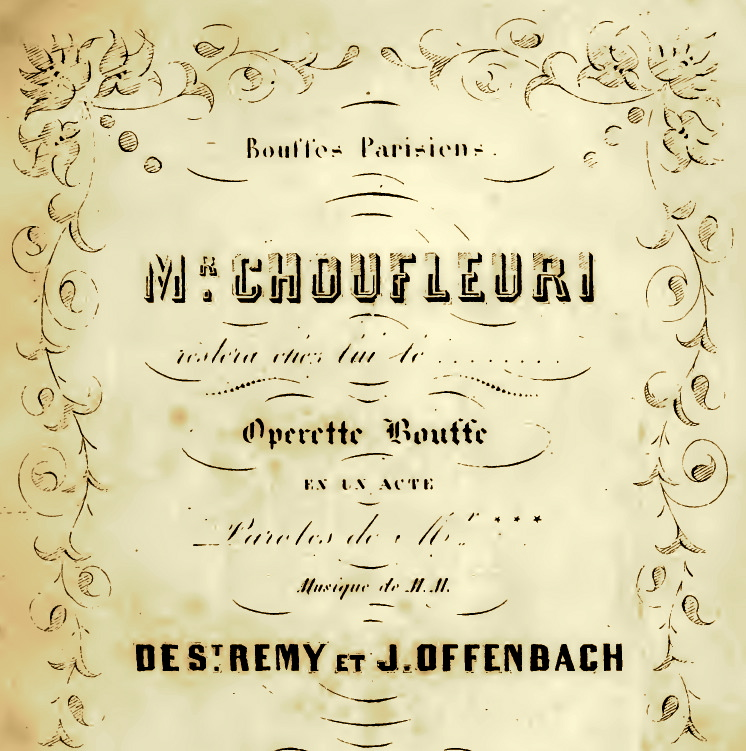
Cover of score, 1861

The Duc de Morny was the Emperor's illegitimate half-brother and a senior government official, which may explain some of the laudatory reviews of his work. In Le Figaro, however, Henri Rochefort wrote:

How fortunate is this author whose participation in a frightful coup d'etat has saved him from the necessity of living by the pen! If one of us dared bring such an inept production to a theatrical director, he would forthwith have been seized and thrown into the den of the theater's old hag ushers, whose instructions would have been to beat him to death with footstools.

The one-hour work is still performed, especially by amateur companies, since it is not particularly challenging vocally. M. Choufleuri restera chez lui le… was performed as part of a triple bill entitled ‘Vive Offenbach’ with Pomme d'api and Mesdames de la Halle at the Paris Opéra-Comique in December 1979, revived the following year and in 1983, with a recording in 1982. There was a production at La Monnaie, Brussels under Patrick Davin in February 2007.

== Roles ==
Role	Voice type	Premiere Cast, May 31, 1861 (Conductor: Jacques Offenbach)
Choufleuri	baritone	Désiré
Ernestine, his daughter	soprano	Lise Tautin
Chrysodule Babylas, Ernestine's admirer	tenor	Pierre-Armand Potel
Petermann, Choufleuri's Flemish manservant	tenor	Georges Dejon-Marchand
Balandard, a henpecked husband	tenor	Debruille-Bache
Madame Balandard, a dominating wife	tenor	Léonce
Small chorus of guests

== Synopsis ==
Place: Paris
Time: January 24, 1833

The newly-rich but culturally ignorant M. Choufleuri invites the upper crust of Paris to a private party and "musical soiree" (at his bourgeois drawing-room, furnished in vulgar taste) by celebrated real life Italian opera singers: soprano Henriette Sontag, tenor Giovanni Battista Rubini, and baritone Antonio Tamburini. All three become indisposed at the last minute.

In the meantime, Choufleuri's daughter, Ernestine, has been secretly seeing a young bassoonist, composer and singer, Chrysodule Babylas. When she asked her father to invite the young man to the soiree, Choufleuri had refused, saying that a poor musician is not a worthy suitor for her. Now, Ernestine saves the day by impersonating Sontag and insisting that Babylas impersonate Rubini, and that Choufleuri himself masquerade as Tamburini (after all, the young couple explain, baritones don't need to speak much, they just oom-pah-pah – but Choufleuri should try to stay on key).

Despite Choufleuri's lazy and incompetent Flemish servant, Petermann, the deception works – the guests are impressed by the great "Italian" singers (who all speak in Italian accents and sing in pig-Italian), and Choufleuri rewards Babylas with his daughter's hand in marriage (especially since Babylas has demanded this, plus 50,000 Francs dowry, in order to keep quiet about the fraud).

== Recordings ==
- Recordings may be found on operadis-opera-discography.org.uk
