= Les bergers =

Opéra comique with music by Jacques Offenbach

Jacques Offenbach by Nadar, c. 1860s

Les bergers is a three-act opéra comique of 1865 with music by Jacques Offenbach. The French libretto was by Hector Crémieux and Philippe Gille. It belongs to the group of more serious works, such as Barkouf, Robinson Crusoé, Vert-Vert and above all Fantasio which became neglected as his contemporaries pigeon-holed Offenbach as simply an amusing composer of opéra bouffe.

== Performance history ==
The premiere of Les bergers took place on 11 December 1865 at the Bouffes-Parisiens, Paris. It was generally well received by critics but did not run to great success, having to bear comparison with La belle Hélène, Offenbach's most recent hit. The work was staged, in German, in Vienna in 1866.

Before the opening, Le Figaro published a letter written by Offenbach to Henri de Villemessant, setting out his artistic aims with the new work. He described the structure of the piece, as a "series of pastorals", with the first set in antiquity and working on the theme of Pyramus and Thisbe, the second set in the time and style of Watteau and Louis XV, and in the third act Offenbach "sought to represent Courbet in music".

The overture contains a theme on the oboe which is the first version of "Au Mont Ida" from La belle Hélène.

The first act, using the title Myriame et Daphné (the names of the lovers), was staged as a curtain-raiser at the premiere of Massenet's Thérèse in Monte-Carlo in 1907; with Maggie Teyte in a principal role. Faris comments that the 18th-century pastiche "is skilfully done. Offenbach creates gavotte-like, courtly elegance with an austerly simple rhythmic accompaniment".

== Roles ==
Role	Voice type	Premiere cast, 11 December 1865 (Conductor: Jacques Offenbach)
Alphésibée	tenor	Gourdon
Thyrsis	baritone	Garrait
Palémon	bass	Duvernoy
Chryséa	soprano	Sorac
Myriame	tenor	Berthelier
Daphné	soprano	Irma Marié
Premier Berger	soprano	Pelva
Deuxième Berger	soprano	Halbleid
Troisième Berger	soprano	Valter
Quatrième Berger	soprano	Leriche
Éros	mezzo-soprano	Zulma Bouffar
La Marquise	soprano	Frasey-Berthelier
Colin	tenor	Berthelier
L’Intendant	mezzo-soprano	Zulma Bouffar
Le Bailli	baritone	Tacova
Le Marquis de Fonrose	tenor	Léonce
Nicette	soprano	Bonelli
Annette	soprano	Irma Marié
La Rouge	soprano	Irma Marié
La Sincère	soprano	Lise Tautin
Nicot	tenor	Berthelier
Jeannet	mezzo-soprano	Zulma Bouffar
Veautendon	baritone	Désiré
Le Menu	tenor	Gobin
Chorus: Bergers et Bergères, Chasseurs

== Synopsis ==
=== Act 1 – L'Idylle (The Idyll) ===
The first act takes place in a sacred wood in Arcadia. Palémon aims to commit his son Myriame (a shepherd) to Apollo; Chryséa hopes to vow her daughter, Daphné (a shepherdess) to Diane. Myriame and Daphné are in love and with the help of Alphésibée arrange a secret meeting in a wood where hunters are pursuing a she-wolf. Myriame mistakenly believes that the hunters have killed his love and ends his life, but Éros appears and saves the young man, deciding that the two lovers will go through different ages.

=== Act 2 – Le Trumeau (The Trumeau) ===
In the second act they are in the park of a mansion at the time of Louis XV; Myriame is now Colin and Daphné is Annette. Éros has been sent down to the world by Jupiter in the form of a steward. The marquis returns home to his wife but both are flirting with the young couple; intrigue follows. When he is accused of presiding over disorder, the steward transforms into Éros and is protected by cupids as the curtain falls.

=== Act 3 – Le Bergerie réaliste (The realist pastoral) ===
The final act is introduced by a realist pastoral symphony. Daphné is now the shepherdess La Rouge who is intended for Nicot-la-Braise - Myriame. La Rouge's friend La Sincère has been promised to Le Menu. Meanwhile, Éros is in the form of a wily rascal, Jeannet. All are offered a wedding feast by the generous landowner Vautendon during which Jeannet tries to stir up jealousy among the lovers. In the finale Éros is perched on the fatted calf of Vautendon and the three visitors from antiquity arise into the heavens.

== Recordings ==
Excerpts have appeared on the anthologies Ballade Symphonique Offenbach au menu! and Entre Nous.
