= Daphnis et Chloé (disambiguation) =

Daphnis et Chloé is the name of two classical compositions based on the story of Daphnis and Chloe:

- Daphnis et Chloé, a 1912 ballet with music by Maurice Ravel
- Daphnis et Chloé (Offenbach), an 1860 operetta by Jacques Offenbach

See also Daphnis and Chloe (disambiguation)
