= Désiré (baritone) =

French opera singer

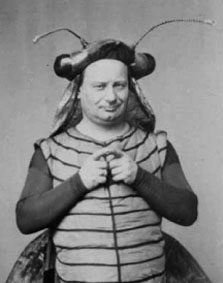
Désiré as Jupiter in Orpheus in the Underworld at the Bouffes-Parisiens in 1858

Amable Courtecuisse (French pronunciation: [amabl kuʁtəkɥis]; 29 December 1823 – 7 September 1873), whose stage name was Désiré ([deziʁe]), was a French baritone, who is particularly remembered for creating many comic roles in the works of the French operetta composer Jacques Offenbach.

== Life and career ==
He was born in Lille or a nearby village of it, and studied the bassoon, singing, and declamation at the Lille Conservatory. His first appearances were at small theatres in Belgium and northern France beginning in 1845.

In 1847, he arrived at the Théâtre Montmartre in Paris where he met Hervé. He asked Hervé to provide him with a musical sketch (drawn from Cervantes' novel Don Quixote), in which the tall and thin Hervé as the Don was pitted against the short and plump Désiré as Sancho Pança. The sketch inspired what was later dubbed the first French operetta, Hervé's Don Quichotte et Sancho Pança, which premiered in 1848 at Adolphe Adam's Théâtre National at the Cirque Olympique, but with Joseph Kelm, instead of Désiré, as Sancho Pança.

In subsequent years Désiré appeared in operetta theatres in Lille, Brussels, and Marseille. He also became a star at Hervé's Parisian Folies-Concertantes (later the Folies-Nouvelles).

Finally he was engaged by Jacques Offenbach for the Théâtre des Bouffes-Parisiens, where Désiré made his brilliantly successful debut on 16 May 1857 in Vent-du-Soir, ou l'horrible festin. Thereafter until 1873 he remained one of the star actors of Offenbach's company, appearing in many of the premieres of Offenbach's most famous operettas. His greatest success was his unforgettable portrayal of the role of Jupiter in Orpheus in the Underworld, which premiered on 21 October 1858.

Désiré also appeared at other Parisian theatres, including the Théâtre des Variétés, the Théâtre du Palais-Royal, and the Athénée-Musicale, and also worked with the French operetta composer Charles Lecocq.

At the end of his career Désiré became increasingly addicted to alcohol and died, abandoned and in poverty, in Asnières-sur-Seine. He died on 7 September 1873, aged 49, in his house in Courbevoie. A large congregation consisting much of theatrical Paris (including Ludovic Halévy, Hector Crémieux, Charles Lecocq, Berthelier, Léonce, Hyacinthe, Baron and Anna Judic), attended his funeral on 10 September.

== Roles created ==
Works by Offenbach unless otherwise noted:

- 1857: Vent-du-Soir in Vent du soir, ou L’horrible festin
- 1857: Pigeonneau in Une demoiselle en loterie
- 1858: Mme Madou in Mesdames de la Halle
- 1858: Dig-dig in La chatte métamorphosée en femme
- 1858: Jupiter in Orpheus in the Underworld (in French)
- 1859: Le marquis de Criquebœuf in L'omelette à la Follembuche by Léo Delibes
- 1859: Golo in Geneviève de Brabant
- 1860: Pan in Daphnis et Chloé
- 1860: Grétry in Le musicien de l'avenir
- 1861: Maître Fortunio in La chanson de Fortunio
- 1861: Cornarino Cornarini in Le pont des soupirs
- 1861: Choufleuri in M. Choufleuri restera chez lui le . . .
- 1862: Adolphe Dunanan in Le voyage de MM Dunanan père & fils
- 1862: Cristobal in Bavard et bavarde
- 1863: Fritzchen in Lischen et Fritzchen
- 1863: Bertolucci in Il signor Fagotto
- 1864: Jol-Hiddin in Les géorgiennes
- 1864: Cabochon in Jeanne qui pleure et Jean qui rit
- 1864: Van Croquesec in Le serpent à plumes by Delibes
- 1865: Vautendon in Les bergers
- 1866: undetermined role in Didon by G. Blangini
- 1868: Tien-Tien in Fleur-de-Thé by Charles Lecocq
- 1869: undetermined role in L’écossais de Chatou by Léo Delibes
- 1869: Cabriolo in La princesse de Trébizonde
- 1869: Rafaël in La diva
- 1869: undetermined role in Le rajah de Mysore by Lecocq
- 1869: Cabriolo in La princesse de Trébizonde (revised 3-act version)
- 1871: Balabrelock in Boule-de-Neige
- 1872: Raab in La timbale d'argent by Léon Vasseur
- 1873: undetermined role in La petite reine by Vasseur

In 1867 he also appeared at the Théâtre des Nouveautés as Sganarelle in La statue du commandeur.
