= Marguerite Macé-Montrouge =

French singer and actress

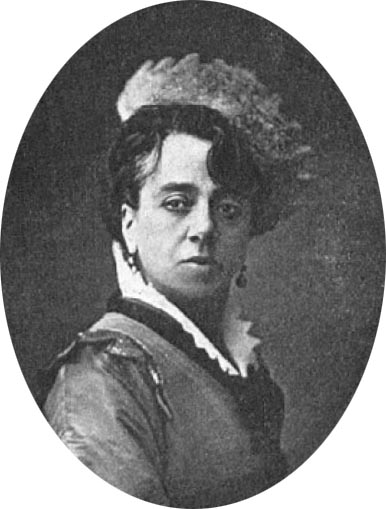
Marguerite Macé-Montrouge at the Théâtre de l'Athénée (1877)

Marguerite Macé-Montrouge (born Victoire Macé on 24 March 1836, died 26 November 1898 in Paris), became a professional actress at the age of 14, and was an early member of Offenbach's troupe, before enjoying a long stage career in Paris and elsewhere.

== Life and career ==
Brought up by her grandmother in the Batignolles she studied at the Paris Conservatoire under Jean-Baptiste Provost from 1848 to 1850. She appeared at the École lyrique in La Fille terrible and La Veuve de quinze ans making her debut at the Théâtre du Gymnase in 1850 where she spent three years playing travesty roles.

For Offenbach she sang in the premieres of Entrez Messieurs, Mesdames in 1855 (Titi), Une nuit blanche in 1855 (Fanchette), Le rêve d'une nuit d'été in 1855 (Rosita), La chatte métamorphosée en femme in 1858 (Marianne), Orphée aux enfers in 1858 (L'opinion publique) and Le beau Pâris at the Eldorado in 1869 (Hélène). She also created Véronique in Bizet's Le docteur miracle (1857).

In 1860, along with Zulma Bouffar, she travelled to Liege, returning in 1862 to Paris at the Théâtre de la Porte Saint-Martin in Pied de mouton. She then toured to Brussels, where she met her future husband (Montrouge), who was singing at the Atelier, returning to the French capital for a series of successes at the Folies Marigny.

After touring to Cairo with her husband, and singing a wide operetta repertoire there with him, she joined the troupe of the Théâtre de l'Athénée in Paris.

Later creations included Joséphine vendue par ses soeurs in 1886 (Madame Jacob) and Miss Helyett in 1890 (La Sérona).

Macé-Montrouge was the director of 'La Tertulia', a café-concert in the rue de Rochechouart from October 1871 to September 1873. One of her late triumphs was in L'Hôtel du libre échange by Feydeau at the Théâtre des Nouveautés in 1894.
