= Marie Tayau =

French musician (1855–1892)

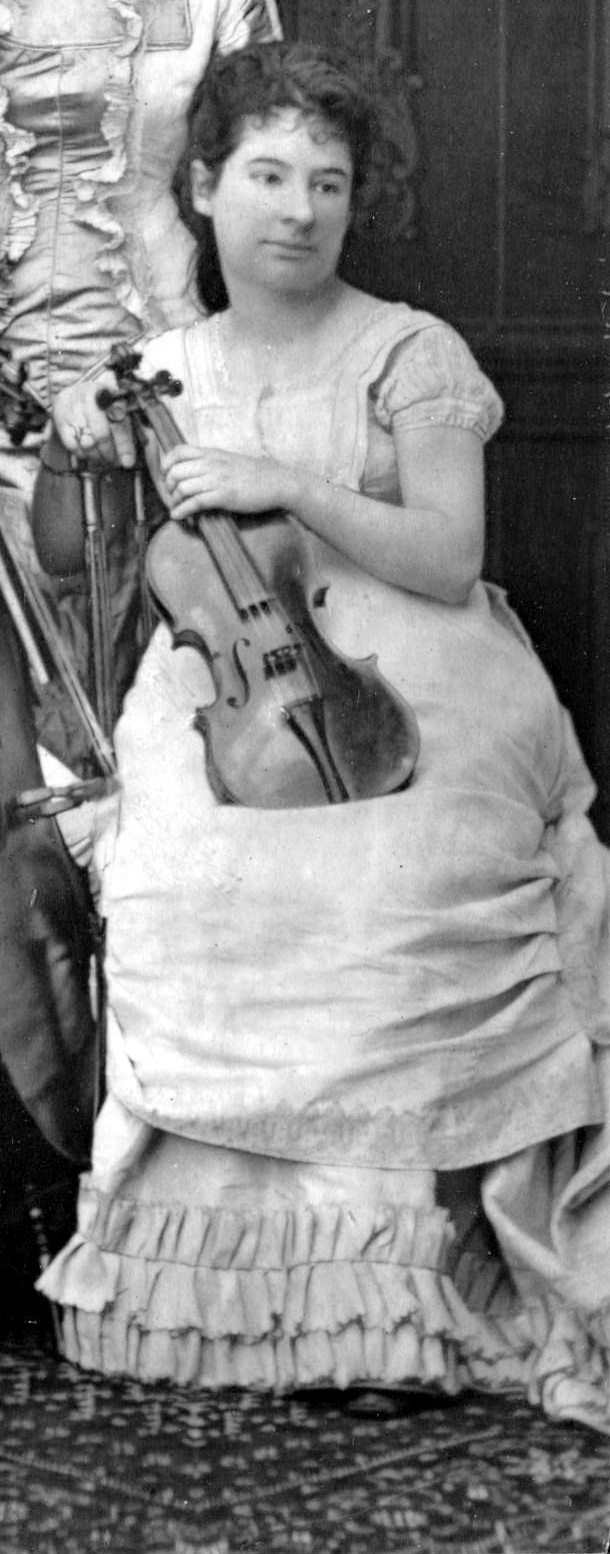
- Marie Tayau c. 1878
- Born: 12 June 1855; Pau, French Empire
- Died: August 1892 (aged 37); Paris, French Republic
- Occupations: Violinist, violin teacher
- Father: Henri Tayau

Marie Augustine Anne Tayau (12 June 1855 – August 1892) was a French violinist and violin teacher.

== Life and career ==
Marie Tayau was born to music teachers Henri Tayau and Adélina-Eulalie-Aude (née Mettez) and grew up in La Rochelle. As a child, she studied with Jean-Delphin Alard at the Conservatoire de Paris. From 1866, she performed in Parisian salons and concert halls, delighting audiences with her virtuoso playing.

Tayau performed regularly at the Société Nationale de Musique. In December 1876, she premiered Benjamin Godard's Concerto Romantique. The Revue et gazette musicale wrote: "Mademoiselle Tayau's performance was perfect; accuracy, style, beauty and power of sound, she combined everything." A few weeks later, she premiered Gabriel Fauré's Violin Sonata No. 1. Fauré wrote: "I will never be able to express adequately how she made my sonata her own, how she put her heart and spirit into playing it. [...] Mademoiselle Tayau's interpretation was perfect."

In 1879, the Allgemeine musikalische Zeitung called her the most brilliant female violinist after Wilma Neruda: "Her playing is as remarkable for its elegance as for its purity, and in addition she possesses a quite exceptional musical temperament. No one executes and comprehends the music of the great masters better than her." After she gave the Paris premiere of Anton Rubinstein's Violin Concerto, the Revue et gazette musicale wrote: "Mademoiselle Tayau gave an admirable interpretation of this work; one could not wish for a more reliable playing, a more sympathetic sound, a more elevated style. It seems to us that Miss Tayau has even won in terms of charm and delicacy." In 1881, she was named officier of the Académie des Beaux-Arts.

In 1876, Tayau founded the all-female "Quatuor Sainte-Cécile" string quartet, and the chamber music association "L'Art moderne". The founding of a women's quartet was noted in the international press, the Revue et Gazette musicale calling it a step to equality for female musicians: "A female string quartet! Twenty years ago this would have been a laughing matter; today it at most arouses curiosity, even interest. The number of young girls studying the violin and the cello is steadily increasing. [...] The newcomers, however, do not linger on trifles, and they pose first of all as serious artists."

In 1886, Tchaikovsky visited Tayau at her house in Paris. She hoped to give the Paris premiere of his Violin Concerto, and Tchaikovsky gave her his word, later even writing in a letter that he was indebted to her: "Was it not you after all who was the first to try to propagate my music in Paris?" Nonetheless, Tchaikovsky privately found that Martin Pierre Marsick was a more suitable soloist than Tayau. Understanding that this would hurt her deeply, he asked his French publisher to make it seem like that it was he who made the decision.

From the mid-1880s, Tayau taught violin at the École Normale de Musique de Paris. Near the end of her life, she ceased performing publicly and devoted herself to teaching.

Tayau died in Paris in late August 1892 at the age of 37. Her obituary in Le Ménestrel read: "A very talented violinist, Mademoiselle Marie Tayau, died this week. Since her extreme youth, she had shown remarkable artistic dispositions. She was in her time a child prodigy. Her time at the Conservatory was very brilliant; she won the first awards with an indisputable superiority. From then on, she was heard in concerts, especially when it came to helping unfortunate artists. As one of the most distinguished teachers, in the last five years she had almost given up playing in public in order to devote herself more completely to her lessons. Mademoiselle Marie Tayau will be greatly missed, for this distinguished artist was a woman with an excellent heart."
