= Alexander Faris =

Northern Irish composer and conductor (1921–2015)

Faris in his later years

Samuel Alexander "Sandy" Faris (11 June 1921 – 28 September 2015) was a Northern Irish composer, conductor and writer, known for his television theme tunes, including the theme music for the 1970s TV series Upstairs, Downstairs. He composed and recorded many operas and musicals, and also composed film scores (including for Georgy Girl) and orchestral works. As a conductor, he was especially known for his revivals of Jacques Offenbach and Gilbert and Sullivan operettas.

== Early life and career ==
Faris was born in Caledon, County Tyrone, Northern Ireland, the third of the four children of George Faris, a Presbyterian minister, and his wife Grace (née Acheson), a schoolteacher. His aunt was the sculptor Anne Acheson. His father died of pernicious anaemia when he was a toddler, and his mother moved the family to Belfast, where she became headmistress of Victoria College girls' school. His mother noticed his musical aptitude, and he was given piano lessons. He was educated at the Royal Belfast Academical Institution and won a Kitchener Scholarship to study music at Christ Church, Oxford. He served in World War II with the Irish Guards. After the war, still stationed in Europe, he was involved with the restoration of damaged German opera houses. He attended the Royal College of Music in 1948 and worked as a chorus master with the Carl Rosa Opera Company.

Faris first conducted in London for a 1949 revival of Song of Norway at the Palace Theatre. In the 1950s, he served as the musical director for Carl Rosa and conducted for the Royal Ballet. He also conducted Summer Song at the Manchester Opera House in 1955 and Irma La Douce in the West End at the Lyric Theatre in 1958. In between, in 1956 he was given a Commonwealth Fund fellowship to study in New York at the Juilliard School. Back in London, he was musical director, in 1959, for the European premiere of Candide by Leonard Bernstein. In 1960, with Sadler's Wells Opera, he and director Wendy Toye helped to revive interest in the operettas of Jacques Offenbach, beginning with their much-revived production of Orpheus in the Underworld, followed in 1961 by La Vie parisienne. Other operas that he conducted at Sadler's Wells included Madam Butterfly in 1966. He conducted Carl Davis's television opera The Arrangement in 1965.

== Gilbert and Sullivan and later years ==
Faris played Katisha in a school production of The Mikado, but he was first associated with the works of Gilbert and Sullivan as a conductor of excerpts from The Mikado, The Gondoliers and The Pirates of Penzance with the Linden Singers and the North German Radio Symphony Orchestra for World Record Club in Hamburg in February–March 1961. Then in January 1962, on the first day after the copyright on W. S. Gilbert's works expired, he conducted Iolanthe with Sadler's Wells at Stratford-upon-Avon and later The Mikado with that company. He was later engaged by the D'Oyly Carte Opera Company to conduct its last season in 1981–82, and he was one of the conductors for the company's last night at the Adelphi Theatre on 27 February 1982. Among other Gilbert and Sullivan engagements, Faris conducted The Mikado for the Turkish National Opera in Ankara. He also conducted The Yeomen of the Guard in the moat at the Tower of London for the 1978 City of London Festival. He was the conductor for twelve of the Savoy operas in the 1982 series of videos by Brent Walker productions. Four years later, with the Scottish Chamber Orchestra in Glasgow, he conducted ten Sullivan overtures (Nimbus CD, NI 5066).

Other West End credits included Robert and Elizabeth (Lyric Theatre, 1964), The Great Waltz and Billy (both at the Theatre Royal, Drury Lane, 1970 and 1974), Bar Mitzvah Boy (Her Majesty's Theatre, 1978) and Oklahoma! (Palace Theatre, 1980). His original London cast recordings include Summer Song (1956), Irma La Douce (1958), Robert and Elizabeth (1964), The Great Waltz (1970), Bordello (1974), Bar Mitzvah Boy (1978), and Charlie and Algernon (1979). Faris also conducted for the London Symphony Orchestra, among other orchestras. He orchestrated music for Luciano Pavarotti, including Leoncavallo's Mattinata for Pavarotti's recording in 1976. He composed the film scores for The Quare Fellow (1962), He Who Rides a Tiger (1965) and Georgy Girl (1966). He also wrote a scholarly Offenbach biography (1980) and a memoir, Da Capo Al Fine: A Life in Music (2009). The former "remains one of the most important" Offenbach biographies.

For television he wrote the theme music for The Duchess of Duke Street (1976), Wings (1977), Fanny by Gaslight (1981), and Upstairs, Downstairs (1971), his most enduring composition. The latter theme, formally known as "The Edwardians/The Golden Waltz”, achieved great popularity: Pauline Collins recorded two vocal versions of it in 1973, it won Faris an Ivor Novello Award in 1976 for the Best Theme from TV or Radio, and it was used again for the later BBC version of the show that began its run at the end of 2010. "The Edwardians" was also used as the title music for the "Upshares, Downshares" finance slot on BBC Radio 4's PM news programme. Cover versions of the theme, in a variety of styles from bossa nova to heavy metal, were submitted by listeners, and "83 different versions were played" on the programme by 2010. Faris was engaged to conduct a compilation of these, released on CD in 2010 in aid of the Children in Need charity appeal, for which it raised over £70,000. He also wrote "What Are We Going to Do With Uncle Arthur?", with lyrics by Alfred Shaughnessy, the Upstairs, Downstairs script editor, and "With Every Passing Day", with lyrics by Benny Green. His other compositions include the song "A Century of Micks" for the choir of the Irish Guards, the orchestral work Sketches of Regency England and the operetta R Loves J (Chichester Festival, 1973, based on Peter Ustinov's Romanoff and Juliet).

Faris died in 2015 at age 94. He was unmarried, and his closest survivors were four nephews and a niece.

== Publications ==
- 1980. Jacques Offenbach (London: Faber & Faber, ISBN 978-0-571-11147-3)
- 2009. Da Capo Al Fine: A Life in Music (Matador, ISBN 978-1-84876-113-1)
