= La chatte métamorphosée en femme =

Opéra comique by Eugene Scribe, Mélesville and Jacques Offenbach

Jacques Offenbach by Nadar, c. 1860s

La chatte métamorphosée en femme (The cat transformed into a woman) is a one-act opéra comique of 1858 with words by Eugene Scribe and Mélesville, and music by Jacques Offenbach.

== Performance history ==
La chatte métamorphosée en femme was first performed in Paris, at the Théâtre des Bouffes-Parisiens, on 19 April 1858, and was kept in the repertory by the Bouffes-Parisiens for some time. It was revived at the 1986 Carpentras Festival, and more recently at the Théâtre de Cornouaille, Quimper and the Opéra de Rennes, in 2008.

== Roles ==
Role	Voice type	Premiere Cast, 19 April 1858. (Conductor: Jacques Offenbach)
Guido, son of a merchant from Trieste	tenor	Tayau
Marianne, a widow, his housekeeper	mezzo-soprano	Marguerite Macé
Minette, Guido's cat	soprano	Lise Tautin
Dig-Dig	baritone	Désiré

== Synopsis ==
The setting is Guido’s house, in Biberach, Swabia

At the back of the stage an alcove with a divan hidden by curtains. At the front a table with a box on it, and a bird cage attached to the wall. Doors to the left and right.

Guido, a handsome bachelor, has been abandoned by all his friends since he lost his money, and Minette, his cat – for which the governor's cook has offered three florins – is all that remains of Guido's household. Marianne is sitting by the table knitting; she takes the white cat from her lap to the divan.

Guido returns and Marianne asks why he has not appealed to his rich uncle for financial assistance. Guido forbids her to speak his name: it was he who ruined Guido's father, furthermore they would have to ask Schalgg, his intendant. Guido rejects this suggestion too; but Marianne suggests that his charming young cousin might help him out. Alone, Guido expresses his love for his ‘pauvre petite Minon’.

Just then, a stranger, dressed as an Indian comes to the door; it is Dig-Dig. He explains that Guido's father did business with Indian merchants, and presents a purse with 100 florins owed to Guido's father. Guido takes the purse and puts it in the box. Dig-Dig claims to be from Kandahar in Kashmir and has visited France and Paris where he taught dancing, astronomy and conjuring, as well as the transmutation of souls. Dig-Dig tells Guido that his cat contains the most beautiful and mischievous young girl, and he will transform the creature – using an amulet (which costs 200 florins). After an invocation to Brahma, the curtain at the rear of the room opens to reveal Minette lying on the divan, as a beautiful girl dressed in white. Guido is stunned as Minette introduces herself to him.

Marianne returns and announces that to buy food for dinner she has agreed the sale of the cat to the wife of the governor; she is astonished to see a woman in Guido's room. He hastily claims that she is the daughter of an old friend of his father who has just arrived from England. Guido adds, that the governor's son can come and collect the cat – if he can recognize her... During the following ensemble, Minette begins to behave more and more like a cat.

Guido is worried by this and begins to regret the change in her, and as he tries to assert himself they quarrel and she pretends to jump from the window – Guido rushes out into the street. Marianne is fed up with the commotion in the house and wants to leave, having since found the real cat shut in a cupboard. Minette now lets her in on the plot, as Guido returns without finding the cat. He asks himself "where is she?" to which Minette replies "here I am" and again moves as if to leave. Guido commands Marianne to prevent Minette from leaving, but she affects to be struck dumb.

Dig-Dig enters, but as he is also struck dumb, Guido goes to his box to find the amulet, but a white cat jumps out and runs off. Marianne and Dig-Dig reveal all: Dig-Dig is Guido's wealthy uncle's intendant, while Minette is the cousin whom Guido would not marry. Realising his true feelings, Guido relents and all sing a final chorus and the curtain falls to the words "Miaou!".

Minette has an air to Brahma, full of trills, a ‘miaou’ cat song, a love duo and an eating trio.

== See also ==
Frederick Ashton created a short ballet solo for Merle Park in Vienna, 1985 using a pot-pourri of themes from the opera; orchestrated by Philip Gammon for its later presentation at Covent Garden. The work has subsequently been performed by the Asami Maki Ballet, Tokyo, the State Ballet of Georgia, Ensemble Productions, UK, Sarasota Ballet, Florida and New York Theatre Ballet.

Other musical works on this theme include ballets La Chatte metamorphosée en femme by Alexandre Montfort with choreography by Jean Coralli (1837), and Henri Sauguet's one-act La Chatte (1927).

The story is related to the original fable The Mouse Turned into a Maid, and to La Fontaine’s fable ‘La Chatte métamorphosée en femme’.
