= Daphne and Chloe =

Painting by Juan Luna

Daphne and Chloe (Spanish: Dafnis y Cloe) is a painting by award-winning Filipino painter and revolutionary activist Juan Luna. Created in the academic style by the artist after being exposed to the works of art of Renaissance master painters in Rome, Daphne and Chloe won Luna a silver palette from the Liceo Artistico de Manila (Artistic Lyceum of Manila).

Despite its popularity among Filipino art historians, the whereabouts of the painting is mysteriously unknown, and no photos of it has ever been posted online. Some suggest that the painting might be under the possession of an aristocratic family in Europe, as the case of Hymen oh Hyménée, which was formally retrieved by a Filipino and imported back to the Philippines from an aristocratic Spanish family in 2014.
