= Un mari à la porte =

Opérette by Jacques Offenbach

Jacques Offenbach by Nadar, c. 1860s

Un mari à la porte (A Husband at the Door) is an opérette in one act of 1859 with music by Jacques Offenbach. The French libretto was by Alfred Delacour (Alfred Charlemagne Lartigue) and Léon Morand.

Un mari à la porte was premiered by the Théâtre des Bouffes Parisiens at the Salle Lacaze in Paris. The premiere occurred shortly after the first operatic work with words by Eugène Labiche, and Yon discerns a similarity in the vaudevillian plot of Un mari à la porte with popular works by Labiche. The work remained in the repertory of the Bouffes Parisiens for some time.

Popular not only in Paris, but also in Vienna and Budapest, it was widely staged until the end of the 19th century. The UK premiere was not until February 1950 at the Fortune Theatre.

The score includes a comic lamentation for Florestan, a set piece quartet - with the baritone off-stage, and the most notable number, a Valse Tyrolienne (recorded in 1994 by Sumi Jo).

It is still occasionally performed in France, and was staged in Liverpool in 2008, conducted by Vasily Petrenko.

== Roles ==
| Role | Voice type | Premiere Cast, 22 June 1859, (Conductor: Jacques Offenbach) |
|---|---|---|
| Florestan Ducroquet | tenor | Paul Geoffroy |
| Suzanne | mezzo-soprano | Coralie Geoffroy |
| Rosita | soprano | Lise Tautin |
| Henri Martel | baritone | Prosper Guyot |

== Synopsis ==
A darkened room, with a door, windows, a chimney – midnight

Florestan, an operetta composer fleeing a jealous husband, creditors and a bailiff, appears from the chimney in Suzanne’s room. The waltz of a wedding party can be heard. He hides in a cupboard just as the young bride Suzanne and her friend Rosita enter. Suzanne has just had an argument with her new husband, and Rosita is trying to get her to return to the dance.

After singing a Tyrolienne, Suzanne finds Florestan and pleads with him to save her honour by leaving by the window into the garden, but as the room is on the third floor this doesn’t work. When Rosita returns – and after Florestan has explained that his latest operetta was refused by the Bouffes Parisiens – they search their brains for a way for him to get out without being noticed. As Florestan tells more of his story he realizes that the young husband Martel is the bailiff looking for him.

When Martel knocks at the locked door, he hears Florestan’s voice and believes that Suzanne is trying to make him jealous. In the confusion they drop the key out of the window. Still outside Martel pretends to shoot himself. He next goes to retrieve another key for the room. While he is away Florestan gets prepared to jump down to the street. Florestan suddenly remembers that an old aunt had promised to pay his debts if he marries, so he asks Rosita to marry him, and after initial astonishment and reluctance, she accepts. As the curtain falls the husband enters the door.

== Musical numbers ==
- Overture
- Introduction valse
- Duo « Ah ! Ah ! Ah ! quelle mine piteuse ! » (Rosita, Suzanne)
- Valse Tyrolienne « J’entends ma belle » (Rosita)
- Trio « Juste ciel ! que vois-je ? » (Suzanne, Rosita, Florestan)
- Quatuor et Couplets « Il se moque de toi » (Rosita, Suzanne, Florestan, Martel)
- Lamentations de Florestan « Pour votre honneur, oui je m’immole » (Florestan)
- Couplet au public « Ce soir ici, à son mari » (Rosita, Suzanne, Florestan, Martel)

== Recordings ==
| Year | Cast | Conductor Orchestra | Label |
|---|---|---|---|
| 2012 | Anaïk Morel, Gabrielle Philiponet, Stéphane Malbec-Garcia, Marc Canturri | Vasily Petrenko Liverpool Philharmonic | Liverpool Philharmonic Cat.211 |
| 2019 | Patrizio La Placa, Francesca Benitez, Matteo Mezzaro, Marina Ogii | Valerio Galli Orchestra del Maggio Musicale Fiorentino | Dynamic Cat.7844 |
