= Violin Sonata No. 1 (Fauré) =

Sonata written by Gabriel Fauré

- Violin sonata by Gabriel Fauré
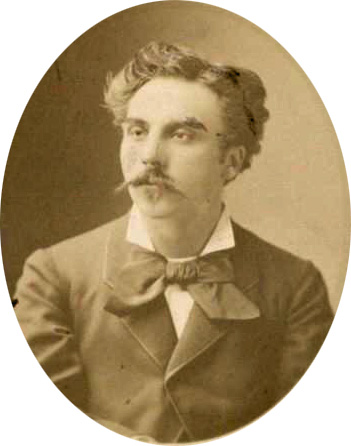
- Fauré in 1875
- Key: A major
- Opus: 13
- Composed: 1875–1876
- Published: 1877 (Breitkopf & Härtel)
- Duration: 25 minutes
- Movements: Four
- Scoring: violin; piano

Premiere
- Date: 27 January 1877
- Location: Salle Pleyel, Paris
- Performers: Gabriel Fauré; Marie Tayau

The Violin Sonata No. 1 in A major, Op. 13, was written by Gabriel Fauré from 1875 to 1876. It is considered one of the three masterpieces of his youth, along with the first piano quartet and the Ballade in F♯ major.

== History ==
The sonata was conceived in the summer of 1875 during a stay in Sainte-Adresse with the family of Camille Clerc, a prominent industrialist and supporter of his work, and completed in the autumn of 1876. Clerc, who had been on excellent terms with the renowned Leipzig-based publisher Breitkopf & Härtel, made considerable efforts to get Fauré's work published. However, Breitkopf & Härtel was only willing to publish the sonata if Fauré renounced his fee: "M. Fauré is not known in Germany and the market is overflowing with works of this sort, even though they're often inferior to the one we're discussing." Fauré accepted these terms, and the work was finally published in February 1877, just weeks after the premiere on 27 January 1877.

The sonata was dedicated to his close friend Paul Viardot, the brother of Marianne Viardot, with whom Fauré was in love. The first recorded performance of the sonata took place on the eve of the premiere at the home of the Clercs, with Paul Viardot on the violin and Fauré himself playing the piano part. The private performance was met with lively enthusiasm.

The premiere itself, at a concert of the Société Nationale de Musique in the Salle Pleyel, with young violinist Marie Tayau, was a great success, with the third movement having to be encored. In a letter dated the same day, Fauré wrote: "The success of my sonata surpassed by far all my expectations!!! [...] As to my performer, I will never be able to express adequately how she made my sonata her own, how she put her heart and spirit into playing it. [...] Mademoiselle Tayau's interpretation was perfect."

The premiere marked a turning point in Fauré's composing career, at the age of 31. The work quickly found its way into the programmes of artists such as Benjamin Godard, Camille Saint-Saëns, Eugène Ysaÿe, Jacques Thibaud, George Enescu, Alfred Cortot and others. Writer Marcel Proust repeatedly paid tribute to the sonata in his novel In Search of Lost Time.

== Structure ==
I. Allegro molto

II. Andante

III. Scherzo. Allegro vivo

IV. Finale. Allegro quasi presto
Performed by Yeh Che-Jui

The work consists of four movements with the first, second, and fourth movement being in sonata form. The music is "confidently and profoundly individual".

1. Allegro molto (A major)
2. Andante (9/8, D minor)
3. Scherzo: Allegro vivo (2/8, A major)
4. Finale: Allegro quasi presto (6/8, A major)

A performance takes approximately 25 minutes.

=== I. Allegro molto ===
The main theme (A) of the passionate first movement enters immediately, the piano presenting its two ideas.

The violin plays a variant of the first motif before turning to the second motif (A', bars 37-38).

After a brief dialogue between the instruments, a more discreet second theme (B, p ed espressivo) is introduced in the violin, modulating to the dominant E major over a rising chromatic bass.

In the rather gentle development section, Fauré's biographer Nectoux finds "wholly remarkable inventiveness and assurance". The first five notes of theme A are developed first, first in F major, then in A major and its relative F♯ minor. Motif A' is developed next, first in F♯ minor (p e leggiero) and G♭ major before making a modulation to D♭ major. The much briefer development of theme B follows, "floating ethereally above deep, hushed piano chords", and leading to the recapitulation. There, motif A' is heard in F♯ minor, and theme B in A major, rising to a fortissimo. The movement finishes in a bold coda.

=== II. Andante ===
The reticent slow movement begins in the rhythm of a barcarolle, the violin imitating the singing of a Venetian gondolier, "sighing languorously above the heartbeat of repeated chords".

The roles are then reversed, and a second theme in F major sparks a lively dialogue between the two instruments, with "widely arpeggiated melodic curves mounting the scale step by step", anticipatory of Franck's Violin Sonata that would be published ten years later.

A variation of the introduction leads to a new barcarolle idea on the piano that is developed to "fine lyrical effect" in the middle of the movement. In the reprise, the roles of the instruments are once again reversed, the second movement leading to a final cadence in D major.

=== III. Scherzo: Allegro vivo ===
The fast-paced scherzo is of light-hearted nature, blending lively cross-rhythm runs with pizzicati.

In a second section in D♭ major, the initial notes of the main theme are augmented, resulting in an "atmosphere of abandon".

The lyric trio in F♯ minor, similar to Schumann's Three Romances for Oboe and Piano, leads into the reprise.

At the premiere, this movement had to be encored. Nectoux regards it as the model for the serenades that Debussy and Ravel put into their string quartets.

=== IV. Finale: Allegro quasi presto ===
The dramatic finale has a tripartite form with a central development section, with the numerous melodic and rhythmic elements combining in a long, lyrical flow. Nectoux writes: "It is hard indeed to know which to admire more: the melodic fertility, the variety of rhythm, or the harmonic progressions which are at once supple, unexpected and totally convincing."

The movement begins dolce on the violin, though it quickly transforms into the most energetic of the four movements, mesmerizingly oscillating around a recurrent C♯.

A second, strikingly syncopated theme breaks out in double stop octaves on the violin.

In development, the first theme is obsessively worked against a new violin melody. The piece culminates in a brief majestic coda of pure virtuosity.

== Reception ==
At the premiere, the sonata was rapturously received. The Revue et gazette musicale de Paris wrote: "This work, remarkable in more than one way, and very well performed by the composer and M. Marie Tayau, was warmly appreciated and applauded. The ideas are pleasant, and the composer develops them with ease. The scherzo, of a slightly shortened form, but new and of a very interesting rhythm, was given the honors of an encore."

Camille Saint-Saëns praised the work highly: "This sonata has everything that will seduce the gourmet: novel forms, exquisite modulations, uncommon tone colours, the use of the most unexpected rhythms. And hovering above all this is a magic which envelops the work and brings the masses of ordinary listeners to accept the wildest audacities as something perfectly natural." He greeted the arrival of a "new champion, perhaps the most sterling of them all".

Today, the violin sonata is perhaps the most popular chamber music work by Fauré, cherished for its "freshness and verve, its characteristic Fauréan balance of elegant restraint and romantic ardour".
