= Le mariage aux lanternes =

Opérette by Jacques Offenbach

Jacques Offenbach by Nadar, c. 1860s

Le mariage aux lanternes (The Wedding by Lantern-Light) is an opérette in one act by Jacques Offenbach. The French libretto was written by Michel Carré and Léon Battu.

It was first performed at the Salle Choiseul, Théâtre des Bouffes-Parisiens, Paris, on 10 October 1857. The operetta was a reworking of Le trésor à Mathurin, with words by Battu (1829–1857), which had a well-received single performance at the Salle Herz, Paris, on 7 May 1853 but was subsequently lost.

After the Paris premiere, Le mariage aux lanternes was produced in Berlin and Vienna in 1858, Prague, Graz and Budapest in 1859, London, New York, Brussels, Stockholm in 1860, Moscow in 1871 and Milan in 1875. Later it was revived at the Opéra-Comique in 1919, Stockholm in 1927 and Berlin in 1930.

The work is in Offenbach's more pastoral and sentimental style rather than the 'bouffonerie' of some of his contemporary stage works.

== Roles ==
Roles, voice types, premiere cast
Role	Voice type	Premiere cast, 10 October 1857 Conductor: Jacques Offenbach
Catherine	soprano	Marie Dalmont
Denise	soprano	Maréchal
Fanchette	soprano	Lise Tautin
Guillot	tenor	Paul Geoffroy
Le garde-champêtre	spoken role	Antognini

== Synopsis ==
Place: A village square, with Guillot's house and a barn with a large tree in front
Time:

A young farmer Guillot has affection for his orphan cousin Denise, who was entrusted to him by their uncle Mathurin. He hides his feelings by treating her roughly, driving the young girl to despair. Both write to their uncle: him for money, her for advice. Two gossiping widows, Catherine and Fanchette, poke fun at the doltishness of Guillot, but when he receives a letter from his uncle telling him about treasure that may be found under the great tree when the evening church bells peal the two women determine to win Guillot's hand.

At the time of the angélus, Denise enters, reading a letter from her uncle which tells her that she will find a good husband underneath the great tree, where she falls asleep. As Guillot arrives with his spade and lantern, he hears her speak his name in her sleep, and understands that she is Mathurin's promised treasure. By the light of the lanterns of villagers, who have also come to inspect the treasure, they agree to wed, much to the chagrin of the two widows.

== Recordings ==
- Recordings may be found on operadis-opera-discography.org.uk
