= Lise Tautin =

French opera singer

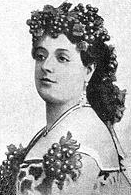
Lise Tautin

Lise Tautin, known on the stage by the pseudonym Mademoiselle (Mlle) Cor, (born Louise Vaissière, Yvetot in 1834, died Bologna, May 1874), was a French soprano, associated with the opéra-bouffe in Paris in the middle of the 19th century, particularly the works of Offenbach.

== Life and career ==
Having been spotted by Offenbach at the Grand Théâtre de Lyon, Tautin made her debut with the Bouffes-Parisiens as Aspasie in Une demoiselle en loterie in July 1857 and was a big success with critics and the audiences. She also sang Fanchette in Le mariage aux lanternes (1857), Crout-ou-pôt in Mesdames de la Halle (1858), Minette in La chatte métamorphosée en femme 1858 - her incarnation of both girl and cat was praised, and Eurydice in Orphée aux Enfers (1858 and 1860 revival), where her ‘Hymne a Bacchus’ was encored, or often sung three times at each performance.

Then followed Rosita in Un mari à la porte (1859), Gratioso and other roles in the first version of Geneviève de Brabant (1859), Les Bouffes-Parisiens in Le carnaval des revues (1860), Catarina in Le pont des soupirs (1861), and Ernestina in M. Choufleuri restera chez lui le . . . (1861). She visited Vienna with the Bouffes-Parisiens in the summer of 1861, during which she created La Sincère in Les bergers.

In the spring of 1862 she starred in La boîte au lait at the Théâtre des Variétés. Tautin took over the title role for some performances of La belle Hélène in 1865. She was taken ill returning from a tour to Constantinople in 1874.
