= Daphnis et Chloé (Offenbach) =

Opérette by Jacques Offenbach

Jacques Offenbach by Nadar, c. 1860s

Daphnis et Chloé is a one-act opérette by Jacques Offenbach. The libretto was by Clairville (alias of Louis-François Nicolaïe, 1811–1879) and Jules Cordier (alias of Éléonore Tenaille de Vaulabelle, 1801–1859), based on the story of Daphnis and Chloe. The origin is the novel by Longus adapted as a play at the Théâtre du Vaudeville in 1849.

== Performance history ==
Libretto of Daphnis et Chloé

It premiered at the Théâtre des Bouffes-Parisiens (Salle Choiseul) on 27 March 1860 under the direction of the composer. In the 1866 revival, Léonce was Pan, with Ugalde as Daphnis; Collas returned as Chloé.

In 1907, the piece was arranged by André Bloch and performed as Myrianne et Daphné at the Monte Carlo Opera, with 'Tate' (Maggie Teyte) as Tyrius, Edmond Clément as Myrianne and Hector Dufranne as Alphésibée.

== Roles ==
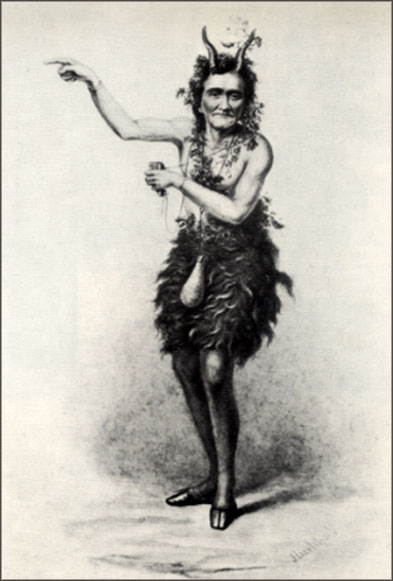
Johann Nestroy as Pan, c. 1870

Roles, voice types, premiere cast
Role	Voice type	Premiere cast, 27 March 1860 (Conductor: Jacques Offenbach)
Pan, the god	bass	Désiré
Chloé, a shepherdess	soprano	Collas
Daphnis, a shepherd	mezzo-soprano	Juliette Beau
Calisto, a bacchante	soprano	Marie Cico
Xantippe, a bacchante		Marguerite Chabert
Locoë, a bacchante		
Aricie, a bacchante		
Eriphyle, a bacchante		
Amalthée, a bacchante		
Niobé, a bacchante		

== Synopsis ==
A pastoral scene in ancient Greece

Bacchantes, observed by the statue of Pan, discuss Daphnis, with whom they are all in love. When they have left Pan reveals that he is in pursuit of the shy but proud Chloé, who next enters with a lamb. As she waits for her rendez-vous with Daphnis she insults the listening Pan. Daphnis confesses to Chloé that when he is alone he only thinks of her – she is the same. They decide that what they need is pipes so that when they meet the other shepherds and shepherdesses they can join in the dances; Pan throws a flute in the lap of Daphnis, but it won't play for him. Pan mocks the innocent lovers. When Chloé rushes off to her flock Pan pursues her while Daphnis tries to dream of her.

The bacchantes return and prevent Daphnis from leaving; they convince him that the way to cure his lovesickness is to take a mistress. They try to tempt him, but he is not swayed, so they give him water from the river Léthée to make him forget her. Pan bursts in, and they escape dragging Daphnis with them. Pan takes the gourd with the water-of-forgetfulness in it just as Chloé returns; he flatters her and tries to teach her what to do with a lover. After a few kisses, Pan takes a swig of the water and forgets what comes after that. Daphnis returns having learnt a few lessons from the bacchantes, but puts off the final lesson until tomorrow. They thank the bacchantes in dance, and ask the audience to be indulgent and gentle, like lambs, on their show.

== Recordings ==
- List of recordings, operadis-opera-discography.org.uk
