= Le docteur Miracle =

- Opérette by Georges Bizet
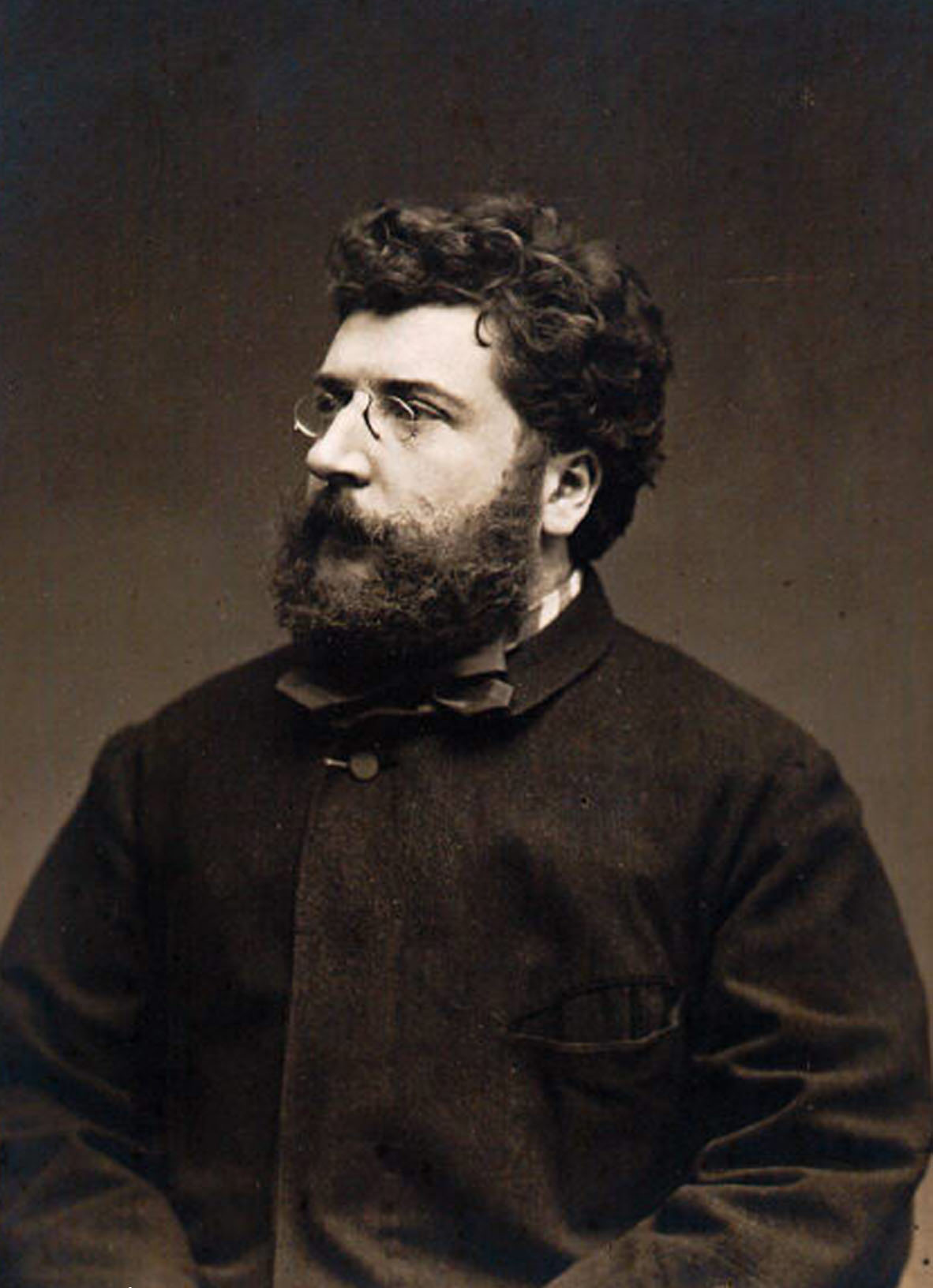
- Bizet in 1875
- Translation: Doctor Miracle
- Librettist: Léon Battu; Ludovic Halévy
- Language: French
- Based on: Saint Patrick's Day by Sheridan
- Premiere: 9 April 1857; Théâtre des Bouffes Parisiens, Paris

Le docteur Miracle (Doctor Miracle) is an opérette in one act by the French composer Georges Bizet. The libretto, by Léon Battu and Ludovic Halévy, is based on Sheridan's play Saint Patrick's Day. Bizet wrote the work when he was just 18 years old for a competition organised by Jacques Offenbach. He shared first prize with Charles Lecocq. His reward was to have the piece performed 11 times at Offenbach's Bouffes-Parisiens theatre. The premiere took place on 9 April 1857 at Théâtre des Bouffes Parisiens in Paris.

== Roles ==
Role	Voice type	Premiere cast Conductor: Jacques Offenbach
Laurette	soprano	Marie Dalmont
Véronique	mezzo-soprano	Marguerite Macé
Capitaine Silvio/Pasquin/Docteur Miracle	tenor	Gerpré
Le Podestat	baritone	Pradeau

== Plot ==
The story takes place in Padua in the middle of the nineteenth century. The mayor and his wife Véronique are woken up very early one morning by what appears to be a noisy advertising campaign outside their house, shouting the talents of a Doctor Miracle. This is, in fact, a young officer, Silvio, who had thought up this ruse in order to be able to serenade the mayor's daughter Laurette, with whom he has fallen in love. The mayor, who has an aversion to the military, has got wind of their relationship and had forbidden Laurette to have anything to do with soldiers. He suspects that Doctor Miracle is Silvio in disguise, but his worries are calmed by Laurette and by Véronique, who has guessed what is going on.

Laurette sings of her passion for Silvio, and a young man suddenly arrives at the house: he says that he is Pasquin and that he has been sent by a friend of the mayor to help out with the housework – he adds that he is allergic to soldiers. The mayor is delighted to welcome him into the house, not realising that Pasquin is in fact Silvio in another disguise. Pasquin sings of his many attributes as a servant and the mayor is pleased with what he hears.

The mayor introduces Pasquin to his wife and daughter and Pasquin, to Laurette's disgust (although she has not recognised him yet), pretends to flirt with Véronique. It is time for breakfast, and the mayor gives Pasquin instructions to prepare an omelette.

In the famous Omelette quartet, Pasquin brings in the omelette and they all sing its praises. But when the mayor and his wife and Laurette taste it, they all start to choke – it is disgusting. The mayor and Véronique rush from the house to rinse their mouths out and Laurette now recognises Pasquin as Silvio: they sing a tender love duet which turns into a trio when the mayor returns and catches them together. Furious, he throws Silvio out of the house.

Soon after, a telegram arrives from Silvio confessing that the omelette was in fact poisoned. The mayor is terrified, but Laurette tells him that she knows a wonderful doctor who will be able to cure him. In a panic, the mayor promises to give this doctor anything he wants in return for the antidote to the poison. The doctor arrives – it is, of course, Silvio again, back in the Doctor Miracle disguise. He offers to cure the mayor in return for Laurette's hand in marriage. The mayor concedes defeat and agrees to the marriage, at which Silvio declares that the omelette wasn't poisoned after all. Thoroughly outwitted, the mayor offers Laurette to Silvio and the opera ends in an ensemble in which they all agree that the phony doctor did after all have the cure for everything, which is Love.
