= Marie Cico =

French singer

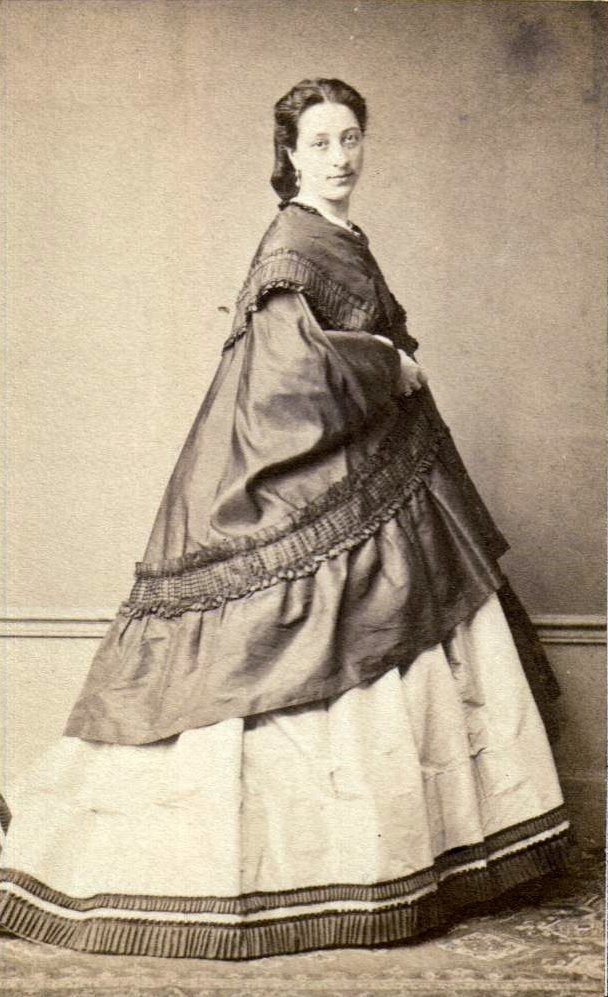
Marie Cico

Marie Cico (4 July 1841 – 9 September 1875), was a French singer of opéra-comique and operetta.

== Biography ==
Marie Cico was born in Paris on 4 July 1841. She made her debut at the Théâtre du Palais-Royal, where she was noticed by Jacques Offenbach, who took her into his company. At the Bouffes-Parisiens she created the roles of Minerve in Orphée aux enfers (1858), Lahire and Clé-de-Sol in Geneviève de Brabant (1859) and Calisto in Daphnis et Chloé (1860).

After winning prizes at the Paris Conservatoire, she made her debut at the Opéra-Comique on 30 September 1861 in Les mousquetaires de la reine. Cico then created the title role in Lalla-Roukh by Félicien David (1862), Le voyage en Chine (1865) by François Bazin, Robinson Crusoé (1867), La pénitent (1868) and Vert-Vert (1869). In 1874 Cico was engaged at the Théâtre de la Gaîté in preparation for a revival of Orphée aux enfers.

At the Opéra-Comique she also sang in Zampa (Camille) in 1863 and Le domino noir in 1864. Cico took part in the new production of Le Pré aux clercs in 1865 (Isabelle), and in the 1,000th performance of the piece on 7 December 1871. She made her debut in Fra Diavolo (Pamela) on 10 March 1870, and on 24 February 1872 took part as Suzanne in the Opéra-Comique premiere of The Marriage of Figaro.

Her sister Pauline was also an actress who performed at the Théâtre du Vaudeville, Palais-Royal, and Ambigu theatres.

Cico died on 9 September 1875 in Neuilly-sur-Seine.
