= Mesdames de la Halle =

Opérette bouffe in one act by Jacques Offenbach

Jacques Offenbach by Nadar, c. 1860s

Mesdames de la Halle is an opérette bouffe in one act by Jacques Offenbach, with a libretto by Armand Lapointe. It was first performed at the Théâtre des Bouffes Parisiens, Paris on 3 March 1858. and was the first work of Offenbach's at the Bouffes with a chorus and a large cast. Gänzl describes the piece as "a delicious piece of Parisian bouffonerie"

== Performance history ==
Bouffes on tour staged Mesdames de la Halle in Vienna with Lucille Tostée as Croûte-au-pot, then in Budapest, where a Hungarian version soon followed.

It was performed in Berlin in 1858, Brussels in 1860, and Monte Carlo in 1908. It was also produced at the Théâtre des Arts on 3 April 1913, conducted by Gabriel Grovlez, with a cast including Lucy Vauthrin, Marcelle Devries and Maurice Lamy. It was mounted at the Paris Opéra-Comique on 4 May 1940 with René Hérent, Lillie Grandval and Roger Bourdin, conducted by Gustave Cloëz. Mesdames de la Halle was performed as part of a triple bill entitled ‘Vive Offenbach’ with Pomme d'api and M. Choufleuri restera chez lui le . . . at the Opéra-Comique in December 1979, revived the following year and in 1983. "Mesdames de la Halle" was performed as part of a double bill with "Bagatelle" by the non-profit opera troupe New Moon Opera Company in December 2017 in Chicago, Illinois.

== Roles ==
Role	Voice type	Premiere Cast, 3 March 1858, (Conductor: Offenbach)
Madame Poiretapée (fish seller)	tenor	Léonce
Madame Madou (vegetable seller)	baritone	Désiré
Madame Beurrefondu (vegetable seller)	baritone	Georges-Louis Mesmaecker
Raflafla (drum major)	tenor	Edmond Duvernoy
Le commissaire	baritone	Prosper Guyot
Marchand d’habits	tenor	Jean Paul
Ciboulette (vegetable seller)	soprano	Marguerite Chabert
Croûte-au-pot (kitchen boy)	soprano	Lise Tautin
Marchande de plaisirs	soprano	Baudoin
Marchande de fruits	soprano	Cico
Marchande de légumes	mezzo-soprano	Kunzé
Marchande de pois verts	soprano	Byard
People of la Halle, customers, policemen, soldiers

== Synopsis ==
The setting is the Marché des Innocents in the reign of Louis XV.

At the Paris fruit and vegetable market vendors of all kinds are plying for custom. The drum major, Raflafla, enters with some troops and sings a flattering song to the market women. Madou and Beurrefondu are not interested; they are after the young kitchen boy Croûte-au-pot, for whom Mesdames Poiretapée, Madou and Beurrefondue have all fallen. Croûte-au-pot enters, but singing of his love for the fruit seller Ciboulette. Madou and Beurrefondu press their wares on him, but when he upturns his basket, Raflafla re-enters and takes Croûte-au-pot off in a barrow. Madou and Beurrefondu fight with Poiretapée, which attracts the attention of the commissaire, the customers and Ciboulette; when the quarreling women have been led away, Ciboulette introduces herself, in song. When Raflafla tries to sweet-talk her she repulses him, despite the fact that her heart always misses a beat when she meets him. Poiretapée has bribed the commissaire with a drink and comes back to the market where Raflafla tries it on with her, by singing a ballad to the moon. Croûte-au-pot comes in, having jumped out of a window at the jail, and he and Ciboulette sing a happy duet.

Beurrefondu re-enters, disapproving of Ciboulette's liaison with the kitchen-boy. Ciboulette says that as an orphan the consent of her parents will be difficult to obtain. She tells Beurrefondu that her father was a sergeant of guards, and she is eighteen, female and from Vaugirard. Beurrefondu faints into the fountain, and when dragged out claims Ciboulette as her daughter. When Beurrefondu recounts this to Madou she too faints in the fountain leading to a septet over the dilemma. Ciboulette next produces a sealed letter she has kept next to her heart since she was three months old; when Croûte-au-pot reads it out Raflafla and Poiretapée both faint, thus solving the mystery of her parents, who consent to her marriage. The curtain falls with all acclaiming the 'unequalled beauties – the ladies of la Halle'.
