= Jean Baptiste Prosper Bressant =

French actor (1815–1886)

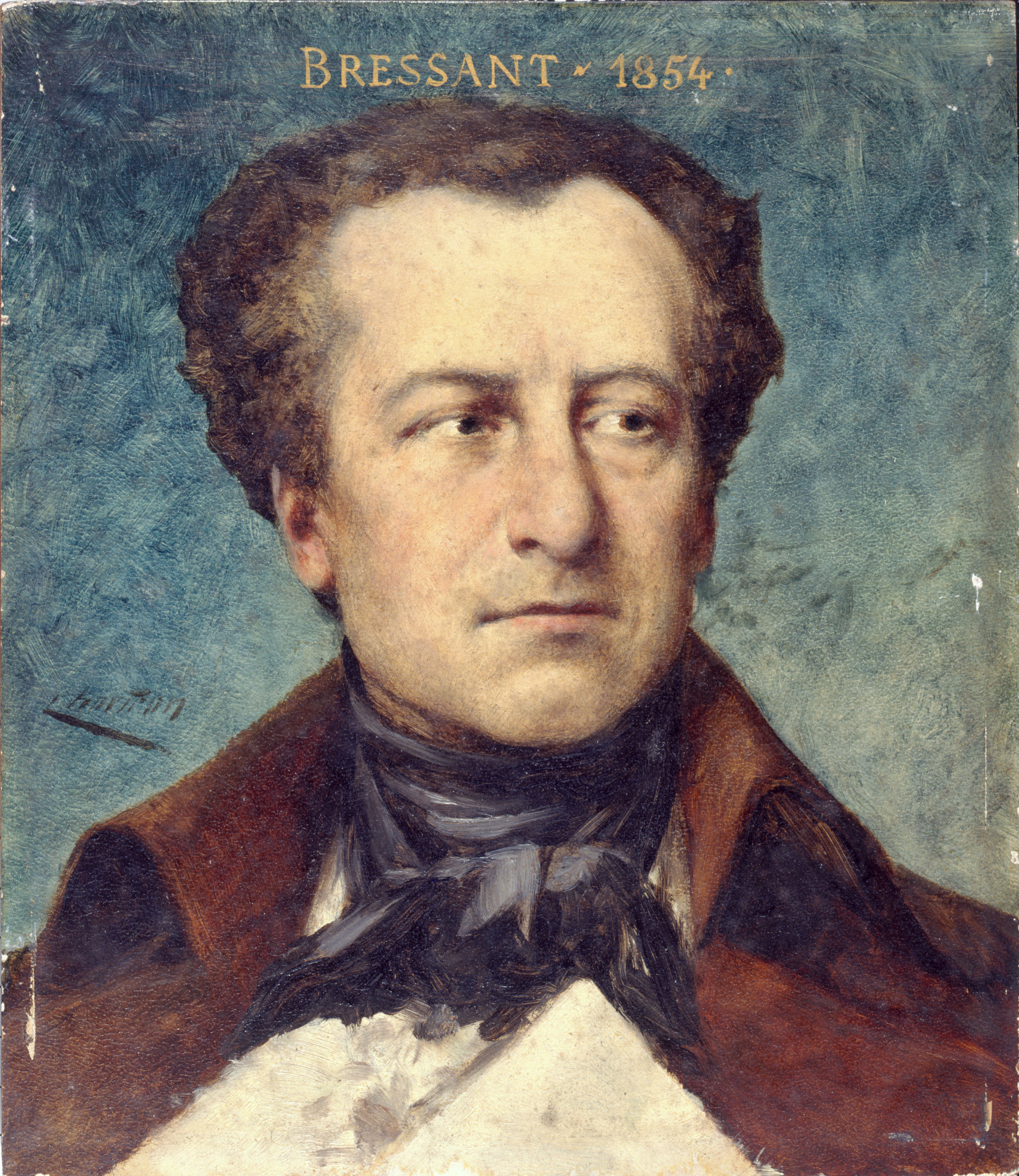
- Born: 24 October 1815; Chalon-sur-Saône, Saône-et-Loire
- Died: 23 January 1886 (aged 70); Saint-Pierre-lès-Nemours

Jean Baptiste Prosper Bressant (24 October 1815 – 23 January 1886) was a French actor born in Chalon-sur-Saône, Saône-et-Loire, in 1815. In 1838, he went to the French theatre at St. Petersburg, where for eight years he played important parts with ever-increasing reputation. His success was confirmed at the Gymnase when he returned to Paris in 1846, and he made his debut at the Comédie Française as a full-fledged sociétaire in 1854.

From playing the ardent young lover, he turned to leading roles both in modern plays and in the classical repertoire. His Richelieu in Mlle de Belle-Isle, his Octave in Alfred de Musset's Les Caprices de Marianne, and his appearance in de Musset's Il faut qu'une porte soit ouverte ou fermée and Un caprice were followed by Tartuffe, Le Misanthrope and Don Juan. Bressant retired in 1875, and died on 23 January 1886. During his professorship at the Conservatoire, Jean Mounet-Sully was one of his pupils.

He introduced a new hairstyle; a magazine of the period described it as follows: "The Bressant hairstyle is this: the hair is left long on both sides and raised, a little bouffant, above the ears; on the top of the head it is cut short, no part, neither to right, nor to the left."
