= Léonce (actor) =

French actor and singer (1823–1900)

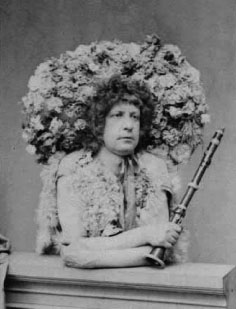
Léonce at the Théâtre des Bouffes-Parisiens, as Aristée, in Orphée aux enfers

Édouard-Théodore Nicole (c. 1823 – 19 February 1900), known as Léonce, was a 19th-century French actor and singer.

== Biography ==
Léonce was born in Paris. After studying law, he made his stage debut at the Théâtre de Belleville. He also played the cello.

In the 1850s, he was engaged at the Théâtre des Bouffes-Parisiens by Jacques Offenbach and sang many roles in the works of Offenbach and Hervé. After some time at the Théâtre de l'Athénée, he played in the premieres of Tromb-al-ca-zar, Croquefer, Orphée aux enfers, Mesdames de la Halle and Monsieur Choufleuri. For several years, he appeared at the Théâtre des Variétés including in Les brigands, Le docteur Ox, La Vie parisienne and La Périchole.

After an unwise investment in a café, he ended his life in poverty. He died at Raincy on 19 February 1900.

== Theatre ==
Comedian-singer

- 1858: Mesdames de la Halle, une opérette bouffe de Jacques Offenbach – created on 3 March 1858 at the Théâtre des Bouffes-Parisiens (salle Choiseul) – as Madame Poiretapée, poissonnière
- 1858: Orphée aux enfers, opéra bouffe by Jacques Offenbach – created on 21 October at the Théâtre des Bouffes-Parisiens – as Aristée-Pluton
- 1859: L'Omelette à la Follembuche, operetta bouffe by Eugène Labiche and Marc-Michel – created on 8 June at the Théâtre des Bouffes-Parisiens – as La baronne de Follembuche
- 1861: M. Choufleuri restera chez lui le . . ., opéra bouffe by Jacques Offenbach – created on 14 September 1861 at the Théâtre des Bouffes Parisiens – as Mme Balandard
- 1865: Les bergers, opéra-comique by Jacques Offenbach – as the Marquis
- 1869: Les brigands, opéra bouffe by Jacques Offenbach – created at the Théâtre des Variétés on 10 December – as Antonio, caissier du duc de Mantoue
- 1873: Les Braconniers, opéra bouffe by Jacques Offenbach – created at the Théâtre des Variétés on 29 January – as Bibès, veux braconnier
- 1875: Les Trente Millions de Gladiator, comédie en vaudevilles by Eugène Labiche and Philippe Gille – created at Théâtre des Variétés on 22 January – as Pepitt
- 1875: La boulangère a des écus, opéra bouffe by Jacques Offenbach – created on 19| October 1875 at the Théâtre des Variétés – as Délicat
- 1876: Le roi dort by Eugène Labiche and Alfred Delacour – created on 31 March at the Théâtre des Variétés – as Bec de miel
- 1877: Le docteur Ox, opéra-bouffe by Jacques Offenbach – created on 26 January at the Théâtre des Variétés – as Ygène
- 1883: Mam'zelle Nitouche, operetta by Hervé (libretto by Henri Meilhac and Albert Millaud) – created on 26 January at the Théâtre des Variétés – as Loriot, "brigadier"

Author

- 1859: Dans la rue, operetta by Léonce (lyricist) – Théâtre des Bouffes-Parisiens – created on 8 September

== Sources ==
- Gänzl Kurt. The Encyclopedia of the Musical Theatre. Blackwell, Oxford, 1994.
