= Hyacinthe (actor) =

French opera singer (1814–1887)

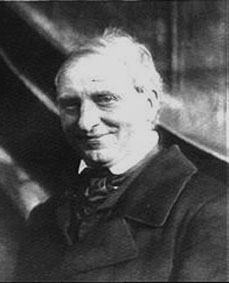
- Born: Louis-Hyacinthe Duflost; 15 April 1814; Amiens, France
- Died: 8 May 1887 (aged 73); Asnières-sur-Seine, France
- Occupations: Actor; operetta singer

Louis-Hyacinthe Duflost (15 April 1814 – 8 May 1887), known as Hyacinthe, was a French actor and operetta singer.

== Life ==
Born in Amiens, he became a comic actor very early in life – his father was wigmaker to the magician Louis Compte, whose troupe he joined aged seven. He was part of several companies, including the Ambigu, the Vaudeville and the Variétés. In 1847 he moved to the company of the Palais-Royal, where he remained until his death and appeared very regularly in plays by Eugène Labiche.

His reputation was partly founded on his large nose, remembered by Parisians long after his death. He lived in Montmartre with his wife and children, most notably during the siege of Paris, when he joined the 32nd Battalion of the Garde Nationale aged 60. He later retired to 3 rue d'Orléans in Asnières, where he died in 1887.

== His main rôles ==
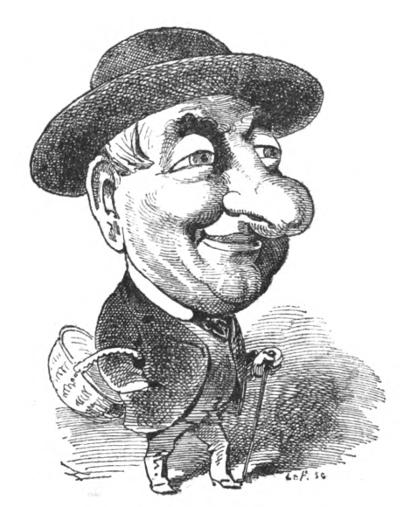
Hyacinthe and his famous nose. Drawing by Georges Lafosse in Le Trombinoscope in 1874.

=== Variétés ===
- Gringalet in Les Saltimbanques by Dumersan and Varin (25 janvier 1838)
- The seducer in Les Trois Épiciers
- Faucheux in Le Maître d'école by Lockroy and Anicet-Bourgeois (20 mars 1841)
- Thibaudeau in Ma maîtresse et ma femme by Dumanoir and Adolphe d'Ennery (25 novembre 1842)

=== Palais-Royal - Labiche ===
- Gindinet in Le Club champenois (1848)
- Arcas in Une tragédie chez M. Grassot (1848)
- Panari in Les Manchettes d’un vilain (1849)
- Balourdeau in Exposition des produits de la République (1849)
- Mazulim in Le Sopha (1850)
- Pépinois in Maman Sabouleux (1852)
- Piccolet in Piccolet (1852)
- Roussin in Un ut de poitrine (1853)
- Antoine in La Chasse aux corbeaux (1853)
- Beauvoisin in Un feu de cheminée (1853)
- Gigomir in Espagnolas et Boyardinos (1854)
- Colardeau in Ôtez votre fille, s'il vous plaît (1854)
- Népomucène in La Fiancée du bon coin (1856)
- Léopardin in Si jamais je te pince!... (1856)
- Mistingue in L'Affaire de la rue de Lourcine (1857)
- Bengalo in La Dame aux jambes d'azur (1857)
- Anatole in Les Noces de Bouchencœur (1857)
- Évariste in Le Grain de café (1858)
- Tchikuli in En avant les Chinois ! (1858)
- Colache in L'Amour, un fort volume, prix 3 F 50 c (1859)
- Jesabel in Voyage autour de ma marmite (1859)
- Bougnol in La Sensitive (1860)
- Malfilatre in La Famille de l'horloger (1860)
- Pénuri in Les 37 sous de M. Montaudoin (1862)
- Bocardon in Célimare le bien-aimé (1863)
- Tapiou in Les Chemins de fer (1867)
- Sancier in Le Papa du prix d'honneur (1868)
- Gargaret in Doit-on le dire ? (1872)
- Ernest Fador in La Pièce de Chambertin (1874)
- Hochard in Les Samedis de Madame (1874)
- prince Poupoulos in La Clé (1874 et 1877)

=== Palais-Royale - other authors ===
- Arthur de Clichy in Le Fils de la belle au bois dormant (1858) by Lambert-Thiboust, Paul Siraudin and Adolphe Choler
- Nérée Dusorbet in La Pénélope à la mode de Caen (1860) by Lambert-Thiboust, Paul Siraudin and Eugène Grangé
- Picardeau in Les Femmes sérieuses (1864) by Paul Siraudin, Alfred Delacour and Ernest Blum
- The baron de Gondremarck in La Vie parisienne (1866) by Henri Meilhac and Ludovic Halévy, music by Jacques Offenbach
- Maître Massepain in Le château à Toto (1868) by Meilhac and Halévy, music by Jacques Offenbach
- Chiffardin in Le Carnaval d’un merle blanc (1868) by Henri Chivot and Alfred Duru
- the marquis de Castel-Bombé in La Vie de château (1869) by Henri Chivot and Alfred Duru
- Alfred in Le Réveillon (1872) by Meilhac and Halévy
- le duc de la Butte-Jonvel in La Tribune mécanique (1872) by Georges Vibert and Étienne-Prosper Berne-Bellecour
- Les Échos de Paris ou la Revue en retard (1873) by Henri Chivot and Alfred Duru
- Alcide Malicorne in Ici, Médor (1875) by Verconsin
- Birochet in Le Panache (1875) by Edmond Gondinet
- Pulverin in L’Homme du Lapin blanc (1875) by Alfred Duru
- Vernouillet in La Chaste Suzanne (1877) by Paul Ferrier
- Édouard in Les Demoiselles de Montfermeil (1878) by Victor Bernard and Théodore Barrière
- Belgodère in Tant plus ça change (1878) by Edmond Gondinet and Pierre Véron
- Beaudichon in Le Volcan (1882) by Edmond Gondinet, François Oswald and Pierre Giffard
- Brochondans in Le Train de plaisir (1884) by Alfred Hennequin, Albert de Saint-Albin et Arnold Mortier
- Lord in La Fille à Georgette (1886) by Albin Valabrègue.
