= Doctor Ox's Experiment =

Doctor Ox's Experiment can refer to:

- Dr. Ox's Experiment, a novella by Jules Verne
- Le docteur Ox, an opera by Jacques Offenbach based on the Verne novella.
- Doctor Ox's Experiment (opera), an opera by Gavin Bryars based on the Verne novella
