= Philippe Gille =

French writer (1831–1901)

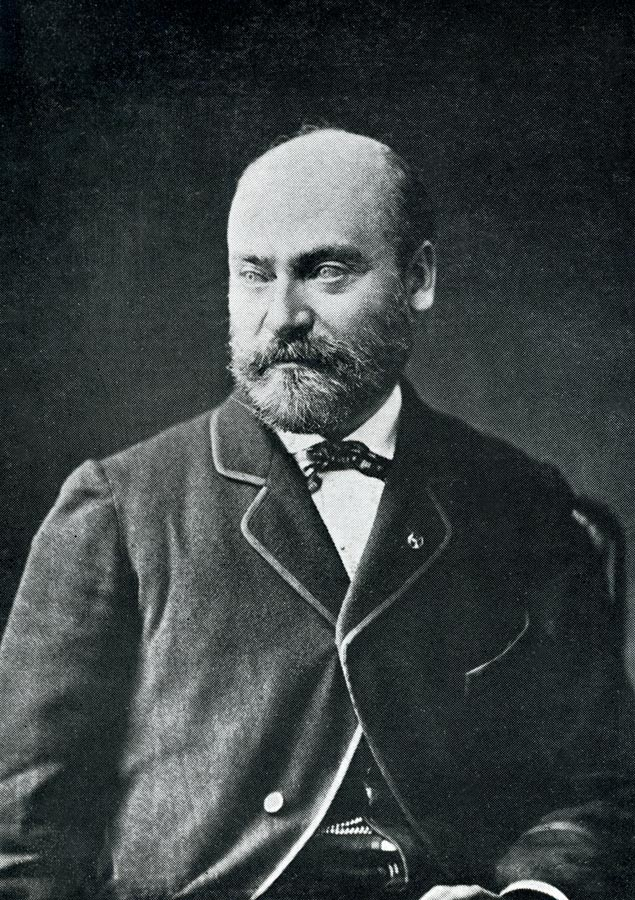
Philippe Gille (date unknown)

Philippe Emile François Gille (10 December 1831 – 19 March 1901) was a French dramatist and opera librettist, who was born and died in Paris. He co-wrote wrote more than twenty librettos between 1857 and 1893, the most famous of which are Massenet's Manon and Delibes' Lakmé.

Gille studied law and was a clerk for a time at the Préfecture de la Seine, before becoming secretary of the Théâtre Lyrique and, from 1869, an art and music critic for Le Figaro.

Gille was elected to the Académie des Beaux-Arts in 1899 and was appointed as an officer of the Legion of Honour.

== Life and career ==
Gille was born in Paris on 18 December 1830, the son of Louis François Gille and his wife, Marie Adelaide Benjamine, née Bidaut. He was educated at the Lycée Charlemagne, after which he studied law for a time and then took up sculpture, before working as a clerk in the office of the Préfecture de la Seine. After next working as secretary of the Théâtre Lyrique he embarked on a parallel career as a playwright and librettist on the one hand and as a journalist on the other.

In 1857 Gille provided the composer Jacques Offenbach with a libretto for a one-act comic opera, Vent du soir, ou L'horrible festin ("Evening Wind, or The Horrible Feast") produced at the Théâtre des Bouffes-Parisiens. Over the next twelve years he worked as sole or co-author on fourteen comedies, some of them spoken and some operatic. His literary collaborators included Ludovic Halévy, Eugène Grangé and Hector Crémieux, and he worked with Léo Delibes on four comic operas.

As a journalist, Gille wrote for papers including Le Petit Journal and Le Soleil before joining the staff of Le Figaro in 1869. There, he wrote about the arts. A section of the front page was reserved for his "Echoes" column, in which, a colleague said, "the spirit of Paris smiled every morning". The same colleague recalled:

[Gille] occupied, with unequalled brilliance, the most eminent position, next to our editors, who were his former comrades. He wrote on the fine arts with the most informed taste; he wrote with unquestionable authority "Literary Criticism" and "Bibliography" and he brought together, under the signature of the "Iron Mask", the most amusing anecdotes and the most exquisite words, issued, with their smiling and courteous philosophy, from his ever more witty and fertile imagination.

In August 1871 Gille married Zoé Jeanne Marie Massé, daughter of the composer Victor Massé. They had one son.

During the 1870s Gille collaborated with, among other dramatists and librettists, Eugène Labiche, Victorien Sardou, Arnold Mortier, Edmond Gondinet and Henri Meilhac. Composers with whom he worked included Offenbach, Charles Lecocq and Olivier Métra. In his last years in the theatre Gille was co-author of two serious operas that entered the international repertoire: for Delibes, Lakmé (1883) with Gondinet and for Jules Massenet, Manon (1884) with Meilhac.

Gille was elected a member of the Académie des Beaux-Arts and was appointed to the Legion of Honour. He died in Paris on 19 March 1901, aged 69, and was buried in the Cimetière du Nord, Montmartre.

== Stage works ==
| Title | Genre | Acts | Co-authors | Composer | Theatre | Date |
|---|---|---|---|---|---|---|
| Vent du soir, ou L'horrible festin ("Evening Wind, or The Horrible Feast") | opérette bouffe | 1 | | Jacques Offenbach | Théâtre des Bouffes-Parisiens | 16 May 1857 |
| M de Bonne Etoile | opéra-comique | 1 | | Léo Delibes | Bouffes | 4 Feb 1860 |
| Le carnaval des revues | revue | 3 | Ludovic Halévy and Eugène Grangé | Offenbach | Bouffes | 10 Feb 1860 |
| Valets de Gascogne | opéra comique | 1 | | Alfred Dufresne | Théâtre Lyrique | 2 Jun 1860 |
| Maître Palma | opéra comique | 1 | Eugène Furpille | Mlle Rivay | Lyrique | 17 Jun 1860 |
| L'hôtel de la poste ("The Post Office") | opéra comique | 1 | | Dufresne | Bouffes | 15 Nov 1860 |
| Le serpent à plumes | opérette bouffe | 1 | Cham | Delibes | Bouffes | 16 Dec 1864 |
| Le boeuf Apis ("The Apis Bull") | opéra bouffe | | Furpille | Delibes | Bouffes | 15 Apr 1865 |
| Sacripant | opéra comique | 2 | | Jules Duprato | Théâtre des Fantaisies-Parisiennes | 26 Sep 1866 |
| Les bergers | opéra comique | | Hector Crémieux | Offenbach | Bouffes | 11 Dec 1865 |
| Tabarin le duelliste | opérette | 1 | Furpille | Léon Pillaut | Bouffes | 13 Apr 1866 |
| Cent mille francs et ma fille ("One Hundred Thousand Francs and My Daughter") | vaudeville | 4 | Adolphe Jaime | | Théâtre Déjazet | 11 Apr 1868 |
| Les horreurs de la guerre | opéra-bouffe | 2 | | Jules Costé | Théâtre de l'Athénée | 9 Dec 1868 |
| L' Écossais de Chatou ("The Scotsman of Chatou") | opéra-bouffe | 1 | Jaime | | Bouffes | 16 Jan 1869 |
| La cour du roi Pétaud ("King Petaud's Court") | opéra comique | 3 | Jaime | Delibes | Théâtre des Variétés | 24 Apr 1869 |
| J'insulte ma femme | vaudeville | | | | Théâtre des Folies-Dramatiques | 25 Dec 1871 |
| Le tour du chien vert | opéra-bouffe | 3 | | Duprato | Folies-Dramatiques | 25 Dec 1871 |
| Garanti dix ans ("Guaranteed for Ten Years") | vaudeville | 1 | Eugène Labiche | | Variétés | 12 Feb 1874 |
| Les près-Saint-Gervais | opéra bouffe | 3 | Victorien Sardou | Charles Lecocq | Variétés | 14 Nov 1874 |
| Les 30 millions de gladiator | vaudeville | 4 | Labiche | | Variétés | 22 Jan 1875 |
| Pierrette et Jacquot | opérette | 1 | Jules Noriac | Offenbach | Bouffes | 13 Oct 1876 |
| Le docteur Ox | opéra bouffe | 3 | Arnold Mortier after Jules Verne | Offenbach | Variétés | 26 Jan 1877 |
| Les charbonniers ("The Charcoal Burners") | opéra bouffe | 1 | | Napoléon Coste | Variétés | 4 Apr 1877 |
| Yedda | ballet | 3 | Mortier | Olivier Métra | Opéra | 17 Jan 1879 |
| Jean de Nivelle | opera | 3 | Edmond Gondinet | Delibes | Opéra-Comique | 188 Mar 1880 |
| Le mari à Babette | comedy | 3 | Henri Meilhac | | Théâtre du Palais-Royal | 31 Dec 1881 |
| La Farandole | ballet | 3 | Mortier | Théodore Dubois | Opéra | 6 Mar 1882 |
| Lakmé | opera | 3 | Gondinet | Delibes | Opéra-Comique | 14 Apr 1883 |
| Ma camarade | comedy | 5 | Meilhac | | Palais-Royal | 9 Oct 1883 |
| Manon | opéra comique | 5 | Meilhac | Jules Massenet | Opéra-Comique | 19 Jan 1884 |
| Rip | opéra comique | 5 | Meilhac after H. B. Farnie | Robert Planquette | Folies-Dramatiques | 11 Nov 1884 |
| La bonne ("The Right One") | vaudeville | 1 | Meilhac | | Folies-Dramatiques | 21 Nov 1884 |
| La ronde du commissaire | comedy | 4 | Meilhac | | Théâtre du Gymnase | 27 Nov 1884 |
| Camille | comedy | 1 | | | Comédie-Française | 12 Mar 1890 |
| Kassya | drame lyrique | 4 | Meilhac | Delibes | Opéra-Comique | 4 Mar 1893 |

Source: Nos auteurs et compositeurs dramatiques and Grove's Dictionary of Music and Musicians.

=== Sources ===
- Martin, Jules (1897). Nos auteurs et compositeurs dramatiques (in French). Paris: Flammarion. OCLC 9145330.
