= Dr. Ox's Experiment =

1872 novella by Jules Verne

Dr. Ox’s Experiment
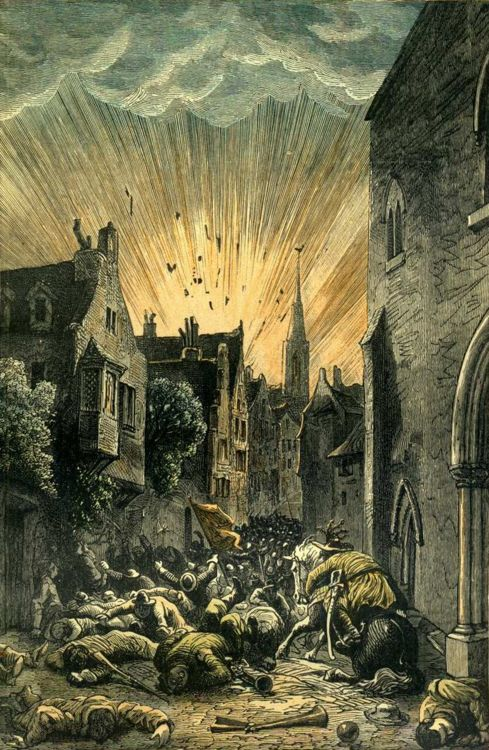
- Illustration by Lorenz Frølich from Doctor Ox (1874)
- Author: Jules Gabriel Verne
- Original title: Une fantaisie du docteur Ox
- Language: French
- Genre: Science fiction
- Publisher: Musée des Familles
- Publication date: March 1872
- Publication place: France

Dr. Ox's Experiment (French: Une fantaisie du docteur Ox, "A Fantasy of Doctor Ox") is a humorous science fiction novella by the French writer Jules Verne, published in 1872. It describes an experiment by one Dr. Ox, and is inspired by the real or alleged effects of oxygen on living things.

== Synopsis ==
The setting of the story is the imaginary village of Quiquendone in West Flanders (now part of Belgium) whose citizens are described as "well-to-do folks, wise, prudent, sociable, with even tempers, hospitable, perhaps a bit heavy in conversation as in mind"; and where even "the dogs don't bite, and the cats don't scratch". Van Tricasse, the town's mayor, claims that "the man who dies without ever having decided upon anything in his life has very nearly attained to perfection."

A prosperous scientist Dr. Ox comes to the authorities and offers to build a novel gas lighting system, at no cost to the town. The offer is gladly accepted. Dr. Ox and his assistant Gédéon Ygène (whose surnames happen to form the word oxygène, "oxygen") propose to use electrolysis to separate water into hydrogen and oxygen, and pump the two gases through separate pipes to the city.

However, the doctor's secret plan is to conduct a large-scale experiment on the effect of oxygen on plants, animals, and humans, so he pumps an excess of the invisible, odourless gas through all the lamps. The air remarkably affects the town: it accelerates plant growth and causes excitement and aggressiveness in animals and humans.

Eventually the excited citizens of Quiquendone decide to go to war against the neighboring village of Virgamen, to avenge an old offense: in 1195, a cow belonging to that town had dared to step into a Quiquendonian field and eat some mouthfuls of their grass. However, as the army was on the way to battle, an accident at Dr. Ox's plant causes oxygen and hydrogen to mix, producing a huge explosion that destroys the plant.

The story ends with the town back to its traditional slow and quiet way of life. Dr. Ox and his assistant, who were not at the plant when the accident happened, disappeared without trace.

== Publication history ==
The story Une fantaisie du docteur Ox ("A fantasy of Dr. Ox") was first read in 1872 at the Hotel of the City of Amiens. It was published in installments between March and May of the same year in the magazine Musée des Familles, and from 6 January to 6 February in Journal d'Amiens.

The story was re-published in 1874 by Hetzel as the main piece of a Verne short-story anthology, Doctor Ox, that included three older tales. The spicy, ironic, satyric, and erotic elements of the original text were significantly expunged for this version.

== Notes ==
The town of Quiquendone may have been intended as a caricature of Amiens, where Verne was living at the time. The name of the town sounds in French as qui qu'en donne?, which could be translated as "who gives?".

The effects of oxygen on living things, as described in the story, are grossly exaggerated or even imaginary.

== Derived works ==
=== On the stage ===
Dr. Ox reappears as the main villain of the play Journey Through the Impossible, written by Verne in 1882.

The original story was adapted by Jacques Offenbach as Le docteur Ox, an opéra-bouffe in three acts and six tableaux, premiered on 26 January 1877 with a libretto by Arnold Mortier, Philippe Gille and Verne himself.

Another version by Annibale Bizzelli, Il Dottor Oss, was published in 1936.

In 1964 Pierre Max Dubois adapted the story as a ballet son a libretto by José Bruyr.

It was also adapted by Gavin Bryars as Doctor Ox's Experiment, an opera in two acts with a libretto by Blake Morrison, first performed on 15 June 1998.

=== Other ===
The H. G. Wells's novel The Food of the Gods (1904) has similarities to Dr. Ox's Experiment, "both dealing with the alterations in humankind and its environment due to changes in the chemicals the species is supplied".

The story was adapted to comics strip form by Mathieu Sapin, and it inspired a 1950 comics album by André Franquin It also was adapted in 1964 by Mino Milani with illustrations by Grazia Nidasio for the Italian children's magazine Corriere dei Piccoli and extended with several original stories featuring the same character, published therein from 1964 to 1969.

An audio version was broadcast by the radio station France Culture in 2017.
