= Pierrette et Jacquot =

Opérette by Jacques Offenbach

Jacques Offenbach by Nadar, c. 1860s

Pierrette et Jacquot is a one-act opérette of 1876 by Jacques Offenbach with a French libretto by Jules Noriac and Philippe Gille.

== Performance history ==
The première of Pierrette et Jacquot was on 13 October 1876 at the Bouffes-Parisiens, Salle Choiseul, Paris, on the same bill as a revival of Duprato’s M’sieu Landry. It was intended originally as a vehicle for the Grégoire sisters, whom Offenbach had discovered in Vienna. Although it was given 53 times that season, it was not considered a major work of the composer and did not enter the repertoire. However, the letter song and the Ronde savoyarde became popular.

== Roles ==
Role	Voice type	Premiere cast, 13 October 1876 (Conductor: Jacques Offenbach)
Cyrille Durand	baritone	Daubray
Pierrette	soprano	Cécile Grégoire
Jacquot	soprano	Esther Grégoire
Madame Patacha	mezzo-soprano	Adèle Cuine
Servant		Sanson

== Synopsis ==
The house of Cyrille Durand

Durand, a rich bachelor and button merchant, dreams of being a hero, and saving someone's life. He has moved near the river and even hangs around the most dangerous road junctions for a chance.

While awaiting an opportunity for such a feat, five years before he had taken in an abandoned Savoyard boy, Jacquot. Then two years ago at the Gare de Lyon Durand found a girl in rags, Pierrette, whom he has helped and found a job. She comes to his house every Sunday. In fact this was no hazard, Jacquot had written to his sweetheart Pierrette to tell her to come to Paris and be found by Durand. Jacquot wants now to confess to Durand and gain consent for them to wed.

It is the day of Saint Cyrille and as a surprise the two young people dress up as natives of Savoy (where Durand comes from) to dance and play the vielle. They hope by this to get Durand's consent for them to marry, but he himself has designs on Pierrette. Durand confides in Madame Patacha that indeed he is thinking of marrying; she thinks he means her. Just as Durand announces his intentions and the others react with surprise and horror, news comes of someone drowning in the Seine; the solid bourgeois dashes out. When Durand is gone Pierrette and Jacquot decide instead to leave him a letter to reveal all. Then Madame Patacha helps Durand back, soaking wet – it was only a dog in the river which ended by saving Durand. On the way back Madame Patacha has talked things over. So Durand relents and allows the two sweet hearts to marry, being content to tie the knot with his neighbour Madame Patacha, and the curtain falls with a reprise of the Ronde savoyard.

== Musical numbers ==
- Introduction
- Couplets « Nous avons la femme à vingt ans » (Patacha, Durand)
- Couplets et duo « Peux-tu parler d’attendre » (Jacquot, Pierrette)
- Mélodrame
- Quatuor et Ronde savoyarde « Allons les gars et les filles » (Pierrette, Jacquot, Patacha, Durand)
- Mélodrame
- Duetto de la Lettre « Mon cher parrain notr’bienfaiteur » (Pierrette, Jacquot)
- Final « Nous venons monsieur et madame »
