= Doctor Ox's Experiment (opera) =

1998 opera by Gavin Bryars

- Opera by Gavin Bryars
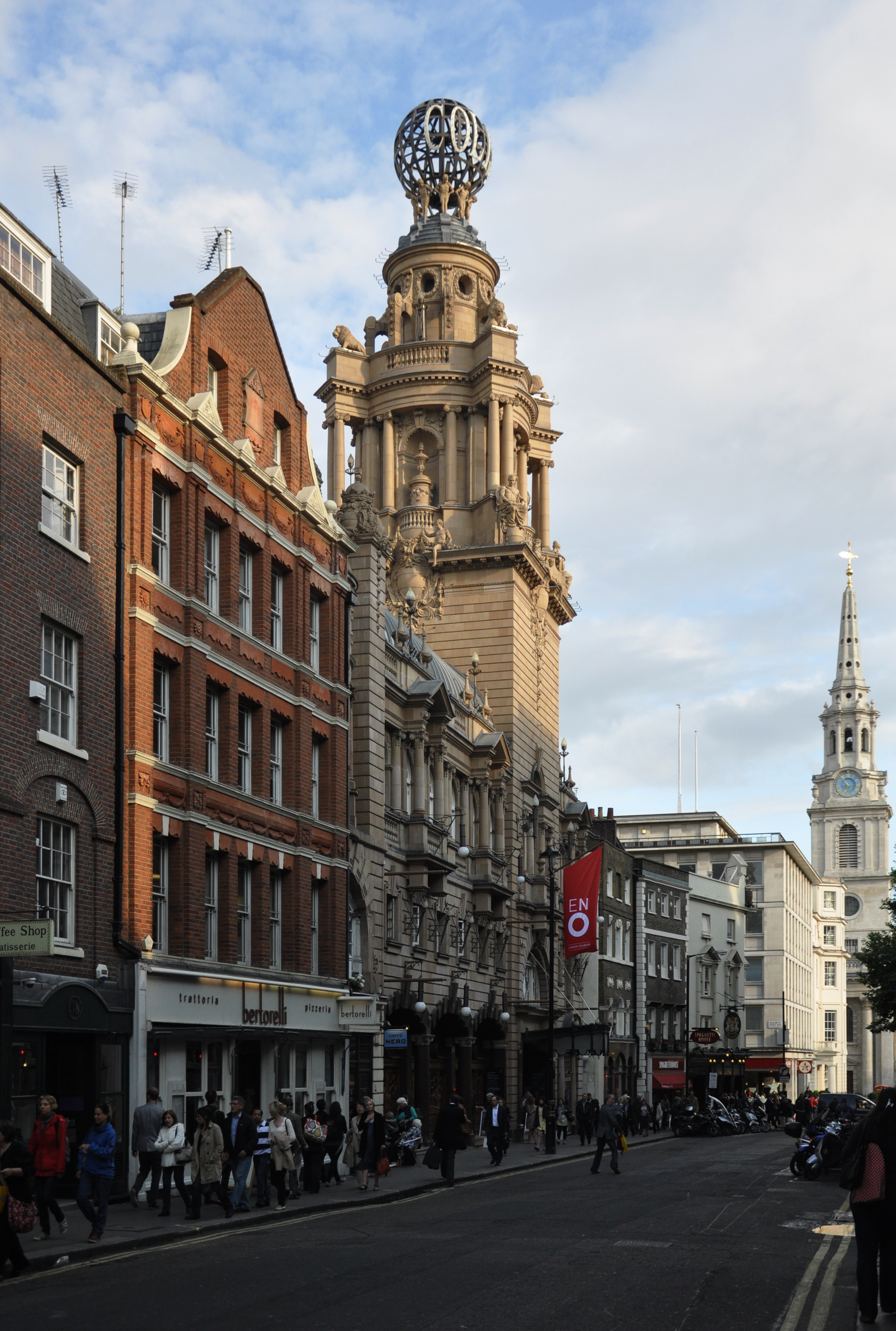
- The London Coliseum, where the opera was first performed
- Librettist: Blake Morrison
- Based on: Dr. Ox's Experiment by Jules Verne
- Premiere: 15 June 1998; London Coliseum

Doctor Ox's Experiment is an opera in two acts by Gavin Bryars. It has an English-language libretto by Blake Morrison after the novella of the same name by Jules Verne. It was first performed on 15 June 1998 at the London Coliseum by English National Opera (ENO) who co-commissioned the opera with BBC Television.

In the experiment of the title, Doctor Ox introduces a gas into a sedate and conservative Flemish village with the result that everyone and everything becomes speeded up and chaotic. (Ox's and his assistant's names combine to make Oxygėne, the French name for Oxygen.)` The opera explores the conflict between Ox's advocacy of modernity and scientific and political change and Ygène's belief that liberation and the accompanying loss of the traditional rhythms of life might bring unhappiness.

The music is predominantly slow-moving and quiet. Bryars allocated distinct voice types to the different types of roles: town elders, young lovers and scientists. He also included some unusual instruments in his orchestra: an oboe d'amore and an amplified jazz bass in the love scene, an electronic keyboard and a flugelhorn instead of trumpets in the brass section. The reception was mixed with several critics complaining of boredom while others wrote of members of the audience being entranced by the music.

== Composition history ==
Bryars began to think about his next opera in 1984, when he was in France for the production of Medea, his first work in the genre. The three subjects he came up with were Flaubert's Bouvard et Pécuchet, De Quincey's The Last Days of Immanuel Kant and Verne's Dr. Ox's Experiment. Unknown to Bryars, this last had already been the subject of two other operas, the opéra-bouffe Le docteur Ox by Jacques Offenbach and il Dottor Oss by Annibale Bizzelli.

The first music to materialise in connection with any of these projects was "By the Vaar", a 1987 work for jazz bass and chamber orchestra commissioned by the Camden Jazz Festival with Charlie Haden in mind. The title refers to the river that flows through the town in Verne's story and to the love scene between Frantz and Suzel that takes place on its banks. The author has been a source for several other of the composer's works. Twenty Thousand Leagues Under the Seas supplied text for three different compositions and The Green Ray provided the name and inspiration for his saxophone concerto.

Bryars approached Blake Morrison in May 1988 with the suggestion of working on an opera based on Verne's novella. At the time Morrison knew neither the Verne story nor Bryars's music but he agreed to the proposal after a lunchtime meeting with the composer. They worked together on a concert piece which was premiered as Doctor Ox's Experiment (Epilogue) by the soprano Sarah Leonard and the Gavin Bryars Ensemble in November 1988.

Both composer and librettist were distracted by other projects but Dennis Marks, who had moved from the BBC to become General Director of ENO, commissioned a full-scale opera to be premiered at the Coliseum. Bryars incorporated material from both By the Vaar and Doctor Ox's Experiment (Epilogue) into the opera. The main development occurred in the period 1994–1996. Bryars and Morrison received guidance and advice from David Pountney, the opera director.

In developing the opera, Bryars and Morrison decided to flesh out some of the roles, including Ox, Ygène and Aunt Hermance. They also added a second pair of lovers. At one point, the composer considered giving the title role to American rock-singer Tom Waits, who had recorded one of the versions of Bryars's Jesus' Blood Never Failed Me Yet. Bryars was looking for a means of making Ox sound distinct from the rest of the cast but in the end decided to make it a tenor role. The opera was dedicated to Bryars's mother.

== Performance and recording history ==
The opera was given its premiere at the London Coliseum by ENO on June 15, 1998, in a production by Atom Egoyan. This was the first full-scale opera to be premiered either at the Coliseum or at the Royal Opera House for several years and came after a year's delay. Doctor Ox received four further performances during that run, one of which was broadcast on BBC Radio 3.

Valdine Anderson and David James went on to partially reprise their roles in Duets from Doctor Ox's Experiment, first performed at La Botanique, Brussels on October 16, 1998. In 1999 there was a new staging at the Opernhaus Dortmund, produced by Pascal Paul-Harang and conducted by Alexander Rumpf. The original 1988 version of the Epilogue was given in Tallinn in October 2003 sung by Anna Maria Friman, with the NYYD E ensemble conducted by Olari Elts including Bryars on bass.

Although no complete recording exists of the opera, there are two performances available of the study By the Vaar. One features the original soloist Charlie Haden (Point Music 454 126–2); the other has Bryars himself as the bassist (GB Records BCGBCD12). This work has been performed in venues in Australia, Belgium, Canada, Germany, the United Kingdom and the United States.

== Roles ==
Role	Voice type	Premiere Cast Conductor: James Holmes
Doctor Ox, a scientist	tenor	Bonaventura Bottone
Ygène, his assistant	baritone	Riccardo Simonetti
Ordibeck, a confectioner	tenor	Antony Rich
Mrs Ordibeck	mezzo-soprano	Fiona Hebenton
Van Tricasse, Mayor of Quiquendone	baritone	Nicholas Folwell
Mrs Van Tricasse	mezzo-soprano	Susanna Tudor-Thomas
Passauf, a policeman	bass	Dean Robinson
Mrs Passauf	mezzo-soprano	Ingrid Baier
Niklausse, town clerk	bass-baritone	Mark Richardson
Mrs Niklausee	mezzo-soprano	Judith Douglas
Suzel, daughter of Niklausse, fiancée of Frantz	soprano	Valdine Anderson
Frantz, son of Van Tricasse	counter-tenor	David James
Suzanne, daughter of Passauf, fiancée of Fritz	soprano	Anna-Clare Monk
Fritz, son of Ordibeck	counter-tenor	Ryland Angel
Aunt Hermance, sister of Niklausse	mezzo-soprano	Della Jones
A teenager	soprano	Carole Marnoch
First Man	baritone	Gary Coward
Second Man	tenor	David Morris
Third man	tenor	Philip Bell
Valentine in Les Huguenots	coloratura mezzo-soprano	Susan Parry
Raoul in Les Huguenots	tenor	John Hudson
Citizens of Quiquendone, workers, soldiers	Chorus (SATB)	

== Music ==
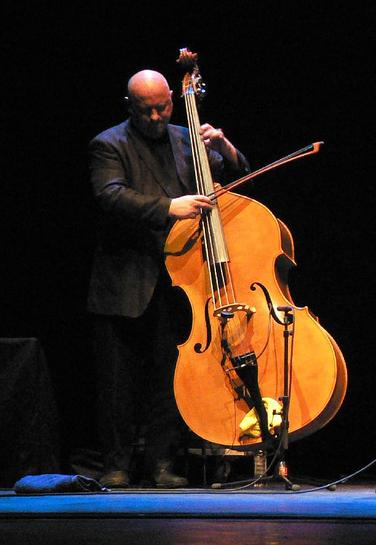
Gavin Bryars playing the double bass, the instrument for which he includes an improvising part in Doctor Ox and which he played in performances of Doctor Ox's Experiment (Epilogue)

The opera is scored for 2 flutes, the second doubling piccolo, 2 oboes, 1 doubling oboe d'amore, and the other doubling cor anglais, a clarinet and bass clarinet, a bassoon and contrabassoon, 4 horns, a flugelhorn, 4 trombones, a bass trombone, 1 timpanist, 3 percussionists, harp, electronic keyboard doubling piano and a string section consisting of at least six each first and second violins, 5 violas, four cellos and 3 double basses, including at least one bass with a 5th string or low extension, plus an improvising jazz player on amplified bass. The percussion consists of marimba, vibraphone, glockenspiel, crotales, tubular bells, cow bells, bass drum, tam-tam, sizzle cymbal, suspended cymbal, mark-tree, Chinese bell-tree and wind-machine.

Bryars wanted the scenes with the lovers to "have something of the purity of early music" and pointed to the obbligato oboe d'amore and the "relatively light orchestral textures" as means by which he achieved this. The improvisation by the amplified jazz bass is confined to the scene by the Vaar though the instrument is also used in the epilogue. The flugelhorn replaced the trumpet of the traditional brass section because it is "mellower [and] less assertive". The bass clarinet was included for several reasons. It had doubled the jazz bass parts in the two study works for the opera. It was an instrument that had a prominent role in Les Huguenots in which Meyerbeer exploited modifications in the instrument's mechanism, developed by Adolphe Sax who, like most of the characters in Dr Ox, was Belgian.

Bryars chose to distinguish the character types through the vocal ranges they were given. The adults of the town are largely given deep voices, bass and bass-baritone for the men, contralto and mezzo-soprano for the women. The lovers have high voices, soprano and counter-tenor. In order to make the scientists sound unlike the townspeople, Bryars made Ox a tenor and Ygène a baritone, both parts being agile, lyric and relatively high in their voice range.

The music is post-modern and largely quiet and slow-moving. One critic describes it as "suffused with a melancholy sweetness that drowns all differences," while another compares the epilogue to "slow-motion Mahler". The climactic moments of each act violate the established pattern in different ways: The fastest tempo of the opera appears in the chaos of the performance of Les Huguenots; the explosion in Act II has the loudest dynamics.

== Reception ==
The critical reception that Doctor Ox received was mixed. David Murray of the Financial Times summed the contrasted reactions up as follows. "For some of the audience, clearly, the word for the opera would be 'paralytic'. Others found it mysteriously, even hypnotically beautiful." Norman Lebrecht noted a contrast between the views of the critics and the audience:

... hardly any music critic had a kind word to say. "Awful" and "tedious" was the general verdict... My companion, an unjaded musician from Prague, came away entranced... On opening night, I noticed, the loudest cheers came from the under-30s. After five performances, and despite a poisonous press, the good Doctor achieved an 83 per cent attendance and a decent chance of revival. So who was right, critics or audience?

His own reaction was positive. "Doctor Ox was aurally alluring, with a row of lyrical ideas flowering from a Straussian seed-bed and just enough drama to justify the stage business – but I was there to enjoy, not review."

Michael White in the Independent on Sunday considered that the opera "is more an aesthetic experience than a dramatic one." He expressed a liking for the hues brought out in the instrumental writing and for the vocal lines and picked out the love scene and Suzel's final monologue as highlights. But his conclusion was that, although "the sounds are sometimes ravishing", the overall work was " invertebrate, a shapeless, spineless lump of aural jelly." Paul Griffiths found a mixture of beauty and boredom in "a conceptual artist's opera, put together in a spirit of detachment and disbelief."

Among the most hostile critics was Rupert Christiansen: "Short of a week's exposure to the relentless drip-drip-drip of Chinese water-torture, I can conceive of no more excruciatingly tedious experience than watching and listening to Doctor Ox's Experiment, a new opera." Michael Tanner's view was similar.

I wish I could dissent from the general, though not universal, chorus of dispraise that has greeted this long-awaited and fairly long-delayed opera; but unless it has secrets to yield up – and one of the main reasons for feeling so dispirited as it went on was the sense that one might be even more bored, if possible, during a subsequent hearing than during the first – the majority verdict is all too depressingly right.

More positively, Keith Potter thought that Bryars had shown wisdom in selecting a story whose setting suited his taste for slow-moving music and "laid-back nonchalance". In contrast to some others Potter felt that "Bryars makes ... a success of the ensuing action, which demands, and receives, quicker changes of mood and tempo and the establishment of a real dramatic momentum."

Paul Driver found the premiere "something of a triumph".

Doctor Ox's Experiment is a real, singable, musically self-justifying opera, with many of the medium's traditional strengths, if always at a deceptive angle to tradition. It is a work of pungent originality that is never "experimentalist" in the way of earlier Bryars works, but makes a surprisingly close approach to mainstream repertoire.

Morrison's libretto was appreciated by various critics as "charming" and for having "wit and characterful colours" and supplying "jaunty lines ... some individual characters, dramatic story-telling". Tanner, however, thought the text rather opaque and found the problem of comprehension aggravated by the high vocal lines which made it difficult to make out the words.

== Synopsis ==
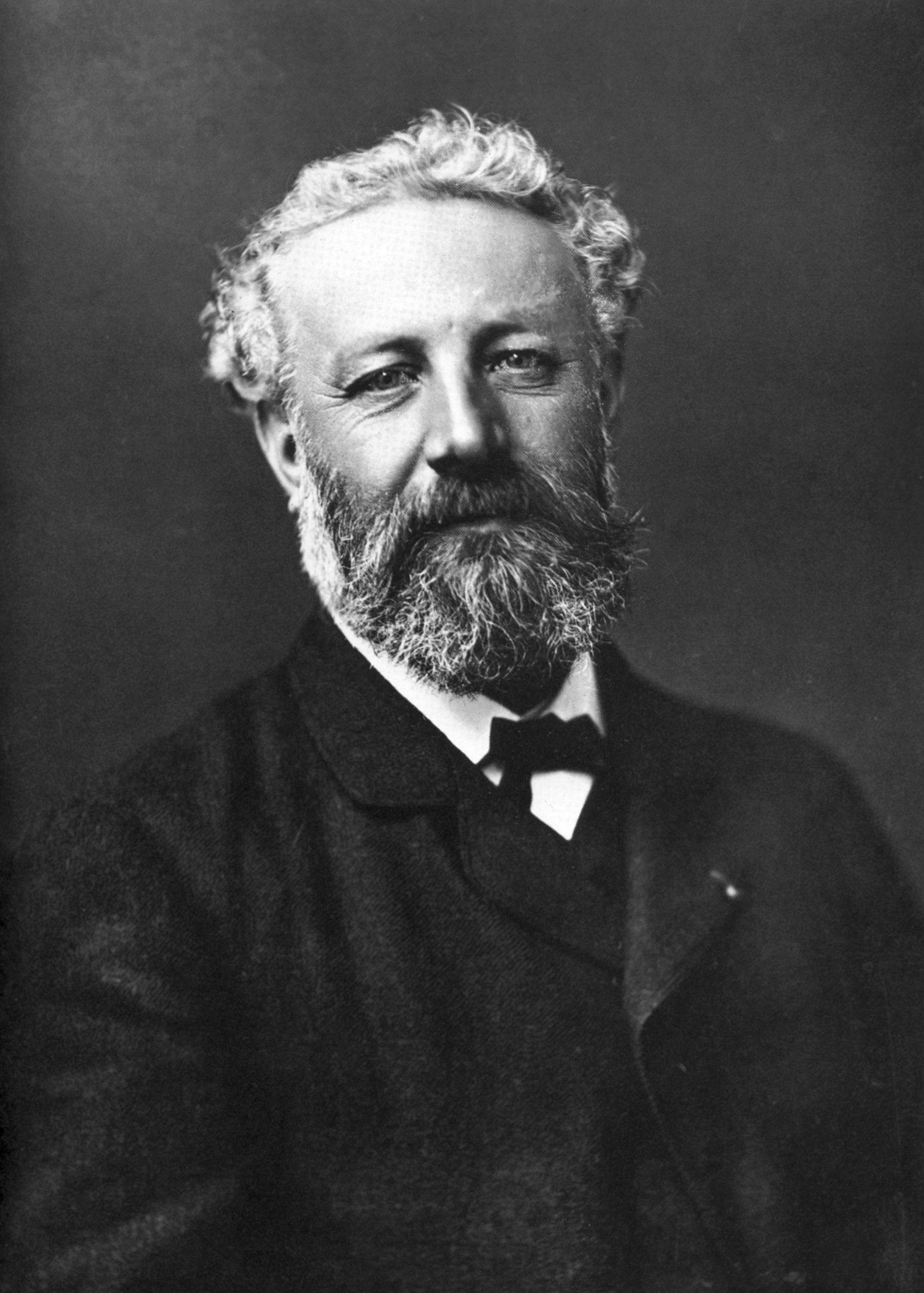
Jules Verne, the author of the original Dr. Ox's Experiment

The opera is set during the nineteenth century in the fictional Flemish town of Quiquendone.

=== Act I ===
Doctor Ox and Ygène chance upon Quiquendone which, as the chorus sings, is not on any map. The townspeople celebrate their sedate existence and have their tea while discussing small matters. Three scenes then go on in parallel.

In their laboratory, Ox and his assistant set up their equipment. When Ygène questions the wisdom of their experiment, Ox praises the wonders that science will bring mankind. He looks forward to his bright lighting and how the "oxhydric" gas he plans to introduce in his experiment will light up the slow lives of the locals. Ygène expresses concern that there might be an explosion but Ox says that everything will be safe.

In the town hall, the members of the town council decide that it is rather hasty to come to a decision about creating a new post after just ten years of discussion. They continue agreeing to pass no resolutions on other matters. They discuss Ox's request for a meeting.

In the town square, the two pairs of lovers and Hermance, their chaperone, sing about how their courtship should not be hurried; engagements should last the same ten years it takes to train as a doctor.

While Ox's workers lay pipes, the chorus wonder what Ox is up to and what his background is but there are just contradictory rumours. The leading citizens visit Ox and, after initially complaining about his starting work without permission, find themselves telling him to accelerate his plans and get everything ready in a week.

By the river Vaar, Frantz and Suzel look forward to their wedding which is now only five years away.

Ygène questions whether the townspeople would agree to their lives being speeded up in their experiment. Ox dismisses this as comparable to asking if animals agree to be vivisected. The people will learn to thank him.

The town has gathered to watch a performance of Meyerbeer's opera Les Huguenots and this is Ox's chosen occasion for his experiment. Things start slowly and then speed up and become chaotic as the experiment proceeds. The audience join in the performance. Uproar occurs. Frantz challenges Fritz to a duel for flirting with Suzel. Hermance is left alone when everyone else has left the theatre. She wonders what has happened. She is sure someone must pay.

=== Act II ===
The experiment is now in full flow with the gas affecting the townspeople's thinking. About half the town, including Frantz and Suzanne, talk revolution. Others give themselves to pleasure. Fritz and Suzel sing of making love until the day they die. The political agitators intend to overthrow the town council but Niklausse and Van Tricasse persuade them instead to attack a neighbouring town over an incident 700 years earlier involving a stray cow. Frantz is appointed the war leader for pledging to kill the most people.

Ox is thinking about his next research when Niklausse and Van Tricasse come to demand new weapons. Ox agrees to supply something. Ygène wants to stop the experiment but Ox says it should proceed whatever the cost.

Niklausse and Van Tricasse climb up the clock tower to survey the troops. They are at first argumentative, then calm down and help each other in the clean air at the top. They agree they must stop the war but, once they reach the polluted air, they argue again in their urgency to get to war.

Ygène becomes more and more agitated by the results of the experiment. The army calls for more gas but no one is in the laboratory.

There is an explosion.

Although the town is badly damaged, everyone is back to their normal selves. Suzel and Frantz are together again, but she wonders if his feelings really are the same. Ygène is heard calling for Ox.

== Sources ==
- Gavin Bryars "On and Around Doctor Ox". Six unnumbered pages in Reed (1998).
- Gavin Bryars (2009) "Duets from Doctor Ox's Experiment" entry at composer's website. Accessed 20 December 2011.
- Rupert Christiansen "Experiment that went horribly wrong", The Daily Telegraph, 20 Jun 1998. Accessed 18 December 2011.
- Paul Driver "Just what the doctor ordered – Opera", The Sunday Times, June 21, 1998. Accessed through NewsBank Record Number: 959823912, 18 December 2011.
- Paul Griffiths "Music Review; Gliding Slowly, Slowly, Always Detached", The New York Times, 18 June 1998. Accessed 18 December 2011.
- Norman Lebrecht "Critics do matter", The Daily Telegraph, 15 August 1998, accessed 18 December 2011.
- Blake Morrison "Jules Verne, Gavin Bryars and Me". Six unnumbered pages in Reed (1998).
- David Murray "The Arts: A slow high on thin air: Opera: David Murray reviews the premiere of Gavin Bryars' ' Doctor Ox's Experiment'", The Financial Times (London Edition), Wednesday, 17 June 1998, p. 18. Accessed through NewsBank Record Number: B0IFQALAFTFT, 17 December 2011.
- Keith Potter "Opera: Life's a gas for the laid-back doctor – Dr Ox's Experiment Coliseum London", The Independent, Thursday, June 18, 1998. Accessed through NewsBank Record Number: 980618in010001, 18 December 2011.
- Philip Reed (1998) Programme book for ENO first production, London, English National Opera.
- Schott Music (undated) "Doctor Ox's Experiment" page at publishers' website. Accessed 11 December 2011.
- Schott Music (undated) 2 "By the Vaar" page at publishers' website. Accessed 11 December 2011.
- Laurence Senelick "Outer Space, Inner Rhythms:the concurrences of Jules Verne and Jacques Offenbach", Nineteenth Century Theatre and Film, vol. 30, no. 1, June 2003, pp. 1–10 accessed 13 December 2011.
- Michael Tanner "Punishing Evening", The Spectator, 27 Jun 1998. Accessed via Google cached version of article on ProQuest, 18 December 2011.
- Michael White "Music: It's a pretty slow experiment", The Independent on Sunday, 21 June 1998. Accessed through NewsBank Record Number: 980621is006007, 18 December 2011.
