= Jules Noriac =

French writer

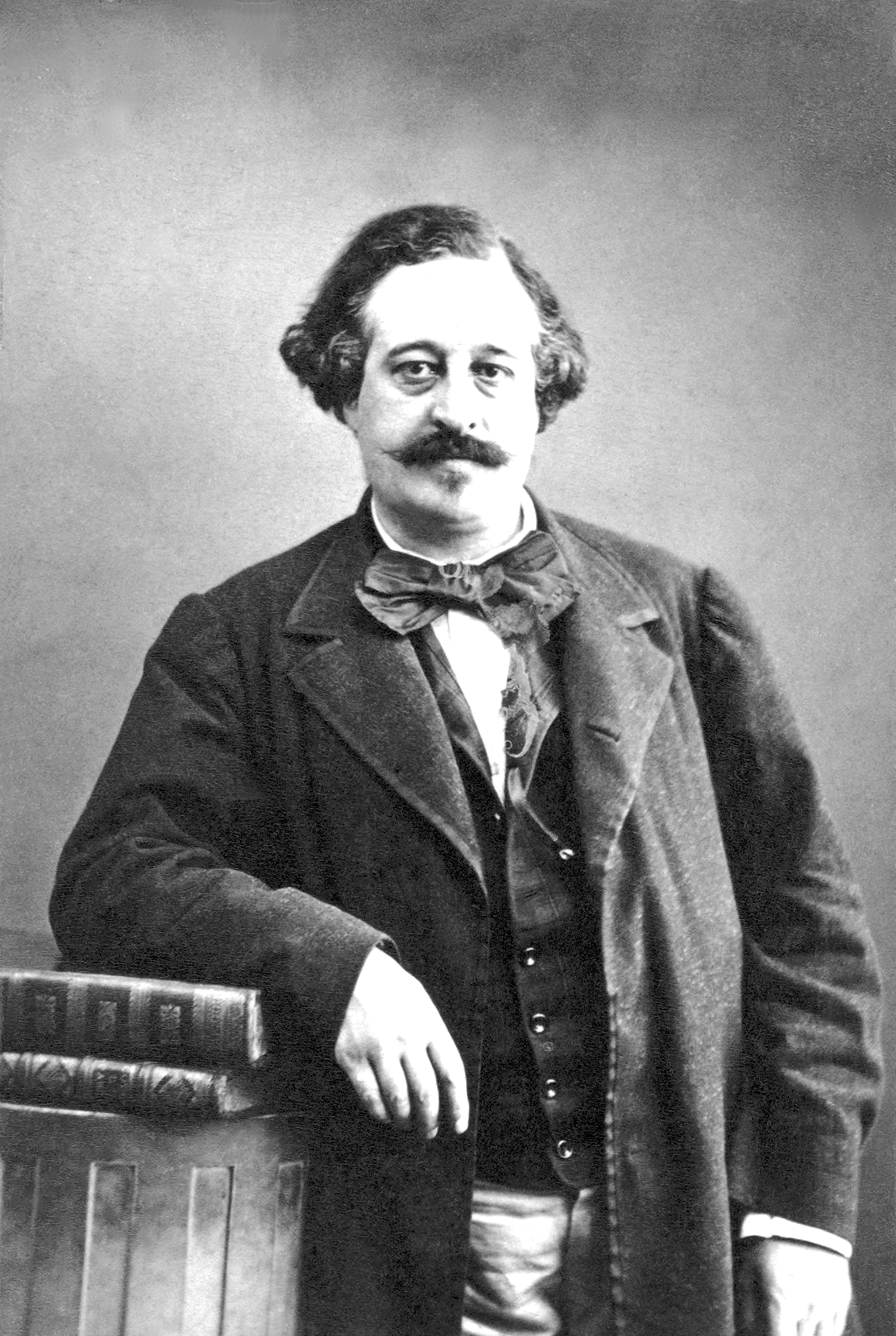
- Jules Noriac's portrait by Nadar, 1873
- Born: Claude Antoine Jules Cairon; 24 April 1827; Limoges
- Died: 1 October 1882 (aged 55); Paris
- Occupations: Journalist, playwright, writer, librettist and theatre director.

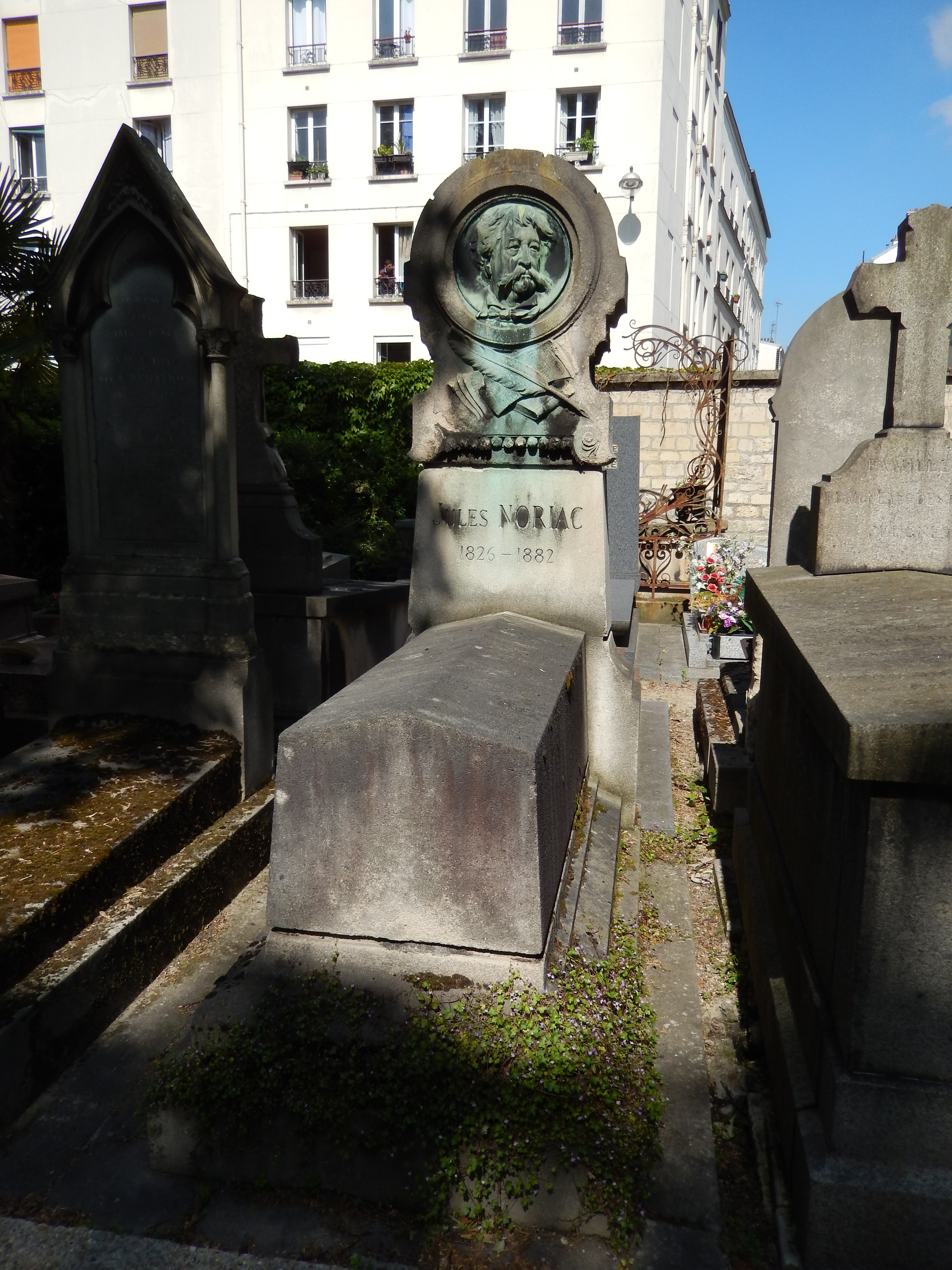
Grave of Jules Noriac in Montmartre.

Jules Noriac, real name Claude Antoine Jules Cairon, (24 April 1827 – 1 October 1882), was a French journalist, playwright, writer, librettist and theatre director.

== Biography ==
Cairon was first a journalist and columnist in many newspapers. He started successively at the Corsair in 1850, the Gazette de France in 1851, the National Assembly in 1853, then as editor of Le Figaro weekly of which he was one of the main editors. He worked simultaneously with the Revue fantaisiste, the Gazette de Paris, La Silhouette, the Revue des Beaux Arts, L'Univers illustré and became successively chief-editor of the Figaro-programme, the Soleil and the Nouvelles (1865–66).

He also wrote plays, operetta libretti and novels under the pseudonym Jules Noriac.

He was co-managing director of the Théâtre des Variétés from 1856 to 1869 and of the Théâtre des Bouffes-Parisiens from 1868 to 1879.

Jules Noriac was awarded with the Spanish Order of Charles III.

== Works ==
Tales

- 1870: Histoire du siège de Paris
- Les Gens de Paris
- Dictionnaire des amoureux

Novels and short stories

- 1859: Le 101 Régiment
- 1860: La Bêtise humaine
- 1861: Le Grain de sable
- 1863: Les Mémoires d'un baiser
- 1863: La Dame à la plume noire
- 1865: Le Journal d'un flâneur
- 1866: Le Capitaine Sauvage
- Le Chevalier de Cerny
- La Comtesse de Bruges
- La Falaise d'Houlgate
- Mademoiselle Poucet
- Sur le rail
- 1862: La Boîte au lait
- 1873: Le Mouton enragé
- 1876: La Maison verte

Operettas

- 1870: Les Baisers d'alentour, Théâtre des Bouffes Parisiens
- 1871: Le Barbier de Trouville, music by Charles Lecocq
- 1872: la Timbale d'argent, 3 acts, with Eugène Grangé, music by Léon Vasseur, Bouffes Parisiens
- 1873: la Petite Reine, 3 acts, with Jaime, music by Vasseur, Bouffes Parisiens
- 1875: la Branche cassée, 3 acts, with Jules Moinaux, music by Vasseur, Théâtre Taitbout
- 1876: la Boîte au lait, operetta in 4 acts, music by Offenbach, Bouffes Parisiens
- 1876: Pierrette et Jacquot, 1 act, with Gille, music by Offenbach, Bouffes Parisiens
- 1877: La Sorrentine, 3 acts, with Moineaux, music by Vasseur, Bouffes Parisiens
