= Men of the Mountain =

1943 film

- Directed by: Aldo Vergano
- Written by: Alessandro Blasetti; Corrado Pavolini; Alberto Spaini; Aldo Vergano; Sergio Pugliese; Gino Betrone; Raffaele Luciani
- Starring: Amedeo Nazzari; Mariella Lotti; Mario Ferrari
- Cinematography: Arturo Climati; Mario Craveri
- Edited by: Fernando Cerchio
- Music by: Annibale Bizzelli
- Production companies: Lux Film; Associati Produttori Indipendenti Film
- Distributed by: Lux Film
- Release date: 15 March 1943
- Running time: 85 minutes
- Country: Italy
- Language: Italian

Men of the Mountain (Italian: Quelli della montagna) is a 1943 Italian war drama film directed by Aldo Vergano and starring Amedeo Nazzari, Mariella Lotti and Mario Ferrari. Along with The Three Hundred of the Seventh, it was one of a handful of films portraying the Alpini units of the Italian Army.

It was shot at Cinecittà Studios in Rome. The film's sets were designed by the art director Vittorio Valentini.

== Cast ==
- Amedeo Nazzari as Il tenente Andrea Fontana
- Mariella Lotti as La dottoressa Maria Algardi
- Mario Ferrari as Il capitano Piero Sandri
- Ori Monteverdi as Pina
- Cesco Baseggio as Il maggiore
- Nico Pepe as Il tenente medico Giordano
- Nino Cobelli as Martorello
- Giuseppe Pagliarini as Morticoni
- Sennuccio Benelli as Varale
- Walter Lazzaro as L'aiutante del maggiore

== Bibliography ==
- Ruth Ben-Ghiat. Italian Fascism's Empire Cinema. Indiana University Press, 2015.
