= Antoine Simon (composer) =

French composer, director and pianist

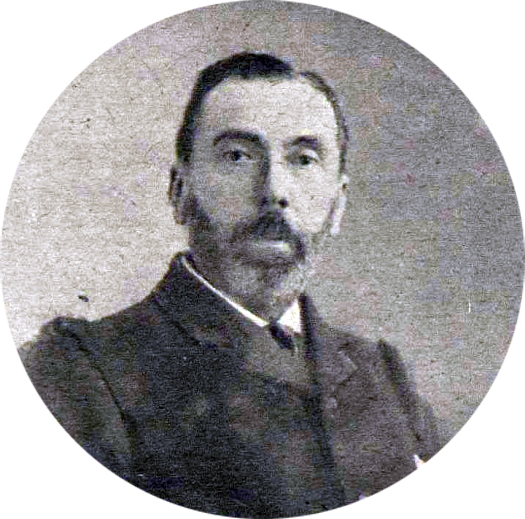
Antoine Simon

Antoine Simon, commonly known as Anton Simon (Russian: Антон Юльевич Симон) (5 August 1850 – 1 February [O.S. 19 January] 1916), was a French composer, director and pianist, who made most of his career in Russia.

== Biography ==
Born in Paris, Antoine Simon studied at Conservatoire de Paris in the piano class of Antoine François Marmontel and the composition class of Jules Duprato.

Aged 21, Antoine Simon left for Moscow where he settled permanently. He was hired as a composer (Kapellmeister) for the Théâtre des Bouffes in Moscow and taught the piano for musical classes of the Philharmonic Society of Moscow. In 1897, he was appointed inspector of orchestras of the imperial theaters.

== Work ==
Antoine Simon was one of the few composers in Russia at the time to create works for wind instruments such as the quartet-like sonata Op. 23 for two cornets, alto horn and trombone, or his twenty-two small pieces for ensemble, Op. 26, composed in 1887. Simon also composed three operas and a number of piano pieces. His Piano Concerto in A major, Op. 19 met with some success, as did his Clarinet Concerto, Op. 31 and his Fantaisie concertante for cello and orchestra, Op. 42. He also composed a Piano Trio in D minor, Op. 16, a String Quartet in A major, Op. 24, etc.

Simon also composed orchestrations for the ballet Don Quixote by Ludwig Minkus, in particular for the Danse de Mercedes and several variations, such as that of the dryads in the dream tableau. Antoine Simon composed his own compositions for ballet as well, like La Fille de Gudule, whose choreography was by Alexander Alexeyevich Gorsky, Les Étoiles (1898) by Khlioustine, Les Fleurs vivantes (1899), performed at Bolshoi Theatre.

Simon died in Moscow. His archives are kept in Glinka Museum in Moscow.

== Collaboration with Gorski ==
Antoine Simon collaborated with the talented Alexander Alexeyevich Gorsky from the arrival of the latter in Moscow. They began working on Gorsky's version of Don Quixote by Minkus. Antoine Simon worked some variations, and especially composed various dances. The première took place 6 December 1900 at Bolshoi under the name L'Espagnol (the Spaniard).

By the end of 1901, they started working on La Fille de Gudule, ballet inspired by Victor Hugo's The Hunchback of Notre-Dame. This theme was not new in the field of dance, since it was also that of La Esmeralda by Jules Perrot. However, Simon's ballet differed from the latter because the focus was on mass scenes: real crowds moved in front of the audience, in a show of four acts and nine tableaux.

Gorski has carefully prepared for this work; he also went to Paris in order to assimilate the locations of the plot of this ballet which premiered 24 November 1902 at Bolshoi, on a music by Simon, theatrical scenery by Konstantin Korovin and costumes by Aleksander Golovin. Heinrich Arends ("Arends Andrei Fedorovich" in Russian) directed the orchestra. The performers were:

- Esmeralda: E. Grimaldi (then S.F. Fiodorova)
- Claude Frollo: Vassili Helzer
- Captain Phoebus: N. Mordkine
- Quasimodo: N.P. Domachov
- Gringoire: K.A. Beck
- Gudule: M.A. Drougachtcheva
