= Victor Frédéric Verrimst =

French composer and double-bassist (1825–1893)

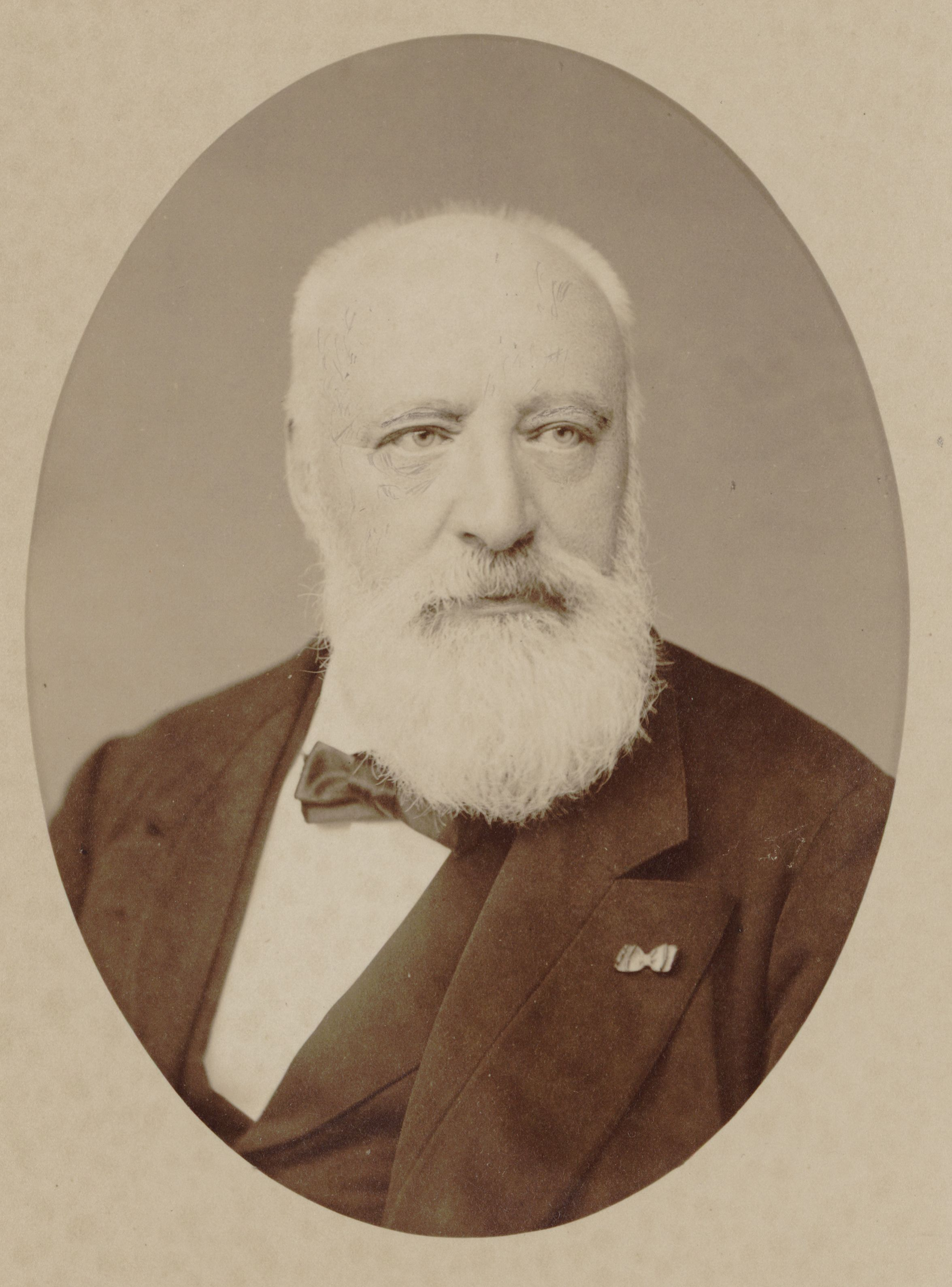
Victor Frédéric Verrimst, photograph by Pierre Petit

Victor Frédéric Verrimst (29 November 1825 – 16 January 1893) was a French double-bassist and composer.

== Biography ==
Of Belgian ancestry, Verrimst was born in Paris and studied double-bass at the Conservatoire de Paris in Louis François Chaft's class as well as harmony with Antoine Elwart and counterpoint with Simon Leborne. A winner of the first prizes in these disciplines at the Conservatoire, he became a musician in the orchestra of the Opéra-Comique, then became bass soloist with the orchestra of the Opéra de Paris, at the Orchestre de la Société des Concerts du Conservatoire and played in the personal music of Napoleon III.

Verrimst was also maître de chapelle of the église Saint-Thomas-d'Aquin then of the Church of Saint-Bernard de la Chapelle and double-bass professor at the Conservatoire de Paris. In this capacity, he was the author of a textbook for the double bass, which was in use at the Conservatoire, as well as a Solfège du contrebassiste. But Verrimst did not limit himself to writing for the double-bass. He composed several masses and motets, various songs and piano works, a fantasy for trombone as well as an important collection of harmonized rounds and popular songs, published in two volumes.

He died in Houilles aged 67.

== Bibliography ==
- François-Joseph Fétis: Biographie universelle des musiciens et bibliographie générale de la musique, volume 8 (Paris: Firmin-Didot, 1867), p. 331.
- François-Joseph Fétis and Arthur Pougin: Biographie universelle des musiciens et bibliographie générale de la musique: Supplément et complément, volume 2 (Paris: Firmin-Didot, 1880), pp. 616–617.
