= Arnold Mortier =

French journalist, playwright and librettist

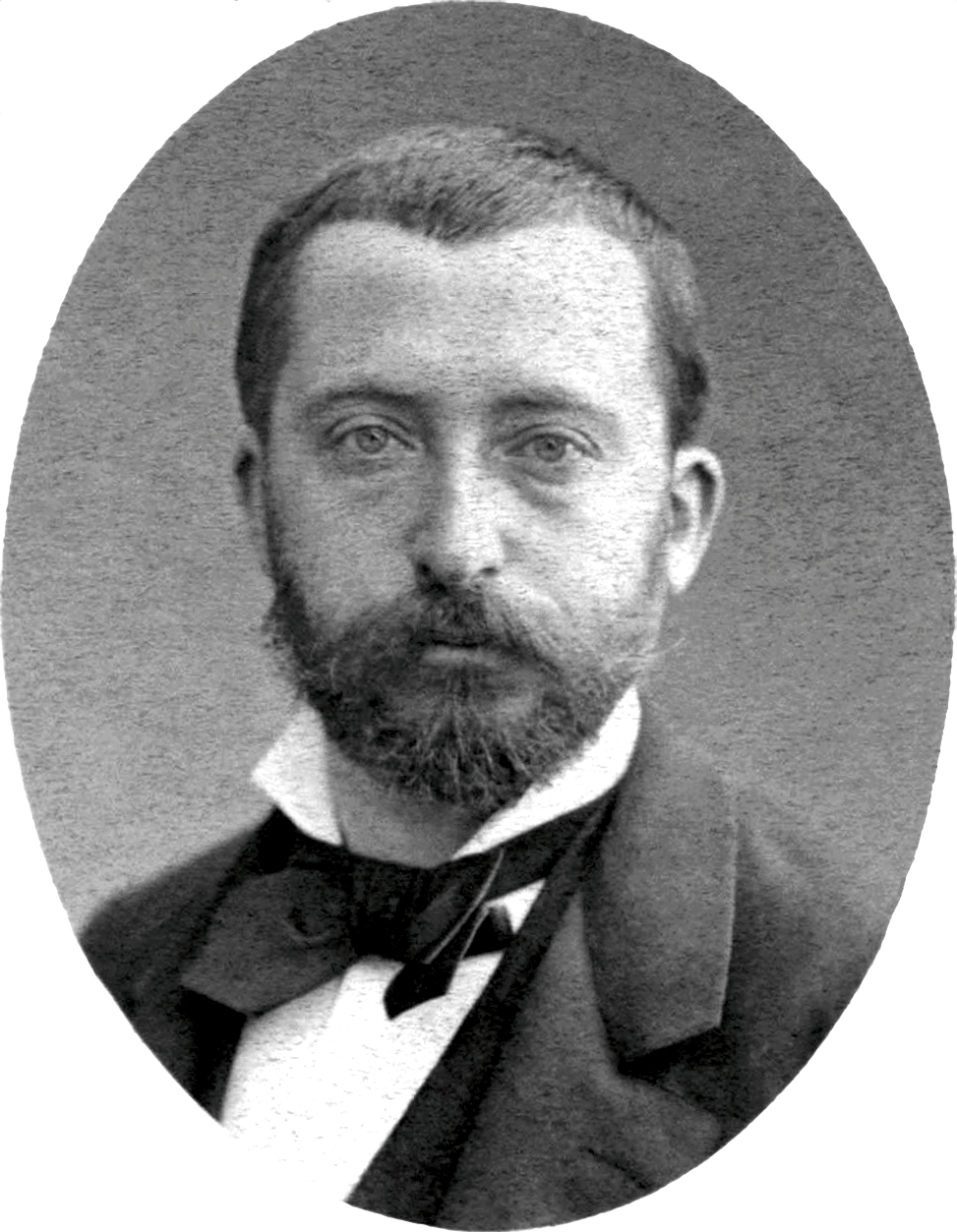
Portrait of Arnold Mortier

Arnold Mortier (1843 – 2 January 1885) was a 19th-century French journalist, playwright, and librettist.

Arnold Mortier was responsible for the drama column at Le Figaro, gathered in a collection entitled Les soirées parisiennes de 18NN par un Monsieur de l'orchestre.

Mortier cosigned the libretto of the opéra-bouffe Le docteur Ox by Jacques Offenbach, adapted from the 1872 short story Une fantaisie du docteur Ox by Jules Verne.

== Works ==
- Le manoir de Pictordu (for Gaston Serpette, with Albert de Saint-Albin) (1875)
- Le voyage dans la lune (for Jacques Offenbach, with Albert Vanloo and Eugène Leterrier) (1875)
- Le docteur Ox (for Offenbach, with Philippe Gille) (1877)
- Yedda (for Olivier Métra, with Gille) (1879)
- L'arbre de Noël (for Charles Lecocq and Georges Jacobi, with Vanloo and Leterrier) (1880)
- Madame le diable (for Serpette, with Henri Meilhac) (1882)
- La farandole (for Théodore Dubois, with Gille) (1885)
