= Antoine Elwart =

French composer and musicologist (1808–1877)

Antoine Aimable Elie Elwart
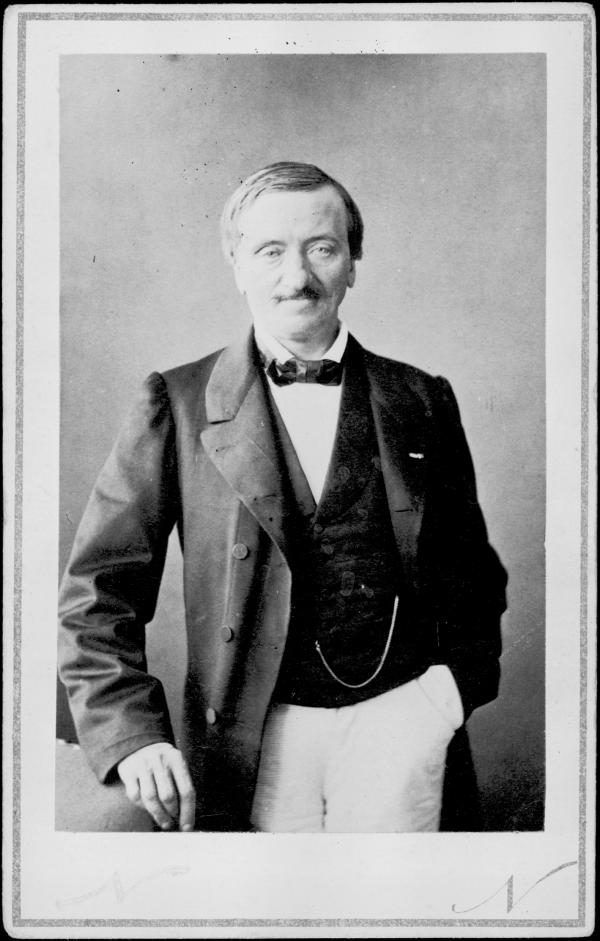
- Antoine Elwart by Nadar
- Born: 18 November 1808; Paris, France
- Died: 17 October 1877 (aged 68); Paris
- Education: Conservatoire de Paris
- Occupation: Music educator
- Awards: Légion d'honneur

Antoine Aimable Elie Elwart (18 November 1808 – 14 October 1877) was a French composer and musicologist.

== Biography ==
=== Childhood ===
The son of Polish parents, Antoine Aimable Elie Elwart was born in Paris, France on 18 November 1808. At the age of ten, he became a chorister at the mastery of the Saint-Eustache church: Antoine Ponchard (a master of the chapel since 1815) ensured his first musical training. This teaching marked him for all his life, and spiritual music remained one of his great influences.

Curious to discover the activity of professional musicians, he escaped from the work of manufacturer of crates where his parents had sent him and managed to become second violin in a street orchestra. In 1823, at the age of fifteen, a mass with four voices and a large orchestra of his composition was given at St-Roch Church.

=== Training ===
In 1825, the singer Cambon interpreted a scene by Elwart on the motif of the "Exiled". This year marked especially his entrance to the École royale de musique (the future Conservatoire de Paris) in counterpoint, harmony and fugue and music composition classes. His professors were François-Joseph Fétis, Jean-François Lesueur and later, Anton Reicha.

Elwart was awarded the First Fugue Prize in 1830. In 1835, he performed a new Mass for Saint Cecilia. He attempted the Grand prix de Rome in 1831 with the cantata La Fuite de Bianca Capello but only won second prize.

=== Prix de Rome ===
He had to wait until 1834 to win the Grand Prix with L'Entrée en loge, a cantata composed on a text by Jean François Gail. He thus became a boarder at the Villa Medici. He left his post as a tutor for the composing class of Antoine Reicha during his stay at Villa Medici.

Already known to the Parisian public, he played in France his compositions that he sent from Rome. He produced a Deuxième messe solennelle in 1835 dedicated to the Duchess of Orleans, an Italian opera and the funeral Omaggio alla memoria di Vincenzo Bellini (November 1835, Teatro Valle, Rome) in hommage to the famous opera composer who died shortly before. He presented an Ouverture on 20 October 1838, badly received by a skeptical jury and against possible innovations: the three voices of men on the second motif in E minor probably left a bitter taste.

=== Career at the Conservatoire ===
Back in Paris in 1837, he returned to the Conservatoire, but became assistant professor of Reicha, then holder of his own class created by Cherubini, the director of the Conservatoire de Paris. Elwart held the post until his retirement in 1871. Among his pupils were Louis-Aimé Maillart, Georges Bousquet, Théodore Gouvy, Jean-Baptiste Weckerlin, Émile Prudent, Olivier Métra, Edmond Hocmelle, Adolphe Blanc, Albert Gisarn, Victor Frédéric Verrimst and Oscar Comettant who described him as "an ingenious and witty scholar". It seems that he had a good relationship with his pupils, the latter ironically calling him "little father Elwart".

In parallel with his classes, Antoine Elwart was a prolific composer: he wrote a Messe solennelle in 1838 for the baptism of the Comte de Paris (future pretender "Philippe VII"), and presented on 24 August. On 4 February, he had a mass played at the église St. Eustache, with Pierre-Louis Dietsch as the organist and Ambroise Thomas as the conductor.

Elwart died in the 18th arrondissement of Paris.

== Decorations ==
He received the Royal and Distinguished Spanish Order of Charles III by King Charles III of Spain. King Frederick II of Prussia (Frederick the Great) decorated him with the Order of the Red Eagle. He was awarded the French order of the Légion d'honneur in 1873 in the salle du Conservatoire in the Conservatoire de Paris, a distinction to which he responded in the tone of humour: Vive la République!

You understand, I made a cantata to celebrate the glory of Charles X. He did not decorate me; I celebrated in music the virtues of Louis Philippe, he did not decorate me; I have sung the blessings of the Empire, the Emperor has not decorated me; I have never done anything for the Republic, and it decorates me; It is only right that I am grateful to it!

== Works ==
- 1823: Messe, for four voices and grand orchestra
- 1831: La Fuite de Bianca Capello, cantata
- 1832: Cäcilienmesse
- 1834: L'Entrée en loge, cantata
- 1835: Deuxième Messe solennelle
- 1835: Omaggio alla memoria di Vicenzo Bellini
- 1838: Messe solennelle
- Miserere for eight solo singers
- 1840: Les Catalans, opera (Rouen)
- 1845: Noé ou le Déluge universel, Symphonie-oratorio
- 1846: La Naissance d'Eve, oratorio
- 1847: Chœur de Alceste by Euripides
- 1848: Te Deum républicain
- 1850: Ruth et Booz, Symphony
- 1855: Messe for three singers and large orchestra
- 1856: Le Sommeil de Pénélope, lyrical monologue
- 1867: Premier quatuor for piano, violin, viola and cello
- 1868: Le Parnasse de Raphaël, grande allégorie scénique pour violon
- Hymne à Sainte Cécile
- La Visière, opéra comique
- Comme l'amour s'en va, opéra comique
- Le Salut impérial, cantata

== Writings ==
- 1830: Théorie musicale
- 1838: Duprez, sa vie artistique, avec une biographie authentique de son maître, Alexandre Choron (Paris, Magen)
- 1838: Heures de l'enfance, poésie de Mme Virginie Orsini, recueil de prières, cantiques et récréations, à l'usage des maisons d'éducation des deux sexes, collèges, pensionnats, écoles primaires et salles d'asile, mis en musique et précédé d'un Essai sur l'art de chanteur en chœur by A. Elwart
- 1838: Discours sur cette question : Quelles sont les causes qui ont donné naissance à la musique religieuse? Pourquoi s'est-elle écartée de son but? Et quels seraient les moyens de l'y ramener?
- 1838: Études élémentaires de la musique depuis ses premières notions jusqu'à celles de la composition, divisées en trois parties: connaissances préliminaires, méthode de chant, méthode d'harmonie
- 1839: Petit manuel d'harmonie, d'accompagnement de la basse chiffrée, de réduction de la partition au piano et de transposition musicale, contenant en outre des règles pour parvenir à écrire la basse ou un accompagnement de piano sous toute espèce de mélodie
- 1841: Feuille harmonique, contenant la théorie et la pratique de tous les accords du système moderne
- 1844: L'Art de jouer impromptu de l'alto
- 1844: Le Chanteur-accompagnateur, ou traité du clavier, de la basse chiffrée, de l'harmonie, simple et composée…
- 1844: Le Chanteur accompagnateur ou Traité du clavier, de la basse chiffrée, de l'harmonie simple et composée, suivi de la manière de faire les notes d'agrément…
- 1846: Projet relatif à l'organisation d'une chapelle-musique municipale de la ville de Paris
- 1860: Histoire de la Société des concerts du Conservatoire impérial de musique, avec dessins, musique, plans, portraits, notices biographiques
- 1862: Manuel des aspirants aux grades de sous-chefs et de chefs de musique dans l'armée
- 1864: Histoire des concerts populaires de musique classique, contenant les programmes annotés de tous les concerts donnés au Cirque Napoléon depuis leur fondation jusqu'à ce jour, suivie de six esquisses sur la vie et les œuvres de J.Haydn, Mozart, Beethoven, Weber, Mendelsohn et R. Schumann
- 1864: Histoire de la Société des Concerts populaires de musique classique
- 1865: Lutrin et orphéon, grammaire musicale dans laquelle le plain-chant et la musique sont appris en chantant des chœurs, enrichie d'airs français arrangés à 2, 3 et 4 voix égales
- 1867: Essai sur la composition chorale
- 1869: Petit traité d'instrumentation à l'usage des jeunes compositeurs
- Essai sur la composition musicale suivi de Petit manuel d'harmonie, d'accompagnement, de la basse chiffrée, de réduction de la partition au piano et de transposition musicale
- Théorie musicale, solfège progressif
- L'Art de chanter en chœur

== Quotes ==
- Elwart expresses "sympathy for the things which contribute to give a modest splendor to the so poetic cult of religion."
- "The merit of these sacred works must be observed with all the more care because it testifies to the elevated feeling of their author as much as to his disinterested love for art." Berlioz, Journal des débats 6 April 1838
- Qu'est-ce qu'un musicien? Elwart's answer published in the Univers musical 9 July 1863:

To be a musician is to have the innate feeling of the musical beauty, to understand and admire all that is great and poetic in all the schools, it is to have repulsion only for the ugly, the extravagant, the grotesque, and finally, being sufficiently master of oneself to have the courage to listen to a work that deserves this name without judging it according to the label of the bag. It means knowing how to enjoy all kinds of styles, without renouncing the sincere and unprejudiced admiration which such and such a master, this or that virtuoso, with whom our organization makes us willingly enter into a community of ideas
