= Félix Cohen =

French dramatist and author (1831–1896)

- Born: Aristide Félix Cohen; 31 December 1831; Marseilles, Kingdom of France
- Died: 17 February 1896 (aged 64); Paris, French Third Republic
- Occupations: Dramatist, author
- Relatives: Jules Cohen (brother)
- Writing career
- Language: French

Aristide Félix Cohen (31 December 1831 – 17 February 1896) was a French dramatist and author.

He was made auditor of the Conseil d'État on 28 May 1855, and held this position until 1865. His works include Étude sur les impôts et sur les budgets des principaux États de l'Europe (1865); Le club (1877); La flamboyante (1884), a comedy in three acts, written in collaboration with Paul Ferrier and Albin Valabrègue; Frappant!, a story in verse after the Provençal poet Gustave Bénédit (1887); La revanche du mari (1890), a vaudeville; Marion (1892), a comedy; and Le duc Jean (1893). F. C. Burnand adapted from La flamboyante the comedy The Saucy Sally, first performed at the Opera House in Southport in 1890.

== Publications ==
- Cohen, Félix (1865). Étude sur les impôts et sur les budgets des principaux États de l'Europe (in French). Paris: Paris Guillaumin et Cie.
- Gondinet, Edmond; Cohen, Félix (1878). Le club; comédie en trois actes (in French). Paris: Michel Lévy Frères.
- Ferrier, Paul; Cohen, Félix; Valabrègue, Albin (1884). La flamboyante; comédie en trois actes (in French). Paris: Tresse.
- Ferrier, Paul; Cohen, Félix; Valabrègue, Albin (1884). The Blazer; Comedy in Three Acts. London: Farquharson Roberts & Phillips.
- Cohen, Félix (1887). Frappant! Conte en vers, imité de Bénédit (poète provençal) (in French). Paris: Paul Ollendorff.
- Cohen, Félix (1893). Brevet élémentaire; monologue (in French). Paris: Paul Ollendorff.
- Cohen, Félix; Grenet-Dancourt, Ernest (1890). La Revanche du mari; comédie en trois actes (in French). Paris: Paul Ollendorff.
- Cohen, Félix (1892). Marion; comédie en un acte (in French). Paris: Paul Ollendorff.
- Perret, Paul; Cohen, Félix (1893). Le duc Jean (in French). Paris: Calmann-Lévy.
- Perret, Paul; Cohen, Félix (1894). La duchesse Jean (in French). Paris: Calmann-Lévy.
