= Léon Vasseur =

French composer, organist and conductor

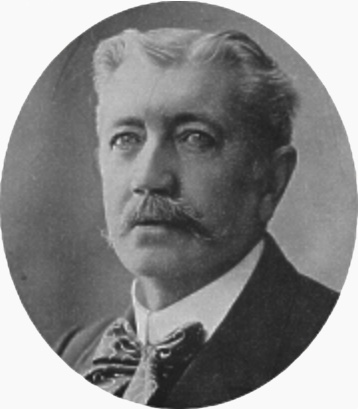
Léon Vasseur in 1909

Félix Augustin Joseph Vasseur, known as Léon Vasseur (28 May 1844 – 25 May 1917), was a French composer, organist and conductor. While working as a cathedral organist, he turned to composing operettas and soon had a hit with La timbale d'argent (1872). He wrote another thirty operettas but never repeated that early success. He also composed church music including two settings of the mass.

== Biography ==
Vasseur was born in Bapaume in north-east France, the son of Augustin Vasseur, the local church organist and choirmaster. After studying music with his father, Vasseur enrolled at the age of 12 as a student at the École Niedermeyer, the school of church music in Paris, He studied under Pierre-Louis Dietsch (harmony), Georges Schmitt (organ and improvisation) and Camille Saint-Saëns (piano), and won the school's top prizes as a pianist and organist. He left the school in 1862 and at the age of 18 was appointed organist at Saint-Symphorien, Versailles.

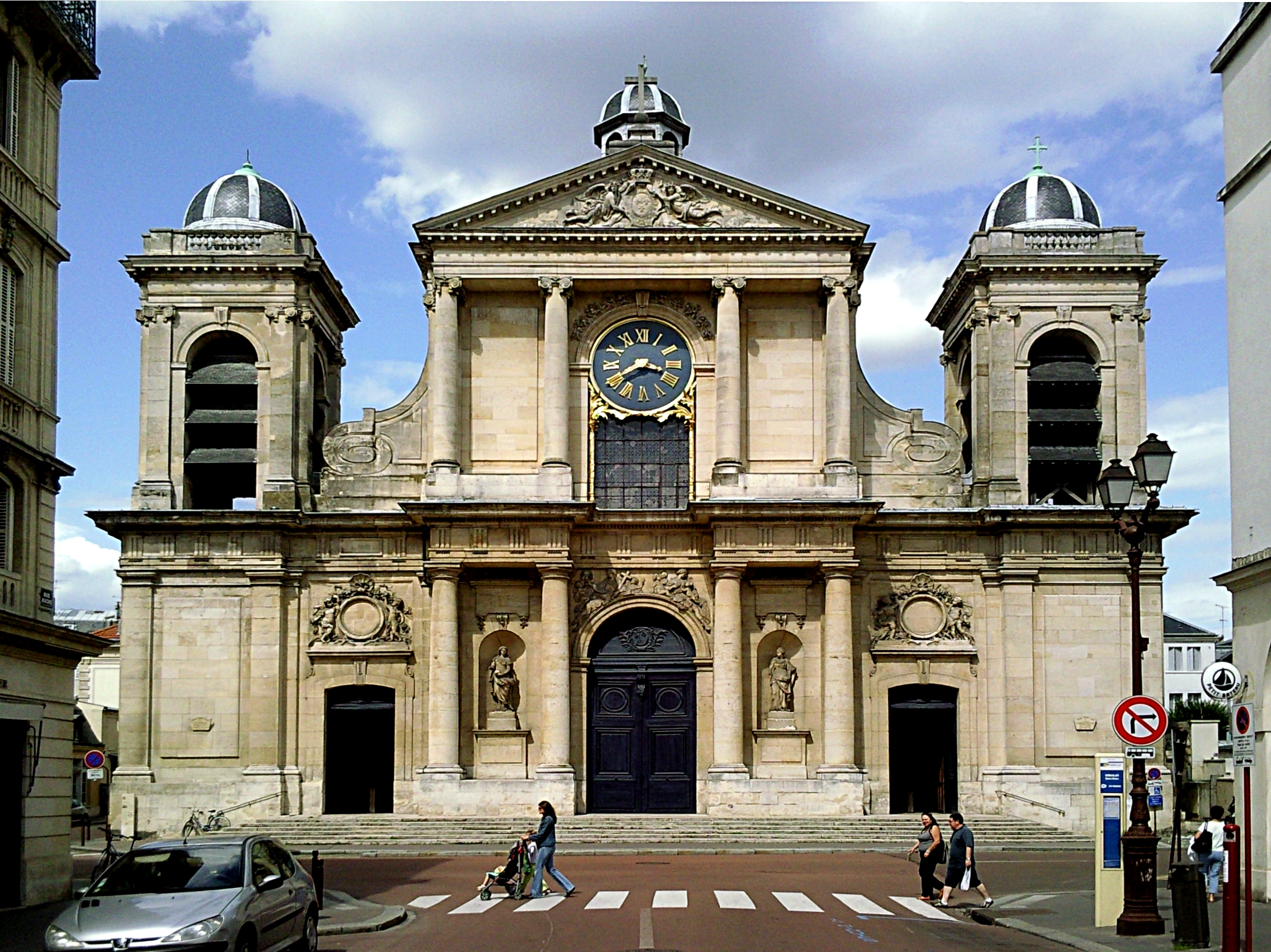
Notre-Dame de Versailles, where Vasseur was organist 1870–72

In 1870 after eight years at Saint-Symphorien, Vasseur succeeded Marie-Louise Leroi-Godefroy as organist of Notre-Dame de Versailles, the former royal parish church of the kings of France. He composed works for both his churches, including 20 motets, 2 masses, offertories, anthems and a Magnificat, and also an instruction book, Méthode d'orgue expressif ou harmonium (1867). In 1872 he resigned his post and was succeeded by Emile Renaud. Vasseur turned from the church to the theatre. His first attempt at operetta, a one-act piece called Un fi, deux fi, trois figurants, was given at the Alcazar café-chantant on 1 April 1872. It was not a success, but his second piece, La timbale d'argent (The Silver Cup), opened eight days later at the Théâtre des Bouffes Parisiens and ran for more than 200 nights. It saved the theatre from bankruptcy and confirmed Vasseur in his determination to switch from sacred to secular music. The piece was subsequently performed in America, Britain and elsewhere. Vasseur never equalled the popularity of La timbale d'argent, but his series of usually risqué operettas achieved modest success at a variety of theatres in Paris and elsewhere. The most notable of these include La cruche cassée (1875), Le droit du seigneur (1878) and Le voyage de Suzette (1889). He did not abandon sacred music completely. In 1877 his Hymne à Sainte-Cécile, for soprano, organ and orchestra, was given at Versailles Cathedral and was well received by the public and critics.

In 1879 Vasseur set himself up as an impresario. He reopened the former Théâtre Taitbout as the Nouveau Théâtre-Lyrique, but his attempt at theatre management was unsuccessful. His first production, Hymnis, a comic opera by Theodore de Banville and Jules Cressonnois, proved too heavyweight for the taste of the Parisian public, and within a year Vasseur was forced to close the theatre. He succeeded Olivier Métra as conductor of the Folies Bergère. He retired from the theatre in 1897.

Vasseur was twice married, first to Caroline Chaiselat and then to Ernestine Cavier.

Vasseur died in Asnières (Hauts-de-Seine) at the age of 72.

== Works ==
Vasseur's one-act operettas are:

- Un fi, deux fi, trois figurants (1872)
- Mon mouchoir (1872)
- Le grelot (1873)
- L'Opoponax (1877)
- Royal amour (1884)
- Au premier hussard (1883)
- Le royaume d'Hercule (1896)
- Au chat qui pelote (1897)
- Dans la plume (1898)

His three-act operettas are:

- La timbale d'argent (1872)
- La petite reine (1873)
- Le roi d'Yvetot (1873)
- La famille Trouillat ou La rosière d'Honfleur (1874)
- La blanchisseuse de Berg-op-Zoom (1875)
- La cruche cassée (1875)
- La Sorrentine (1876)
- Le droit du seigneur (1878)
- Le billet de logement (1879)
- Le petit Parisien (1882)
- Le mariage au tambour (1886)
- Madame Cartouche (1886)
- Ninon de Lenclos (1887)
- Mam'zelle Crénom (1888)
- Le voyage de Suzette (1889)
- La famille Vénus (1891)
- Le pays de l'or (1892)
- La souris blanche (1897)

Other stage works, including ballet-pantomimes are:

- Les parisiennes (1874)
- Le prince soleil (1889)
- La prétentaine (1893)
- La brasserie (1886)
- Le commandant Laripète (1892)

Vasseur's church works include, L'Office divin (a collection of masses, offertories, antiphons, etc.); Hymne à Ste Cécile, for soprano, organ and orchestra; 2 masses; Magnificat.
