= Edmond Gondinet =

French playwright and librettist

Edmond Gaudinet
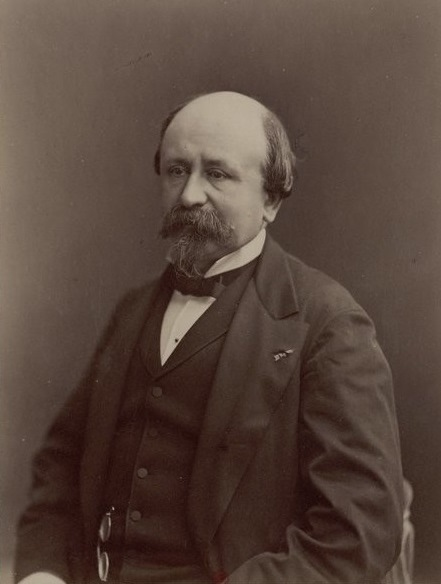
- Edmond Gondinet (atelier Nadar)
- Born: 7 March 1828; Laurière
- Died: 19 November 1888 (aged 60); Neuilly-sur-Seine
- Occupations: Playwright, librettist

Edmond Gondinet (born 7 March 1828 in Laurière, Haute-Vienne, France) was a French playwright and librettist. This author, nearly forgotten today, produced forty plays of which several were successful. He collaborated with Alphonse Daudet and Eugène Labiche, among others.

He was a writer, known for True Romance (1993) and Un viaggio di piacere (1922).

He died on 19 November 1888 in Neuilly, France.

== Plays ==
- Trop curieux (1863), comedy in one act performed for the first time in Paris at the Comédie Française on June 25, 1863. (Calmann Lévy, publisher)
- Les Victimes de l'argent (1865), comedy in three acts, performed for the first time in Paris in the Théâtre du Gymnase on June 15, 1865. (Calmann Lévy, publisher)
- Les Révoltées (1865), three-act comedy in verse, performed for the first time in Paris in Théâtre du Gymnase on November 30, 1865 (Théâtre Complet III-2)
- La Cravate blanche (1867), one-act comedy in free verse, performed for the first time in Paris in the Théâtre du Gymnase on July 23, 1867 (Théâtre Complet I-3)
- Le Comte Jacques (1868), three-act comedy, performed for the first time in Paris in the Théâtre du Gymnase on January 25, 1868 (Calmann Lévy, publisher)
- Les Grandes Demoiselles (1868), one-act comedy, performed for the first time in Paris in the Théâtre du Gymnase on March 10, 1868 (Théâtre Complet II-2)
- Gavaud, Minard et Cie (1869), three-act comedy, performed for the first time in Paris in the Théâtre du Palais-Royal on April 17, 1869 (Théâtre Complet I-1)
- Le Plus Heureux des Trois (1870), three-act comedy, in collaboration with Eugène Labiche, performed for the first time in Paris in the Théâtre du Palais-Royal on January 11, 1870 (Théâtre Complet III-1)
- Fin courant (1870), in collaboration with Albert Wolff.
- Christiane (1871), four-act comedy, performed for the first time in Paris in the Théâtre Français on December 20, 1871 (Théâtre Complet I-2)
- Paris chez lui (1872), three-act comedy, performed for the first time in Paris in the Théâtre du Gymnase on March 12, 1872 (Calmann Lévy, publisher).
- Panazol (1873), one-act comedy in verse, performed for the first time in Paris in the Théâtre du Vaudeville on June 10, 1873 (Calmann Lévy, publisher).
- Le Chef de division (1873), three-act comedy, performed for the first time in Paris in the Théâtre du Palais-Royal on November 15, 1873 (Théâtre Complet IV-2)
- Libres ! (1873), drama in five acts and eight scenes, performed for the first time in Paris in the Théâtre de la Porte-Saint-Martin on November 22, 1873 (Théâtre Complet V-2)
- Gilberte (1874), four-act comedy, performed for the first time in Paris in the Théâtre du Gymnase on September 19, 1874, in collaboration with Raymond Deslandes (Calmann Lévy, publisher).
- Le Homard (1874), Vaudeville in one act, Bethléem, p. 470 (I), performed for the first time in Paris in the Théâtre du Palais-Royal on April 2, 1874 (Théâtre Complet IV-1)
- Le Panache (1875), satire of government employees, three-act comedy, performed for the first time in Paris in the Théâtre du Palais-Royal on October 12, 1875 (Théâtre Complet II-1)
- Le Pélican Bleu (1876), one-act comedy, performed for the first time in Paris in the Théâtre des Variétés on February 4, 1876. This play is only a setting from Le Chef de division. It was intended to be used as a curtain raiser, and was never printed.
- Professeur pour dames (1877), one-act comedy, performed for the first time in Paris in the Théâtre des Variétés on April 4, 1877. This play was never printed.
- Le Tunnel (1877), one-act comedy, performed for the first time in Paris in the Théâtre du Palais-Royal on March 16, 1877 (Théâtre Complet II-4)
- Les Convictions de papa (1877), one-act comedy, Bethléem, p. 453 (III), performed for the first time in Paris in the Théâtre du Palais-Royal on April 13, 1877 (Théâtre Complet III-4)
- Le Club (1877), three-act comedy, performed for the first time in Paris in the Théâtre du Vaudeville on November 22, 1877 in collaboration with Félix Cohen (Théâtre Complet III-3)
- La Belle Madame Donis (1877), four-act comedy, performed for the first time in Paris in the Théâtre du Gymnase on December 29, 1877, in collaboration with Hector Malot, from whose novel the play was adapted (Calmann Lévy, publisher).
- Les Vieilles Couches (1878), three-act comedy, performed for the first time in Paris in the Théâtre du Palais-Royal on March 20, 1878 (Calmann Lévy, publisher).
- Les Cascades (1878), one-act comedy, performed for the first time in Paris in the Théâtre du Gymnase on November 18, 1878 (Calmann Lévy, publisher).
- Tant plus ça change (1878), three-act vaudeville-revue, performed for the first time in Paris in the Théâtre du Palais-Royal on December 28, 1878 (Calmann Lévy, publisher), in collaboration with Pierre Véron
- Les Tapageurs (1879), three-act comedy, performed for the first time in Paris in the Théâtre du Vaudeville on April 19, 1879 (Théâtre Complet V-3)
- Jonathan (1879), three-act comedy, performed for the first time in Paris in the Théâtre du Gymnase on September 27, 1879, in collaboration with François Oswald and Pierre Giffard (Théâtre Complet II-3)
- Le Nabab (1880), five-act comedy, performed for the first time in Paris in the Théâtre du Vaudeville on January 30, 1880, in collaboration with Alphonse Daudet et Pierre Elzéar. Though published (Calmann-Lévy, publisher), this play is not signed by Edmond Gondinet.
- Les Grands Enfants (1880), three-act comedy, performed for the first time in Paris in the Théâtre du Vaudeville on October 7, 1880 in collaboration with Paul de Nargaliers (Théâtre Complet IV-3)
- Les Braves gens (1880), four-act comedy, performed for the first time in Paris in the Théâtre du Gymnase on December 3, 1880 in collaboration with Pierre Wolff (Calmann-Lévy, publisher)
- L'alouette (1881), one-act comedy, performed for the first time in Paris in the Théâtre du Gymnase-Dramatique on February 14, 1881, in collaboration with Albert Wolff (Théâtre Complet IV-4)
- Un Voyage d'agrément (1881), three-act comedy, performed for the first time in Paris in the Théâtre du Vaudeville on June 3, 1881, in collaboration with Alexandre Bisson (Théâtre Complet V-1)
- Une Soirée parisienne (1881), three-act fantasy, performed for the first time in Paris in the Théâtre des Variétés on November 9, 1881, in collaboration with Ernest Blum. This play was never printed.
- Le Volcan (1882), three-act comedy, performed for the first time in Paris in the Théâtre du Palais-Royal on March 25, 1882, in collaboration with François Oswald and Pierre Giffard. This play was never printed.
- Tête de linotte (1882), three-act comedy, performed for the first time in Paris in the Théâtre du Vaudeville on September 11, 1882, in collaboration with Théodore Barrière (Théâtre Complet I-4)
- Peau Neuve (1883), three-act comedy, performed for the first time in Paris in the Théâtre du Palais-Royal on March 6, 1883, in collaboration with Debrit. This play was never printed.
- Les Affolés (1883), four-act comedy, performed for the first time in Paris in the Théâtre du Vaudeville October 8, 1883 in collaboration with Pierre Véron. (Calmann-Lévy, publisher),
- Clara Soleil (1885), three-act comedy, performed for the first time in Paris in the Théâtre du Vaudeville on February 6, 1885, in collaboration with Pierre Sivrac (Théâtre Complet VI-2)
- Le Baron de Carabasse (1885), three-act comedy, performed for the first time in Paris in the Théâtre du Palais-Royal on December 10, 1885, in collaboration with Émile Bergerat. This play was never printed.
- Le Parisien (1886), three-act comedy, performed for the first time in Paris in the Théâtre Français on January 23, 1885 (Théâtre Complet VI-1)
- Dégommé (1887), three-act comedy, performed for the first time in Paris in the Théâtre du Gymnase on September 30, 1887. This play was never printed.

== Librettos ==
- Le roi l’a dit (1873), comic opera, performed for the first time in Paris in the Opéra-Comique on May 24, 1873, with another run beginning in the same theater on June 3, 1885, with music by Léo Delibes (Théâtre Complet V-1)
- Le Dada (1876), three-act vaudeville, performed for the first time in Paris sur le Théâtre des Variétés on February 18, 1876, in musical collaboration with Jules Costé. This play was never printed.
- Le Grand Casimir (1879), three-act, performed for the first time in Paris in the Théâtre des Variétés on January 11, 1879, in collaboration with Jules Prével and Albert de Saint-Albin (libretto), and Charles Lecocq (music). Though published (Calmann-Lévy, publisher), this play is not signed by Edmond Gondinet.
- Les Voltigeurs de la 32ème (1880), three-act comic opera, performed for the first time in Paris in the Théâtre de la Renaissance on January 7, 1880. In collaboration with Georges Duval (libretto), and Robert Planquette (music) (Calmann-Lévy, publisher)
- Jean de Nivelle (1880), three-act opera, performed for the first time in Paris in the Opéra-Comique on March 8, 1880. In collaboration with Philippe Gille (libretto) and Léo Delibes (music) (Calmann-Lévy, publisher)
- Lakmé (1883), three-act opera, performed for the first time in Paris in the Opéra-Comique on April 14, 1883. In collaboration with Philippe Gille (libretto), Léo Delibes (music) (Calmann-Lévy, publisher)
- Mam’zelle Gavroche (1885), three-act operetta, performed for the first time in Paris in the Théâtre des Variétés on January 24, 1885, in collaboration with Ernest Blum et Albert de Saint-Albin (libretto), Florimond Ronger alias Hervé (music). This libretto was never printed.

== Ballet scenario ==
- Viviane (1886), five-act ballet spectacular, performed for the first time in Paris in the Eden-Théâtre on October 28, 1886, in collaboration with Raoul Pugno (music). (Heugel, publisher)
