= Pierre Véron (writer) =

French writer, journalist, and librettist

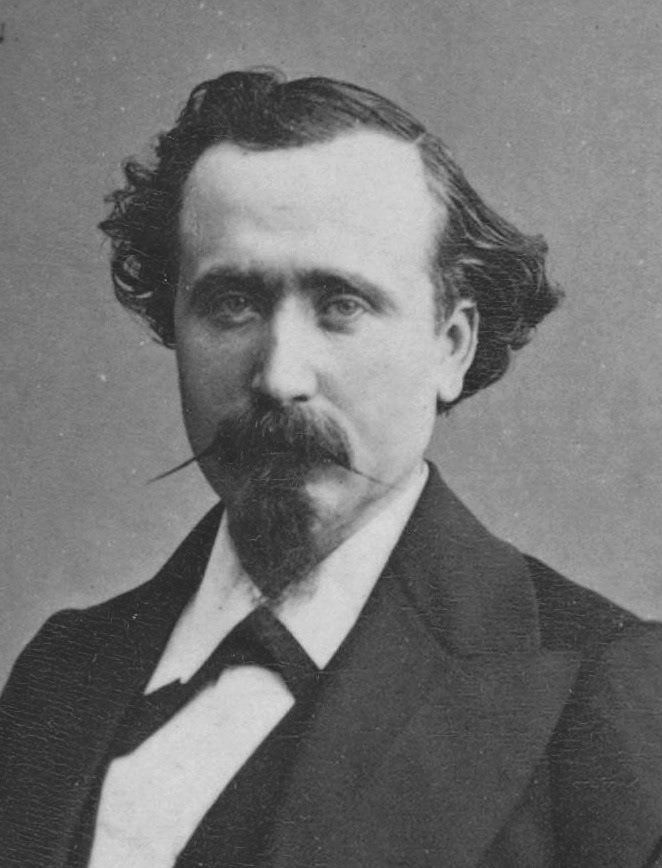
Pierre Véron; photograph by Nadar

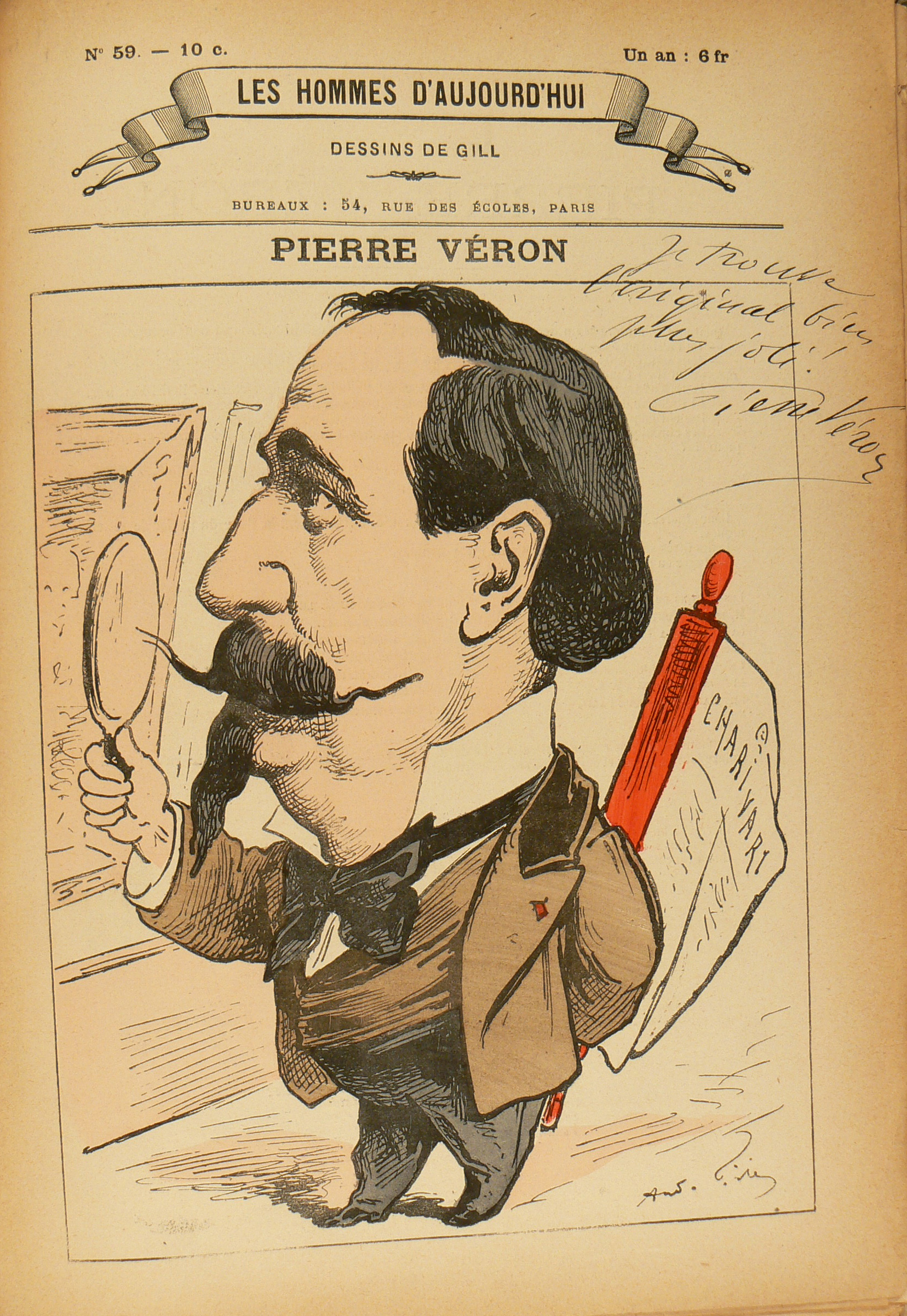
Caricature of Pierre Véron by André Gill with Véron's autographed comment: "I find the original much more handsome."

Pierre Véron (19 April 1831, Paris - 3 November 1900, Paris) was a French writer, journalist, and librettist.

== Life ==
In 1854 he published his first book, a volume of verse, and went on to write for and edit many prominent journals of the day. In the latter part of the 19th century he served as the editor-in-chief of both Le Charivari and Journal Amusant. He was the author of numerous fiction and non-fiction books chronicling and often satirizing the social mores of Parisian life. For many years his rooms in the Rue de Rivoli were the gathering place of French literary, artistic and political figures.

Véron had a keen interest in the theatre, both as a critic and as a playwright. He was the librettist for three works by Robert Planquette and was the co-author (with Edmond Gondinet) of several plays, including Les Affolés, a four-act comedy which premiered at the Théâtre du Vaudeville in 1883.

Véron died in Paris, the city of his birth, at the age of 67. He is buried in Montparnasse Cemetery in a grave marked with a bronze portrait bust by Jean Gautherin.

== Selected works ==
Librettos

- On demande une femme de chambre, operetta in one act, composed by Robert Planquette (1876)
- La confession de Rosette, operetta in one act, composed by Robert Planquette (1876)
- Le chevalier Gaston, opéra-comique in one act, composed by Robert Planquette (1879)

Plays

- Tant plus ça change, revue in 3 acts, co-written with Edmond Gondinet (1878)
- Les Affolés, comedy in 4 acts, co-written with Edmond Gondinet (1883)
