= Albert de Saint-Albin =

French playwright, journalist, chansonnier and librettist

Albert de Saint-Albin (1843, in Paris – 18 December 1901, in Paris) was a 19th-century French playwright, journalist, chansonnier and librettist.

== Biography ==
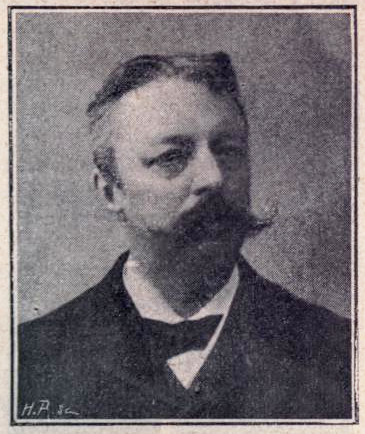
Albert de Saint Albin

A journalist at Le Temps, chief editor of the Jockey (1866) and Le Figaro (1880), he was known as a sports columnist under the pseudonym Robert Milton and was a great promoter of fencing.

His plays were presented on the most important Parisian stages of the 19th century, including the Théâtre des Variétés, the Théâtre du Palais-Royal, the Théâtre du Vaudeville, and the Théâtre de la Gaîté.

Moreover, Saint-Albin was a collector of paintings by Eugène Boudin of which he owned a dozen works and by Gustave Moreau.

== Works ==
=== Theatre ===
- 1875: Le Manoir de Pictordu, comédie-opérette in 3 acts, with Arnold Mortier
- 1876: La Belle Poule, three-act opéra bouffe, with Hector Crémieux
- 1877: La Foire Saint-Laurent, three-act opéra bouffe, with Crémieux and Jacques Offenbach
- 1879: Le Grand Casimir, three-act opérette, with Jules Prével and Charles Lecocq
- 1884: Le Train de plaisir, four-act comedy, with Alfred Hennequin and Mortier
- 1885: Mam'zelle Gavroche, comédie-opérette, with Edmond Gondinet
- 1885: Monsieur le Député, one-act comedy
- 1888: Les Joyeusetés de l'année
- 1891: Monsieur l'abbé ou la Belle-mère apprivoisée
- 1893: Leurs gigolettes
- 1895: Panurge, opéra comique, with Robert Planquette and Henri Meilhac
- 1906: Le Péril jaune, three-act comedy, with Alexandre Bisson, posth.

=== Sport ===
- 1875: Les Salles d'armes de Paris
- 1875: Le Sportman
- 1889: Les sports à Paris, 2 vol.
- 1889: Les cirques
- 1890: Les courses de chevaux en France, Hachette
- 1899: Les Courses de lévriers, le coursing, greyhounds et fox-terriers by Alfred de Sauvenière, preface
- undated: À travers les salles d'armes

=== Songs ===
- 1874: Le Langage des yeux !, with Prével et Lecocq
- 1874: Les Oiseaux en cage, with Auguste Coédès
- 1878: Pas de récompense. Plaintes d'une Parisienne, with Coédès
- 1885: Barcarolle d'Asnières
- 1894: L'Ascenseur !

== Bibliography ==
- Henri Avenel, La presse française au vingtième siècle, 1901, p. 435
- Manuel Gómez García, Diccionario Akal de Teatro, 1998, p. 745
- Jacques Marchand, Les défricheurs de la presse sportive, 1999, p. 98
- Kurt Gänzl, The encyclopedia of the musical theatre, 2001, p. 1778
