= Jules Duprato =

French composer (1827–1892)

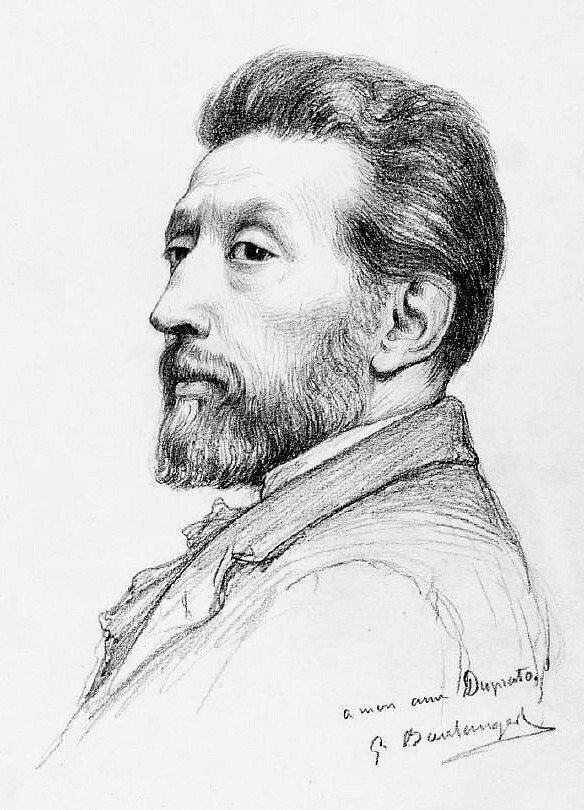
- Jules Duprato. Portrait by Gustave Boulanger
- Born: 20 August 1827; Nîmes
- Died: 20 May 1892 (aged 64); Paris
- Occupation: Composer

Jules Laurent Anacharsis Duprato (20 August 1827 – 20 May 1892) was a 19th-century French composer.

== Biography ==
A student of Aimé Leborne at the Conservatoire de Paris, he won first grand prix de Rome for musical composition in 1848.

After the success of his opéra comique Les Trovatelles, performed at Salle Favart in 1854 and his operetta M'sieu Landry, premiered at Théâtre des Bouffes-Parisiens in 1856, expectations were high for the young composer. His following works, however, including the operas La Déesse et le Berger (1863), La Fiancée de Corinthe (1867), and Le Cerisier (1874), rapidly fell into obscurity.

He was appointed a professor of harmony at the conservatory in 1871. He published several arrangements of La Marseillaise, wrote music for male chorus and one symphony. His pupils included Robert Planquette, Georges Douay, and Antoine Simon.

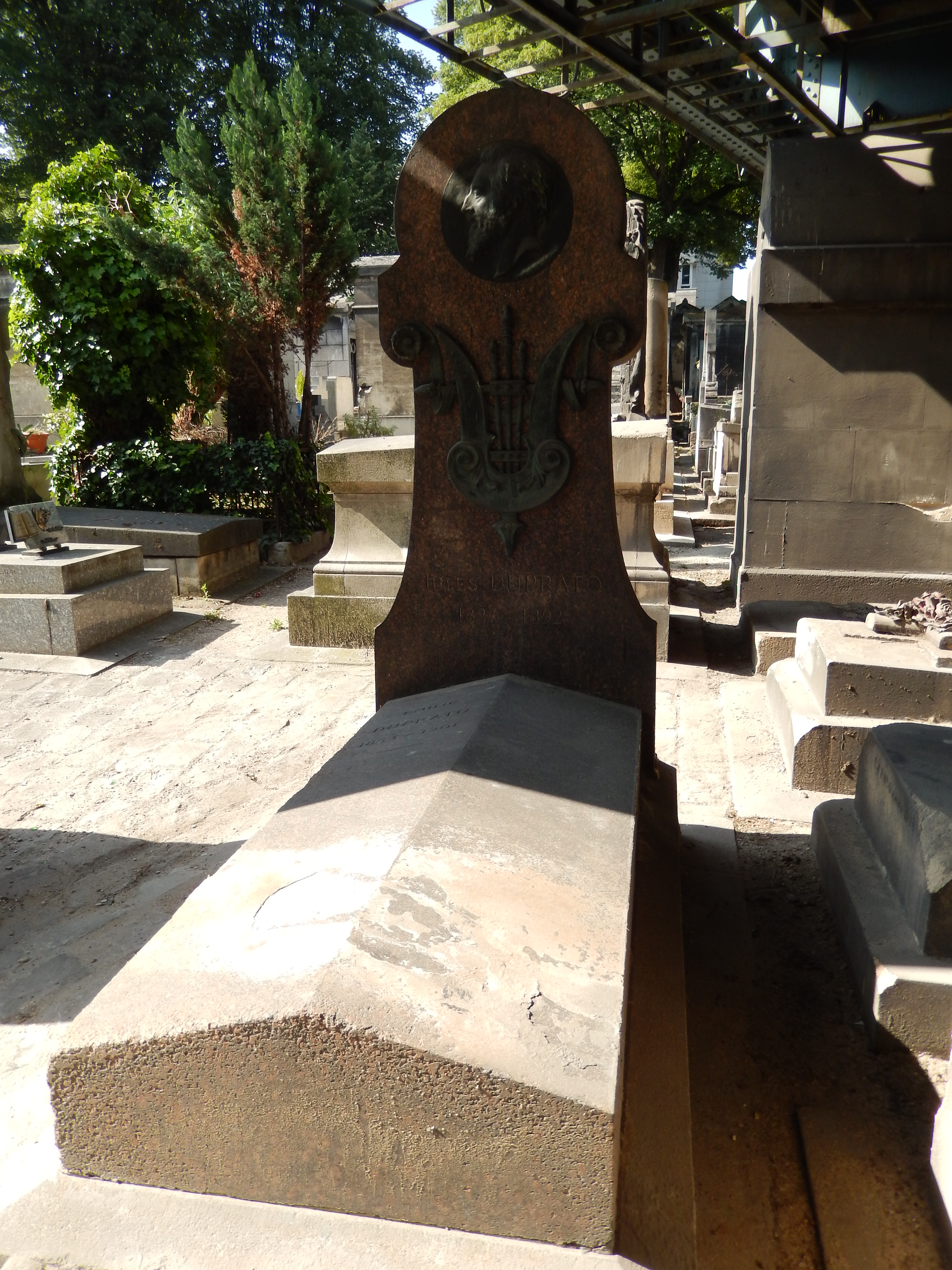
Duprato's grave site

His grave at Montmartre Cemetery is decorated with a medallion by sculptor Gabriel Thomas.

He was made chevalier of the Légion d'honneur in 1886.

== Bibliography ==
- Clauzel, Paul (1895). "Jules Duprato, compositeur. Notice biographique", Mémoires de l'Académie de Nîmes, vol. 17, pp. 191–237. Nîmes: Clavel et Chastanier.
- Pierre, Constant, editor (1900). Le Conservatoire national de musique et de déclamation. Documents historiques et administratifs. Paris: Imprimerie National. Read online at Google Books.
- Pougin, Arthur (1878). "Duprato (Jules-Laurent-Anacharsis)", pp. 291–292, in Biographie universelle des musiciens et Bibliographie générale de la musique par F.-J. Fétis. Supplément et complément, vol. 1. Paris: Firmin-Didot. Read online at Google Books.
- Remy, Alfred (1919). Baker's Biographical Dictionary of Musicians. New York: G. Schirmer. Read online at Google Books.
- Wagstaff, John (1992). "Duprato, Jules Laurent (Anacharsis)", vol. 1, p. 1280, in The New Grove Dictionary of Opera, 4 volumes, edited by Stanley Sadie. London: Macmillan. ISBN 9781561592289. Also at Oxford Music Online (subscription required).
