= Olivier Métra =

French composer and conductor

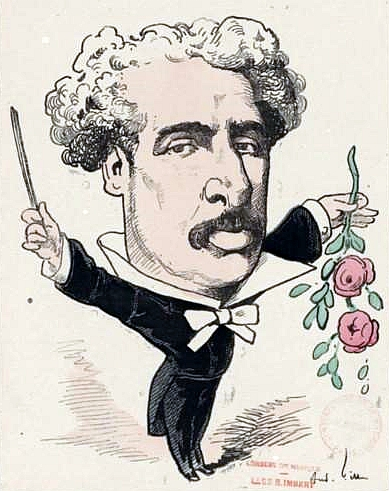
- Portrait charge by André Gill on a cover of Les Hommes d'aujourd'hui
- Born: 2 June 1830; Reims
- Died: 22 October 1889 (aged 59); Paris
- Occupations: Composer; Conductor

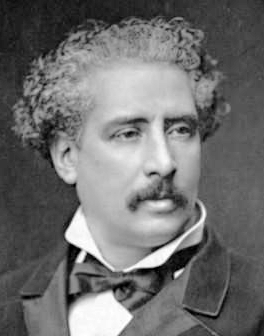
Portrait of Olivier Métra

Jules-Louis-Olivier Métra (2 June 1830 – 22 October 1889) was a French composer and conductor.

== Biography ==
The son of the actor Jean Baptiste Métra, Olivier Métra began his career at a very early age with his father. In 1842, he made his debut at the Théâtre Comte. In addition, he learned the violin and played from the age of 19 years in a ball of Boulevard de Rochechouart. On the advice of an orchestra musician, he followed the lessons of Antoine Elwart at the Conservatoire de Paris, where he obtained a first prize of harmony.

From 1855 he conducted the orchestra of the Bal Mabille. During this period he acquired great popularity thanks to waltzes such as Le Tour du Monde, la Valse des Roses, Gambrinus, and La Nuit La sérénade. From 1872 to 1877, he conducted the bals of the Opéra-Comique, the orchestra of the Folies Bergère for which he composed several ballets, including Les Volontaires. From 1874 to 1876, he directed the bals of the Théâtre de la Monnaie in Brussels and, finally, the bals de l'Opéra de Paris along with Johann Strauss II. In 1879, he gave the ballet Yedda, on a choreography by Mérante, premiered 17 January 1879. In 1885, he established at Palais Vivienne the "soirées Metra" which consisted of promenade concerts, dances and parties on Wednesday and Saturday evenings. In 1888, he created at the Théâtre des Bouffes-Parisiens his operetta Le Mariage avant la lettre on a libretto by Adolphe Jaime and Georges Duval. In addition to his waltzes and operettas, Métra made numerous arrangements of other operettas by composers such as Jacques Offenbach, Émile Tédesco, Louis Ganne, Robert Planquette, Charles Lecocq, Edmond Audran and Léon Vasseur. Some of his compositions are used as film music in, among others, Ciboulette, by Claude Autant-Lara (1930) and Sentimental Destinies by Olivier Assayas (2000).

He was well known for his waltzes, polkas, mazurkas and quadrilles.

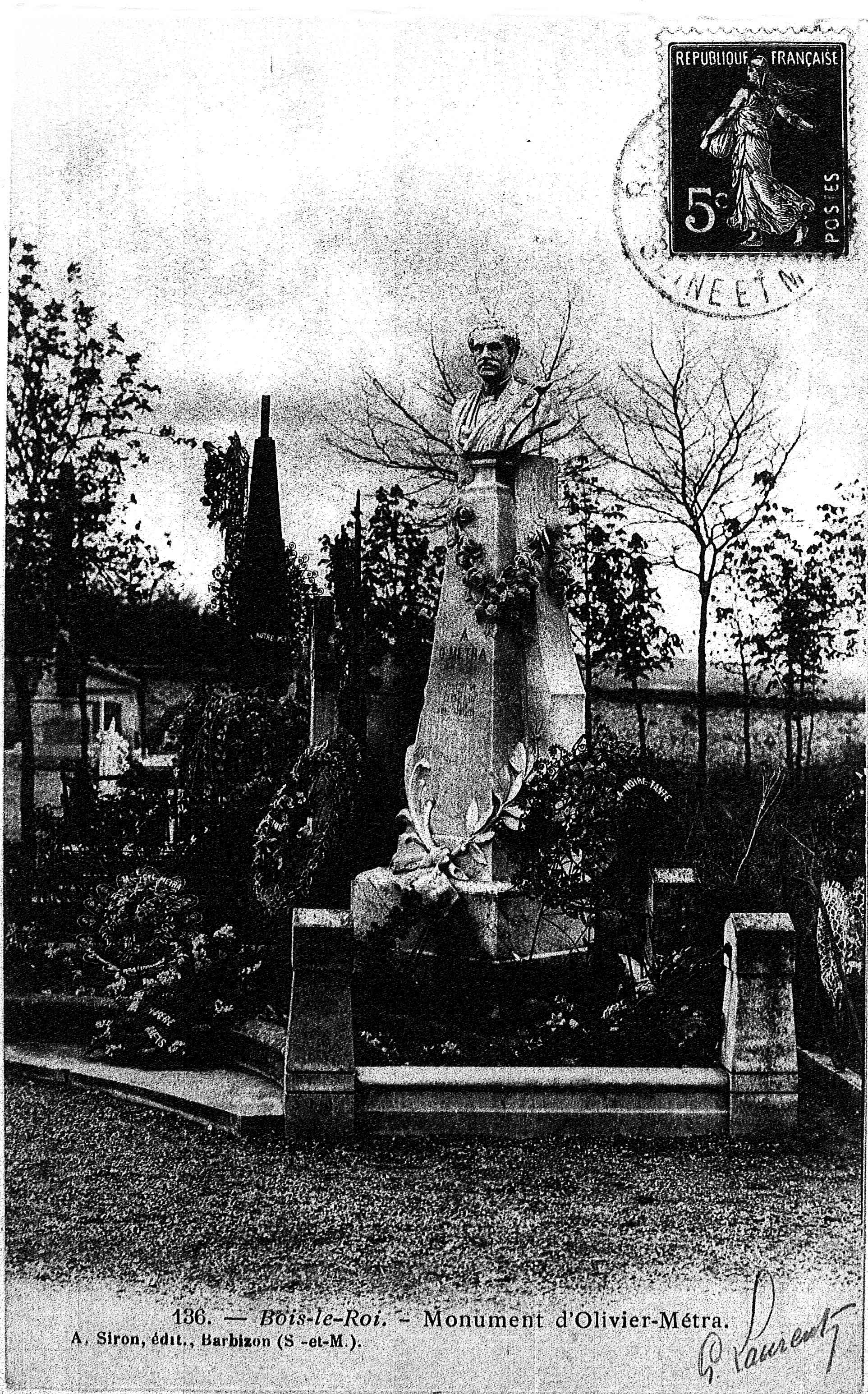
Monument at Bois-le-roi.

Olivier Métra is buried at Bois-le-Roi, his monumental tomb is adorned with a bust by Antonin Mercié.

Marcel Proust alludes to Valse des roses by Olivier Métra in Swann's way.

== Sources ==
- La vie rémoise
