= Annibale Bizzelli =

Italian composer

Annibale Bizzelli (23 April 1900, in Arezzo – 12 July 1967, in Rome) was an Italian composer.

== Selected filmography ==
- Men of the Mountain (1943)
- The Lovers of Ravello (1951)
