= Le docteur Ox =

Opéra bouffe by Jacques Offenbach

Jacques Offenbach by Nadar, c. 1860s

Le docteur Ox is an opéra bouffe in three acts and six tableaux of 1877 with music by Jacques Offenbach. The French libretto was by Arnold Mortier and Philippe Gille, adapted from the 1872 short story Une fantaisie du docteur Ox by Jules Verne.

== Background ==
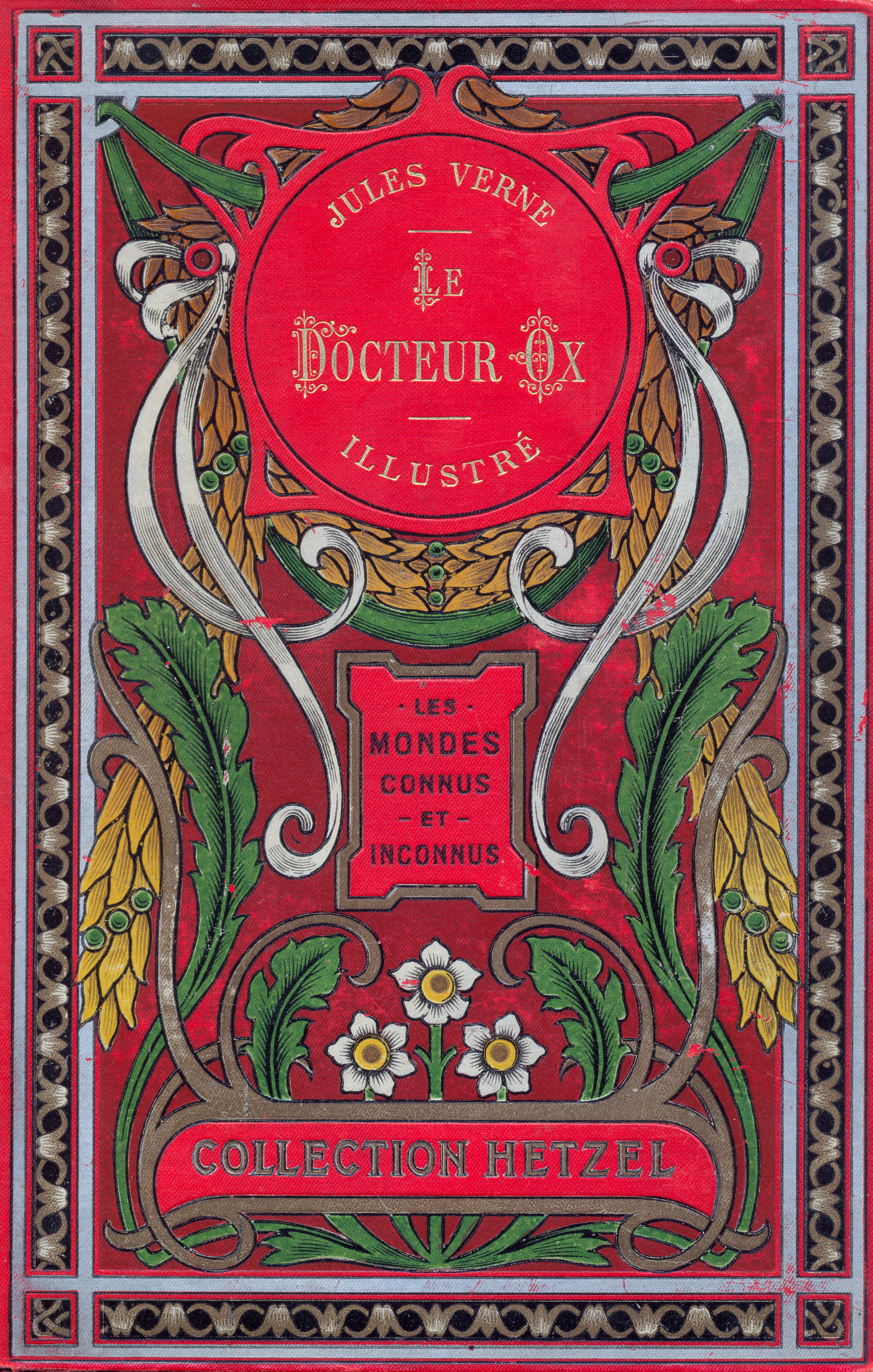
The cover of an edition Jules Verne's story

Offenbach had already set a libretto based closely on a work by Verne with the opéra féerie Le voyage dans la lune in 1875. Verne had been a co-librettist for several operas presented at the Théâtre Lyrique, as well as for Monsieur de Chimpanze for the Bouffes-Parisiens between 1853 and 1855. For Le Docteur Ox the novelist collaborated more closely with Offenbach and his librettists, and attended several of the later rehearsals at the Variétés. A first read-through took place on 18 November 1876 and during the course of rehearsals the number of scenes was increased from four to six.

In changes to Verne's original story, romance was introduced in the form of Prascovia, a fiancée for Ox, and the liaison between Suzel and Frantz. Offenbach demanded many special effects such as syphons prepared to make the sound of gas being released, bells and a brass band for the kermesse, which caused strained relations with Bertrand, the theatre director. The work is dedicated to "Anna Judic".

The work appeared at a difficult period for Offenbach after his return from America, which coincided in early 1877 with virulent attacks in the press, led by the senator Lucien Arbel, around the time of the production of Le docteur Ox.

== Performance history ==
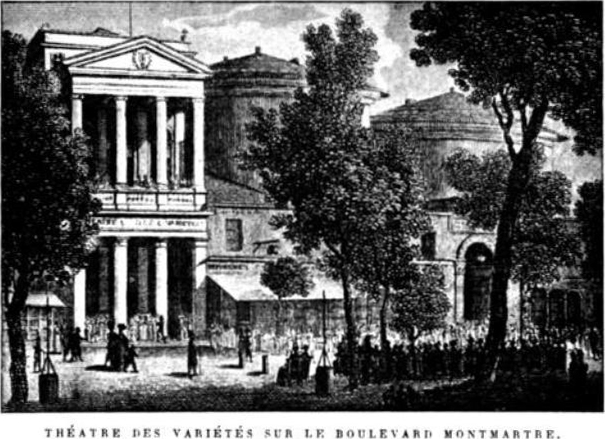
The Théâtre des Variétés ( c. 1820)

Le docteur Ox had 40 performances in its initial Paris run at the Théâtre des Variétés, but the piece faded after a brilliant start and was replaced by a revival of La Périchole. Judic, who was the definite star of the evening, was costumed for her entrance as in the 1870 painting Salomé by Henri Regnault.

An English language burlesque Oxygen, based on the Offenbach, was performed in both Britain and America in the late 19th century. A revised version of Le docteur Ox was performed in Cologne, premiered on 19 September 1978.

More recent revivals include a version with reduced orchestration at the Théâtre de l'Athénée in Paris in December 2003, conducted by Benjamin Levy, which was subsequently released on DVD, and a production at the Théâtre Benno Besson in Yverdon-les-Bains in Switzerland in September 2008.

== Roles ==
Role	Voice type	Premiere cast, 26 January 1877 (Conductor: Thibault)
Le Docteur Ox, a Danish inventor	tenor	José Dupuis
Van Tricasse	tenor	Étienne Pradeau
Ygène	tenor	Léonce
Prascovia	mezzo-soprano	Anna Judic
Mme Van Tricasse	mezzo	Aline Duval
Niklausse	baritone	Baron
Frantz, son of Josse	tenor	Cooper
Schahoura	baritone	Dailly
Josse	tenor	Alexandre Guyon
Koukouma	tenor	Emmanuel
Kasbech	bass	Daniel Bac
Mozdock	tenor	Hamburger
Ararat	tenor	Germain
Le Grand Personnage		Bourdeille
Lotché	soprano	Angèle
Suzel	soprano	Baumaine
Alda	soprano	Stella
Naya	soprano	de Vaure
Hilda	soprano	Esquirol
Chorus Neighbours, gypsies, workers, citizens of Quiquendonne

== Synopsis ==
=== Act 1 ===
The first tableau - the house of Van Tricasse, in Quiquendonne, Flanders

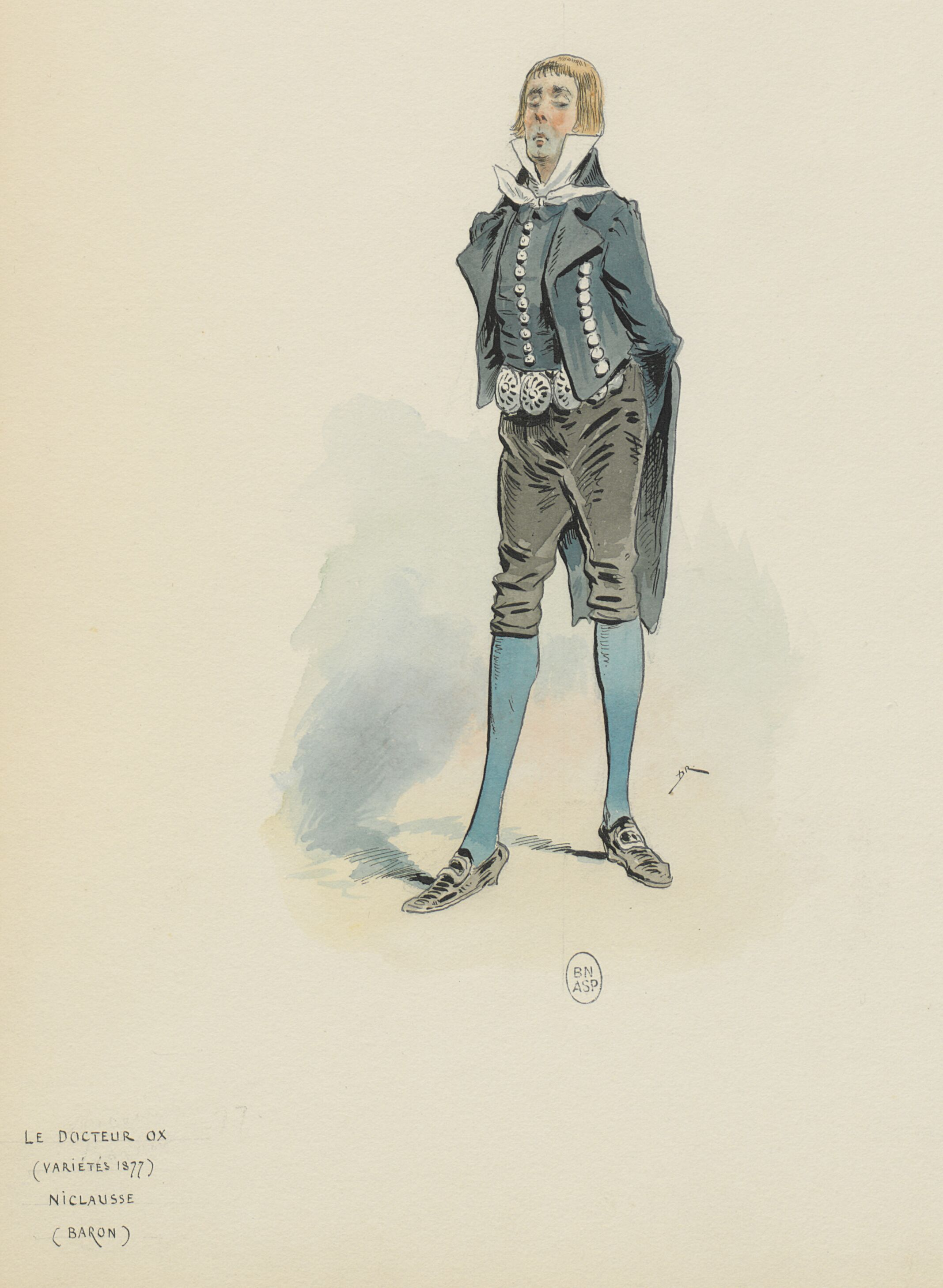
Baron as Nicklausse

The overture quotes the « Marche Bohémienne ». Monsieur van Tricasse is the mayor of Quiquendone, a peaceful town where things take ten times longer to happen than normal. Dr Ox has noted that a lack of oxygen is causing this languor and denying the citizens of many other powerful virtues. He is now housed in a tower inventing a new gas which the Quiquendonniens believe will bring fame to their town but which he hopes will enliven and invigorate the people via a vast lighting system. The servant Lotché, from the Midi, is unaffected by the general languor, and teases Frantz, in love with the Tricasses's daughter Suzel, who has been pledged to the Dr Ox for a wedding three years hence. Van Tricasse, Niklausse and Josse reflect on town business and the oxy-hydrique gas, which will be introduced by Ox to illuminate the town. Today they will visit his laboratory, along with a visiting dignitary from the next town, Virgamen. A waltz leads to the arrival of Prascovia, a princess and Schahoura, dressed as gypsies, who want permits to stay in Quiquendone for the festival. As they all leave to go to the mayor's office, Docteur Ox and his assistant Ygène enter to collect the regulator key, which will allow them to start production at the factory in Quiquendone. Ox is horrified when he sees Prascovia: they were engaged, but on the wedding day he ran off.

Second tableau : Ox’s laboratory.
Ox and Ygène enter to prepare the public experiment. Prascovia, Schahoura and the gypsies arrive, intent on revenge, and Prascovia swears that she will have Dr Ox even though he fled their wedding. Prascovia and Schahoura confront Ox but he puts them off until the day after tomorrow – by which time he hopes they will be expelled from the city. The official visit commences. The Quiquendoniens request to see Ox's gas. Light and gas make everyone behave in a more lively way. Monsieur van Tricasse is attracted to Lotché and Madame van Tricasse falls for Niklausse. Prascovia tries to denounce Ox as a second-hand Don Juan, but she is dismissed.

=== Act 2 ===
Third tableau : a street.
Disguised as traders plying their wares, the gypsies plot against Dr Ox. To prevent the marriage of Ox and Suzel, Schahoura plans to kidnap Ox and send him to the Caucasus. Ox serenades outside the window of Suzel, but is warned by Ygène that he will be recognised at the Kermesse that night, explaining that Prascovia will be in the crowd gathering for the evening's kermesse. Now Ox dons the costume of the important person as a disguise. Lotché complains about the new servant (Lisbeth) who has been taken on at the Van Tricasse house, who now appears: Prascovia. Ox enters, as the ‘Grand Personnage’, and is charmed by her; they sing a duet in flamand dialect. Prascovia tells the fake gypsies that Ox can be recognised by his disguise, but the real important person comes in and is immediately kidnapped by the plotters.

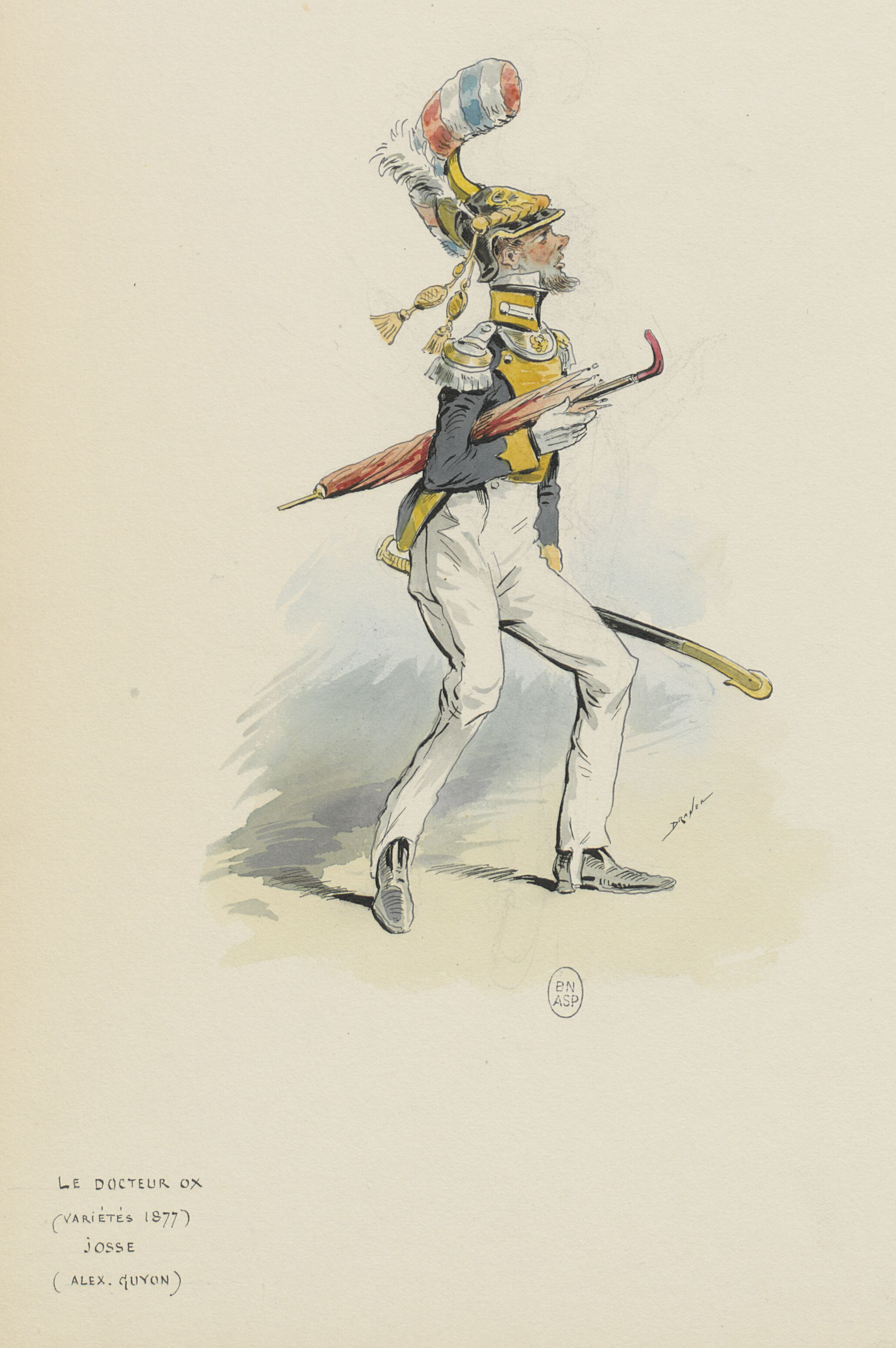
Guyon as Josse

Fourth tableau. The kermesse.
The people of Quiquendonne arrive to observe the demonstration by Docteur Ox. Prascovia now determines to get hold of the moderator key. Ox and Ygène start the demonstration and the finials are illuminated by the oxyhydric gas. The gas makes the people become animated and new couples come together: Suzel joins Ox, Niklausse gets close to Madame van Tricasse, Monsieur van Tricasse tries to seduce Loché, but she is taken with Schahoura. Ygène, falling for the charms of Prascovia, gives her the key of the moderator.

=== Act 3 ===
Fifth tableau – the upper floors of Quiquendone Tower.
From his tower observatory, Ox can witness all the effects of his gas, which has animated the town and aroused people's spirit. Prascovia comes to the tower and, like a siren, inveigles Ox down. At street level the doctor is under the influence of the gas, and he says he loves her, and, then reveals to her the password for the moderator « thesaurochrysonichochysidès ». As she already has the key, Prascovia can now take control of the laboratory.

Sixth tableau. The main square in Quiquendone.
Les Quiquendoniens are much agitated, as the town is now at war with the people of Virgamen. Ox tries to calm the situation, reminding the soldiers that they are good and peaceful bourgeois. The key to turn off the gas has been lost: Ygène had ceded it to Prascovia, who entrusted it to Schahoura who gave it to Lotché who threw it down a well. However, Ygène has brought together the hydrogen and oxygen lamps... all of a sudden there is a huge explosion at the laboratory. As things return to normal, everyone goes back to their old partners. Although Ox loses his experiment, he rejoins Prascovia, saying that everything that has been seen in Quiquendone, could happen somewhere else.
