= Lucille Tostée =

French opera singer

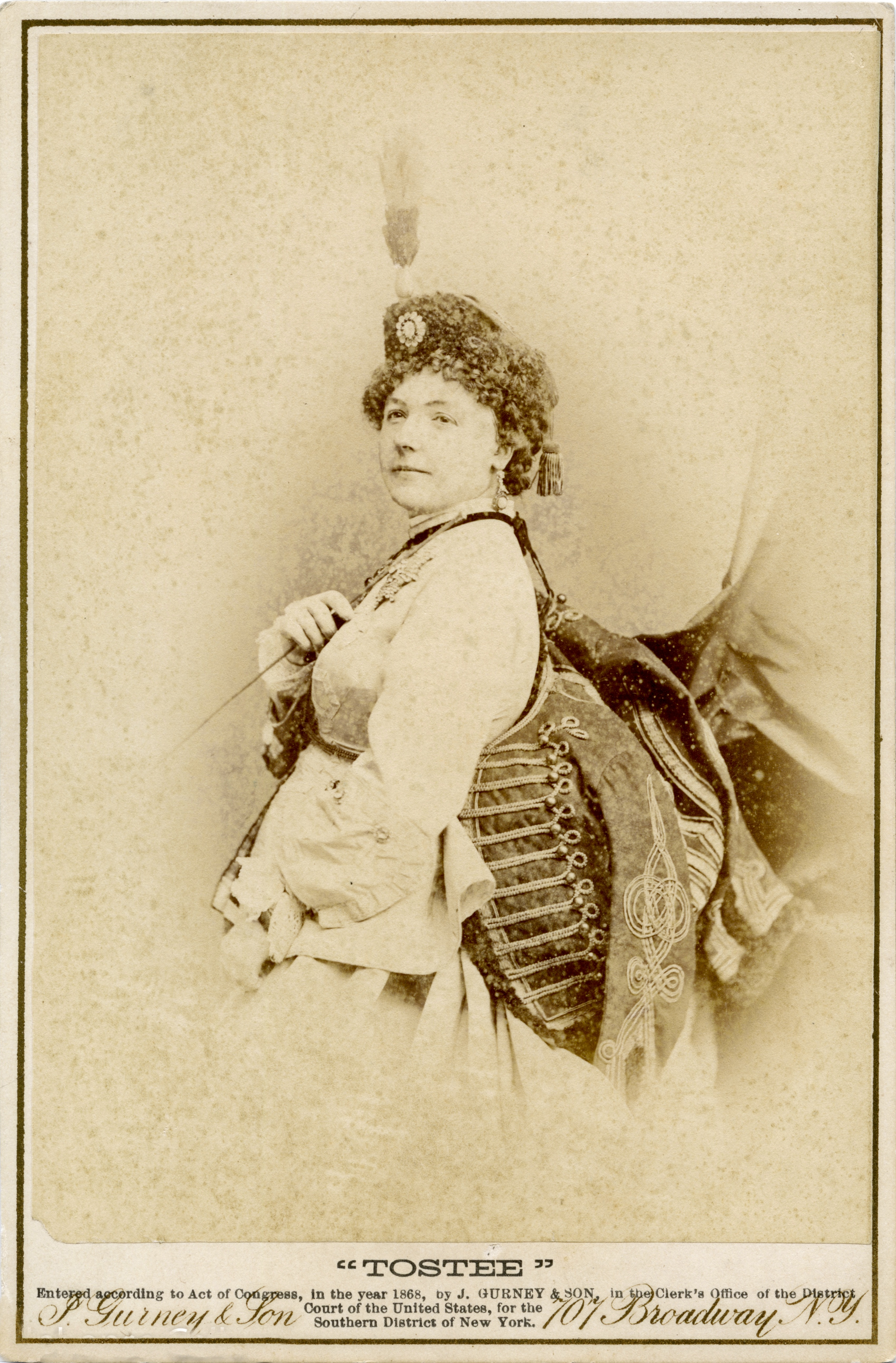
Lucille Tostee, French Soprano by J Gurney & Son photographists at 707 Broadway, NYC c. 1868

Lucille Tostée (1837- 1874) was a French soprano, associated with opéra-bouffe in Paris and the US in the mid-19th century, particularly in the works of Offenbach.

== Life and career ==
Tostée's first role at the Théâtre des Bouffes Parisiens was as Scipionne in Les vivandières de la grande-armée in 1859, swiftly followed by a revival of La rose de Saint-Flour, and she remained a star in the Paris opéra-bouffe from the early 1860s to her death.

She created roles in Offenbachs's Le pont des soupirs (Amoroso, 1861), Les bavards (Béatrix, 1862), and Il signor Fagotto (Fabricio, 1863). She toured with the Bouffes company to Vienna in 1861 and 1862, appearing at the Theater am Franz-Josefs-Kai.

In 1867 she travelled to New York to appear at the Théâtre Français, starring in Geneviève de Brabant, La belle Hélène, Lischen et Fritzchen and Orphée aux Enfers. Later the emergence of Zulma Bouffar diminished her opportunities.

Other creations included Gotte in the collaborative work Les musiciens de l’orchestre, Léonore in Le roman comique, and Théâtre-Bouffe in La tradition by Delibes.
