= Ba-ta-clan =

Operetta by Jacques Offenbach

- Operetta by Jacques Offenbach
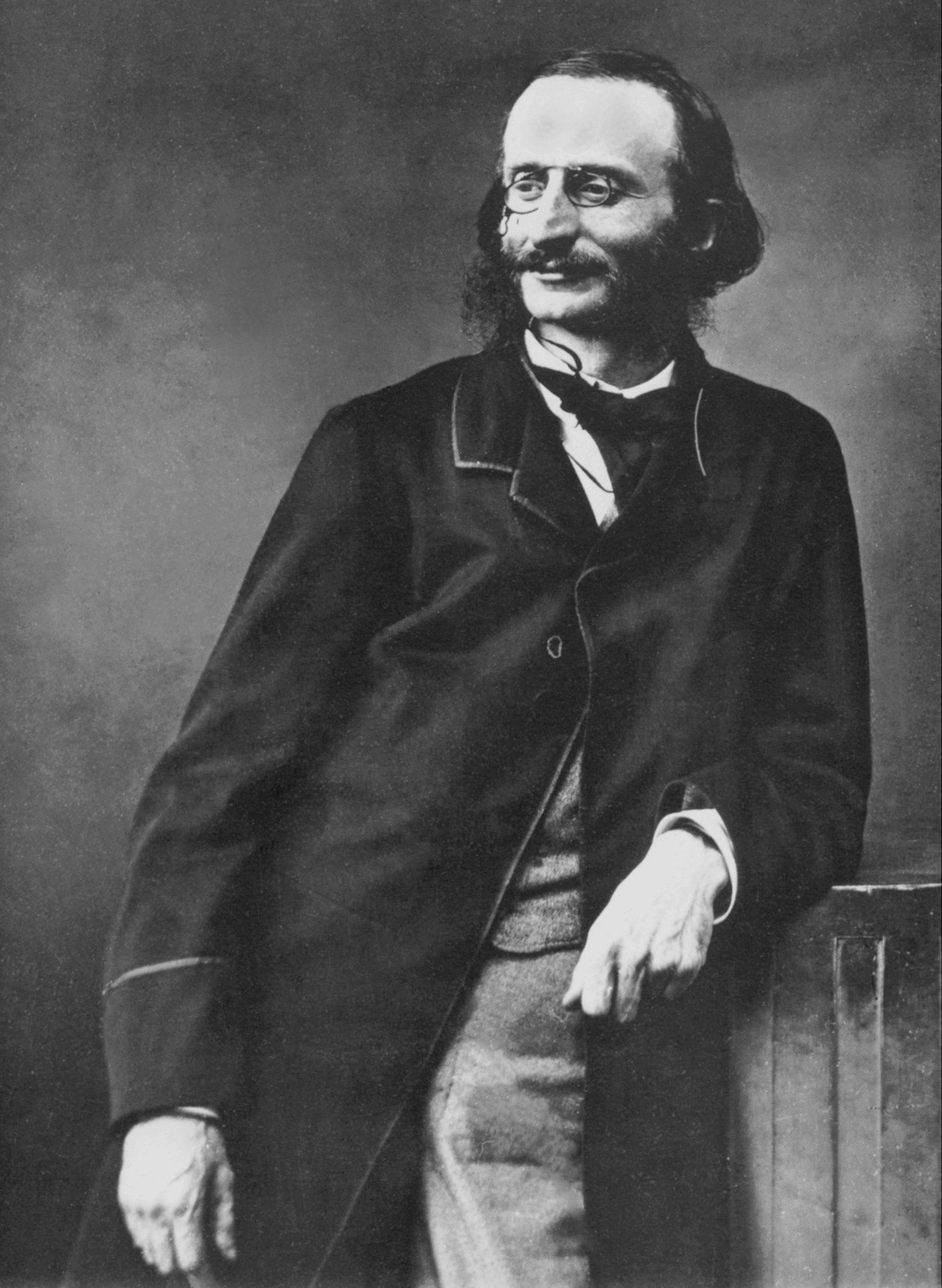
- Jacques Offenbach
- Librettist: Ludovic Halévy
- Language: French
- Premiere: 29 December 1855; Théâtre des Bouffes Parisiens

Ba-ta-clan is a "chinoiserie musicale" (or operetta) in one act with music by Jacques Offenbach to an original French libretto by Ludovic Halévy. It was first performed at the Théâtre des Bouffes Parisiens, Paris, on 29 December 1855. The operetta uses set numbers and spoken dialogue and runs for under an hour.

== Background ==
Ba-ta-clan was Offenbach's first big success, and opened his new winter theatre, the Salle Choiseul. The witty piece satirised everything from contemporary politics to grand opera conventions. It was frequently revived in Paris, London and New York for decades, and Offenbach eventually expanded it as a full-length piece with a cast of eleven. Offenbach's early operettas were small-scale one-act works, since the law in France limited the licence for musical theatre works (other than most operas) to one-act pieces with no more than three singers and, perhaps, some mute characters. In 1858, this law was changed, and Offenbach was able to offer full-length works, beginning with Orpheus in the Underworld.

In 1864, a music-hall called Bataclan opened in Paris, named after the operetta, and is still functioning today.

Ba-ta-clan was first performed in England on 20 May 1857 at St James's Theatre during Offenbach's second visit to London, arranged by his father-in-law John Mitchell, when the composer brought the Bouffes company including orchestra and offered 19 different pieces, 11 by him. In 1867 the work was produced on a triple bill at St George's Opera House in London (as Ching-Chow-Hi) alongside La Chatte métamorphosée en femme (as Puss in Petticoats) and the premiere of Sullivan's The Contrabandista.

While the historical butt of the satire, Napoléon III, has passed, the situation mocked is timeless, the emperor Fé-ni-han being able to represent any great ruler on earth. Three years after the coup that replaced the Republic with the Empire and as France celebrated a victory in Crimea, the fake Chinese poke fun at the chauvinism of the time; in Second French Empire France, everything is under state surveillance, little different from the imaginary China depicted on stage. Kracauer summed up the target of the piece as; "Power is a joke and court life mere mummery".

== Roles ==
| Role | Voice type | Premiere Cast, 29 December 1855 (Conductor: Jacques Offenbach) |
|---|---|---|
| Fé-an-nich-ton | soprano | Marie Dalmont |
| Ké-ki-ka-ko | tenor | Jean-François Berthelier |
| Ko-ko-ri-ko | baritone | Prosper Guyot |
| Fé-ni-han | tenor | Étienne Pradeau |
| First conspirator | tenor | |
| Second conspirator | tenor | |

== Synopsis ==
The action takes place in Ché-i-no-or, in the gardens of the palace of the Emperor Fè-ni-han, with kiosks and pagodas. Ko-ko-ri-ko, chief of the guard is the head of a conspiracy to dethrone the Emperor; the opera opens with the conspirators setting the scene in Chinese. They leave, and the princess Fé-an-nich-ton reads a book – La Laitière de Montfermeil by Paul de Kock; she notices that Ké-ki-ka-ko is leafing through a copy of La Patrie. They realize that each of them is not Chinese, but French. Ké-ki-ka-ko is the Viscount Alfred Cérisy, once shipwrecked on the coast of China and captured, tortured and brought to the palace and condemned to only repeat the rebels' song Ba-ta-clan. Fé-an-nich-ton confesses in song that she is Mademoiselle Virginie Durand, a light soprano who was on a Far East tour to initiate the locals into the great French repertoire: Les Huguenots and La Dame aux Camélias, La Juive and Les Rendez-vous bourgeois, Phèdre and Passé minuit, when she was captured by the soldiers of Fé-ni-han. The two Parisians reflect wistfully of home, and Fé-an-nich-ton sings the 'Ronde de Florette'. They both decide to run away, dancing as they go.

The conspirators return, but when alone, Fè-ni-han laments on his lot; he is actually Anastase Nourrisson, a native of Brive-la-Gaillarde and his only wish is to see France again. Ko-ko-ri-ko comes back threateningly and he and Fè-ni-han sing a duo in made-up Italian in the style of Bellini. In fact Fé-an-nich-ton and Ké-ki-ka-ko have been caught by Ko-ko-ri-ko while trying to flee, and the emperor has been asked for the death penalty, which he cannot refuse.

In their distress, Virginia and Alfred sing one last time La Ronde de Florette, and Fè-ni-han is amazed to hear them speaking French, likewise Fé-an-nich-ton and Ké-ki-ka-ko are surprised to hear the Emperor talking their language. Fè-ni-han dismisses the conspirators and explains how eight years previously he was dragged in front of the real prince Fè-ni-han and told that the only way he would avoid execution was by assuming the habits and role of emperor. He now makes the same offer to Ké-ki-ka-ko who naturally refuses, and asks why an insurrection is being plotted. Fè-ni-han, it seems, through not speaking Chinese had accidentally impaled the five most virtuous people in the land, and now faces a conspiracy against his rule. Ké-ki-ka-ko threatens to join the conspiracy so both summon the conspirators with the Ba-ta-clan anthem (mixed with the Chorale 'Ein feste Burg' from Les Huguenots). Finally, Fè-ni-han is handed a letter from the chief conspirator on a silver platter, revealing that he, Ko-ko-ri-ko, is also of French origin (born rue Mouffetard) and he is ready to provide the means for their escape in return for being allowed himself to become Emperor. All ends happily with a reprise of the Ba-ta-clan anthem, and Fé-an-nich-ton, Ké-ki-ka-ko and Fé-ni-han prepare to depart for France.

== Recordings ==
Jacques Offenbach: Ba-Ta-Clan, Orchestre Jean-François Paillard, Choir Philippe Caillard

- Conductor: Marcel Couraud
- Principal singers: Huguette Boulangeot (Fé-an-nich-ton), Raymond Amade (Ké-ki-ka-ko), Rémy Corazza (Fé-ni-han), René Terrasson (Ko-ko-ri-ko); a linking narration is read by Jean Desailly.
- Recording date: March 1966
- Label: Erato 063-19 989-2 (CD, with Les bavards)

Jacques Offenbach: Ba-Ta-Clan, L'Ensemble de Basse-Normandie

- Conductor: Dominique Debart
- Principal singers: Maryse Castets (Fé-an-nich-ton), Vincent Vittoz (Ké-ki-ka-ko), Bernard van der Meersch (Fé-ni-han), Michel Hubert (Ko-ko-ri-ko)
- Recording date: 1986
- Label: Pluriel PL 3374 (CD)

== See also ==
- Libretto in WikiSource
- Fisch-Ton-Kan by Emmanuel Chabrier, first performed in 1875.
- The Mikado by Arthur Sullivan, first performed in 1885.
- Bataclan
