= Fisch-Ton-Kan =

Opéra bouffe in one act by Emmanuel Chabrier

- Opéra bouffe by Emmanuel Chabrier
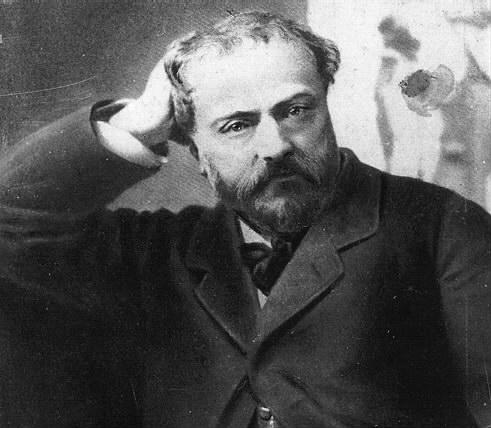
- The composer in 1882
- Librettist: Paul Verlaine
- Language: French
- Premiere: 31 March 1875 (with piano); Cercle de l'Union artistique, Paris

Fisch-Ton-Kan is an opéra bouffe in one act by Emmanuel Chabrier of which only some numbers survive. The French libretto was by Paul Verlaine, and probably Lucien Viotti, after the 'parade chinoise' Fich-Tong-Khan ou L'orphelin de le Tartarie of 1835 by Thomas Sauvage (1794-1877) and Gabriel de Lurieu (1792-1869).

The title is tongue-in-cheek, as Fisch-Ton-Kan is a phonetic rendition of French fiche ton camp, which may be translated as "clear off!".

== Background ==
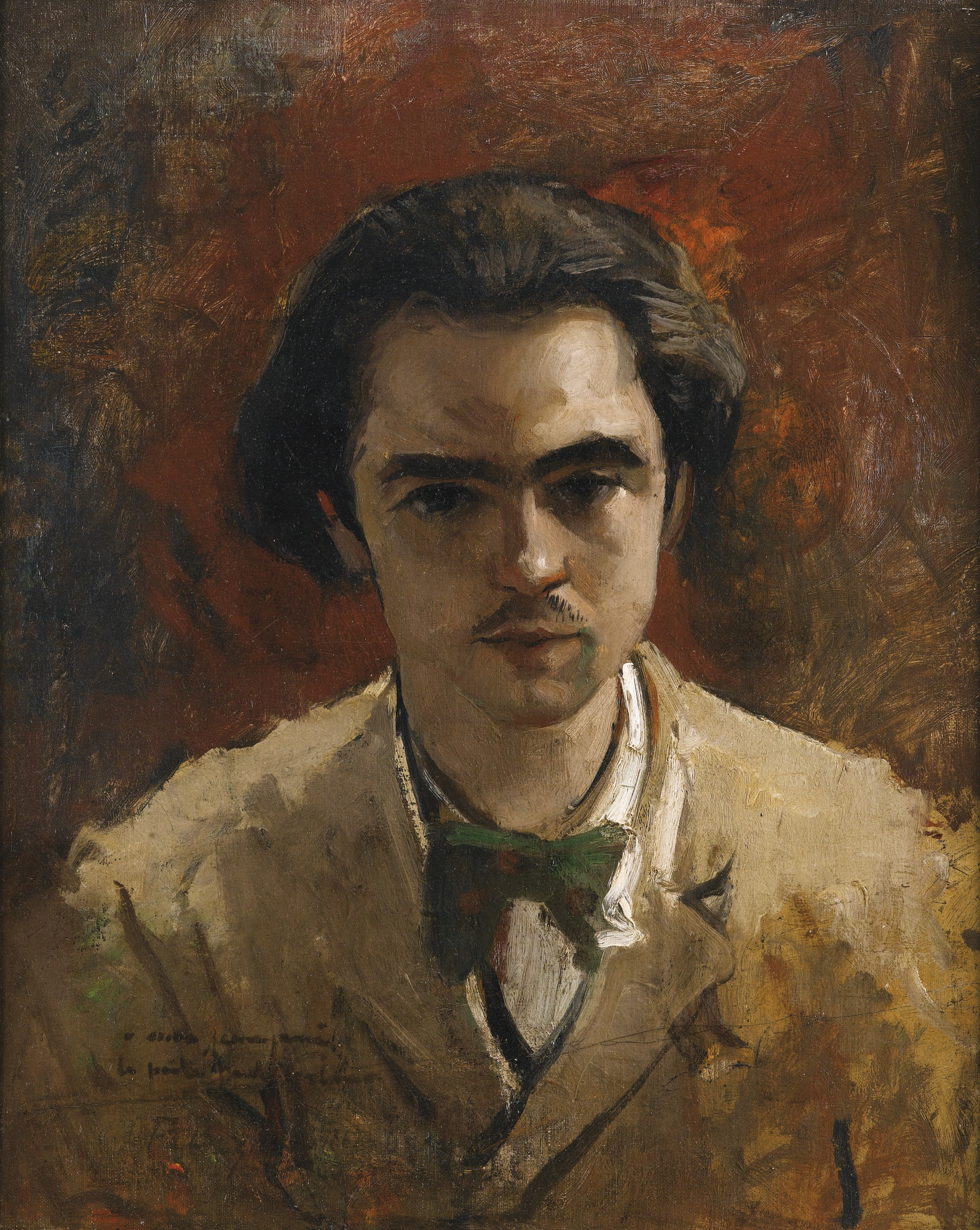
The young Paul Verlaine.

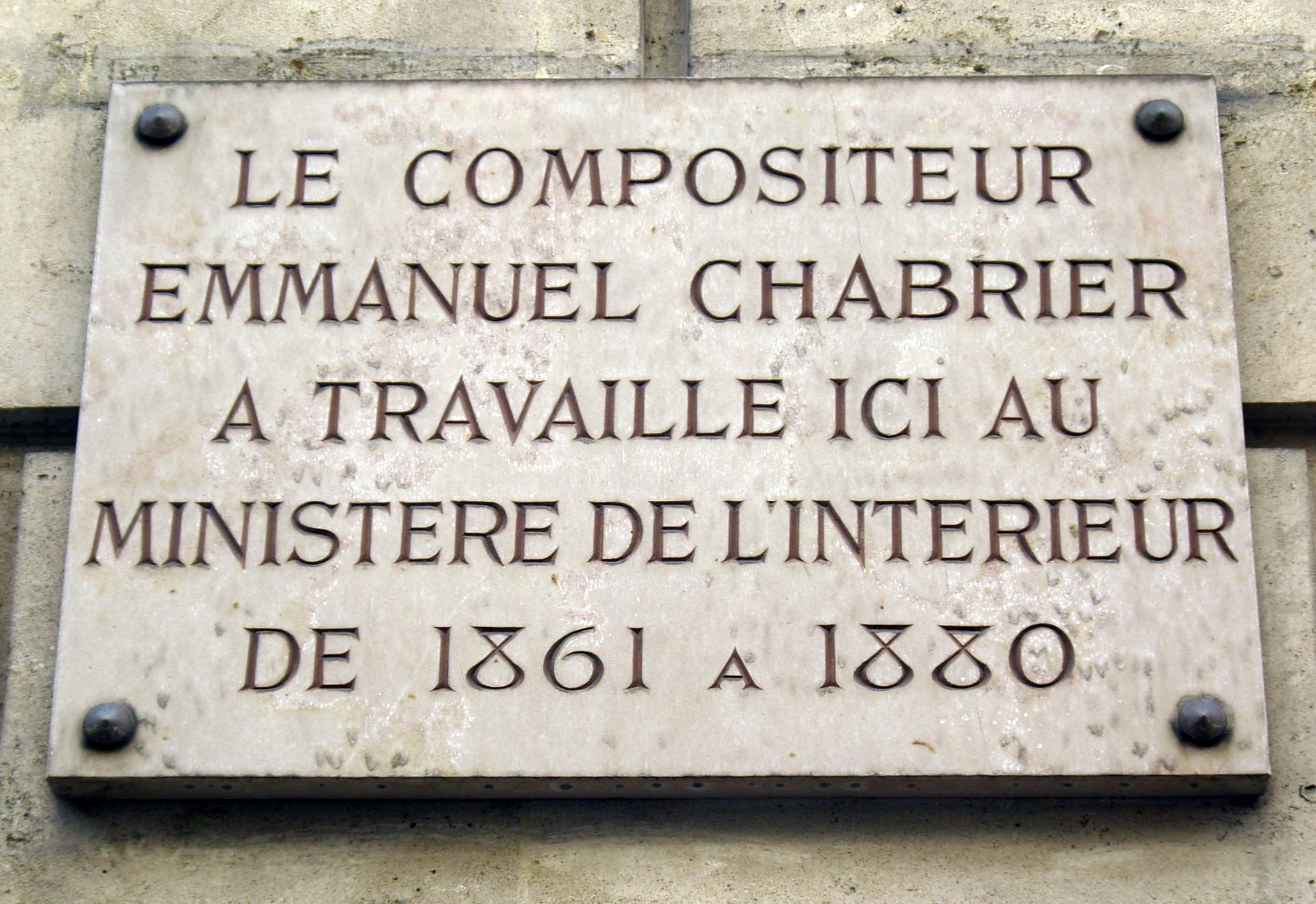
Plaque at the French Ministry of the Interior, where Chabrier was working when he composed Fisch-Ton-Kan.

Composed around 1864, when Verlaine and Chabrier, working as a civil servant, had become good friends, only five complete numbers survive from this early comic work. Many of the situations recur in Chabrier's opéra bouffe of 1877, L'étoile: Goulgouly becomes Laoula, Fisch-Ton-Kan turns into Lazuli and Kakao is a precursor of Ouf Ier. The 'Air de Poussah' was re-used by Chabrier in his Ronde Champêtre, a piano work of 1880. Manuscripts of Fisch-Ton-Kan in the Bibliothèque Nationale include an early version of the 'Couplets du Pal' from L'étoile.

Le Sire de Fisch-Ton-Kan was a satirical 'chanson' (music by Antonin Louis, words by Paul Burani) which became very popular in Paris after the fall of Napoleon III and mocked the ex-emperor, his family and court.

== Performance history ==
Fisch-Ton-Kan (with the title Peh-Li-Khan) was first performed with Chabrier at the piano on 31 March 1875 at the 'Cercle de l'Union artistique' in Paris, where an earlier operétte bouffe to which Chabrier contributed, Le service obligatoire (now lost), had been mounted in December 1872. The next performance was on 22 April 1941 at the Salle du Conservatoire, Paris with Francis Poulenc accompanying at the piano. An orchestration for strings and wind quartet (1974) was made by Roger Delage, and broadcast that year on French radio.

== Roles ==
Role	Voice type	Premiere Cast, March 31, 1875 (Piano accompaniment by: Chabrier)
Fisch-Ton-Kan	tenor	A member of the Cercle de l'Union artistique
Poussah, tumbler toy	baritone	A member of the Cercle de l'Union artistique
Goulgouly, daughter of the prime minister Kaout-Chouc	soprano	Mme Priola (?), also a member
Kakao, Emperor of China	baritone	A member of the Cercle de l'Union artistique

== Synopsis ==
from the original play
From a balcony of the palace, Goulgouly takes a fancy to a young man below: Fisch-Ton-Kan. When each declares their love, he reveals to her that he is a Tartar prince exiled when he was 17 months old for having insulted Kakao, his father's enemy. Kakao orders all foreigners to cut off their right ear and leave it at the customs. When Kakao arrives on his palanquin he asks that boiling water be poured into a giant tea-pot in which Fisch-Ton-Kan is hiding, but Goulgouly manages to stop him. Kakao wants Goulgouly for himself. When Fisch-Ton-Kan intervenes, Kakao condemns him to be impaled but the young man escapes this fate by proving capable of removing the beetle Kakao is convinced he has on his nose. Offering Fisch-Ton-Kan anything to do this, he naturally chooses the hand of Goulgouly.

== Recordings ==
- Christian Mehn (tenor), Francis Dudziak (baritone), Jean-Louis Georgel (baritone), Mireille Delunsch (soprano). Strasbourg Collegium Musicum Orchestra conducted by Roger Delage. Arion.

Two numbers from Fisch-Ton-Kan were recorded in 2015 by counter-tenor Philippe Jaroussky as part of an extended recital of "Mélodies françaises sur des poèmes de Verlaine".

== See also ==
- Ba-ta-clan, a "chinoiserie musicale" by Jacques Offenbach. First performed in 1855.
