= Étienne Pradeau =

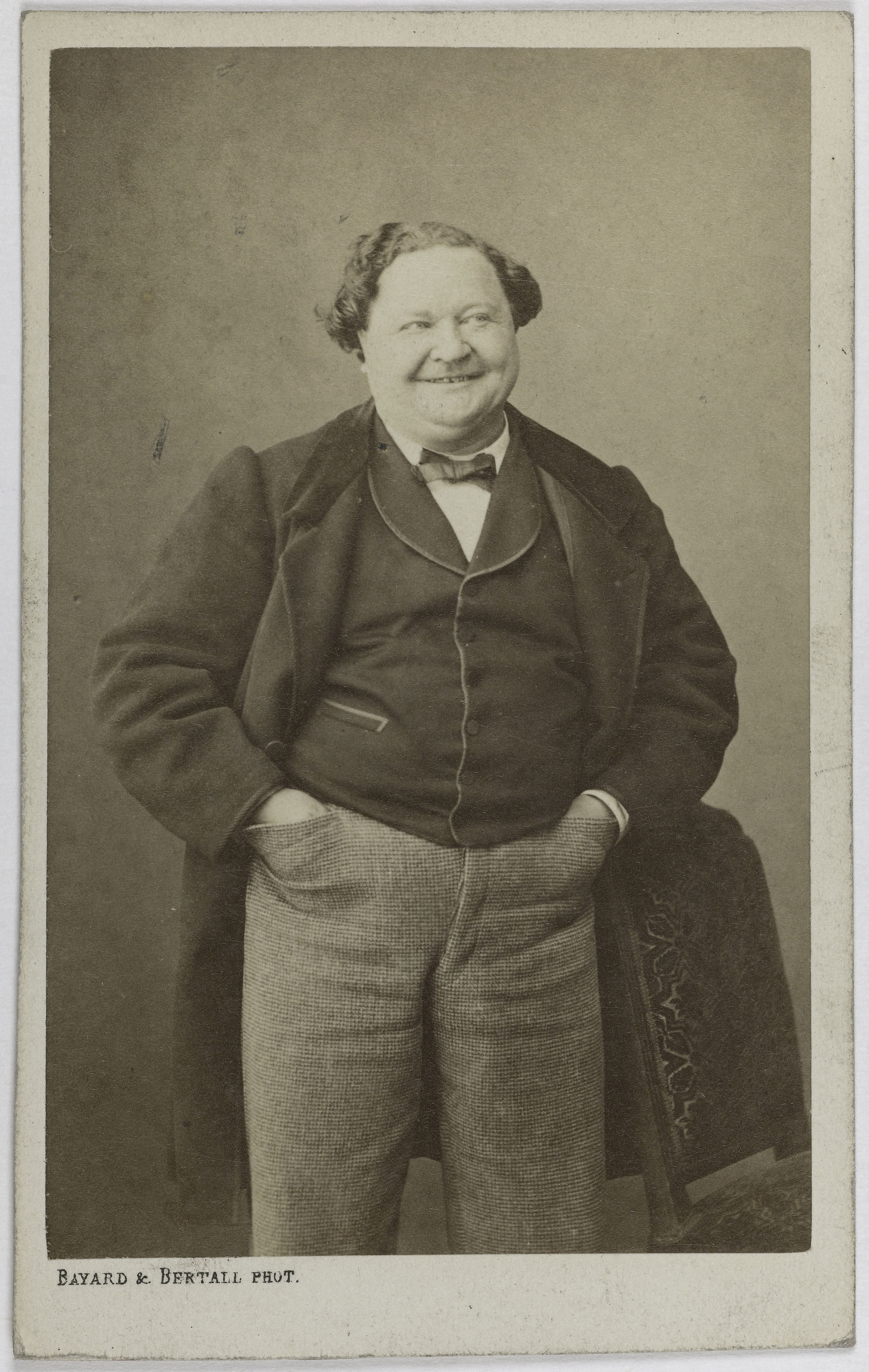
- Portait of Pradeau

Background information
- Born: 11 February 1817; Bordeaux, France
- Died: 20 January 1895 (aged 77)
- Occupations: Singer, actor

Étienne Pradeau was a French singer and actor, born 11 February 1817 in Bordeaux and died 20 January 1895 in Paris, 9th arrondissement, whose career centred on light opera and comedy, especially that of Labiche, and was an original member of Offenbach's troupe at the Bouffes-Parisiens.

== Life and career ==
In a review of le Postillon de Lonjumeau in Rouen, the writer noted "the brilliant return of the trial Pradeau". He made his Paris debut on 18 May 1846 at the Opéra-Comique in the role of Dickson in La Dame blanche by Boieldieu but was not a success. Jacques Offenbach heard him at the Théâtre du Vaudeville in Paris and engaged him as one of the artists who would inaugurate his new Marigny theatre which became the Bouffes-Parisiens. His appearance and character was described as a broad face, a Rabelaisian grin, coupled with a candid and generous good-naturedness.

On 5 July 1855, Pradeau had a massive success as Patachon, one of the two swindling beggars in Les Deux Aveugles, a "bouffonnerie musicale" by Offenbach and Jules Moinaux, which played more than 300 times. From then on he appeared in many of the composer’s premieres up to the transfer to the theatre in the passage Choiseul : the English Captain Grog in Le Rêve d'une nuit d'été, the title role en travesti in Madame Papillon, Emperor Fé-ni-han in Ba-ta-clan (all 1855), Gigonard in Élodie ou le Forfait nocturne, Beaujolais in Tromb-al-ca-zar, an Auvergnat coppersmith in La rose de Saint-Flour, a duped father in Le financier et le savetier (1856), the title role in Croquefer and Gros-Minet in Les Deux pêcheurs (1857). He also sang the Mayor in the premieres of the first operas of Georges Bizet and Charles Lecocq – the Docteur Miracle opérettes, along with the magician Alcofribas in Les Pantins de Violette by Adolphe Adam and Beaucoq in Six demoiselles à marier of Léo Delibes.

After a triumphant tour from Marseille to Bad Ems, Pradeau left the company in unexplained circumstances, missing the creation in 1858 of Offenbach’s first full-length opéra-bouffe Orphée aux Enfers. He joined the Théâtre du Palais-Royal and created roles in many Labiche vaudevilles: Anatole Montchardin in Le Grain de café (a flop), Neptune and Œdipe Roi in the revue En avant les Chinois !, the parfumeur Ben-Sidi Moutonnet in Le Calife de la rue Saint-Bon, the dentist Alzéador in Voyage autour de ma marmite, along with Ma nièce et mon ours by Clairville, Une Giroflée à cinq feuilles, Le Passage Radziwil and Arrêtons les frais. He also took on the former rôles of the actor Sainville such as Le Bourreau des crânes, L'Omelette fantastique, and Le Misanthrope et l'Auvergnat although none of them at the level of what he had performed at the Bouffes.

Pradeau returned to the Bouffes-Parisiens in 1862 where Offenbach offered him roles well suited to his talents: Tympanon in Le Voyage de MM. Dunanan père & fils, Sarmiento in Les bavards, L'Amour chanteur, Bacòlo in a revised Il signor Fagotto and the pacha Rhododendron in Les Géorgiennes. His plump figure made him an ideal Sancho for Victorien Sardou’s Don Quichotte at the Gymnase. Pradeau was engaged there in 1864 and stayed for ten years appearing in forty stage works, displaying the wide range of his acting, a highlight being Morisson in Sardou's Nos bons villageois; in the classics he played Arnolphe in L'École des femmes by Molière.

Following a swift reappearance at the Palais-Royal in 1875 for the premiere of La Guigne of Labiche, he joined the Théâtre des Variétés. There he created roles in Le Manoir de Pictordu - Isidore Flochardet - by Serpette, Le commissaire in La Boulangère a des écus (Offenbach, 1875), Van Tricasse in Le docteur Ox (Offenbach, 1877), Rédillon in Le Roi dort by Labiche alongside Berthelier, Dupuis, Baron and Léonce, and Delacour (1876) as well as taking part in many revivals.

Thereafter Pradeau gradually withdrew from the stage although in 1879 he did appear as Makouli in the Paris premiere of Fatinitza by Suppé at the Théâtre des Nouveautés, and in 1881 Petitbourg in L'Institution Sainte-Catherine at the Théâtre de l'Odéon. He had become a celebrity in Paris, making occasional appearances and in 1883, he received a pension of 500 francs for his 37 years of stage work. His funeral took place on 22 January 1895 at Notre-Dame-de-Lorette. His son Gustave (1845-1914) was a concert pianist, pupil of Georges Mathias, partly based in London, who also composed.
