= Isabella Offenbach Maas =

American opera singer

Isabella Offenbach Maas (March 11, 1817 – February 19, 1891) was an opera singer, pianist and the older sister of composer Jacques Offenbach. She was born in Cologne, Germany and is known for bringing the opera to Galveston, Texas.

== Early life and education ==
Isabella was one of ten children of Isaac Juda Offenbach, né Eberst (1779–1850) and his wife Marianne, née Rindskopf (c. 1783–1840). Isaac, who came from a musical family, had abandoned his original trade as a bookbinder and earned an itinerant living as a cantor in synagogues and playing the violin in cafés. He was generally known as "der Offenbacher", after his native town, Offenbach am Main, and in 1808 he officially adopted Offenbach as a surname. (Note: Gammond and Almeida state that Isaac was already using the surname Offenbach by the time of his marriage in 1805. Yon states that the formal adoption of the surname in 1808 was in compliance with a Napoleonic decree requiring Jewish surnames to be regularised.) In 1816 he settled in Cologne, where he became established as a teacher, giving lessons in singing, violin, flute, and guitar, and composing both religious and secular music.

Isabella played piano in a trio with her brothers Jacob (Jacques) cello, and Julius (violin). They performed popular dance music and operatic arrangements at local dance halls, inns and cafés.

== Biography ==
Maas met her husband, Samuel Maas, during one of her European tours and they were married in Cologne in 1844. Maas and her husband moved to Galveston, her husband's home town, that same year.

Maas's son, Max, built a stage in his home for his mother to perform.

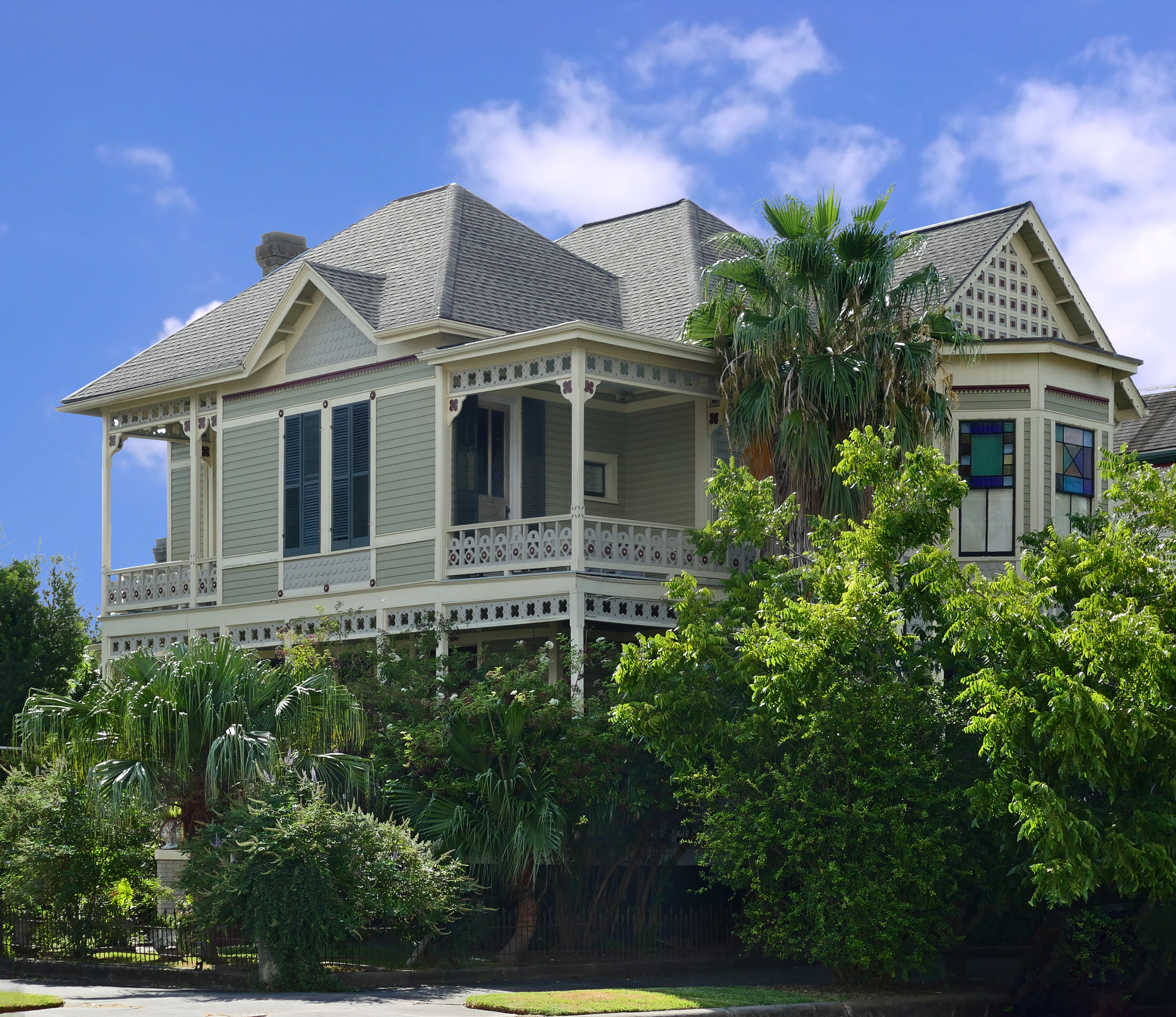
Isabella Offenbach Maas Residence in Galveston

After their fourth child, the couple separated and Maas moved into her daughter's home, living there for nearly 40 years. The home at 1727 Sealy Avenue in Galveston has a Texas State Historical Marker. The house was built in 1886 on the site of another house which had burned down in 1885.

The Galveston Daily News posted that she was "dangerously ill" on February 19, 1891. She died that day.

== Sources ==
- Faris, Alexander (1980). Jacques Offenbach. London: Faber & Faber. ISBN 978-0-571-11147-3.
- Gammond, Peter (1980). Offenbach. London: Omnibus Press. ISBN 978-0-7119-0257-2.
