= La rose de Saint-Flour =

Opérette by Jacques Offenbach

- Opérette by Jacques Offenbach
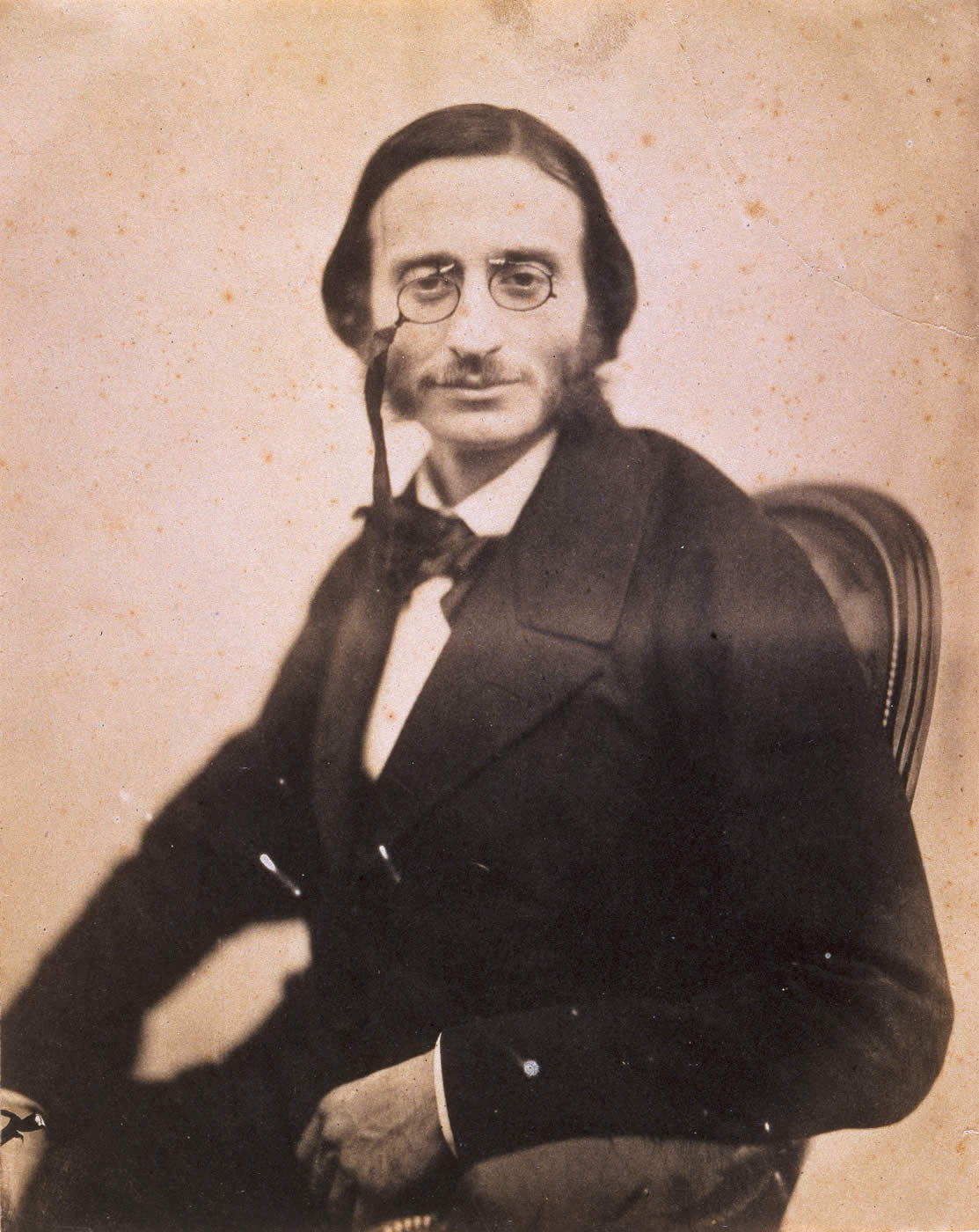
- Jacques Offenbach
- Librettist: Michel Carré
- Language: French
- Premiere: 12 June 1856; Salle Lacaze, Paris

La rose de Saint-Flour is a one-act opérette with music by Jacques Offenbach to a French libretto by Michel Carré, first performed in 1856.

== Performance history ==
The premiere was on 12 June 1856 the Salle Lacaze, Paris, and the work shared its second performance on a bill with the "pièce de circonstance" Les Dragées de baptême, celebrating the christening of the Prince Imperial. The characters in the piece use Auvergnat accents in their dialogue and songs; Pradeau was pure Auvergnat and scored a hit as the jealous coppersmith. The work was much revived over the next twenty years and staged in Vienna. It was performed in England as The Rose of Auvergne, and a full translation with production details published.

== Roles ==
Role	Voice type	Premiere cast, 12 June 1856 (Conductor: Jacques Offenbach)
Pierrette	soprano	Hortense Schneider
Chapailloux	baritone	Charles Petit
Marcachu	tenor	Pradeau

== Synopsis ==
The scene is a cabaret run by Pierrette in Saint-Flour

Alone, Pierrette bemoans her broken cooking-pot and decides to borrow one when she goes out to buy groceries. She muses on her two admirers, the cobbler Chapailloux and the coppersmith Marcachu. As it is the festival of Saint-Pierre, and there will be dancing that night, she longs for a new pair of shoes with sequins to dance in, and a new unbreakable pot.

Marcachu brings in as a token of his love a new cooking-pot for Pierrette, hanging it by the fireplace with a bunch of flowers in, and leaves. Chapailloux next creeps in and puts his present of shoes on the table.

When Pierrette returns a tiff with Marcachu turns into a fight. They prepare the soup, into which unexpected ingredients are placed. When Chapailloux arrives, they eat and discover the contents of the soup, including one of Pierrette's shoes. Another fight ensues, and Marcachu storms off with his marmite.

Pierrette decides she would be better off with Chapailloux and he hesitantly agrees. Chapailloux gives his hand to Pierrette just as Marcachu re-enters to make up for all the damage, giving Pierrette a new chair, crockery and the cooking-pot.

A bourrée is heard as the signal for dancing. Marcachu concedes, hoping he might be, "comm' dans la Dame blanche" god-father to their children. They dance and sing "Nous n'étions ni homm's ni femmes – Nous étions tous Auvergnats!" ("We are neither men nor women – we are Auvergnats!").

== Musical numbers ==
- Overture
- Couplets "Entre les deux amours"
- Air "Chette marmite neuve mamjel est une preuve"
- Recitative and couplets "Ah! que cette maison… Pour les p'tits pieds de chelle que j'aime"
- Grand duo "Eh! la p'tit mère… Quand je cogn' ch'est pour de bon"
- Duetto "Monsieur de Marcachu – Monsieur de Chapaillou"
- Trio and couplets "Ah! Comm'nous nous amujames"
- Trio and finale "Je vous épouse et je vous tends la main"
