= Il signor Fagotto =

Opérette by Jacques Offenbach

Jacques Offenbach by Nadar, c. 1860s

Il signor Fagotto is a one-act opérette by Jacques Offenbach to a French libretto by Charles-Louis-Étienne Nuitter and Étienne Tréfeu, first performed in 1863. The story of a father outwitted and true love winning is set within "a burlesque of musical styles".

== Performance history ==
The work was premiered by Offenbach’s company at Bad Ems, before transferring to the Théâtre des Bouffes Parisiens, Rue Monsigny, Paris, a few months later, where it enjoyed several revivals. The work was performed in a revised form in Vienna shortly after the premiere of Die Rheinnixen in 1864 and dedicated to Eduard Hanslick.

Il signor Fagotto forms part of the Keck Offenbach edition. The autograph of the score, in the possession of Offenbach descendants, and sources from Vienna have formed a critical edition of three versions (Bad Ems, Paris, Vienna), which was premiered at the Opéra National de Lyon in October 2001.

== Roles ==
Role	Voice type	Premiere cast, Bad Ems, 11 July 1863 (Conductor: Offenbach)	Revised version cast, Paris, 18 January 1864 (Conductor:)
Bertolucci, a music lover	baritone	Desmonts	Desiré
Clorinda, Bertolucci's daughter	soprano	Taffanel	Taffanel
Fabricio, Clorinda's lover	soprano	Dartaux	Lucille Tostée
Bacòlo, servant to Bertolucci	tenor	Gustave Gerpré	Pradeau
Moschetta, servant to Bertolucci	soprano	Zulma Bouffar	Zulma Bouffar
Caramello, an antiques dealer	baritone	Guyot	Georges

== Synopsis ==
Time and Place
A bourgeois salon in the 19th century

Music lover Bertolucci wants his daughter Clorinda to marry the old antique dealer Caramello, who is knowledgeable about classical music, and also a member of the 'National Academy of Amphorae of Pompeii'. Bertolucci has had framed and hung around his salon all the letters sent to him by his musical idol the great Signor Fagotto. Caramello arrives to woo her, the lyre of Pindar under his arm. However, Clorinda is in love with her music tutor Fabricio, a young composer whose work is not music to Bertolucci's ears, but whom Clorinda hopes to wed with the help of her maid Moschetta.

Fabricio arrives and gives Clorinda her music lesson. Bertolucci's servant Bacòlo spots an opportunity for him to win the heart and hand of Moschetta, who has spurned him so far, by assisting with a plot to outwit their master and musical snob. This very day Fagotto has consented to be witness at the signing of the marriage contract between Clorinda and Caramelo. Fagotto appears wearing an eccentric costume; he then displays some especially gymnastic skills and his talent in imitative music including animals and fireworks. Fagotto of course is not the real maestro but Bacòlo in disguise; Bertolucci overwhelmed by his artistry and his admiration knows no bounds.

When Caramelo declaims an ode, this is met with scorn by Fagotto, who lauds the music of young Fabricio, whose talent – as revealed by the great Fagotto – is now praised in turn by Bertolucci. Having previously treated him with contempt, with Fagotto’s imprimatur Bertolucci would now consent to him marrying his daughter. Caramello is furious and attacks Fagotto, and in the confusion Bacòlo loses his wig and the scheme is revealed. Bacòlo admits that he was the author of the letters received by Bertolucci from his idol. The marriage of Clorinda and Fabricio is agreed and Moschetta, impressed by Bacòlo’s work, agrees she will have him in the end.
