= Mireille Delunsch =

French soprano

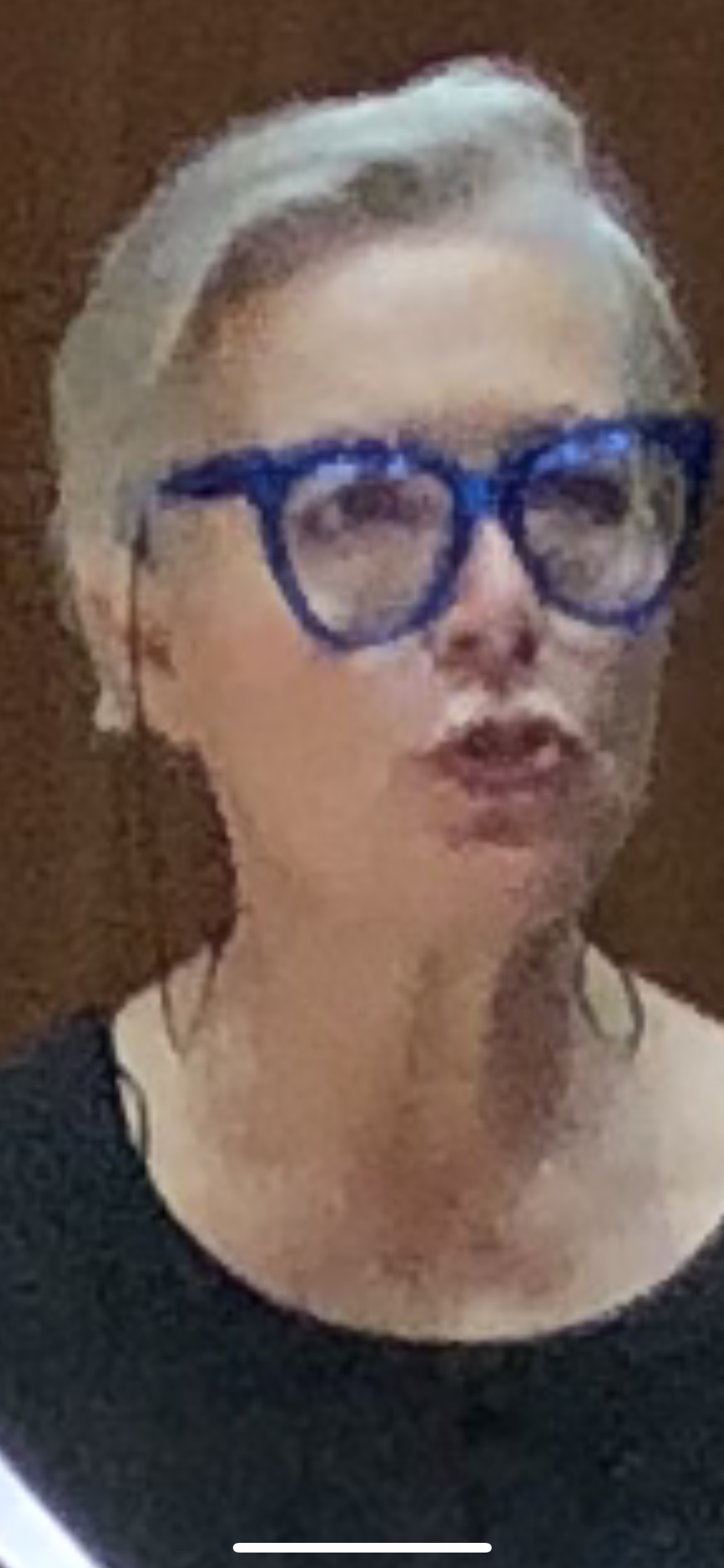
- Delunsch in 2022
- Born: 2 November 1962 (age 63); Mulhouse, Grand Est, France
- Occupation: Soprano
- Website: www.mireilledelunsch.com

Mireille Delunsch (born 2 November 1962) is a French soprano. She was born in Mulhouse, and studied musicology and voice at the Conservatoire de Strasbourg. Her debut was at the Opéra national du Rhin in Mulhouse, in Mussorgsky's Boris Godunov.

Her repertory is wide, from Baroque opera to 20th-century art songs, with an emphasis on French music. She is well known for the operas she has sung under the direction of French conductor Marc Minkowski.

== Recordings ==
Among the operas Delunsch has recorded with Minkowski are:

- La dame blanche by Boïeldieu (1996, released 1997, EMI Classics) - Jenny
- Armide by Gluck (1996, released 1999, Archiv) - Armide
- Dardanus by Rameau (1998, released 2000, Archiv) - Vénus
- Iphigénie en Tauride by Gluck (1999, released 2001, Archiv) - Iphigénie
- Orphée et Eurydice (French version) by Gluck (2002, released 2004, Archiv) - Eurydice

and DVD/TV broadcast

- L'incoronazione di Poppea by Monteverdi (2000, DVD) - Poppea
- Die Fledermaus by Johann Strauss II (2001, DVD) - Rosalinde
- Platée by Rameau (2002, DVD) - La Folie & Thalie
- Gala Jean-Philippe Rameau - Concert du 20ème anniversaire des Musiciens du Louvre (2003, TV)

Other recordings include:

- Herminie by Hector Berlioz, conducted by Philippe Herreweghe (1995, Harmonia Mundi)
- Elektra by Richard Strauss conducted by Friedemann Layer (1995, released 2001, Naïve) - Fünfte Magd
- Pelléas et Mélisande by Claude Debussy conducted by Jean-Claude Casadesus (1997, Naxos Records) - Mélisande
- Complete Songs by Henri Duparc (2000, Timpani)
- Cantates de Rome by Maurice Ravel (2000, EMI Classics), conducted by Michel Plasson
- Les deux journées by Luigi Cherubini, conducted by Christoph Spering (2002, Opus 111)
- Fisch-Ton-Kan by Emmanuel Chabrier, conducted by Roger Delage (1992, Arion)

Delunsch has also appeared in a number of opera telecasts.
