= Le pont des soupirs =

1861 opéra bouffe by Jacques Offenbach

Jacques Offenbach by Nadar, c. 1860s

Le pont des soupirs ("The Bridge of Sighs") is an opéra bouffe (or operetta) set in Venice, by Jacques Offenbach, first performed in Paris in 1861. The French libretto was written by Hector Crémieux and Ludovic Halévy. Plays, including melodramas, set in Venice were quite common in Paris in the early 19th century; the libretto, by the successful team from Orphée aux enfers, also nods towards the operas La reine de Chypre (1841) and Haydée (1847). Gänzl describes the piece as being in Offenbach's "best bouffe manner", noting a "long list of sparkling and funny musical pieces": the multiple serenade beneath Catarina's balcony, the tale of the loss of the Venetian fleet, the parody of an operatic mad scene for Catarina, and a farcical "quatuor des poignards". Offenbach would return to Venice in the Giulietta act of his final work Les Contes d'Hoffmann.

== Performance history ==
Le pont des soupirs was first performed in a two-act version at the Théâtre des Bouffes Parisiens, Paris on 23 March 1861. A four-act version was subsequently given at the Théâtre des Variétés, Paris on 8 May 1868. From June 1861 Offenbach had taken his production of the opera to the Theater am Franz-Josefs-Kai in Wien, Treumann-Theater in Berlin, the National Theatre in Pesth and finally the Théâtre des Galeries-Saint-Hubert in Brussels.

Its popularity extended further: it was given to Brussels in 1861, Buenos Aires in 1870, and New York in 1871 (in French). In translation it was produced in Vienna in 1862, Berlin in 1862, Graz in 1865 and Budapest in 1865, followed by other local premieres and runs in the French provinces. The first production in England was at St James's Theatre in 1872 as The Bridge of Sighs, and a year later it was seen at the Carltheater in Vienna.

More recently a production by Jean-Michel Ribes at the Théâtre de Paris (with tour and broadcast) in 1987-88 was nominated for a Molière Award.

Offenbach biographer Alexander Faris notes similarities between Le pont des soupirs and Sullivan's The Gondoliers of 1889; he comments "in both works there are choruses à la barcarolle for gondoliers and contadini [in] thirds and sixths; Offenbach has a Venetian admiral telling of his cowardice in battle; Gilbert and Sullivan have their Duke of Plaza-Toro who led his regiment from behind", both also over-work the cachucha rhythm".

== Roles ==
Cover of score of 4-act version

Role	Voice type	Premiere Cast, 23 March 1861 (Conductor: Jacques Offenbach)
Amoroso, a pageboy	mezzo soprano	Lucille Tostée
Astolfo	bass	Guyot
Cascadetto	tenor	Charles Desmonts
Cornarino Cornarini, Doge of Venice	tenor	Désiré
Catarina Cornarini, his wife	soprano	Lise Tautin
Baptiste, the Doge's equerry	tenor	Debruille-Bache
Fabiono Fabiani Malatromba, member of the Council of Ten	tenor	Pierre-Armand Potel
Franrusto	bass	Duvernoy
Arlequin		May
Colombine		Igasty
Laodice		Legris
The chief of the Council of Ten		Tacova
Gondoliers, servants of Catarina, People, Masks, Bravi, Guards

== Synopsis ==
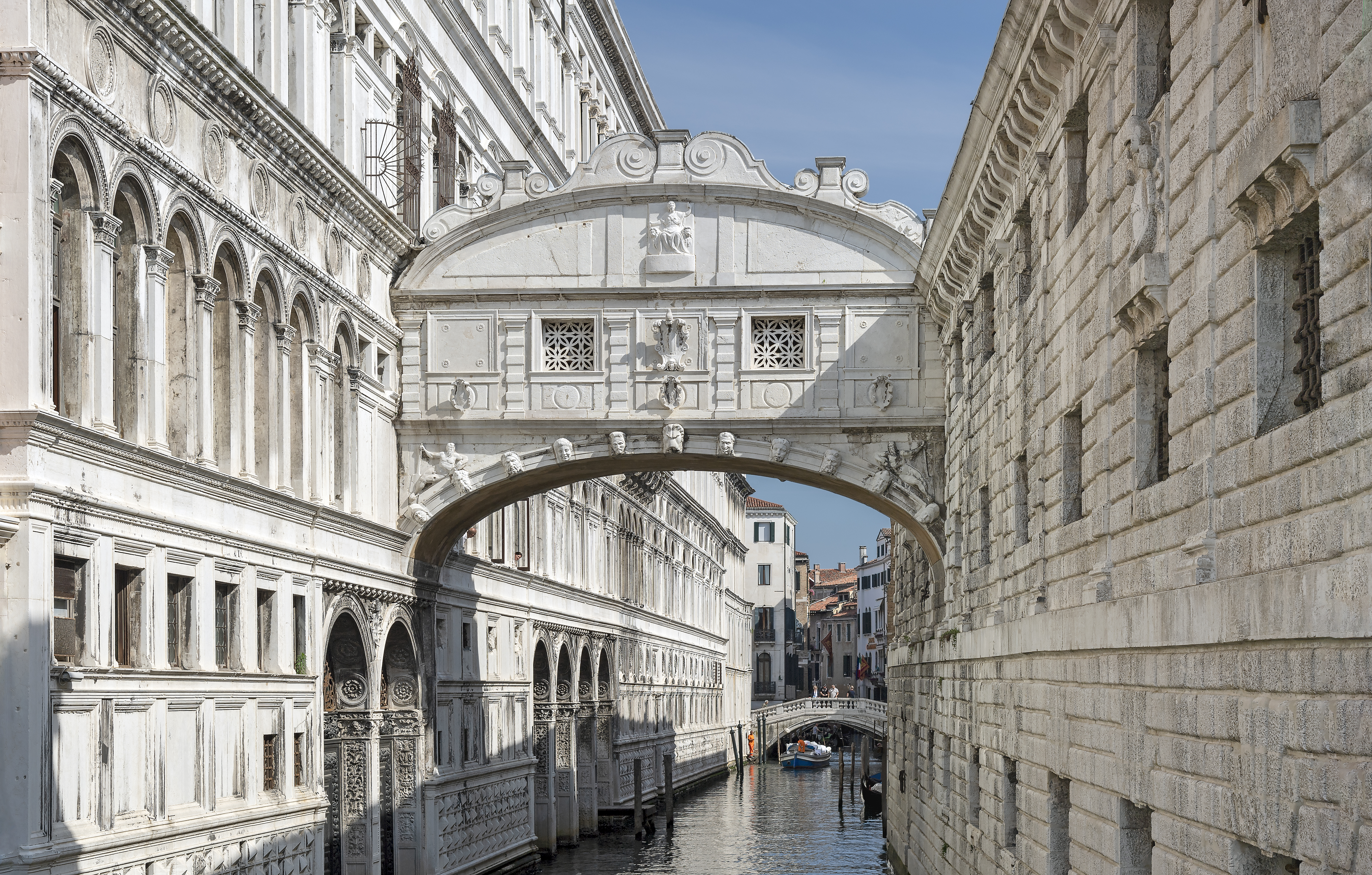
Le pont des Soupirs, Venice (The Bridge of Sighs)

Place: Venice
Time: 1321

Cornarino Cornarini, the Doge of Venice and admiral of the Venetian fleet, has deserted the navy in fear of defeat in a sea battle, and so is under a cloud of disgrace. He and his squire Baptiste return in disguise to his palace to find his wife, Catarina, being serenaded, first by the page Amoroso, then by his villainous and ambitious cousin, Fabiano Fabiani Malatromba. Malatromba has Amoroso arrested. Cascadetto and a mob enter denouncing Cornarini. Cascadetto sings a lament on the cowardice of the doge; Cornarini and his squire are obliged to buy a copy of it with the doge's portrait in order to hunt him down. Malatromba returns and enters the Cornarini palace to seduce Catarina. The doge and Baptiste try to enter also but as the mob return they climb onto the balcony.

Catarina is telling Laodice of her love for Amoroso when two cloaked henchmen enter her rooms. When the women retire to the boudoir, Cornarini and Baptiste now enter, still in disguise, and a dagger quartet for the four men ends with the doge and his companion prevailing over the two Council spies, taking their uniforms and hiding the two bodies in a clock and a barometer. Catarina suddenly returns and pleads with her disguised husband to save her from the advances of Malatromba. When she faints Malatromba tells the supposed spies to hide in the clock and barometer; as Malatromba tries to drag Catarina off, Amoroso, who has escaped prison, suddenly appears and draws his sword. Fights break out in the hiding places; the four men emerge and in the confusion the room fills with soldiers, spies, squires and Catarina's female servants. Cornarini and Baptiste get arrested but claim to have proof of the Doge's demise, which they will reveal to the Council of Ten.

At the Council of Ten most of the councillors are asleep and only awake with the entry of a delegation of female gondoliers. Malatromba requests that the Council hear the testimony of the two men (Cornarini and Baptiste) about the disgraced doge. They claim to have killed Cornarini; they hope this will allow them freedom and Malatromba hopes he can now become doge. Catarina and Amoroso now appear disguised as knights, claiming that Cornarini is alive. Suspicious of the other men, Amoroso tears off their eye patches, and Cornarini and Baptiste are exposed; Cornarini admits who he is and is led off for execution for cowardice against the enemy as the Council of Ten proclaim Malatromba the new Doge. The head of the Council belatedly reads a scroll which had been delivered earlier. This reports that the admiral's flight from battle was a ruse to fool the Matalosses who have suffered a devastating naval defeat. With the Council believing they have two doges, Malatromba is temporarily thwarted.

The final scene is on the Lido, and the carnival is in progress. Cascadetto announces that to decide which of the two doges should rule, the Council will make them joust on the Orfano canal near the piazza San Marco. Cornarini and Malatromba enter on their individual floats and in the joust the latter loses (due to Amoroso arranging for Malatromba's boat to be scuttled). In the second version (1868) the two doges have to collect a cup from a mast, Malatromba winning and becoming doge. As consolation Cornarini is sent as Venetian ambassador to Spain, with Amoroso as his secretary (to the pleasure of Catarina), and the opera ends with a boléro.

== Recordings ==
- Recordings as listed on operadis-opera-discography.org.uk
