= Lischen et Fritzchen =

Operetta by Jacques Offenbach

Jacques Offenbach by Nadar, c. 1860s

Lischen et Fritzchen is a one-act operetta (« conversation alsacienne » - Alsatian conversation) with music by Jacques Offenbach to a French libretto by ‘P Dubois’ (Paul Boisselot), first performed in 1863.

== Performance history ==
The premiere was on 21 July 1863 at the Kursaal, Bad Ems, during a successful summer season for the composer. The Paris premiere followed at the newly refurbished Théâtre des Bouffes Parisiens, Paris, on 5 January 1864, sharing the bill with Les deux aveugles, L'amour chanteur and La tradition. Both characters in the piece use an Alsatian accent in their dialogue and songs. It marked one of the early hits for Zulma Bouffar.

A story that Offenbach had composed the piece in eight days to win a bet may only be a myth.

Offenbach set the fable of The Town Mouse and the Country Mouse (to different music) in his Six Fables de La Fontaine (1842).

== Roles ==
Role	Voice type	Premiere cast, 21 July 1863 (Conductor: Jacques Offenbach)	Paris premiere cast, 5 January 1864 (Conductor: Alphonse Varney)
Lischen	soprano	Zulma Bouffar	Zulma Bouffar
Fritzchen	baritone	Jean-Paul	Desiré

== Synopsis ==
A crossroads; a wine merchant’s house on the left with a seat outside, on the right a stone bench

Fritzchen, an Alsatian servant, sacked because he presented his master’s lady with a beer (une bière) rather than a jewel (une pierre) rests by the roadside on his way back to Alsace. Lischen enters, also returning homeward as she cannot make any money in Paris for herself and her old father as a broom-seller. Fritzchen falls for the young Alsacienne, as they both plan to continue their journey. Lischen sings the story of The Town Mouse and the Country Mouse, which she had sung in Paris to make up the shortfall in selling brooms. Adversity draws the two together, and during a conversation in which they admit their mutual love, it seems that they are brother and sister. However, in a letter from Fritzchen’s father it emerges that Lischen was an illegitimate daughter of his sister and therefore he was only her uncle. Now that a marriage between Lischen and Fritzchen is possible, in joy the couple join arms and continue their way home.

== Musical numbers ==
- Overture
- Couplets « Me chasser, me forcer »
- Chanson « P’tits balais, p’tits balais »
- Duo « Je suis alsacienne, je suis alsacien »
- Fable « Un jour un rat de ville invita le rat des champs »
- Final et duo « Quoi ! Fritzchen »
