= Les bavards =

Opéra bouffe, or operetta, by Jacques Offenbach

Jacques Offenbach by Nadar, c. 1860s

Les bavards (English: The Chatterboxes) is an opéra bouffe, or operetta, by Jacques Offenbach, with a French libretto by Charles-Louis-Étienne Nuitter based on "Los dos habladores", a story by Miguel de Cervantes.

== Performance history ==
Les bavards was originally created as Bavard et bavarde in one-act form and performed at the Kurtheater, Bad Ems in June 1862. It became Die Schwätzerin von Saragossa for Vienna in November of that year, and was produced in its final two-act form at the Théâtre des Bouffes Parisiens, Paris (Salle Choiseul) on 20 February 1863, with Delphine Ugalde as Roland, Thompson as Inès, Tostée as Béatrix and Étienne Pradeau as Sarmiento, conducted by Offenbach. It entered the repertoire of the Paris Opéra Comique on 3 May 1924 conducted by Maurice Frigara, produced by Albert Carré, with Germaine Gallois as Roland and Marguerite Roger as Béatrix.

It was recorded (as Pratkvarnen) on Swedish television in 1981 with Britt Marie Aruhn and Enzo Florimo among the principals.

A critical edition has been published as part of the Offenbach Edition Keck (OEK), and the work is still occasionally performed.

== Roles ==
Role	Voice type	Premiere cast, Bad Ems, 11 June 1862 (Conductor:)	Revised version cast, Paris, 20 February 1863 (Conductor: Jacques Offenbach)
Roland	contralto	Delphine Ugalde	Delphine Ugalde
Sarmiento	bass	Étienne Pradeau	Étienne Pradeau
Béatrix, Sarmiento's wife	soprano	Lucille Tostée	Lucille Tostée
Inès, their niece	soprano		Thompson
Pedro, servant of Sarmiento	spoken role		Luigi Walter
Cristobal, the alcade	bass	Désiré	Désiré
Torribo, his scrivener	tenor		Édouard
Catalinon, a cigar merchant, creditor	soprano		
Torbisco, a barber, creditor	soprano		
Bernadillo, a muleteer, creditor	soprano		
Barocal, a shoemaker, creditor	soprano		
Chorus: creditors and neighbours

== Synopsis ==
Time: 17th century
Place: Zaragoza - in front of, and in the courtyard of Sarmiento’s house

=== Act 1 ===
Roland, a penniless young poet, is trying to escape from his various creditors and succeeds in hiding from them; he finds himself outside Sarmiento's house.
He has fallen in love with Inès, the niece of Sarmiento, a wealthy man kept busy counting his money, who is wearied by his talkative wife Béatrix. Going out, Sarmiento meets his wife coming home, talking continuously, who launches into a song about her good character, then leaves again, still talking. Next the alcalde Cristobal, also a chatterbox, passes by, sympathizing with Sarmiento's lot.
As Sarmiento returns to go back into his house, Roland comes out from his hiding place and decides to take advantage of the situation. He begins a long recitation of his woes and in the ensuing duet agrees to get Béatrix to stay quiet (hoping also to be in close proximity to his beloved Inès). Sarmiento asks him to come to dinner once he has found better clothes; as Roland's creditors appear again he rushes off dragging Sarmiento with him. The creditors go off to find Roland while Cristobal and Torribo doze off guarding the front door. Sarmiento and Roland, now finely dressed, return and enter the house.

=== Act 2 ===
The scene opens with Béatrix bemoaning her lot. As she and Inès prepare to set the table Sarmiento enters with Roland and the young man is introduced to the women. Roland immediately starts talking non-stop and Béatrix is taken aback. Even when they sit down to eat Roland's babbling continues without a break. Sarmiento tells Béatrix, overcome by their guest's volubility, that Roland is to stay for seven years.
Under the guise of finally settling Sarmiento's dispute, Cristobal and Torribio are admitted and, after being given false information by Roland on ‘his’ whereabouts, depart with Sarmiento. To get Béatrix's approval for him to wed Inès, Roland reveals to Béatrix what he had agreed with her husband. To revenge herself on Sarmiento, she pretends in dumb-show that she has exchanged billets-doux with Roland. Sarmiento, bewildered by everyone behaving as if they are struck dumb and jealous because of the supposed love letters, is happy to learn that the real object of the exchange of letters is Inès.
The alcade and creditors arrive with a message from Roland promising that Sarmiento will pay off his debts. Sarmiento is forced to agree and gives his approval to the marriage. All celebrate the settlement of all their problems.
