= Zulma Bouffar =

Singer from France

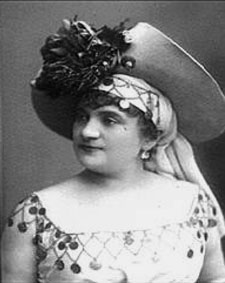
Zulma Bouffar

Zulma Madeleine Boufflar, known as Zulma Bouffar, (24 May 1841 – 20 January 1909), was a French soprano singer and actress, associated with the opéra-bouffe of Paris in the second half of the 19th century who enjoyed a successful career around Europe.

== Life and career ==
At the age of six, Bouffar appeared in La fille bien gardée in Marseille, and followed this with successful performances in Lyon. Her father then toured with her around western Europe and Scandinavia. After her father's death in 1854 she continued travelling, bringing into her repertoire some of the contemporary songs of Offenbach, who heard her sing in Hamburg in 1864. The same year Bouffar appeared at Bad Ems in Offenbach's Lischen et Fritzchen, and repeated her success in Paris.

From this time for about 12 years Bouffar was probably Offenbach's mistress – his longest extra-marital liaison. She created Nani in Les géorgiennes, Éros, L'Intendant and Jeannet in Les bergers, Gabrielle in La Vie parisienne, Drogan in Geneviève de Brabant, Toto in Le château à Toto, Fragoletto in Les Brigands, Robin Luron in Le Roi Carotte, Ginetta in Les braconniers, Moschetta in Il signor Fagotto and Prince Caprice in Le voyage dans la lune – a range of men's and women's roles.

In 1873 Bouffar was reported in the Parisian press to have been considered for the title role of Bizet's new opera, Carmen. Although the composer denied the story, the singer did attend the premiere of the piece in 1875.

From 1891 to 1893 Bouffar became the manager of the Théâtre de l'Ambigu-Comique. In the latter part of her stage career, Bouffar appeared in operettas by Lecocq and Strauss, and sang around Europe. She announced her retirement from the stage in 1902.
