= List of operettas by Jacques Offenbach =

Poster for a 19th-century production of Orpheus in the Underworld

This is a complete list of the 98 operettas of Jacques Offenbach (1819–80).

== Subgenres ==
The stage works of Offenbach (with the two exceptions of the opéras Die Rheinnixen and The Tales of Hoffmann) are broadly referred to as 'operettas' in English references, even though only 16 of them were designated as opérettes by the composer. Offenbach called a further 8 opérette bouffe, and there is a single 'opérette fantastique'. There are 24 opéras comiques, and 24 opéras bouffes, together with 2 'opéras bouffes féeries'.

Other minor subgenres include opéra bouffon (5), bouffonnerie musicale (3), saynète (2) pièce d'occasion (2) and revue (2). Offenbach invented names for some individual works: 'anthropophagie musicale', 'chinoiserie musicale', 'comédie à ariettes', 'conversation alsacienne', 'légende bretonne', and 'légende napolitaine'. There are also one each of the following; 'fantasie musicale', 'opéra féerie', 'tableau villageois', and 'valse'.

== List of operettas ==
Operettas by Jacques Offenbach
Title	Genre	Acts	Libretto	Premiere	
Title	Genre	Acts	Libretto	Date	Venue
L'alcôve	opéra comique	1 act	Philippe Auguste Pittaud de Forges, Adolphe de Leuven and Eugène Roche	24 April 1847	Paris, Salle Moreau-Sainti
Blanche	opéra comique	1 act	Jules-Henri Vernoy de Saint-Georges	composed ca. 1847, but unperformed	
La Duchesse d'Albe	opéra comique	3 acts	Jules-Henri Vernoy de Saint-Georges	composed 1847–48, but unperformed	
Le trésor à Mathurin	tableau villageois	1 act	Léon Battu	7 May 1853 (concert performance)	Paris, Salle des Concerts Herz
Pépito	opéra comique	1 act	Léon Battu and Jules Moinaux	28 October 1853	Paris, Théâtre des Variétés
Luc et Lucette	opéra comique	1 act	Philippe Auguste Pittaud de Forges and Eugène Roche	2 May 1854	Paris, Salle des Concerts Herz
Le décaméron, ou La grotte d'azur	légende napolitaine	1 act	Joseph Méry	May 1855	Paris, Salle des Concerts Herz
Entrez, messieurs, mesdames	pièce d'occasion	1 act	Joseph Méry and Jules Servières (Ludovic Halévy)	5 July 1855	Paris, Bouffes-Parisiens, Salle Lacaze
Une nuit blanche	opéra comique	1 act	Édouard Plouvier	5 July 1855	Paris, Bouffes-Parisiens, Salle Lacaze
Les deux aveugles	bouffonnerie musicale	1 act	Jules Moinaux	5 July 1855	Paris, Bouffes-Parisiens, Salle Lacaze
Le rêve d'une nuit d'été	saynète	1 act	Étienne Tréfeu	30 July 1855	Paris, Bouffes-Parisiens, Salle Lacaze
Oyayaye, ou La reine des îles	anthropophagie musicale	1 act	Jules Moineaux	26 June 1855	Paris, Folies-Nouvelles
Le violoneux	légende bretonne	1 act	Eugène Mestépès and Émile Chevalet	31 August 1855	Paris, Bouffes-Parisiens, Salle Lacaze
Madame Papillon	opérette	1 act	Jules Servières (Ludovic Halévy)	3 October 1855	Paris, Bouffes-Parisiens, Salle Lacaze
Paimpol et Périnette	saynète	1 act	de Lussan Philippe Auguste Pittaud de Forges	29 October 1855	Paris, Bouffes-Parisiens, Salle Lacaze
Ba-ta-clan	chinoiserie musicale	1 act	Ludovic Halévy	29 December 1855	Paris, Bouffes-Parisiens, Salle Choiseul
Trafalgar – Sur un volcan	comédie à ariettes	1 act	Ernest L'Épine and Joseph Méry	29 December 1855	Paris, Bouffes-Parisiens, Salle Choiseul.
Un postillon en gage	opérette	1 act	Édouard Plouvier and Jules Adenis	9 February 1856	Paris, Bouffes-Parisiens, Salle Choiseul
Tromb-al-ca-zar, ou Les criminels dramatiques	bouffonnerie musicale	1 act	Charles-Désiré Dupeuty and Ernest Bourget	3 April 1856	Paris, Bouffes-Parisiens, Salle Choiseul
La rose de Saint-Flour	opérette	1 act	Michel Carré	12 June 1856	Paris, Bouffes-Parisiens, Salle Lacaze
Les dragées du baptême	pièce d'occasion	1 act	Charles-Désiré Dupeuty and Ernest Bourget	14 June 1856	Paris, Bouffes-Parisiens, Salle Lacaze
Le 66	opérette	1 act	Philippe Auguste Pittaud de Forges and Laurencin (Paul-Aimé Chapelle)	31 July 1856	Paris, Bouffes-Parisiens, Salle Lacaze
Le financier et le savetier	opérette bouffe	1 act	Hector-Jonathan Crémieux and Edmond About	23 September 1856	Paris, Bouffes-Parisiens, Salle Choiseul
La bonne d'enfant	opérette bouffe	1 act	Eugène Bercioux	14 October 1856	Paris, Bouffes-Parisiens, Salle Choiseul
Les trois baisers du diable	opérette fantastique	1 act	Eugène Mestépès	15 January 1857	Paris, Bouffes-Parisiens, Salle Choiseul
Croquefer, ou Le dernier des paladins	opéra bouffe	1 act	Louis-Adolphe Jaime and Étienne Tréfeu	12 February 1857	Paris, Bouffes-Parisiens, Salle Choiseul
Dragonette	opéra bouffe	1 act	Eugène Mestépès and Louis-Adolphe Jaime	30 April 1857	Paris, Bouffes-Parisiens, Salle Choiseul
Vent du soir, ou L'horrible festin	opérette bouffe	1 act	Philippe Gille	16 May 1857	Paris, Bouffes-Parisiens, Salle Choiseul
Une demoiselle en loterie	opérette	1 act	Louis-Adolphe Jaime and Hector-Jonathan Crémieux	27 July 1857	Paris, Bouffes-Parisiens, Salle Lacaze
Le mariage aux lanternes (revised version of Le trésor à Mathurin)	opérette	1 act	Michel Carré and Léon Battu	10 October 1857	Paris, Bouffes-Parisiens, Salle Choiseul
Les deux pêcheurs, ou Le lever du soleil	opérette bouffe	1 act	Charles-Désiré Dupeuty and Ernest Bourget	13 November 1857	Paris, Bouffes-Parisiens, Salle Choiseul
Mesdames de la Halle	opérette bouffe	1 act	Armand Lapointe	3 March 1858	Paris, Bouffes-Parisiens, Salle Choiseul
La chatte métamorphosée en femme	opérette	1 act	Eugène Scribe and Mélesville	19 April 1858	Paris, Bouffes-Parisiens, Salle Choiseul
Orphée aux enfers	opéra bouffon	2 acts	Hector-Jonathan Crémieux and Ludovic Halévy	21 October 1858	Paris, Bouffes-Parisiens, Salle Choiseul
Un mari à la porte	opérette	1 act	Alfred Charles Delacour (Alfred Charlemagne Lartigue) and Léon Morand	22 June 1859	Paris, Bouffes-Parisiens, Salle Lacaze
Les vivandières de la grande-armée	opérette bouffe	1 act	Louis-Adolphe Jaime and Philippe Auguste Pittaud de Forges	6 July 1859	Paris, Bouffes-Parisiens, Salle Lacaze
Geneviève de Brabant	opéra bouffon	2 acts	Louis-Adolphe Jaime and Étienne Tréfeu	19 November 1859	Paris, Bouffes-Parisiens, Salle Choiseul
Le carnaval des revues	revue	1 act	Eugène Grangé, Philippe Gille and Ludovic Halévy	10 February 1860	Paris, Bouffes-Parisiens, Salle Choiseul
Daphnis et Chloé	opérette	1 act	Clairville and Jules Cordier (Élénore Tenaille de Vaulabelle)	27 March 1860	Paris, Bouffes-Parisiens, Salle Choiseul
Barkouf	opéra bouffe	3 acts	Eugène Scribe and Henri Boisseaux, after Abbé Blanchet	24 December 1860	Paris, Opéra-Comique, Salle Favart
La chanson de Fortunio	opéra comique	1 act	Hector-Jonathan Crémieux and Ludovic Halévy	5 January 1861	Paris, Bouffes-Parisiens, Salle Choiseul
Le pont des soupirs	opéra bouffon	2 acts	Hector-Jonathan Crémieux and Ludovic Halévy	23 March 1861	Paris, Bouffes-Parisiens, Salle Choiseul
M. Choufleuri restera chez lui le …	opéra bouffe	1 act	Monsieur de Saint Rémy (Charles de Morny, Duke of Morny), Ernest L'Épine, Hector-Jonathan Crémieux and Ludovic Halévy	31 May 1861	Paris, Présidence du Corps Législatif
Apothicaire et perruquier	opérette bouffe	1 act	Élie Frébault	17 October 1861	Paris, Bouffes-Parisiens, Salle Choiseul
Le roman comique	opéra bouffon	3 acts	Hector-Jonathan Crémieux and Ludovic Halévy	10 December 1861	Paris, Bouffes-Parisiens, Salle Choiseul
Monsieur et Madame Denis	opéra comique	1 act	Laurencin (Chapelle) and Michel Delaporte	11 January 1862	Paris, Bouffes-Parisiens, Salle Choiseul
Bavard et bavarde (Les bavards)	opéra bouffe	1 act/2 acts	Charles-Louis-Étienne Nuitter after Cervantes	11 June 1862 (1-act version), 20 February 1863 (2-act version)	Bad Ems, Kursaal (1-act version), Bouffes-Parisiens, Paris (2-act version)
Le voyage de MM. Dunanan père et fils	opéra bouffon	3 acts	Paul Siraudin and Jules Moinaux	23 March 1862	Paris, Bouffes-Parisiens, Salle Choiseul
Jacqueline	opérette	1 act	P d'Arcy (Hector-Jonathan Crémieux and Ludovic Halévy)	14 October 1862	Paris, Bouffes-Parisiens, Salle Choiseul
La baguette (Fédia)	opéra comique	2 acts	Henri Meilhac and Ludovic Halévy	composed 1862, but unperformed	
Il signor Fagotto	opérette	1 act	Charles-Louis-Étienne Nuitter and Étienne Tréfeu	11 July 1863	Bad Ems, Kursaal
Lischen et Fritzchen	conversation alsacienne	1 act	Paul Dubois (Paul Boisselot)	21 July 1863	Bad Ems, Kursaal
L'amour chanteur	opérette	1 act	Charles-Louis-Étienne Nuitter and Ernest L'Épine	5 January 1864	Paris, Bouffes-Parisiens, Salle Choiseul
Les géorgiennes	opéra bouffe	3 acts	Jules Moinaux	16 March 1864	Paris, Bouffes-Parisiens, Salle Choiseul
Le fifre enchanté, ou Le soldat magicien	opéra comique	1 act	Charles-Louis-Étienne Nuitter and Étienne Tréfeu	12 July 1864	Bad Ems, Kursaal
Jeanne qui pleure et Jean qui rit	opérette	1 act	Charles-Louis-Étienne Nuitter and Étienne Tréfeu	19 July 1864	Bad Ems
La belle Hélène	opéra bouffe	3 acts	Henri Meilhac and Ludovic Halévy	17 December 1864	Paris, Théâtre des Variétés
Coscoletto, ou Le lazzarone	opéra comique	2 acts	Charles-Louis-Étienne Nuitter and Étienne Tréfeu	11 July 1865	Bad Ems, Kursaal
Les refrains des bouffes	fantaisie musicale	1 act	libretto lost	21 September 1865	Paris, Bouffes-Parisiens, Salle Choiseul
Les bergers	opéra comique	3 acts	Hector-Jonathan Crémieux and Philippe Gille	11 December 1865	Paris, Bouffes-Parisiens, Salle Choiseul
Barbe-bleue	opéra bouffe	3 acts	Henri Meilhac and Ludovic Halévy, after Charles Perrault	5 February 1866	Paris, Théâtre des Variétés
La vie parisienne	opéra bouffe	5 acts	Henri Meilhac and Ludovic Halévy	31 October 1866	Paris, Théâtre du Palais Royal
La Grande-duchesse de Gérolstein	opéra bouffe	3 acts	Henri Meilhac and Ludovic Halévy	12 April 1867	Paris, Théâtre des Variétés
La permission de dix heures	opéra comique	1 act	Mélésville and Pierre Carmouche	9 July 1867	Bad Ems, Kursaal
La leçon de chant électromagnétique	bouffonnerie musicale	1 act	Ernest Bourget	20 July 1867	Bad Ems, Kursaal
Robinson Crusoé	opéra comique	3 acts	Eugène Cormon and Hector-Jonathan Crémieux	23 November 1867	Paris, Opéra-Comique, Salle Favart
Geneviève de Brabant (revised version)	opéra bouffe	3 acts	Étienne Tréfeu and Hector Crémieux	26 December 1867	Paris, Théâtre des Menus-Plaisirs
Le château à Toto	opéra bouffe	3 acts	Henri Meilhac and Ludovic Halévy	6 May 1868	Paris, Théâtre du Palais Royal
Le pont des soupirs (revised version)	opéra bouffe	4 acts	Hector-Jonathan Crémieux and Ludovic Halévy	8 May 1868	Paris, Théâtre des Variétés
L'île de Tulipatan	opéra bouffe	1 act	Henri Chivot and Alfred Duru	30 September 1868	Paris, Bouffes-Parisiens, Salle Choiseul
La Périchole	opéra bouffe	2 acts	Henri Meilhac and Ludovic Halévy	6 October 1868	Paris, Théâtre des Variétés
Vert-Vert	opéra comique	3 acts	Henri Meilhac and Charles-Louis-Étienne Nuitter	10 March 1869	Paris, Opéra-Comique, Salle Favart
La diva	opéra bouffe	3 acts	Henri Meilhac and Ludovic Halévy	22 March 1869	Paris, Bouffes-Parisiens, Salle Choiseul
La princesse de Trébizonde	opéra bouffe	2 acts	Charles-Louis-Étienne Nuitter and Étienne Tréfeu	31 July 1869	Baden-Baden, Kurtheater
La princesse de Trébizonde (revised version)	opéra bouffe	3 acts		7 December 1869	Paris, Bouffes-Parisiens, Salle Choiseul
Les brigands	opéra bouffe	3 acts	Henri Meilhac and Ludovic Halévy	10 December 1869	Paris, Théâtre des Variétés
La romance de la rose	opérette	1 act	Étienne Tréfeu, Jules Prével and Charles-Louis-Étienne Nuitter	11 December 1869	Paris, Bouffes-Parisiens, Salle Choiseul
Boule de neige (revised version of Barkouf)	opéra bouffe	3 acts	Charles-Louis-Étienne Nuitter and Étienne Tréfeu	14 December 1871	Paris, Bouffes-Parisiens, Salle Choiseul
Le roi Carotte	opéra bouffe féerie	4 acts	Victorien Sardou after E. T. A. Hoffmann	15 January 1872	Paris, Théâtre de la Gaîté
Fantasio	opéra comique	3 acts	Paul de Musset after Alfred de Musset	18 January 1872	Paris, Opéra-Comique, Salle Favart
Fleurette, oder Trompeter und Näherin (composed as Fleurette c. 1863)	opéra comique	1 act	Philippe Auguste Pittaud de Forges and Laurencin	12 March 1872	Vienna, Carltheater
Le corsaire noir (performed as Der schwarze Corsar in 1872)	opéra comique	3 acts	Charles-Louis-Étienne Nuitter, Étienne Tréfeu, and Offenbach	21 September 1872	Vienna, Theater an der Wien
Les braconniers	opéra bouffe	3 acts	Henri Charles Chivot and Alfred Duru	29 January 1873	Paris, Théâtre des Variétés
Pomme d'api	opérette	1 act	Ludovic Halévy and William Busnach	4 September 1873	Paris, Théâtre de la Renaissance
La permission de dix heures (revised version)			Mélésville and Pierre Carmouche	4 September 1873	Paris, Théâtre de la Renaissance
La Vie parisienne (revised version)		4 acts	Henri Meilhac and Ludovic Halévy	25 September 1873	Paris, Théâtre des Variétés
La jolie parfumeuse	opéra comique	3 acts	Hector-Jonathan Crémieux and Ernest Blum	29 November 1873	Paris, Théâtre de la Renaissance
La Périchole (revised version)	opéra bouffe	3 acts	Henri Meilhac and Ludovic Halévy	25 April 1874	Paris, Théâtre des Variétés
Bagatelle	opéra comique	1 act	Hector-Jonathan Crémieux and Ernest Blum	21 May 1874	Paris, Bouffes-Parisiens, Salle Choiseul
Madame l'archiduc	opéra bouffe	3 acts	Albert Millaud	31 October 1874	Paris, Bouffes-Parisiens, Salle Choiseul
Whittington (also performed as Le chat du diable, Paris, Théâtre du Châtelet, 19 October 1893)	opéra bouffe féerie	3 acts	Charles-Louis-Étienne Nuitter and Étienne Tréfeu (English text by Henry Brougham Farnie)	26 December 1874	London, Alhambra
Geneviève de Brabant (second revised version)	opéra féerie	5 acts	Étienne Tréfeu and Hector Crémieux	25 February 1875	Paris, Théâtre de la Gaîté
Les hannetons	revue	3 acts	Eugène Grangé and Albert Millaud	22 April 1875	Paris, Bouffes-Parisiens, Salle Choiseul
La boulangère a des écus	opéra bouffe	3 acts	Henri Meilhac and Ludovic Halévy	19 October 1875	Paris, Théâtre des Variétés
Le voyage dans la lune	opéra féerie	4 acts	Eugène Leterrier, Albert Vanloo and Arnold Mortier	26 October 1875	Paris, Théâtre de la Gaîté
La créole	opéra comique	3 acts	Albert Millaud and Henri Meilhac	3 November 1875	Paris, Bouffes-Parisiens, Salle Choiseul
Tarte à la crême	valse	1 act	Albert Millaud	14 December 1875	Paris, Bouffes-Parisiens, Salle Choiseul
Pierrette et Jacquot	opérette	1 act	Jules Noriac and Philippe Gille	13 October 1876	Paris, Bouffes-Parisiens, Salle Choiseul
La boîte au lait	opéra bouffe	4 acts	Eugène Grangé and Jules Noriac	3 November 1876	Paris, Bouffes-Parisiens, Salle Choiseul
Le docteur Ox	opéra bouffe	3 acts	Arnold Mortier and Philippe Gille, after Jules Verne	26 January 1877	Paris, Théâtre des Variétés
La foire Saint-Laurent	opéra bouffe	3 acts	Hector-Jonathan Crémieux, and Albert de Saint-Albin	10 February 1877	Paris, Théâtre des Folies-Dramatiques
Maître Péronilla	opéra bouffe	3 acts	Charles-Louis-Étienne Nuitter, Paul Ferrier and Offenbach	13 March 1878	Paris, Bouffes-Parisiens, Salle Choiseul
Madame Favart	opéra comique	3 acts	Alfred Duru and Henri Chivot	28 December 1878	Paris, Théâtre des Folies-Dramatiques
La marocaine	opéra bouffe	3 acts	Paul Ferrier and Ludovic Halévy	13 January 1879	Paris, Bouffes-Parisiens, Salle Choiseul
La fille du tambour-major	opéra comique	3 acts	Alfred Duru and Henri Chivot	13 December 1879	Paris, Théâtre des Folies-Dramatiques
Belle Lurette	opéra comique	3 acts	Ernest Blum, Edouard Blau and Raoul Toché	30 October 1880	Paris, Théâtre de la Renaissance
Mam'zelle Moucheron	opérette bouffe	1 act	Eugène Leterrier and Albert Vanloo	10 May 1881	Paris, Théâtre de la Renaissance

== Pastiche ==
Theatres in the English-speaking centres used music by Offenbach to create pasticcio during the 1860s and 70s. Many of these pieces were made to libretti completely unknown to Offenbach. Vienna also saw examples of re-use of his music, and the practice continued into the 20th century. Examples include:

- Cigarette, words by G. D'Arcy, 9 September 1876, Globe Theatre, London
- Forty Winks, an English version of Une nuit blanche
- Blush Rose, words by D'Arcy
- The Barber of Bath, words by Farnie
- Der Goldschmied von Toledo, words by Karl Georg Zwerenz mainly using music from Der Schwarze Corsar
- The Happiest Girl in the World, words by E. Y. Harburg, a 1961 Broadway musical
- Christopher Columbus, words by Don White, first performed in London in 1976 by Opera Rara

Le carnaval des revues and Les hannetons include pre-existing scores but were created under Offenbach and include some new music by him.

== See also ==
- For Offenbach's opéras see Die Rheinnixen and Les contes d'Hoffmann.
- For Offenbach's other works, see List of compositions by Jacques Offenbach.
