= List of operas and operettas by Léo Delibes =

This is list of operas and operettas written by the French composer Léo Delibes (1836–1891).

Title	Genre	Subdivisions	Libretto	Première date	Place, theatre
La princesse Ravigote	opéra comique	3 acts		lost	
Le Don Juan suisse	opérette	4 acts		lost	
Le roi des montagnes	opéra comique	3 acts		unfinished	
Deux sous de charbon ou Le suicide de Bigorneau	opérette ('asphyxie lyrique')	1 act	Jules Moinaux	9 February 1856	Paris, Folies-Nouvelles
Deux vieilles gardes	opérette	1 act	Ferdinand de Villeneuve and Alphonse Lemonnier	8 August 1856	Paris, Théâtre des Bouffes-Parisiens
Six demoiselles à marier	opérette	1 act	Ernest Jaime and Adolphe Choler	12 November 1856	Paris, Théâtre des Bouffes-Parisiens
Maître Griffard	opéra comique	1 act	Eugène Mestépès and Adolphe Jaime	3 October 1857	Paris, Théâtre Lyrique
La fille du golfe	opéra comique	1 act	Charles Nuitter	published in 1859	
L'omelette à la Follembuche	opérette	1 act	Eugène Labiche and Marc-Michel	8 June 1859	Paris, Théâtre des Bouffes-Parisiens
Monsieur de Bonne-Étoile	opéra comique	1 act	Philippe Gille	4 February 1860	Paris, Théâtre des Bouffes-Parisiens
Les musiciens de l'orchestre (with Jacques Offenbach, Jules Erlanger, and Aristide Hignard)	opérette	2 acts	Philippe Auguste Pittaud de Forges and Achille Bourdois	25 January 1861	Paris, Théâtre des Bouffes-Parisiens
Les eaux d'Ems	comédie	1 act	Hector-Jonathan Crémieux and Ludovic Halévy	9 April 1861	Paris, Théâtre des Bouffes-Parisiens
Mon ami Pierrot	opérette	1 act	Lockroy (Joseph Philippe Simon)	22 July 1862	Bad Ems, Kursaal
Le jardinier et son seigneur	opéra comique	1 act	Michel Carré and Théodore Barrière	1 May 1863	Paris, Théâtre Lyrique
Le tradition	prologue en vers	1 act	Henri d'Erville	5 January 1864	Paris, Théâtre des Bouffes-Parisiens
Grande nouvelle!	opérette	1 act	Élisabeth Françoise Adam-Boisgonnier	published in 1864	
Le serpent à plumes	farce	1 act	Philippe Gille and Cham (Amédée de Noé)	16 December 1864	Paris, Théâtre des Bouffes-Parisiens
Le boeuf Apis	opéra comique	2 acts	Philippe Gille and Eugène Furpille	15 April 1865	Paris, Théâtre des Bouffes-Parisiens
Malbrough s'en va-t-en guerre – Act 4 only with Georges Bizet (Act 1), Isidore Legouix (Act 2) and Émile Jonas (Act 3)	opérette	4 acts	Paul Siraudin and William Busnach	13 December 1867	Paris, Théâtre de l'Athénée
L'écossais de Chatou	opérette	1 act	Philippe Gille and Adolphe Jaime	16 January 1869	Paris, Théâtre des Bouffes-Parisiens
La cour du roi Pétaud	opéra comique	3 acts	Philippe Gille and Adolphe Jaime	24 April 1869	Paris, Théâtre des Variétés
Le roi l'a dit	opéra comique	3 acts	Edmond Gondinet	24 May 1873	Paris, Opéra-Comique
Jean de Nivelle	opéra	3 acts	Edmond Gondinet and Philippe Gille	8 March 1880	Paris, Opéra-Comique
Lakmé	opéra	3 acts	Edmond Gondinet and Philippe Gille, after Pierre Loti	14 April 1883	Paris, Opéra-Comique
Kassya (unfinished, completed by Jules Massenet)	drame lyrique	5 acts	Henri Meilhac and Philippe Gille	24 March 1893	Paris, Opéra-Comique
