= Alfred Dufresne =

French composer and playwright

Jacques Marie Alfred Dufresne (1822, Orléans – 18 March 1863, Paris) was a 19th-century French composer and playwright.

A student of Fromental Halévy at the Paris Conservatory, he is mostly known for having written music for hundreds of songs by authors such as Jules Verne, Alfred de Musset, Alphonse de Lamartine or Victor Hugo.

He also composed operettas and opéras comiques including L'hôtel de la poste on a libretto by Philippe Gille.

== Works ==
- 1851: La Chèvre perdue, poem by Lebaigue
- 1851: Heureuse !, mélodie, poem by Gustave de Penmarch
- 1853: La Chanson de Fortunio, poem by Alfred de Musset
- 1853: Reflets de Printemps, poem by de Penmarch
- 1853: Sérénade, poem by Victor Hugo
- 1853: Les Soirées d'automne, twelve melodies
- 1854: La Colombe, poem by de Penmarch
- 1854: Album de 10 mélodies, lyrics by Eugène de Lonlay
- 1854: L’Écho du lavoir !, ditty, lyrics by Eugène de Lonlay
- 1854: Écoute, poem by de Penmarch
- 1854: L’Étoile, melody, lyrics by de Penmarch
- 1854: La Fiancée du timbalier, poem by Victor Hugo
- 1854: Le Grillon, melody, poem by Alphonse de Lamartine
- 1854: Hélas !, poem by Lamartine
- 1854: Oh ! batteux battons la gerbe !, chant rustique
- 1854: Pendant l'orage, cavatine
- 1854: Le Sommeil des fleurs, melody, poem by de Penmarch
- 1854: Villanelle, poem by Adrien Decourcelle
- 1855: Les Chants intimes, collection of melodies and romances
- 1855: En avant les zouaves !, chanson guerrière, poem by Jules Verne
- 1855: Sous la tonnelle, poem by de Penmarch, n°2 for tenor or soprano
- 1856: Venant de Pontoise, one-act operetta, lyrics by Eugène Mestépès
- 1857: La Fileuse, rêverie, lyrics by Anne Kerhalet
- 1857: Les Voix dans l'air, rêverie, lyrics by de Penmarch
- 1858: Adieu paniers vendanges sont faites, song, lyrics by de Penmarch
- 1858: Maître Baton, one-act operetta, lyrics by Eugène Bercioux
- 1860: Les valets de Gascogne, one-act opéra comique, with Philippe Gille
- 1861: A L'île de la Jamaïque, Haitian melody, poem by Pierre Faubert
- undated: Chants intimes, mater dolorosa, poem by Charles Lebaigue
- undated: Dieu bénit tout le monde, romance, lyrics by Lebaigue
- undated: Les Muguets blancs, melody, poem by Émile Lecygne
- undated: L'hôtel de la poste, one-act operetta, with Philippe Gille
- undated: La Veillée !, lyrics by Villemontez, music by Pierre Gaveaux, chanson d'autrefois, transcrite et arrangée à 2 voix

== Bibliography ==
- Bulletins de la Société des compositeurs de musique, 1863, (p. 26) (obituary) (Read online)
- Pierre Larousse, Nouveau Larousse illustré: dictionnaire universel, 1898, (p. 870)
- Florian Bruyas, Histoire de l'opérette en France, 1855-1965, 1974, (p. 55)
- Frédéric-Gaël Theuriau, L'univers musical de Jules Verne, actes de la conférence du samedi 21 mai 2005, auditorium de la Bibliothèque municipale de Tours, 2004
