= Écoute =

Écoute (French for 'Listen') may refer to:

- Ecoute (application), for macOS and iOS
- "Écoute" (song), by Alexandra Stan, 2016
- "Écoute", a 1854 song by Dufresne to a poem by Gustave de Penmarch
- Écoute (magazine), German French-language magazine
- Écoute (novel), by Boris Razon
- Écoute (sculpture), by Henri de Miller
