= Faubert =

People commonly known by their family name Faubert include:

- Frank Faubert, Canadian politician
- Ida Faubert, Haitian writer
- Jacques Faubert, Canadian composer and conductor
- Jocelyn Faubert, Canadian psychophysicist
- Julien Faubert, French football player
- Mario Faubert, Canadian ice hockey player and politician
- Pierre Faubert, Haitian poet/playwright

== See also ==
- Foubert, another surname
