= Louise Théo =

Singer

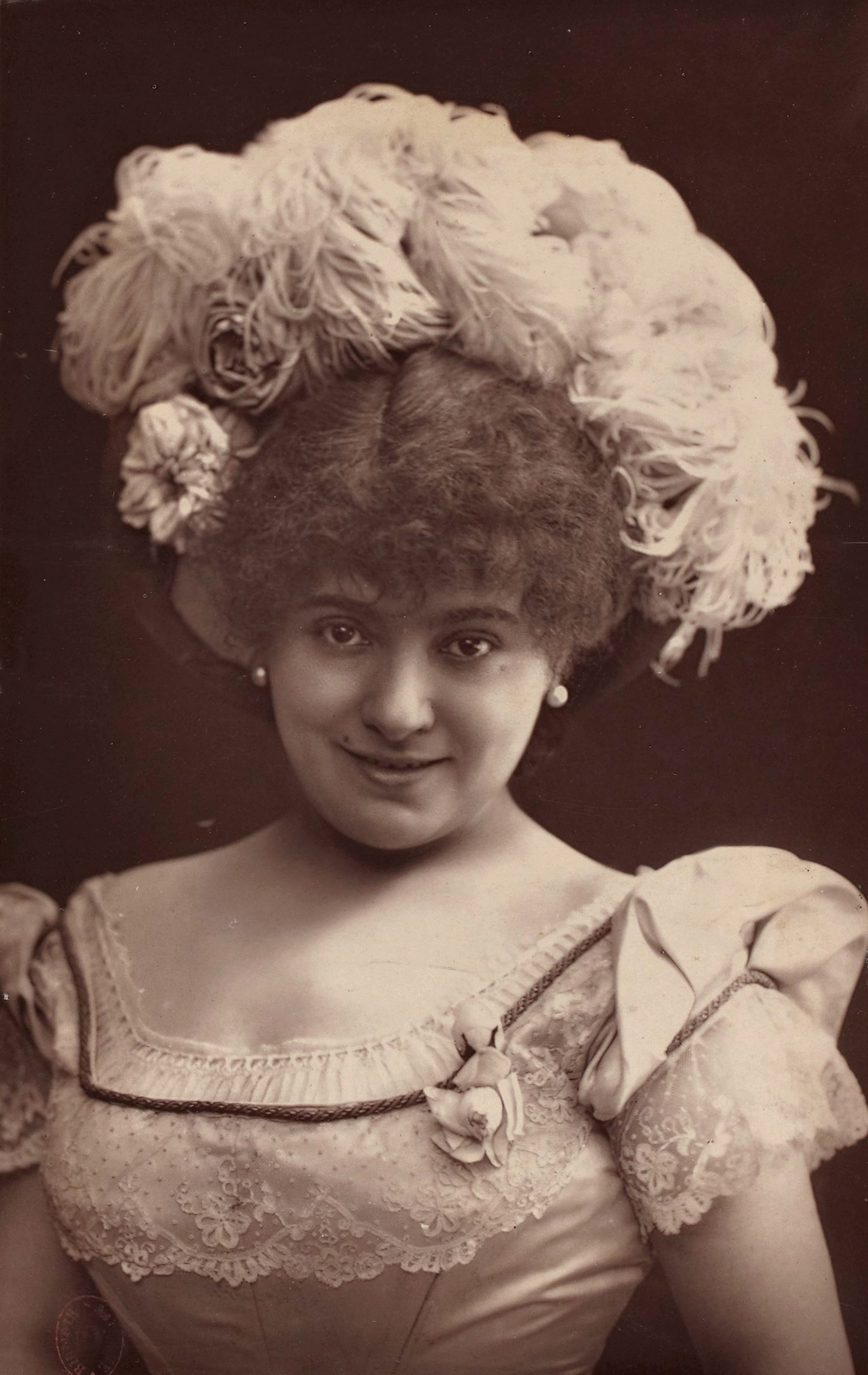
Louise Théo; photograph by Wilhelm Benque (1883)

Louise Théo (French pronunciation: [lwiz teo]; real name Cécile Piccolo; 1854 – 24 January 1922) was a French singer who gained popularity in operetta in France from the 1870s to the end of the 19th century. She created several leading roles in works by Offenbach and also toured to the USA.

== Life and career ==
Théo was born and died in Paris. She began singing as a child with her mother in a café-concert on the Champs-Élysées. After a convent schooling she married and began a theatrical career, including a tour to Vienna, where she was spotted by Offenbach. The composer engaged her at the Théâtre de la Renaissance to create the title roles in Pomme d'api and La jolie parfumeuse (1873). She followed these with Cupidon in Orphée aux enfers, La princesse de Trébizonde, La petite muette, La Timbale and Madame l'archiduc (after which she toured to London with Daubray), at the Théâtre des Bouffes-Parisiens.

She went on to sing in the premiere of Fleur d'Oranger at the Théâtre des Nouveautés in 1878 and sang Cendrillon at the Théâtre de la Porte Saint-Martin in 1879, and Rataplan and Le Tour du Cadran at the Théâtre des Variétés in 1880.

Other creations included Adam et Eve in 1881, Mlle Boniface in 1883, Dix jours aux Pyrénées in 1887 and Mimi in 1888.

Théo visited America in 1883 to appear at the Fifth Avenue Theater, and then toured; she returned the following year, appearing in François les bas-bleus, La fille du tambour-major and Giroflé-Girofla.

She retired as the wife of a rich New York art dealer, Roland Knoedler.
