= A rolling stone gathers no moss =

Latin proverb

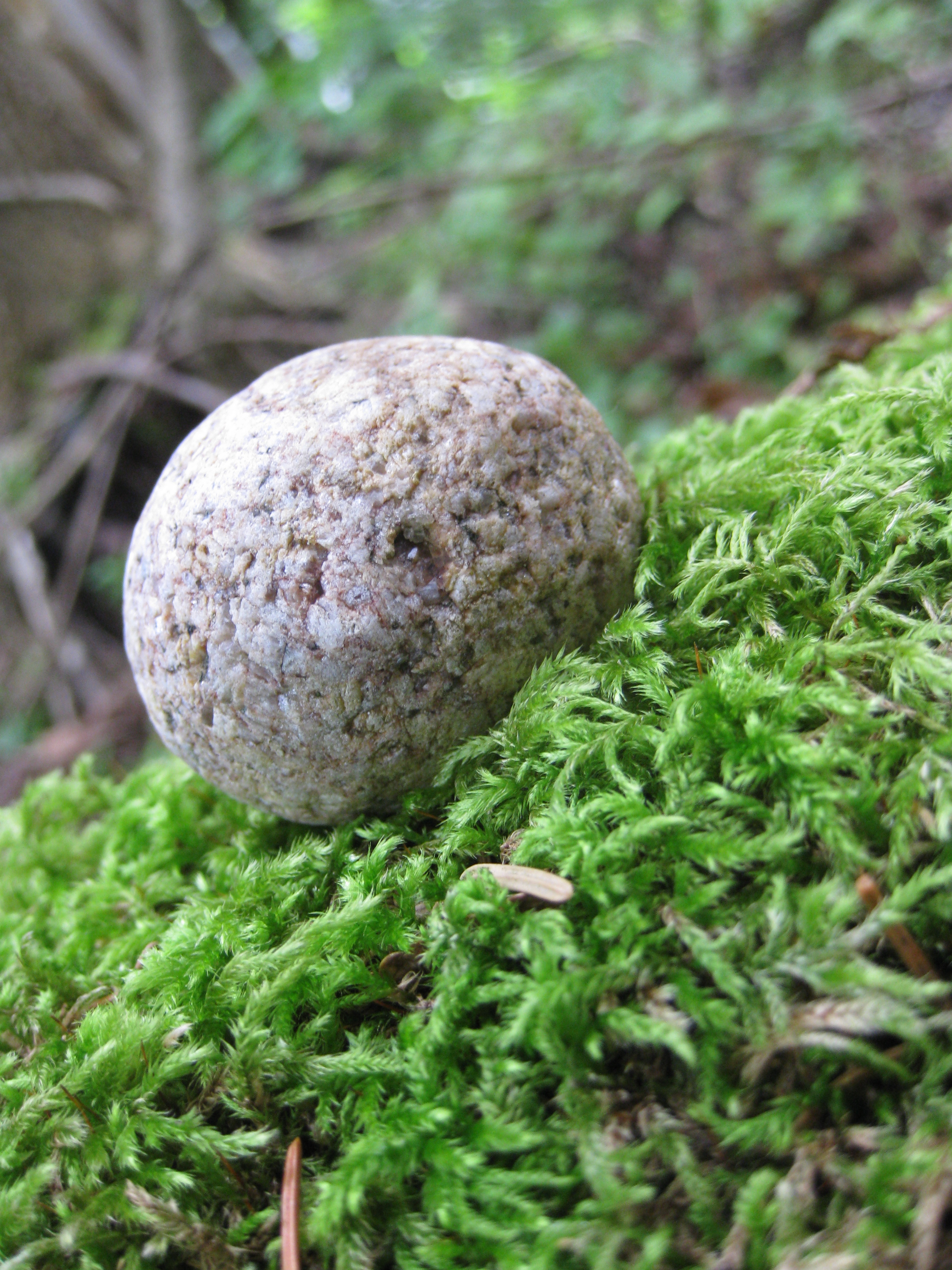
A stone rolls over moss, not gathering any

"A rolling stone gathers no moss" is a proverb, first credited to Publilius Syrus, who in his Sententiae states, "People who are always moving, with no roots in one place or another, avoid responsibilities and cares." The phrase spawned a shorter mossless offshoot image, that of the rolling stone, and modern moral meanings have diverged, from similar themes such as used in the popular song "Papa Was a Rollin' Stone", to a more complementary commentary on "freedom" from excessive rootedness, such as in the band The Rolling Stones.

== Correct attribution ==
The saying may not be authentic to Publilius Syrus, as the Latin form usually given, Saxum volutum non obducitur musco, does not appear in his edited texts. It is first documented in Egbert of Liège collection in Latin, "Fecunda Ratis" ('The Well-Laden Ship'), V. 182, of about 1023: "Assidue non saxa legunt volventia muscum." Therefore, the proverb was not invented but made popular 500 years later by Erasmus' Adagia, first published in England around 1500. Erasmus gave the saying in both Greek and Latin. It is also given as Musco lapis volutus haud obducitur, and in some cases as Musco lapis volutus haud obvolvitur.

== Historical use ==
The conventional English translation first appeared in John Heywood's collection of Proverbs in 1546, crediting Erasmus. Brewer's Dictionary of Phrase and Fable also credits Erasmus, and relates it to other Latin proverbs, "Planta quae saepius transfertus non coalescit" or "Saepius plantata arbor fructum profert exiguum", which means that a frequently replanted plant or tree yields less fruit than an olive or oak tree that is left in place for hundreds of years.

By the 19th century, the theme of "rootlessness having negative consequences" was still much in place. To quote the 1825 Dictionary of Scots Language: "Any gentleman, whether possessing property or not, who was popular, and ready to assist the poor in their difficulties, might expect a day in the moss, as they were wont to term it, and could have them longer for payment." At the time, "A day in the moss" referred to cutting peat in bogs (made of consolidated sphagnum moss) referring to hard work in preparation for winter. An itinerant "rolling stone" will not likely feel the timely need to "gather moss", by applying for access to a community's peat bog.

== 20th century ==
=== In literature ===
The phrase was popular in England in the early 20th century. In Swallows and Amazons, published in 1930 by the English children's author Arthur Ransome, the theft and eventual return of "Captain Flint's" memoirs Mixed Moss by A Rolling Stone, forms an important narrative in the story.

In The Rolling Stones, a 1952 novel by science fiction author Robert A. Heinlein, a family travels throughout the Solar System looking for adventure and money. Hazel Stone, the grandmother, justifies the initiation of their rootless existence saying: "this city life is getting us covered with moss", when they buy their ship, with the theme carrying throughout the book.

In The Return of the King (1955) by J.R.R. Tolkien, Gandalf tells the hobbits that Tom Bombadil "...is a moss-gatherer, and I have been a stone doomed to rolling. But my rolling days are ending, and now we shall have much to say to one another." Though the two are both ancient figures, Gandalf has remained involved throughout history, until here where his story is beginning to recede from the realms of men.

Philip K. Dick's science fiction novel We Can Build You, written in 1962, features a fictionalized psychiatric test for schizophrenia in which a person is asked for the meaning of the proverb (see § In psychiatry below).

=== In music ===
Union activist Joe Hill's last will, written in the form of a song in 1915, states: "My kin don't need to fuss and moan / Moss does not cling to rolling stone." Hank Williams's "Lost Highway" (1948) opened with the line "I'm a rolling stone/All alone and lost", inspiring later songs to use the rolling stone metaphor, many of which dropped the reference to moss.

"Rollin' Stone" is a 1950 song recorded by blues legend Muddy Waters, which inspired the band name The Rolling Stones, and the 1965 song "Like a Rolling Stone" by Bob Dylan, which in turn inspired the magazine Rolling Stone.

Don McLean's "American Pie" (1971) includes the lyrics "Now for ten years we've been on our own / And moss grows fat on a rollin' stone". The Temptations released a notable cover of the song "Papa Was a Rollin' Stone" in 1972 about an absent father.

Dave Matthew's "Busted Stuff" (2002) verse shares "Rolling Stone gathers no moss, but leaves a trail of busted stuff".

"Flames", a 2019 song by ZAYN, R3HAB and Jungleboi contains the line "'Cause I'm a rolling stone / And I keep rolling on".

"Start Nowhere", a song released in 2022 by Sam Hunt includes the lyrics "Well I don't know but I've been told / Moss don't grow on a rolling stone".

=== In psychiatry ===
The saying has been used in psychological tests for mental illness. American psychiatric research conducted in the 1950s between control groups of healthy Air Force personnel against hospitalized Veterans Administration patients with schizophrenia found that the lack of abstraction ability was statistically higher in the VA patients. This led researchers to believe that persons with mental illness were only capable of "concrete" thinking, or interpreting metaphorical or abstract concepts literally, often simply restating the proverb in different words.

The American writer Ken Kesey, who had participated in Air Force mental health studies using LSD, derided what he felt were the simplistic conclusions of these psychiatrists in a scene in his 1962 novel One Flew Over the Cuckoo's Nest. The protagonist, asked by a psychologist what he thinks the proverb means, guesses "It's hard for something to grow on something that's moving." At the end of the novel he is forced to submit to a lobotomy, partially "justified" by the perceived "pathology" indicated by his "concrete" response.

The research results have, in practice, often been improperly generalized to suggest a lack of metaphorical understanding of proverbs alone can be an indicator of mental illness.

=== In film and TV ===
The 1975 film One Flew Over the Cuckoo's Nest included the book's scene with McMurphy ridiculing the psychologist. In 2005 the television show MythBusters rolled a stone constantly for six months, and did not measure any moss growth during that time.

In the 2002 SpongeBob SquarePants episode "The Algae's Always Greener", the character Plankton makes a reference to the proverb stating "a rolling stone gathers no algae."

One of the limousines says the proverb in the last scene of Leos Carax's Holy Motors (2012).

=== In comics ===
A gag of George Herriman's Krazy Kat has Krazy run behind a rolling stone on Ignatz Mouse's account, to literally see whether "it gathers any moss?"

=== In video games ===
The metallic golem Blitzcrank from the video game League of Legends has a voiceline reference to the proverb, stating "a rolling golem gathers no rust".

== See also ==
- Chien de Jean de Nivelle
- Fortune favours the bold
- It ain't over 'til the fat lady sings
