= Pomme d'api =

One-act opérette of 1873 by Jacques Offenbach

Jacques Offenbach by Nadar, c. 1860s

Pomme d'api is a one-act opérette of 1873 by Jacques Offenbach with a French libretto by Ludovic Halévy and William Busnach.

== Background ==
Offenbach had heard Louise Théo singing in café-concert in Paris and although her voice was unremarkable, her stage presence made him decide to centre his next stage work around her. Run-throughs of the opera took place during the summer of 1873 at the 'Villa Orphée' home in Étretat which Offenbach had built and furnished with the royalties from Orphée aux Enfers. Théo's success in Pomme d'api stimulated Offenbach to create a full-length work around her for the Renaissance. In seven weeks he composed La jolie parfumeuse, which, as with the one-act piece, perfectly suited her talent.

== Performance history ==
The première was on 4 September 1873 at the Théâtre de la Renaissance, Paris, on the same bill as La permission de dix heures. On 20 April 1874 Pomme d'api was seen at the Théâtre des Bouffes-Parisiens on a bill with Les rendez-vous bourgeois and La chanson de Fortunio and ran for 60 performances. In 1877 it was staged at the Theater an der Wien. It was not seen in Paris until 1900 when 60 performances were given at the Bouffes-Parisiens. Seven separate broadcast recordings were made by the French national broadcasting between 1945 and 1974.

A revival (in a triple bill with M. Choufleuri restera chez lui le . . . and Mesdames de la Halle) was mounted at the Paris Opéra-Comique in 1979 (with revivals in 1980 and 1983) and recorded in the Salle Garnier, Monte Carlo in September 1982, conducted by Manuel Rosenthal. The piece was seen in Bologna and Jesi in 2010.

== Roles ==
The libretto of the opérette

Role	Voice type	Premiere cast, 4 September 1873 (Conductor: )
Rabastens	baritone	Daubray
Gustave, his nephew	soprano	Anna Dartaux
Catherine	soprano	Louise Théo

== Synopsis ==
Paris, 1873, a room in the house of Rabastens, with doors off

As the curtain rises, the old bachelor and sewing-machine maker Rabastens dismisses his maidservant. He awaits a visit from Gustave, his nephew, whose liaison with a girl called Pomme d'api he views with disapproval, and has therefore cut off his allowance. When Gustave arrives, he admits that he has reluctantly submitted to his uncle's wishes, and broken off with Pomme d'api, despite the fact that instead of her angelic face, he will have to look at his uncle's every evening. He goes to his room. Next the new maid whom Rabastens has engaged via an agency - Catherine - comes in. Rabastens is pleased with her – so much so that he forgets to treat her like a servant, even inviting her to dine with him and his nephew. Gustave recognizes Catherine as his love, but she is indifferent to his regrets, unmoved even by the photo of them the day she was rose queen at Nanterre. To really test his devotion, Catherine allows Rabastens to make advances. During the meal, having taken some champagne, Catherine declares that she has been abandoned by her lover, but in a ‘list’ song she says she will accept the first man to propose, whoever he is, and lets Rabastens embrace her. Gustave is so hurt by this that he makes to leave home. Catherine realizes that he must love her and embraces him. Initially furious, Rabastens relents, gives his blessing to Gustave's marriage, and increases his allowance.

== Musical numbers ==
- Overture
- Couplets (Rabastens) "L’employé m’a dit, de quel âge"
- Romance (Gustave) "Mon oncle ne vous fâchez pas"
- Couplets "Bonjour monsieur je suis la bonne"
- Trio "Va donc, chercher le gril!"
- Duo "C’est un dimanche, un matin"
- Trio "A table! A table!»; Chanson "Versez"; Rondeau "J’en prendrai un, deux, trois"
- Romance "Consultez votre cœur"
- Finale "J’en prendrai un, deux, trois"
