= L'alcôve =

Opéra comique with music by Jacques Offenbach

Jacques Offenbach by Nadar, c. 1860s

L'alcôve is a one-act opéra comique with music by Jacques Offenbach to a French libretto by Philippe Auguste Pittaud de Forges, Adolphe de Leuven and Eugène Roche, first performed in 1847 and one of the earliest surviving stage works in the composer's long career.

== Performance history ==
The work, based on a comédie-vaudeville (with music borrowed from existing stage works by popular contemporary composers) by the same authors, first staged in 1833, was premiered on 24 April 1847 at the Salle Moreau-Sainti (Note: Named after its founder, the singer Théodore François Moreau (dit Moreau-Sainti, after he joined his name with that of the stage-name of his singer wife) located at 18, rue de La Tour d'Auvergne (now in the 9th Arrondissement).) in Paris. Offenbach had originally hoped for it to be adopted by the Opéra Comique, but the director Alexandre Basset appears not to have shown any interest in the work.

The action takes place during the French Revolution in a country house in a village on the French border, where General Raymond, a recruiting sergeant, confronts a wily peasant, Sauvageot, who passes off Marielle as his wife. She is the daughter of the nurse of Comte Anatole d'Ambert, whom Raymond protects, while sending Sauvageot off to the army and marrying Marielle.

The tenor Gustave Roger noted in his diary for Saturday 24 April 1847 that he went with Madame Talma to the salle Moreau-Sainti where he heard Goria play and Dorus sing, then "l’Alcôve, opéra-comique d’Offenbach et de Déforges" where he felt that despite some inexperience there were charming aspects. He went on to say that if the doors of the Opéra-Comique were not barred to him he would go far; "Offenbach est un garçon qui ira très loin si on ne lui ferme pas les portes de l’Opéra-Comique : il a une persévérance du diable et de la mélodie". The full programme on the evening of its premiere, promoted by the composer himself, included a chorus by Offenbach and a cello concerto by him (where he played the solo part). Despite a warm reception from the Ménestrel reporter, the performance did not immediately open the doors of Parisian theatres to a lyrical work by Offenbach.

Alexander Faris states in his study on Offenbach that a German version of l’Alcôve - Marielle, oder Sergeant und Commandant - was performed in Cologne on 9 January 1849 during the composer's stay there following the 1848 revolution. According to Jean-Christophe Keck, the manuscript of L'Alcôve has an earlier version of a solo for Lanternick in La Permission de dix heures, based on an air for Sauvageot.
