= Jean de Nivelle =

French nobleman

Jean de Nivelle (1422 – 26 June 1477) was a French nobleman, son of Jean II of Montmorency, who became a byword for failing to fulfill filial duties and treachery. Called by his father to assist Louis XI in his conflict with Charles the Bold, Duke of Burgundy, de Nivelle instead allied himself with Burgundy and was disinherited as a "dog". This led to lines in multiple songs such as C'est le chien de Jean de Nivelle, il s'enfuit quand on l'appelle (English: The more you call him, the more he runs away, like Jean de Nivelle's dog.)

== Legacy ==
In 1880, Léo Delibes wrote an opera, Jean de Nivelle, based upon de Nivelle's life.
