= Pierre Grivot =

French singer and actor

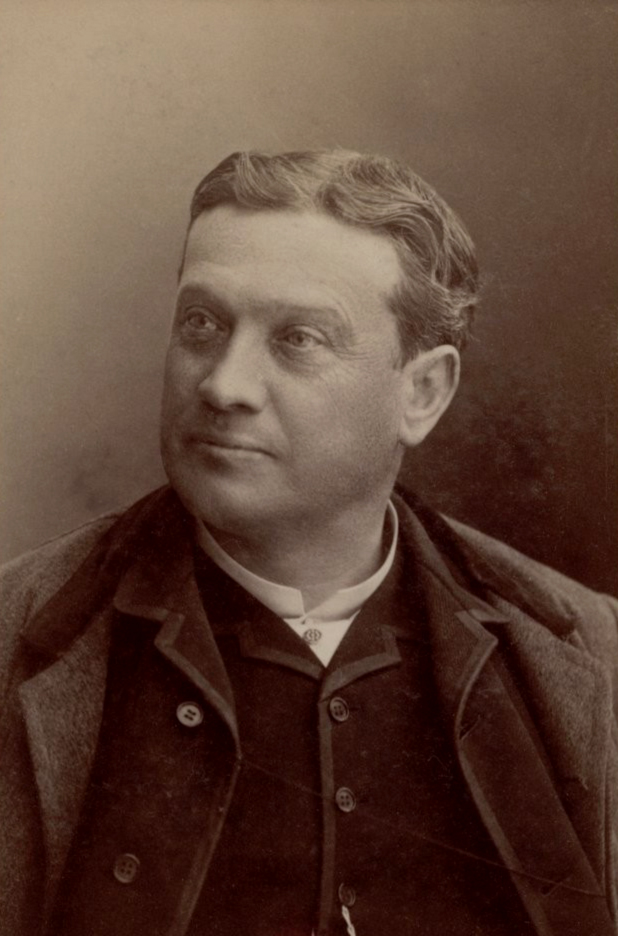
Portrait of Pierre Grivot by Nadar

Pierre-Antonin-François Grivot (French pronunciation: [pjɛʁ ɑ̃tɔnɛ̃ fʁɑ̃swa ɡʁivo]; 1834 (or possibly 1836) in Paris – 1912) was a French singer and actor who enjoyed a long career in Paris, in both operetta and opéra comique. His wife was the actress and singer Laurence Grivot.

== Life and career ==
He made his stage debut at the Théâtre Molière before entering the Théâtre Montmartre and Théâtre des Batignolles. At the Théâtre des Délassements-Comiques he appeared in 1862 in La reine Crinoline. Appearing at the Théâtre du Vaudeville, he sang in La chercheuse d'esprit by Charles-Simon Favart where he met his future wife.

After touring for two years, Grivot joined the Théâtre de la Gaîté in 1869, helping it through the crisis of the Paris Commune, and spent a season in Cairo with his wife.

Returning to France they both were engaged by Offenbach for operettas : at the Théâtre de la Renaissance and again at the Gaîté, with premieres such as Le voyage dans la lune and revivals of Orphée aux enfers and Geneviève de Brabant (1875).

After a year at the Variétés he moved to the Opéra-Comique where he remained as a member of the company employed in the trial repertoire for over 20 years. After his debut as Monostatos in The Magic Flute on 15 November 1879, his many roles included Guillot in La Basoche, Dancaire in Carmen, Lord Elfort in Le domino noir, Thibaut in Les dragons de Villars, Hortensius in La fille du regiment, Cockburn in Fra Diavolo, the doctor in L'irato, Cantarelli in Le pré aux clercs, Bertrand in Les rendez-vous bourgeois, and Miton in Le roi l'a dit. He created roles in Jean de Nivelle by Léo Delibes (Le sire de Malicorne), Les contes d'Hoffmann by Offenbach (servant roles), L'amour médecin (Bahis) and Joli Gilles (Pasquello) by Ferdinand Poise, and Manon by Massenet (Guillot).

After the death of his wife in 1890, he reduced his stage work and retired in 1903.
