= Bagatelle (opera) =

Opéra-comique by Jacques Offenbach

Jacques Offenbach by Nadar, c. 1860s

Bagatelle is a one-act opéra-comique by Jacques Offenbach, with a French libretto by Hector Crémieux and Ernest Blum.

It was first produced on 21 May 1874 at Théâtre des Bouffes Parisiens under the direction of the composer.

== Roles ==
| Role | Voice type | Premiere Cast, 21 May 1874 (Conductor: Jacques Offenbach) |
|---|---|---|
| Bagatelle | soprano | Anna Judic |
| Georges de Planteville | soprano | Laurence Grivot |
| Finette, maid of Bagatelle | soprano | Mme Suzanne |
| Pistache | baritone | Édouard Georges |

== Synopsis ==
The piece is set in the boudoir of a star of café-concert, Bagatelle. Her maid Finette is having an affair with a clarinetist reduced to playing in the Cirque Fernando band, Pistache. After a performance, Bagatelle is rehearsing a peasant song when an 18-year-old young admirer enters through the window. He is Georges de Planteville and to ensure they stay together he throws the keys through the window. However Pistache had been hidden in the apartment also; in the morning Finette has to release all three. It emerges that Georges had defended Bagatelle during her show against detractors, so she returns his love.

== Recordings ==
- Recordings on operadis-opera-discography.org.uk
