= Foubert =

Foubert is a surname. Notable people with the surname include:

- Arthur Foubert (1903–?), Belgian wrestler
- Diederik Foubert (born 1961), Belgian cyclist
- Valentin Foubert (born 2002), French ski jumper

== See also ==
- Faubert, another surname
