= Émile Jonas =

French composer

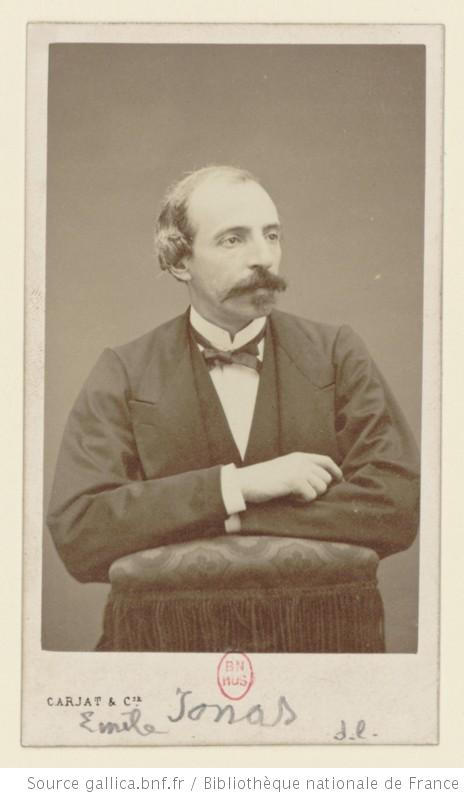
- Émile Jonas photographed by Etienne Carjat
- Born: 5 March 1827; Paris
- Died: 21 May 1905 (aged 78); Saint-Germain-en-Laye
- Occupation: Composer

Émile Jonas (5 March 1827 – 21 May 1905) was a 19th-century French composer.

== Works ==
- 1855: Le Duel de Benjamin, libretto by Eugène Mestépès
- 1856: La Parade, libretto by Jules Barbier and Jules Brésil)
- 1857: Le roi boit, libretto by Adolphe Jaime and Eugène Mestépès
- 1857: Les Petits Prodiges, libretto by Adolphe Jaime and Etienne Tréfeu
- 1863: Job et son chien, libretto by Eugène Mestépès)
- 1864: Le Manoir des Larenardière, libretto by Eugène Mestépès
- 1865: Avant la noce, libretto by Eugène Mestépès and Paul Boisselot
- 1865: Les Deux Arlequins, libretto by Eugène Mestépès
- 1867: Marlbrough s'en va-t-en guerre, composition with Georges Bizet, Isidore Legouix and Léo Delibes, libretto by William Busnach after Paul Siraudin
- 1869: Le Canard à trois becs, libretto by Jules Moinaux
- 1869: Désiré, sire de Champigny
- 1871: Javotte ou Cinderella the Younger, libretto by Alfred Thompson, London
- 1873: Goldchignon (libretto : Eugène Grangé, Victor Bernard and Étienne Tréfeu, in German Julius Hopp), Vienna
- 1874: Die Japanesin, libretto by Eugène Grangé and Victor Bernard, in German, F. Zell and Richard Genée), Vienna
- 1882: La Bonne Aventure, libretto by Hector Crémieux and Albert de Saint-Albin
- 1882: Estelle et Némourin, libretto by Émile de Najac and Henry Bocage
- 1883: Le Premier Baiser, libretto by Émile de Najac and Raoul Toché
- La Princesse Kelebella
- Miss Robinson
