= Émile Chevalet =

French journalist, writer and librettist (1813–1894)

- Born: 1 November 1813; Levroux, Indre, France
- Died: 14 January 1894 (aged 80); Paris, France
- Occupations: Journalist; Historian; Librettist

Émile Chevalet (1 November 1813 – 14 January 1894) was a 19th-century French man of letters, journalist, historian and librettist.

== Biography ==
While he was a notary's clerk in the province, Chevalet published a novel in 1832: Amélie ou la grisette de province under the pen name "Émile Rossi". Having unsuccessfully tried his luck in Paris, he returned as a tutor in the province where he married. He was then attached as an employee at the Ministry of War, where he became office manager. From that moment, he wrote very different kinds of books: vaudeville, operetta librettos, plays, short stories, novels, history books, economics and philosophy essays and even education books for regimental schools without author name.

He wrote the libretto of Le violoneux by Offenbach with Eugène Mestépès, the comedy la Canne d’un brave homme, short stories and novels, collaborating notably with Paul Féval on Madame Pistache (1854), Le Roi de la barrière (1855), Roch Farelli (1854) or with Maurice d’Arcis on les Mémoires d’une pièce de cinq francs (1885) ; la Famille d’un émigré ; les 365, annuaire de la littérature et des auteurs contemporains (1858) ; Précis d’histoire moderne et contemporaine (1865) ; Histoire politique et militaire de la Prusse (1867) ; Mil huit cent quarante-huit, le roman dans l’histoire (1878) ; la Question sociale (1882) ; Voyage en Islande (1884).

As a journalist, he collaborated with Le Corsaire and Le Figaro, contributed articles to the Journal de l’armée territoriale under the pseudonym "Théols" and wrote almost alone the Éclaireur du Berry in the last years of his life. He also completed the Dictionnaire d’Administration militaire by Victor Saussine.

== Works ==
- 1932: Amélie, ou la Grisette de Province, under the pseudonym Émile Rossi, Paris, Lecointe et Pougin, 3 vol. in-12.
- 1836: Pourvoi en grâce, Paris, Lajarry, 343 p., in-8°.
- 1843: Une tache, Paris, De Vigny, (p. 285-295) ; in-8°.
- 1846: La Quiquengrogne, précédée d’une lettre de M. Victor Hugo, Paris, G. Roux et Cassanet, 2 vol. in-8°.
- 1846: Antoine Savary, Nancy, Hinzelin, (p. 265-281), in-8°.
- 1847: Le Château de Lury, Nancy, Hinzelin, 39 p., in-8°.
- 1850: Prudence, Nancy, Hinzelin, 10 p., in-8°.
- 1851: Un conte de fée au XIX, Paris, De Vigny, 15 p., in-8°.
- 1851: Les Ombres gauloises, théâtre de poche en 6 tableaux, Paris, Édouard Dentu, 108 p., in-12.
- 1851: Le Sobriquet, suivi de Modèle de lettre d’un amant à sa maîtresse, Paris, De Vigny, 6 p., in-8°.
- 1852: Rire et satire, anecdotes, pensées, fariboles, actualités, Paris, E. Dentu, 108 p., in-12.
- 1854: Le Livre de Job, Paris, Paul Permain, in-18.
- 1858: Les 365, annuaire de la littérature et des auteurs contemporains par le dernier d’entre eux, Paris, G. Havard, 371 p., in-18.
- 1862: La Canne d’un grand homme, comédie-vaudeville en 1 acte, Paris, Cosson, 19 p., gr. in-8°.
- 1866: Précis d’histoire moderne et contemporaine, Paris, Chamerot et Lauwereyns, 524 p., in-18.
- 1867: Histoire politique et militaire de la Prusse depuis ses origines jusqu’à 1867, Paris, J. Dumaine, in-18.
- 1871: Mon Journal pendant le siège et la Commune, 2nd edition, Paris, Librairie des contemporains, 283 p., in-18.
- 1878: Mil huit cent quarante-huit (le roman dans l’histoire), Paris, E. Dentu, 442 p., in-12.
- 1880: Voyage en Islande : rédigé d’après les notes d’un officier supérieur de la marine de l’État, Paris, Alfred Mame et fils, 143 p., in-8°.
- 1882: La Question sociale, Paris, A. Ghio, 346 p., in-8°.
- 1870–1878: Dictionnaire de législation et d’administration militaires, recueil des lois, décrets, décisions et règlements qui régissent l’armée de terre, éd. Victor Saussine, Paris, Vve Berger-Levrault et fils.
- 1858: Le Violoneux, opérette en un acte, Paris, J. Dagneau, 8 p., in-fol.
- 1879: L'Héritière de Crazanes, Limoges, F.-F. Ardant frères, in-8°, 144 p.
- 1880: Voyage en Islande : rédigé d’après les notes d’un officier supérieur de la marine de l’État, Tours, A. Mame et fils, 143 p., in-8°.

== Sources ==
- Edmond-Denis De Manne, Nouveau dictionnaire des ouvrages anonymes et pseudonymes, 3e éd., Lyon, N. Scheuring, 1868, 607 p., (p. 11).
- Georges Moreau, Revue universelle : recueil documentaire universel et illustré, Vol.9, Paris, Larousse, 1894, (p. 94).
