= Écoute (sculpture) =

Coordinates: 48.8631°N 2.3450°E

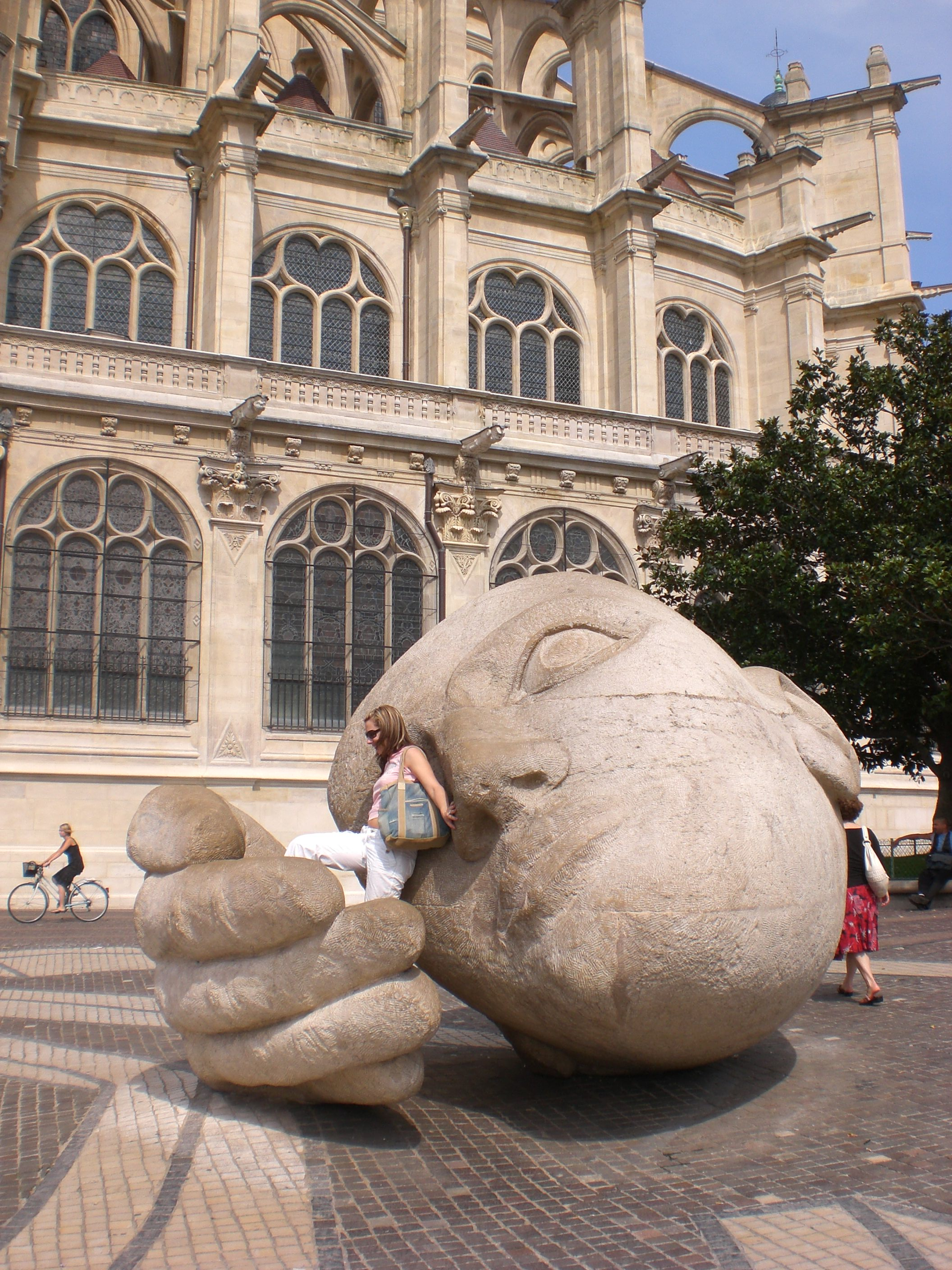
The head in front of the church

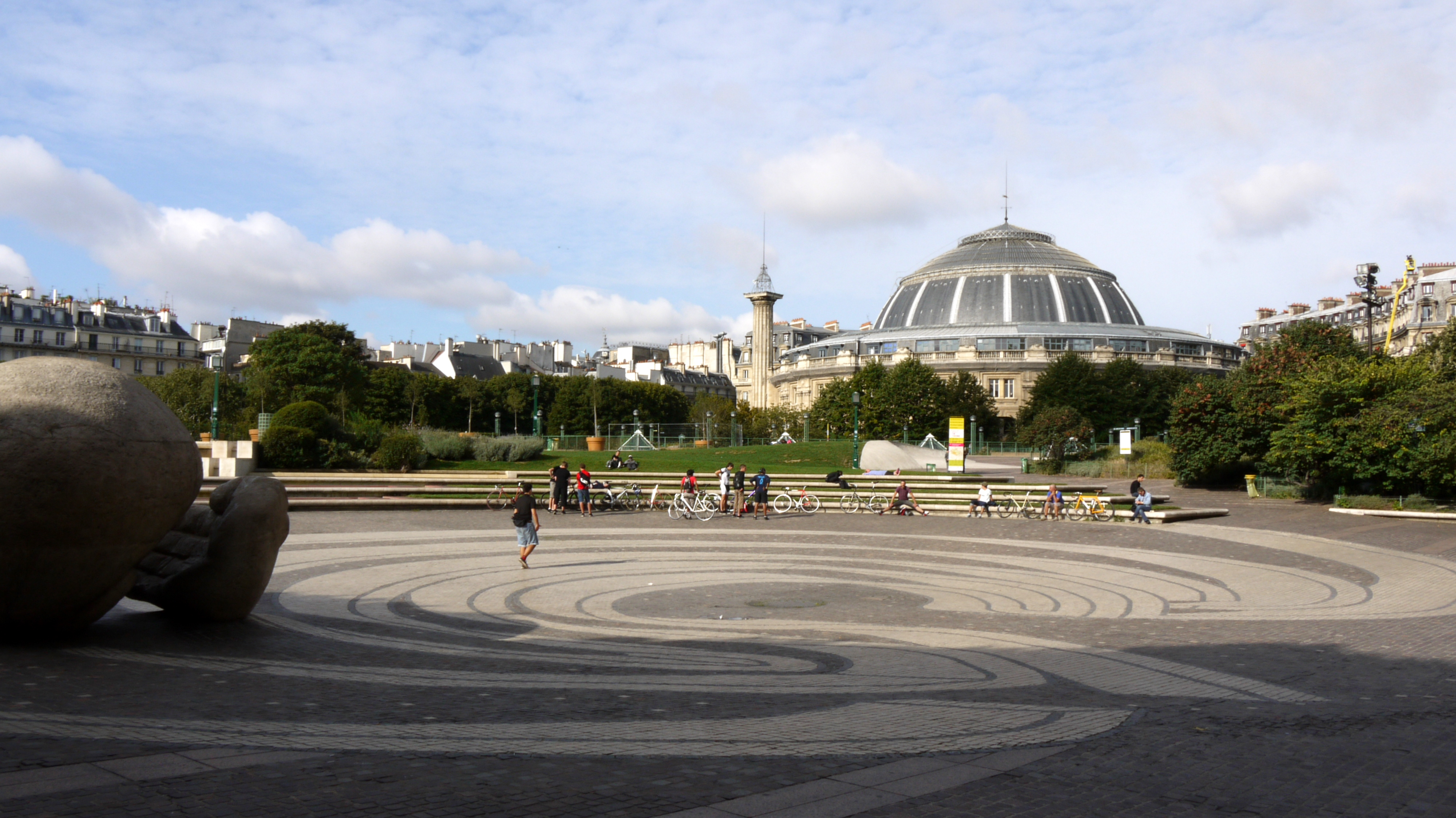
Looking towards the Jardin des Halles

Écoute is a sculpture by the French artist Henri de Miller (1953-1999) in Paris. It is a giant stone head with cupped hand in front of the Church of St-Eustache. It is near to another sculpture by the same artist; a very large sundial designed by the astronomer Dandrel, in the jardin Nelson-Mandela (formerly the Jardin des Halles), above the Forum des Halles.
