= Isidore Legouix =

French composer

- Born: Isidore Edouard Legouix; 1 April 1834; Paris
- Died: 15 September 1916 (aged 82); Boulogne-sur-Seine
- Occupation: Composer
- Spouse: Aurélie Grégoire

Isidore Edouard Legouix (1 April 1834 – 15 September 1916) was a 19th-century French composer.

== Biography ==
Isidore Legouix was the eldest son of the music publisher and bookseller Onesimus Legouix (1809–1867). His father's business, which had opened early in the reign of Louis-Philippe I, was located at 4, rue Chauveau-Lagarde, in the 8th arrondissement. In 1847, Isidore Legouix entered the Conservatoire de Paris where he studied harmony with Napoléon Henri Reber and composition with Ambroise Thomas. He obtained a first prize in music theory in 1850, a first prize in harmony in 1855, and the following year a "2me accessit" in counterpoint and fugue. Competing for the Prix de Rome in 1860, he received an honorable mention for his cantata Le Czar Ivan IV to words by Theodore Anne.

After graduating from the Conservatoire, Legouix worked in the family music shop and engaged in composition, particularly in incidental music. He composed several operettas, of which contemporary critics praised the talent and wit. But one could hardly win against the overwhelming competition of the works by Hervé, Offenbach, Lecocq, Audran, Planquette and Varney, the masters of Parisian operetta. Despite his fifteen works in this genre, Isidore Legouix would never reach the same fame, even if some of his operettas encountered some success. Legouix also composed some pieces for piano and songs. He wrote (in English) the opéra comique The Crimson Scarf (L'Écharpe cramoisie), played in the 1870s in London.

Legouix married in 1900 in Boulogne-sur-Seine with Aurélie Gregory. He died 1916 three weeks after his younger brother Gustave.

His publishing catalogue was taken over by his younger son, Gustave Legouix (1844–1916), then by the latter's son, Robert Legouix. In 1960, the store, under the banner "Libraire Musicale R. Legouix" still remained at the same address (Place de la Madeleine).

== Main works ==
- 1855: la Perle de Normandie, polka mazurka for piano.
- 1863: Un Othello, one-act operetta, lyrics by Charles Nuitter and Alexandre Beaumont, Théâtre des Champs-Élysées, December.
- 1864: Le Lion de Saint-Marc, one-act opéra-bouffe, lyrics by Charles Nuitter and Alexandre Beaumont, Théâtre Saint-Germain, 24 November.
- 1866: Ma Fille, operetta in 1 act, Théâtre des Délassements-Comiques, 20 March.
- 1867: Malborough s'en va-t-en guerre, opéra-bouffe in 4 acts, cowritten with Georges Bizet, Léo Delibes and Émile Jonas (the third act is by Legouix), lyrics by Paul Siraudin and William Busnach, Théâtre de l'Athénée, 15 December.
- 1868: Le Vengeur, opéra-bouffe in 1 act, lyrics by Charles Nuitter and Alexandre Beaumont, Théâtre de l'Athénée, 20 November.
- 1869: Deux portières pour un cordon, pochade musicale in 1 act, written in collaboration with Florimond Hervé, Charles Lecocq and G. Maurice, under the unique pseudonym "Alcindor", lyrics by MMrr. Lefebvre and Lucian, Théâtre du Palais-Royal, 19 March.
- 1869: L'Ours et l'amateur de jardins, bouffonnerie in 1 act, lyrics by William Busnach and Auguste Maquet, Bouffes-Parisiens, 1 September.
- 1874: Les Dernières Grisettes, opéra-bouffe in 3 acts, Théâtre des Fantaisises-Parisiennes in Brussels, 12 December.
- 1876: Le Mariage d'une étoile, operetta in 1 act, lyrics by Eugène Grangé and Victor Bernard, Bouffes-Parisiens, 1 April.
- 1877: Madame Clare, somnambule, « folie » in 1 act with new tunes, Théâtre du Palais-Royal, March.
- La Tartane, operetta.
- Quinolette, one-act operetta, lyrics by Maurice Mac-Nab, published in the magazine Le Magasin des Demoiselles.
- La Clef d'argent, opéra comique 1 act, lyrics byAlexandre Beaumont, published in the magazine Le Magasin des Demoiselles.
- Après la noce, operetta in 1 act.
- La Fée aux genêts, opera, lyrics by Eugène Adenis.
- Une nouvelle Cendrillon, operetta in 1 act, lyrics by Eugène Adenis.
