= Eugène Bercioux =

French playwright and poet

Eugène Bercioux (1822–1898) was a 19th-century French playwright and poet.

== Works ==
- 1847: Les Arabesques, poems, 1847
- 1850: Nisus et Euryale, one-act comédie en vaudeville, with Léon Battu
- 1852: Mam'sell'Rose, one-act comédie en vaudeville, with Adrien Decourcelle
- 1854: Après la bataille, poetry, music by Ernest Boulanger
- 1855: Zamore et Giroflée, one-act comédie en vaudeville, with Charles Narrey
- 1856: La bonne d'enfant, one-act opérette bouffe, music by Jacques Offenbach
- 1858: Maître Baton, one-act operetta, music by Alfred Dufresne
- 1860: La Main du Seigneur, cantique, poem, music by Boulanger
- 1861: La Malédiction, poem, music by Boulanger
- 1878: la Fée Caprice, opéra comique in 2 acts and in verse, music by Achille Mansour
- 1883: La Nuit du bûcheron, ballade, music by Boulanger

== Bibliography ==
- Graham Robb, La poésie de Baudelaire et la poésie française: 1838–1852, 1993, (p. 253)
