= Chien de Jean de Nivelle =

Chien de Jean de Nivelle (English: Jean de Nivelle's dog) is an animal or person who does not want to obey when called to action; as in the expression "the more you call him, the more he runs away, like Jean de Nivelle's dog." The origins of the expression are unknown. It is thought that Jean de Nivelle refused to help his father, Jean II of Montmorency support Louis XI in the war against Charles the Bold, Duke of Burgundy. Furious, his father disinherited him and Jean de Nivelle fled to Flanders, hoping to avoid further troubles.
