= Gustave de Penmarch =

French poet and chansonnier (1822–1901)

Jules François Marie Duplessis Kergomard, called Gustave de Penmarch (14 July 1822, in Morlaix – 28 March 1901, in Morlaix) was a 19th-century French poet and chansonnier.

The husband of Pauline Kergomard (née Reclus) whom he married in 1863, he wrote under her pseudonym many poems often set in music by Alfred Dufresne. In 1875, he published the posthumous works of Gustave de Penmarch who was none other than himself. Jules Duplessis-Kergomard was a penniless man of letters with little interest in working; The couple had two children.

== Works ==
- 1851: Heureuse !, poetry, music by Dufresne
- 1851: Les Feux follets, poems
- 1853: Reflets de Printemps, poetry, music by Dufresne
- 1854: La Colombe, poetry, music by Dufresne
- 1854: Écoute, poetry, music by Dufresne
- 1854: L’Étoile, poetry, music by Dufresne
- 1854: L'Heure des adieux, poetry, music by Dufresne
- 1854: Le Sommeil des fleurs, poetry, music by Dufresne
- 1855: Sous la tonnelle, poetry, music by Dufresne
- 1857: Les Voix dans l'air, rêverie, music by Dufresne
- 1858: Adieu paniers vendanges sont faites, song, music by Dufresne
- 1861: Essai biographique sur Marie Rouault, directeur du Musée géologique de Rennes, in La Sylphide 30 August
- 1865: Les Filles romanesques, published under his real name
- 1868: Enora, poems
- 1875: Gustave de Penmarch. Œuvres posthumes d'un poète breton, preface by Jules Kergomard
- 1878: Le Sommeil des fleurs, poetry, music by Dufresne modernised by Camille Saint-Saëns
- 1880: Washington

== Bibliography ==
- Edmond Antoine Poinsot, Dictionnaire des pseudonymes, 1869, (p. 341)
- Kergomard (Geneviève et Alain), Pauline Kergomard, 2000
- Plaisance, Eric (2001). "KERGOMARD (Geneviève et Alain). – Pauline Kergomard". Histoire de l'Éducation. 89.
