= Daubray =

French opera singer

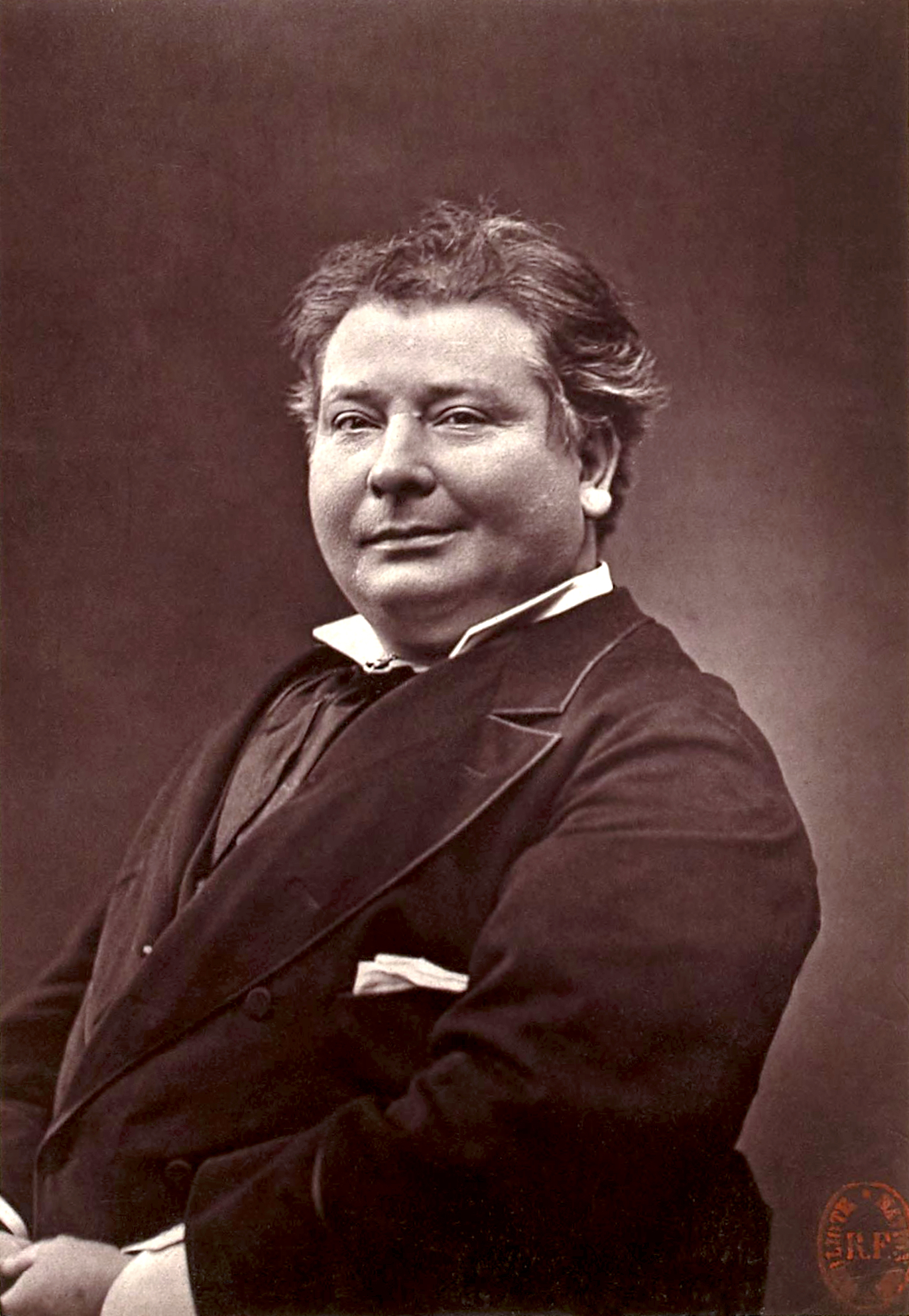
Daubray in 1876.

Michel René Thibaut, known by his stage-name Daubray, born Nantes 7 May 1837, died Paris 10 September 1892 was a leading French actor and singer in operetta, active mainly in Paris but who also appeared around Europe.

== Life and career ==
Moving to Paris when he was 14, Daubray undertook classes in speech production. When he was 19 he applied to the Paris Conservatoire but failed to gain a place. He then started a stage career as juvenile lead in smaller theatres. However, his healthy appetite soon changed his appearance to that of a small, plump comic which set the style for his career.

In 1862 he became a member of the company of the Théâtre des Champs-Élysées before joining a troupe performing in Montmartre. Moving on to the Théâtre de l'Athénée he was spotted by Offenbach who engaged him for Rabastens in Pomme d'api in 1873, followed the same year by La Cocardière in La jolie parfumeuse (which included one of his catch-phrases "C’est immense!"); these were followed by many roles at the Théâtre de la Renaissance and the Bouffes-Parisiens.

In July 1876 he travelled with some other French performers on tour to Moscow and St Petersburg, and during the summer closure of the Bouffes-Parisiens in 1877 he led part of the troupe to London.

Other operetta premieres included Le commandeur in La créole (3 November 1875), the archduke in Madame l’archiduc (1875), Coucoumella in La Sorrentine (24 March 1876) and Durand in Pierrette et Jacquot (13 October 1876). Daubray created the role of king Ouf in Chabrier’s L’etoile in 1877 and although there had been problems at rehearsals, he carried off the role with great success. This was followed by Le bailli in Babiole (16 January 1878), the title role in Maître Péronilla (13 March 1878), Galuchat in Pont d’Avignon (3 September 1878) and Boum in La Grande-Duchesse de Gérolstein (5 October 1878).

In 1879 Daubray’s demands on the management at the Bouffes led to his replacement. He therefore moved to the Théâtre du Palais-Royal, playing in Bas de laine (10 April 1879), Locataires de M Blondeau (12 June 1879), Le mari de la débutante (7 November 1879), La corbeille de noces (7 February 1880), Le Siege de Grenade (2 April 1880) and Divorçons ! (6 December 1880).

He appeared in more than 25 stage works up until 1892 – some more successful than others, but fell ill and died from a heart attack.
