= Croquefer, ou Le dernier des paladins =

Opéra bouffe by Jacques Offenbach

Jacques Offenbach by Nadar, c. 1860s

Croquefer, ou Le dernier des paladins is a one-act opéra bouffe by Jacques Offenbach to a French libretto by Adolphe Jaime and Étienne Tréfeu, first performed in 1857 in Paris. It satirizes the immorality of the Crusades and the arrogance of medieval knighthood.

== Performance history ==
The successful premiere was at the Théâtre des Bouffes-Parisiens, Rue Monsigny, Paris, on 12 February 1857, subsequently revived, and productions followed in Vienna (as Ritter Eisenfrass) in 1864 and London (as The Last of the Paladins) in 1868. The work was first performed in England on 1 July 1857 at St James's Theatre during Offenbach's second visit to London, arranged by his father-in-law John Mitchell, when the composer brought the Bouffes company including orchestra and offered 19 different pieces, 11 by him.

The authors had defied the theatrical regulation forbidding more than four characters in a stage piece at the Bouffes Parisiens theatre by adding a fifth who had no tongue and could therefore only 'sing' grunts and barks in the 'quintet'. In the Duo Offenbach mocks the Salle Le Peletier, home of the Paris Opéra, and quotes from operas by Meyerbeer, Donizetti and Halévy.

A complete performance of Croquefer forms part of the 1996 television film Offenbachs Geheimnis, directed by István Szabó, with Graham Clark and Laurence Dale among the cast. Croquefer was revived by the Compagnie Les Brigands at the Théâtre de l'Athénée as part of a double-bill with L'Île de Tulipatan in December 2012. Opera della Luna revived an English version of the piece in England in 2016.

== Roles ==
Role	Voice type	Premiere Cast, 12 February 1857 (Conductor: Jacques Offenbach)
Croquefer, an immodest and faithless knight	tenor	Étienne Pradeau
Boutefeu, his stubborn squire	tenor	Léonce
Ramasse-ta-Tête, his nephew; a spirited gentleman but bad relation	tenor	Tayau
Fleur-de-Soufre, an unfortunate princess who is resigned to become an assassin	soprano	Maréchal
Mousse-à-Mort, a dismembered knight, father of Fleur-de-Soufre; returned from Palestine	tenor	Michel
Chorus: Armed guards, vassals and child soldiers

== Synopsis ==
The scene is the platform of a half-destroyed crenellated castle tower. Beyond, the countryside, on the left a cell with a grill facing the audience; down stage a trap-door covering an entrance from the tower to the platform. A door leads to the inside of the castle.

Boutefeu, the squire of Croquefer, surveys the countryside through a telescope. Croquefer clambers out onto the platform just as he swallows his last sabre. Mousse-à-Mort, Croquefer's sworn enemy is approaching the castle with six armed men, presumably to rescue his daughter Fleur-de-Soufre whom Croquefer abducted fifteen days previously and who is languishing in a filthy cell. The 23-year war has ruined Croquefer and his castle, and he wants an end to it. Although Mousse-à-Mort has lost most of his body parts in battle (including his tongue), Croquefer is still frightened of him, and would like to make peace. Boutefeu lines up models of pretend soldiers to give the impression that Croquefer still has an army.

When Mousse-à-Mort (using signs with messages on to communicate) nevertheless defies him, Croquefer's nephew Ramasse-ta-Tête appears. Croquefer instructs him to keep guard on the daughter of Mousse-à-Mort, also offering him a choice from his drinks.

From the cell where she is kept Fleur-de-Soufre calls to Ramasse-ta-Tête and they sing a mock love duet (quoting from well-known operas of the time), and they dance and sing of running off together to the Opéra. Boutefeu and Croquefer enter and also join in with the dance.

When Mousse-à-Mort enters Croquefer presents him with two options: either Fleur-de-Soufre will marry him or she will be killed. Independently Boutefeu and Fleur-de-Soufre plot to serve poisoned wine to their adversaries. As armed men loyal to Mousse-à-Mort enter, Ramasse-ta-Tête agrees to submit, provided that he can marry Fleur-de-Soufre. She agrees. Just as Croquefer and Mousse-à-Mort are about to fight, the effects of the spiked drinks take effect, with collective diarrhoea. They both rush off-stage, to return, with Croquefer's sword and Mousse-à-Mort's tongue returned to their owners. At this point Boutefeu presents on a silver platter a letter just delivered: Croquefer begs the indulgence of the audience; the composer and his librettist of the piece are being taken off to Charenton.

== Musical numbers ==
- Overture
- Ballade « Mon château qu'il est chic ! »
- Trio « Oui, c'est moi comme Mars en Carême »
- Duo « Comment c'est vous, un gentilhomme ! »
- Galop
- Chanson à boire « A vos santés je bois »
- Marche
- Quintet « O ciel ! o ciel ! »
- Final « O vous tous qui m'écoutez »
