= Jean de Nivelle (opera) =

French opera named for Jean de Nivelle

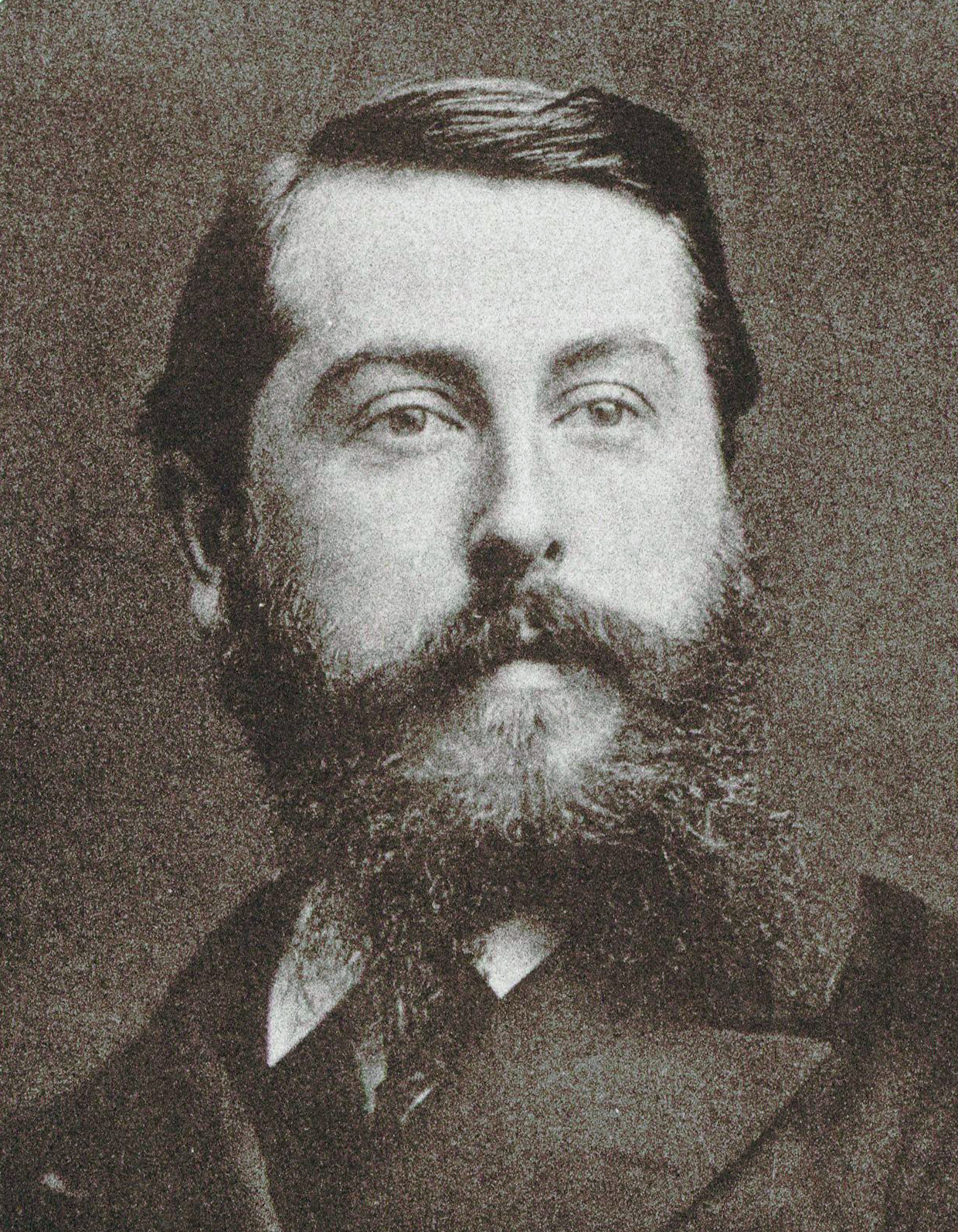
Léo Delibes

Jean de Nivelle is an opera in three acts by Léo Delibes to a French libretto by Edmond Gondinet and Philippe Gille. It premiered on 6 March 1880 at the Opéra-Comique in Paris, with Jean-Alexandre Talazac, a French tenor, in the title role. The story is based on the historical figure Jean de Nivelle, a member of the House of Montmorency who refused to join with his father, Jean II de Montmorency, in supporting Louis XI in his war against Charles the Bold.

Although originally described as an opéra comique, in many respects it is close to the grand opera tradition typified by Meyerbeer. The opera proved popular in its day, with 100 performances in the year following its premiere. Between 1881 and 1882, it was also performed at La Monnaie in Brussels, Saint Petersburg, Copenhagen, Budapest, Vienna, and Stockholm. Then, it disappeared from the repertoire and was only revived in Paris in 1908, at the Théâtre Municipal de la Gaîté-Lyrique. In the 1908 revival the role of Arlette was sung by Marianne Nicot, the daughter of the creator of the role, while the title role was sung by David Devriès.

Franz Liszt in 1881, in his late sparse style, began to compose a free fantasy on the orchestral introduction to the opera, followed by the introduction to the ballad itself. But the manuscript is incomplete and unfinished. It is numbered S698 in Liszt's catalogue of works, and is the only operatic fantasy Liszt contemplated on themes by Delibes.

== Roles ==
Role	Voice type	Premiere cast, 9 March 1880 (Conductor: Jules Danbé)
Jean de Nivelle	tenor	Talazac
Le comte de Charolais	baritone	Taskin
Arlette	soprano	Bilbaut-Vauchelet
Simone	mezzo-soprano	Engally
Diane de Beautreillis	dugazon	Mirane
Le page Isolin	dugazon	Dalbret
Saladin d’Anglure	bass	Maris
Le sire de Malicorne	tenor comique	Grivot
Le baron de Beautreillis	bass	Gourdon
Un vieillard	bass	Étienne Troy
Chorus: grape-pickers, lords, pages, guards.

== Synopsis ==
After an orchestral prelude the action opens in the Burgundian country, early in the reign of Louis XI. The curtain rises on grape-pickers who look vexedly after a young shepherd who goes away without replying to their calls: it is Jean de Nivelle – not long in the region having come from an unknown place. Wild and mysterious, he slips away as soon as someone thinks they know who he is. This excites the curiosity of the old hag Simone. She is consumed with jealousy and anger for her son Thibaut, a bad lad in prison for theft, whom she wants to marry her niece Arlette, but the latter hates Thibaut, and has fallen in love with Jean. Arlette herself suspects that the handsome shepherd might be the Duke Jean de Montmorency, who fled the royal court to avoid a futile marriage and who is hiding himself from the king in the depths of the countryside. When the Count de Charolais and Diane de Beautreillis pass on a hunt they fail to recognize Jean. Sire Malicorne (a comic character) has also been sent from court to find and drag back the missing son-in-law. The Baron Beautreillis, another comic role, the duke’s minister, uses the presence of the king's envoy to advance his own interests, while Saladin, a friend of Count Charolais is angry with Jean for stealing his riding-crop.

In the second act, at the court of Philippe le Bon, Isolin leads the festivities. Diane presents Arlette, who pleases the old duke and has managed to reconcile him with his son. Arlette sings a florid fabliau. Saladin lays a trap for Arlette to seduce her and destroy her good favour when she tries to meet Jean. Jean appears just as Saladin lays in wait for her and the two draw swords. Jean later accuses Arlette of having an assignation with Saladin and admits that he has killed him. Denounced and revealed as his real self by Simone, when Charolais condemns him, Malicorne intervenes that the king has already sentenced Jean for rebellion. At this Charolais frees Jean and asks him to command the Burgundian troops against the king.

For the third act it is daybreak on the Montlhéry plain with the battle in the distance. Arlette is looking for Jean, while Charolais, injured, says that he was rescued from a fatal ambush by an unknown soldier (who we know was Jean). Then Jean enters, pale, and without his arms: before the flag of France he had lost his courage. However, Arlette comes to him and tells him that Simone is still, along with Malicorne, plotting to ruin him. Jean does not listen to her, but then Charolais returns having parleyed with the king who has pardoned Jean, who decides that rather than face the French forces again, he will go away, but with Arlette.
