= Jardin Nelson-Mandela =

Urban park in Paris

Coordinates: 48.8625°N 2.3446°E

View from above of the Jardin Nelson Mandela

The Jardin Nelson-Mandela (formerly Jardin des Halles) is a garden of approximately 4 hectares in the 1st arrondissement of Paris.

== History ==
The Jardin Nelson Mandela was created in the 1980s on the former Parisian market halls location and is therefore actually located on the roof of the Forum des Halles, a shopping center. It consists of lawns, trees, and hedges. The park includes a children's playground and open spaces. Opposite the entrance to the market halls and the metro (Rue Pierre Lescot) is the stock exchange, and to the north, the towers of the Église Saint-Eustache can be seen.

== Origin of the name ==
When Nelson Mandela died on December 5, 2013, the Mayor of Paris, Bertrand Delanoë, proposed to rename the Jardin des Halles the Jardin Nelson Mandela. His proposal was accepted by the Council of Paris. The official inauguration took place on December 19, 2013.
