= Laurence Grivot =

French opera singer

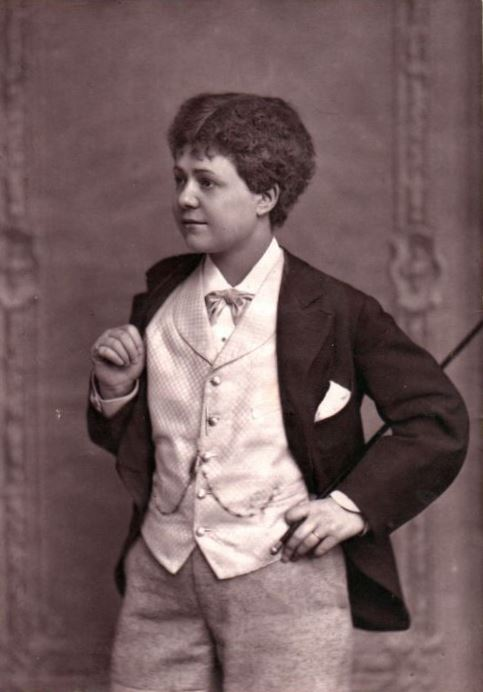
Laurence Grivot

Laurence Grivot (born Marie Laurent, 29 April 1843, Versailles – died 4 June 1890, Thomery) was a French operetta singer and actress. She was the wife of Pierre Grivot.

== Life and career ==
She made her debut at the Théâtre des Batignolles in Le Petit Nicol by Alfred Séguin in 1863 and was then engaged (under the name "Mlle Laurence") at the Vaudeville as Nicette in La Chercheuse d'esprit by Charles-Simon Favart, where she met Pierre Grivot whom she married in 1866. Grivot played in many pieces alongside her husband such as Jobin et Nanette, Horace et Litine, La Famille Benoîton by Victorien Sardou) until her husband left in 1868 to join the Théâtre de la Gaîté.

She continued with successes in Les Brebis galeuses and Les Faux Bonshommes by Théodore Barrière, La Dame aux camélias by Alexandre Dumas fils, Le Sacrifice by Alphonse Daudet, and Le Mariage de Figaro by Beaumarchais. At the advent of the Paris Commune in 1871, she joined her husband to run the Gaîté theatre, with performances of La Grâce de Dieu. The couple toured the French provinces and as far as Cairo (the 1872-73 season).

Back in France she became a regular creator of roles (often travesty) for Jacques Offenbach with La permission de dix heures and La jolie parfumeuse at the Théâtre de la Renaissance in 1873 then Bagatelle and Madame l'archiduc at the Théâtre des Bouffes-Parisiens in 1874 then, after a serious illness, returning to the stage for a revival of La Vie parisienne at the Variétés in 1877.

Moving to straight theatre, Grivot joined the Théâtre de l'Odéon company in 1880 and immediately had great success in Les Parents d'Alice, following this with others plays, before moving to the Théâtre du Gymnase in 1883. Taken ill during a performance of Paris fin de siècle by Ernest Blum and Raoul Toché at the Gymnase in 1890 she was forced to retire and died, aged 47, later that year.
