= La bonne d'enfant =

Opérette bouffe by Jacques Offenbach

Jacques Offenbach by Nadar, c. 1860s

La bonne d'enfant (The Nanny) is an opérette bouffe, in one act by Jacques Offenbach to a French libretto by Eugène Bercioux.

It was first performed at the Théâtre des Bouffes Parisiens, Paris on 14 October 1856. Offenbach's early operettas were small-scale one-act works, since the law in France limited musical theatre works (other than grand opera) to one-act pieces with no more than three singers and, perhaps, some mute characters. In 1858, this law was changed, and Offenbach was able to offer full-length operettas, beginning with Orpheus in the Underworld.

The piece was seen in 1857 at the St James's Theatre in London, and in Vienna in 1862 with Tostée as Dorothée; it was subsequently produced there in Hungarian.

== Roles ==
Role	Voice type	Premiere Cast, October 14, 1856 (Conductor: Jacques Offenbach)
Dorothée, a nanny	soprano	Garnier
Gargaillou, a chimney sweep	tenor	Michel
Mitouflard, a fireman	bass	Dubouchet
Bourgeois		Delaquis

== Synopsis ==
Dorothée is tired of being a nanny and wants to marry to become the mistress of her own house. She has two suitors: Mitouflard, the fireman and Gargaillou, the chimneysweep. During an evening when her employers are out of the house, both gentlemen try to convince her to marry them, which leads to a number of comic situations. She ends up deciding to marry 'Brin d'Amour', the trumpeter of the Royal Dragoons, but tells her suitors that she will invite them to her wedding.
