= Le violoneux =

One-act operetta by Jacques Offenbach

Jacques Offenbach by Nadar, c. 1860s

Le violoneux is a one-act operetta (« légende bretonne » - Breton legend) by Jacques Offenbach to a French libretto by Eugène Mestépès and Émile Chevalet, first performed in 1855.

== Performance history ==
The triumphant premiere was at the Théâtre des Bouffes Parisiens in the Champs-Elysées, Paris, on 31 August 1855, making a star of Schneider in her first role for Offenbach, to whom she had been introduced by Berthelier (with whom she was having an affair).

Le violoneux was part of a command performance given in April 1860 for the Emperor at the Théâtre-Italien, along with Orphée aux enfers and Le musicien de l’avenir. Offenbach went to Vienna in 1861 to conduct performances of Le mariage aux lanternes and Le violoneux at the Theater am Franz-Josefs-Kai.

H. B. Farnie adapted the opera into English as Breaking the Spell, which premiered at the Lyceum Theatre, London on 2 May 1870 and was revived in London in 1891 and 1904. It was played on tour for five months in 1878 by the D'Oyly Carte Opera Company as a curtain raiser to The Sorcerer by Gilbert and Sullivan.

The Opéra-Comique in Paris staged the work in 1901 with Jeanne Tiphaine as Reinette, Lucien Fugère as Père Mathieu and Ernest Carbonne as Pierre.

== Roles ==
Role	Voice type	Premiere Cast, 31 August 1855 (Conductor: Jacques Offenbach)
Père Mathieu, village fiddler	baritone	Darcier
Pierre, clog-maker	tenor	Jean-François Berthelier
Reinette, god-child of Père Mathieu	soprano	Hortense Schneider

== Synopsis ==
The scene is a village square in Brittany.

Reinette asks Père Mathieu to help Pierre who is terrified as he has been conscripted in the army and can only get out of it if he pays 2,000 francs. His uncle has refused to help him with the money and sent him packing. Pierre is not happy when his sweetheart Reinette suggests approaching Mathieu, the village fiddler for he believes him to be a magician. Père Mathieu inherited the violin from his father along with the mysterious command to break the instrument in pieces if ever Mathieu is in an emergency, which he has yet to do. When Mathieu plays a song he bewitches Pierre; who when it is over runs off. Alone with Mathieu, Reinette threatens to run after Pierre and become a cantinière.

Alone, Reinette embraces the old fiddle – the livelihood of her guardian. Pierre catches her doing this and angrily smashes the instrument. Among the broken pieces, it reveals its mystery: a letter, from Reinette's father stating that Mathieu is the rightful owner of the castle of Kerdrel. Matthieu offers the money for Pierre to avoid conscription and marry Reinette and tears up the letter. Pierre offers to repair the violin, and Mathieu says he will remain a poor fiddler.

== Musical numbers ==
- Overture
- Couplets « Conscrit! Conscrit! »
- Couplets et Duo « J’sais bien que c’n’est pas l’usage »
- Ronde « Le violoneux du village »
- Duo « Le clairon sonne à la parade »
- Duo « Qué qu’ je vois !... »
- Couplets « Je t’apportais ta délivrance »
- Melodrame et Final « Tout petit dans ce village »
