= Une demoiselle en loterie =

Opérette bouffe by Jacques Offenbach

Jacques Offenbach by Nadar, c. 1860s

Une demoiselle en loterie is a one-act opérette bouffe of 1857 with music by Jacques Offenbach. The French libretto was by Adolphe Jaime and Hector Crémieux.

== Performance history ==
The premiere of Une demoiselle en loterie took place on 27 July 1857 at the Bouffes-Parisiens (Salle Lacaze), Paris, on the same bill as a new production of an 1855 one-act work, La Momie de Roscoco by Eugène Ortolan, words by Émile de Najac.

It was later performed at a café-concert in Brussels in July 1858 by Offenbach's company in Bad Ems in August 1858 and was adapted for Vienna in 1862 and 1864.

== Roles ==
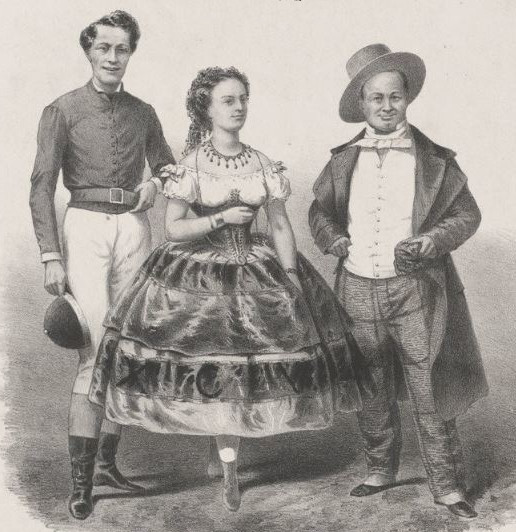
Pierre Mesmacre, Lise Tautin and Désiré in costumes of Une demoiselle en loterie

Roles, voice types, premiere cast
Role	Voice type	Premiere cast, 27 July 1857 Conductor: Jacques Offenbach
Aspasie	soprano	Lise Tautin
Anténor Pigeonneau	baritone	Désiré
Démêloir	tenor	Pierre Mesmacre

== Synopsis ==
Démêloir has been trying for a fortnight to sell 200 lottery tickets at 1,000 francs each, walking back and forth from the Madeleine to the Bastille. The prize is the hand of the former horse dancer Aspasie, who will use the proceeds as her dowry. A letter arrives from Anténor Pigeonneau, widowed former goose farmer, asking them to postpone the draw while he arrives from Périgord. Aspasie believes Pigeonneau is a relation. He enters and wants only the ticket number 100, because a goose predicted that it would win. Aspasie claims that the Count Arthur de Blago Colonera Cardinos, who arrived directly by train from Cuba, has already bought ticket number 100. In order to force matters, Démêloir disguises himself as the Spanish rival. Aspasie sings a Chanson Bohémienne. Pigeonneau offers all his fortune – 86,000 francs, gained from investing their aunt's fortune in geese, and the opera ends with Démêloir revealing that he is Aspasie's servant, and the marriage of Aspasie and Pigeonneau.

== Musical numbers ==
- Overture
- Rondo and duet "Voici les billets" (Démêloir)
- Couplets "Monsieur j'arrive en diligence" (Pigeonneau)
- Trio "C'est elle! C'est lui!" (Pigeonneau, Aspasie, Démêloir)
- Duet "Va toujours, ma reine charmante" (Pigeonneau, Aspasie)
- Chanson bohémienne "Ecoutez cette chanson là" (Aspasie)
- Finale "Eh! Quoi vous seriez" (All)
