= Pierre Faubert =

Haitian poet and playwright

Pierre Faubert (1806 – 31 July 1868) was a Haitian poet and playwright. Faubert was born in Cayes to a general of the Haitian Revolution. Educated in France, Faubert returned to Haiti and served as Secretary to President Jean-Pierre Boyer. Faubert later was chosen by President Fabre Geffrard to negotiate the concordat between Haiti and the Pope. As a writer, two of Faubert's most notable works were a collection of poems titled Poésies Fugitives and a drama titled Ogé ou le Préjugé de Couleur. He died at Vanves, near Paris, France.
