= La jolie parfumeuse =

1873 opéra comique by Jacques Offenbach

Jacques Offenbach by Nadar, c. 1860s

La jolie parfumeuse (French pronunciation: [la ʒɔli paʁfymøz]) is an opéra comique in three acts of 1873 with music by Jacques Offenbach. The French libretto was by Hector Crémieux and Ernest Blum.

== Performance history ==
The opera was premiered at the Théâtre de la Renaissance, Paris on 29 November 1873, where it ran for 200 performances, marking Offenbach's first major success after the fall of the Empire. The piece, which owes something to the 1850 opéra comique Les Porcherons by Sauvage and Grisar, enjoys a "farcical libretto of sexual quiproquos".

The piece, written in seven weeks, derived much of its success from the performance of Théo in the title role; she returned, along with Daubray, for a revival in 1875 at the Théâtre des Bouffes Parisiens. The work was successfully revived again in 1892 at the Théâtre de la Renaissance (with Juliette Simon-Girard as Rose and Simon-Max as Poirot) and in 1898 at the Théâtre de la Gaîté with Mariette Sully.

It was seen at the Alhambra in London from 18 May 1874 with Kate Santley, bowdlerized, as the libretto was « inadmissible in an English theatre ».

Outside France, La jolie parfumeuse was also produced (often in translation) in Brussels, Antwerp and Vienna in 1874, Berlin, New York, Birmingham and Milan in 1875, Mexico in 1876 and Stockholm in 1891, but did not remain in the repertory during the 20th century, despite broadcasts on French radio and a run at the Royal Academy of Music in 1973. The Neighbor's Chorus "Soyez donc bon homme" at the opening of act 3 remains a favorite of choral societies, however.

== Roles ==
Role	Voice type	Premiere cast, 29 November 1873 (Conductor: Jacques Offenbach)
Rose Michon	soprano	Louise Théo
Bavolet	soprano	Laurence Grivot
Clorinde	soprano	Fonti
La Julienne	mezzo-soprano	Pauline Lyon
Arthémise	soprano	Castello
Madelon	soprano	Jane Eyre
Justine	soprano	Guiotti
Lise	soprano	Godin
Mirette	soprano	E Alboudy
Poirot	tenor	Bonnet
La Cocardière	baritone	Daubray
Germain	baritone	Étienne Troy
Premier Garçon		Cosmes
Deuxième Garçon		P Albert
Four blind musicians "Trombone, Violon, Grosse Caisse, Clarinette"		Gaillard, Allard, Hardon, Derain
Four maidservants		Anna, E Nœll, Jouvenceau, Mangin
Two bridesmaids		R Capet, Debrat
Waiters, people at the cabaret; customers, neighbours, grisettes, barbers, clerks.

== Synopsis ==
Setting: Paris, 18th century

=== Act 1 ===
The first act is set in a garden cabaret of Les Porcherons, with a band stand and a sign which reads ‘Noces et Festins, Salon de 100 Couverts’. In the background, shrubs and the entrance.

Bavolet, a young clerk who works for the public prosecutor, and god-son of the rich financier La Cocardière, is to marry Rose, who works at the perfume-shop (and bears a striking resemblance to a new member of the ballet recently arrived from Toulouse). The wedding celebrations are in full swing at the Cabaret des Porcherons. Clorinde (a mistress of La Cocardière) is there with her dancer friends. When La Cocardière arrives at the celebration she teases him as it is clear he is taken with the perfume girl, Rose. He wriggles out of the situation and all toast the young couple. Also present is Poirot (in reality a Swiss worker at the Hotel Saint-Florentin – although from Nogent). He and La Cocardière scheme to get hold of the bride's garter. Bavolet tells Rose that he is keeping the place of their wedding night a secret until later.

La Cocardière announces a band of blind musicians, and Verrouillaski, the ‘famous Polish painter’ (Poirot in disguise). They persuade Rose to stand on a table to have her portrait painted, during which La Cocardière gets hold of the garter. After another dance all prepare to depart. Bavolet explains to La Cocardière that as he does not want Rose to live in the little room above her shop, he has rented a room adjacent and made a door to join them both. He also asks La Cocardière if he will conduct his wife to the new home, and en route recount to her what her mother would have said to her on her wedding night if she had been alive. After a final dance, La Cocardière leads away Rose to whom Bavolet, surrounded by Poirot and his friends, waves kisses.

=== Act 2 ===
A salon in La Cocardière’s house with several doors leading off, and see-through mirrors making visible the interior of the two adjoining rooms.

Germain, La Cocardière's manservant, sings of the pleasant life he leads, and with Justine, Lise and other domestic servants sets the table for a meal. La Cocardière and Rose enter, he assuring her that (despite the lavish furnishings) this is her new home – all paid for by Bavolet. Among the decorations she notices pictures of ballet dancers – including the new arrival from Toulouse. To fulfil his commission La Cocardière attempts to kiss and embrace Rose, eventually blowing out the candles, but she evades him. He calls the maids to prepare Rose for bed, although she is ticklish. La Cocardière re-enters pretending to be Bavolet, but his big hands, ears and teeth make her feel like little red riding-hood.

Germain suddenly comes in to announce the arrival of Clorinde and her friends. La Cocardière hides Rose. Clorinde sings him a birthday song, but he is not pleased by the surprise visit nor the suggestion of a birthday supper. As La Cocardière tries to get rid of Rose and deal with the dancers, Bavolet and Poirot burst in. Having been to Bavolet's rooms the young husband wants to know where his wife is, thinking she might have been taken ill en route or had an accident. Realising there is another woman in one of the adjoining rooms, he demands to know who it is. Bavolet rushes to open the door and Rose, beautifully dressed, emerges announcing herself as "Dorothée Bruscambille, native of Toulouse, and future pensionnaire of the Grand Opéra of Paris". Despite all Bavolet's questions she insists (in a Toulouse accent) that she is not Rose.

The others leave Bavolet and Rose alone and she tempts him with champagne, after they too disappear into a side room. As the act ends, other come back in, Rose and Bavolet can be seen in the room on the right, while in the left-hand room are Clorinde and La Cocardière. Poirot is on his knees in front of Arthémise.

=== Act 3 ===
The interior of the perfume shop with a counter and on the right a staircase leading to the first floor.

The curtain rises on an empty shop, but people are rattling the shutters demanding entrance. La Julienne, women customers, grisettes, barbers, clerks crowd into the shop. Poirot says that he will be an honourable man and marry ‘Bruscambille’ and sings his letter to the parents of the girl; Bavolet, somewhat hung-over, and thinking that he had been with the dancer, and that Rose had only come in at seven that morning, is mystified. As Poirot prepares to go and deliver his letter, Rose enters. Bavolet rushes to her but she silences him with her look.

After some plotting by Clorinde and Rose, La Cocardière enters the shop and while Rose tries to serve customers he tries to declare his love. Bavolet now confronts Rose but she refuses to answer him and he storms out. Rose now confronts La Cocardière, but when Clorinde comes in he hides in a cupboard. Rose asks what she can get for Clorinde who replies that she wants her partner and proceeds to search all the rooms of the shop for La Cocardière. La Julienne arrives hurriedly and says that a man – Bavolet – is going to throw himself in the Seine, but as Rose decides to go and find him Bavolet himself passes by and demands from the doorway where Rose spent the night. She replies in her false Toulouse accent and all becomes clear. La Cocardière is found hiding in the cupboard; Clorinde shows a ring and claims to be his wife. With a reprise of the first act finale all ends happily.
