= Auguste Pittaud de Forges =

French playwright (1803–1881)

- Born: Philippe-Auguste-Alfred Pittaud; 5 April 1803; Former 2nd arrondissement of Paris, France
- Died: 28 September 1881 (aged 78); Saint-Gratien, France
- Other name: Paul de Lussan
- Occupation: Playwright

Auguste Pittaud de Forges (5 April 1803 (15 germinal an XI) – 28 September 1881) was a 19th-century French playwright.

== Biography ==
His full name was Philippe-Auguste-Alfred Pittaud. He began his literary career under the pseudonyms Deforges, de Forge or Desforges. In 1861, he was authorized by imperial decree to officially join to his family name that of de Forges, He also used the pen name Paul de Lussan.

He wrote many vaudevilles in collaboration with Adolphe de Leuven, Emmanuel Théaulon, Jean-François Bayard, Louis-Émile Vanderburch, Clairville, Adrien Robert, as well as librettos of several opéras comiques and operettas for Jacques Offenbach such as L'alcôve, an opéra comique in one act (1847), Luc et Lucette, opéra comique in one act (1854), Paimpol et Périnette, a saynète in one act (1855), Le 66, operetta in one act (1856), Les vivandières de la grande-armée, an operetta bouffa in one act (1859), Fleurette, oder Trompeter und Näherin (composed as Fleurette c. 1863), an opéra comique in one act (1872), Adolphe Adam (Le Bijou perdu, 1853; Les Pantins de Violette, 1856), Friedrich von Flotow (La veuve Grapin (revised in 1861 as Madame Bonjour)), etc.

Knighted on 5 June 1850, he was named an officer of the Legion of Honour on 12 August 1862. He was also a commander of the Order of St. Gregory the Great (Vatican), commander of the Order of Isabella the Catholic (Spain), officer in the Order of Léopold (Belgium) and knight of the Order of Saints Maurice and Lazarus (Italy)

== Iconography ==
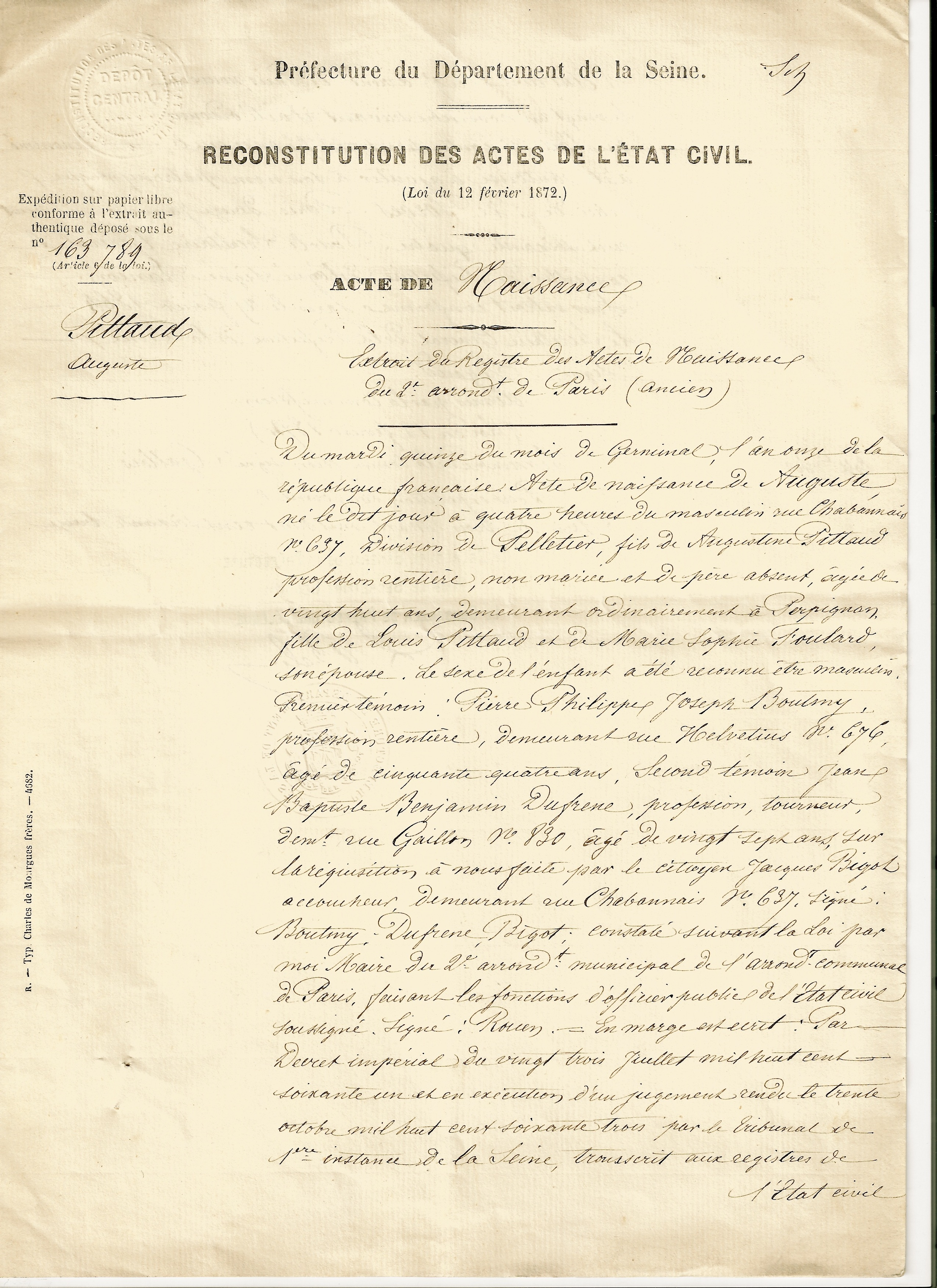
Reconstituted birth certificate (recto)

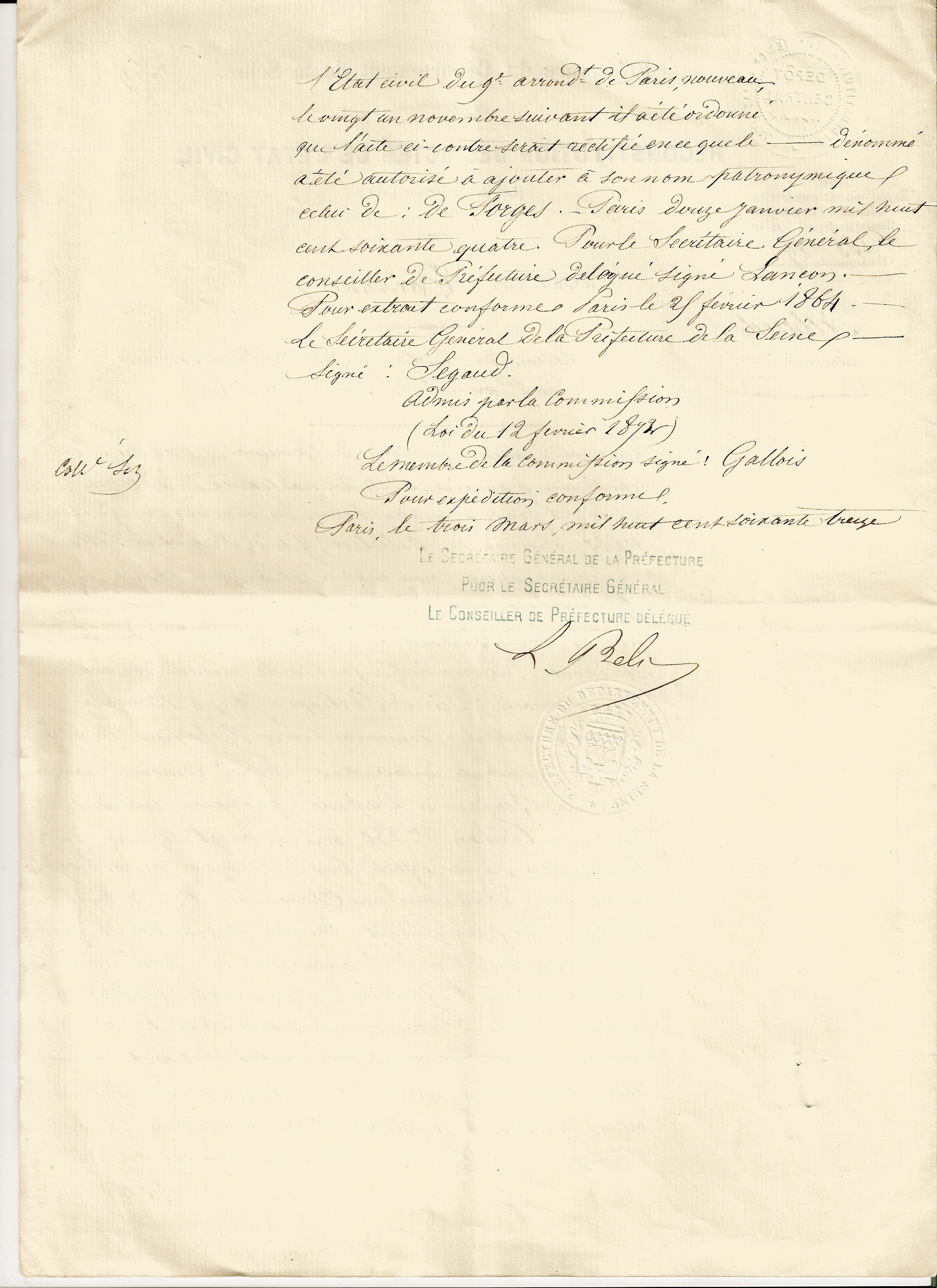
Reconstituted birth certificate (verso)

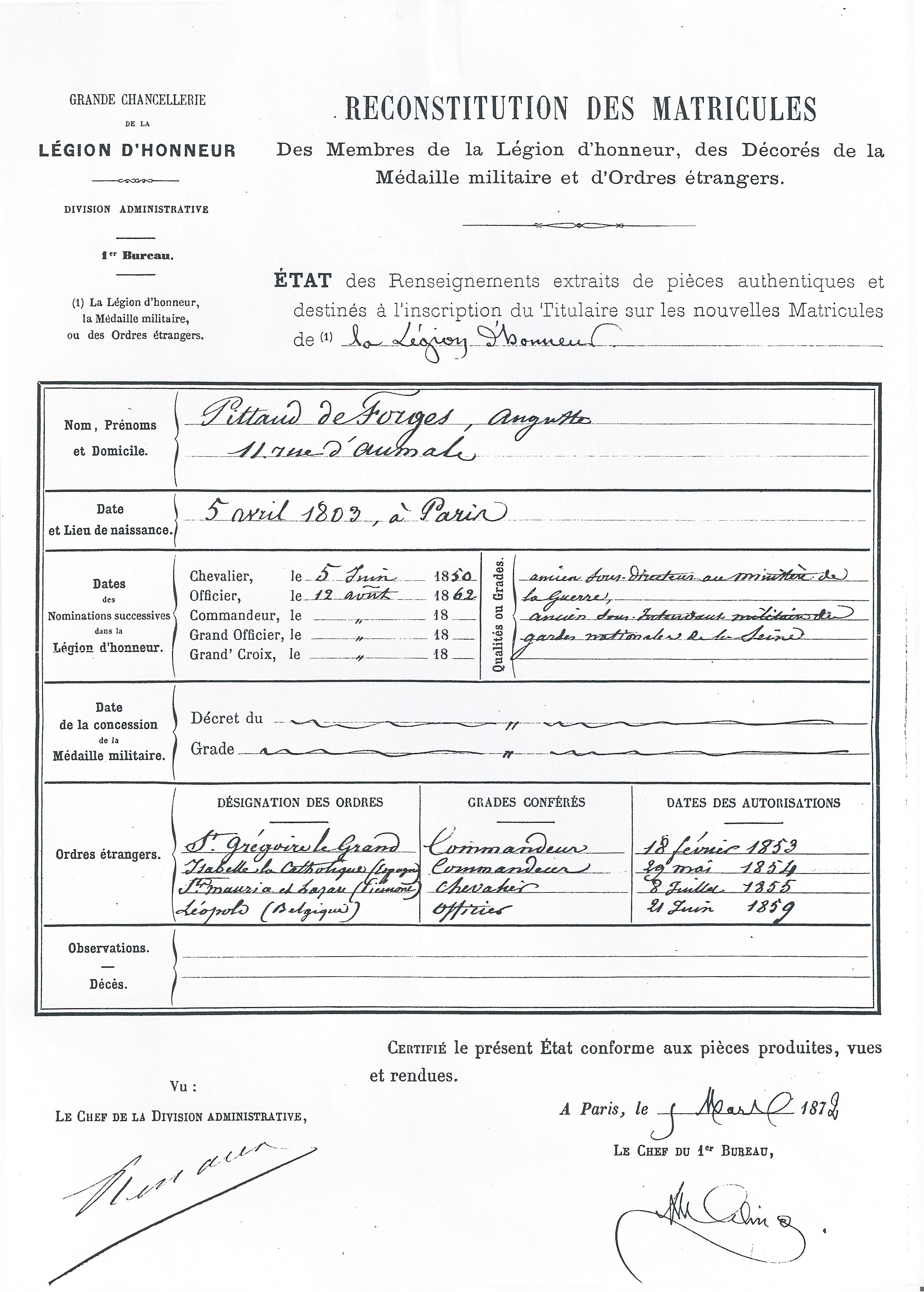
Acte reconstitutif des distinctions

== Bibliography ==
- Louis Gustave Vapereau, « Deforges (Philippe-Auguste Pittaud) », Dictionnaire universel des littératures, Paris, Hachette, 1876, (p. 497-p–98), at Gallica

== See also ==
- List of French writers
- List of playwrights
