= La permission de dix heures =

One act opéra comique

Jacques Offenbach by Nadar, c. 1860s

La permission de dix heures is an opéra comique in one act, composed in 1867 by Jacques Offenbach. The French libretto, by Mélesville and Pierre Carmouche, was arranged by Nuitter with the agreement of Carmouche from the comédie-vaudeville by the same authors, first performed at the Théâtre du Palais-Royal on 17 April 1841. Offenbach's opéra comique premiered in Bad Ems, Germany, and had a Paris production but did not enter the repertoire.

== Performance history ==
Originally planned for 1866, the premiere of La permission de dix heures was in Bad Ems on 9 July 1867. It received its French premiere at the Théâtre de la Renaissance on 4 September 1873 where it ran for 39 performances.

A production was mounted at the Carltheater in Vienna as Urlaub nach Zapfenstreich (Leave after Curfew) in February 1868, and the work was later seen in Budapest in June 1871 as Takarodó után (After Curfew).

== Roles ==
Roles, voice types, premiere cast
Role	Voice type	Premiere cast, Bad Ems, 9 July 1867	Paris cast, 4 September 1873 Conductor: Charles Constantin
Larose Pompon, soldier in the French army	baritone	Grillon	Falchieri
Lanternick, sergeant in the same regiment	trial	Gourdon	Bonnet
Le Père Brousaille, garde-champêtre	trial		Caliste
Un caporal	trial		A Mertz
Madame Jobin, widow	soprano	Colas	Anna Dartaux
Nicole, her niece	soprano	Marie Lemoine	Laurence Grivot
Chorus : French soldiers, a waiter, a servant

== Synopsis ==
Set in France in the 18th century, in front of the inn 'Au Coeur Volant'

The overture sets the military tone.

The soldier Larose Pompon meets briefly with Nicole with whom he is engaged. Nicole’s aunt, the rich Madame Jobin, has forbidden Nicole to wed until she has herself remarried. Larose wonders whom he can find for Madame Jobin, and the lovers plan to meet again at nine o’clock that evening. Sergeant Lanternick, an honest Alsatian, enters; Larose reckons that he could be the solution.

Feigning drunkness, Larose approaches Jobin’s house to allow Lanternick to rescue the ladies from his intrusion, but the Alsatian is too awkward to press his suit and declines an invitation to supper on the pretext of not having a ten-hour leave pass.

Nicole gives her aunt Larose's name as that of the admirer, and Madame Jobin, who knows the colonel of the regiment, is determined to obtain a permission on his behalf. When Lanternick returns, Nicole tries to awaken his feelings for Jobin, but Lanternick thinks it is she who likes him.

Larose gets his sergeant to write a letter for Nicole but which he will pass to Madame Jobin. The retraite sounds. Although only one of the soldiers has a ten-hour leave pass, they both arrive for the assignation. In the darkness, Larose, affecting an Alsatian accent, asks Madame Jobin to take a walk with him.

When the suspicious Broussaille comes on patrol he encounters the two pairs: Larose with Jobin, Nicole with Lanternick. In the confusion each soldier woos the wrong woman, and a kissing quartet ensues. In the confusion, Lanternick is discovered kneeling in front of Madame Jobin, and thus agrees to wed the rich widow – for the happiness of Nicole and Larose.

== Musical numbers ==
- Overture
- Aria "Faut lui trouver un garçon" (Larose)
- Couplets "Faut que j’fasse un p’tit gonnaissance" (Lanternick)
- Trio and quartet "Chacun son écot"
- Couplets "La permission de dix heures"
- Couplets "Allons! Ne vous désolez pas" (Nicole)
- Retreat trio "Larose, entends tu la retraite?"
- Couplets "A cette démarche légère" (Mme Jobin)
- Ensemble "Ah! Quelle douce ivresse"
- Finale "La permission de dix heures"
