= Adolphe Jaime =

French vaudevillist and librettist

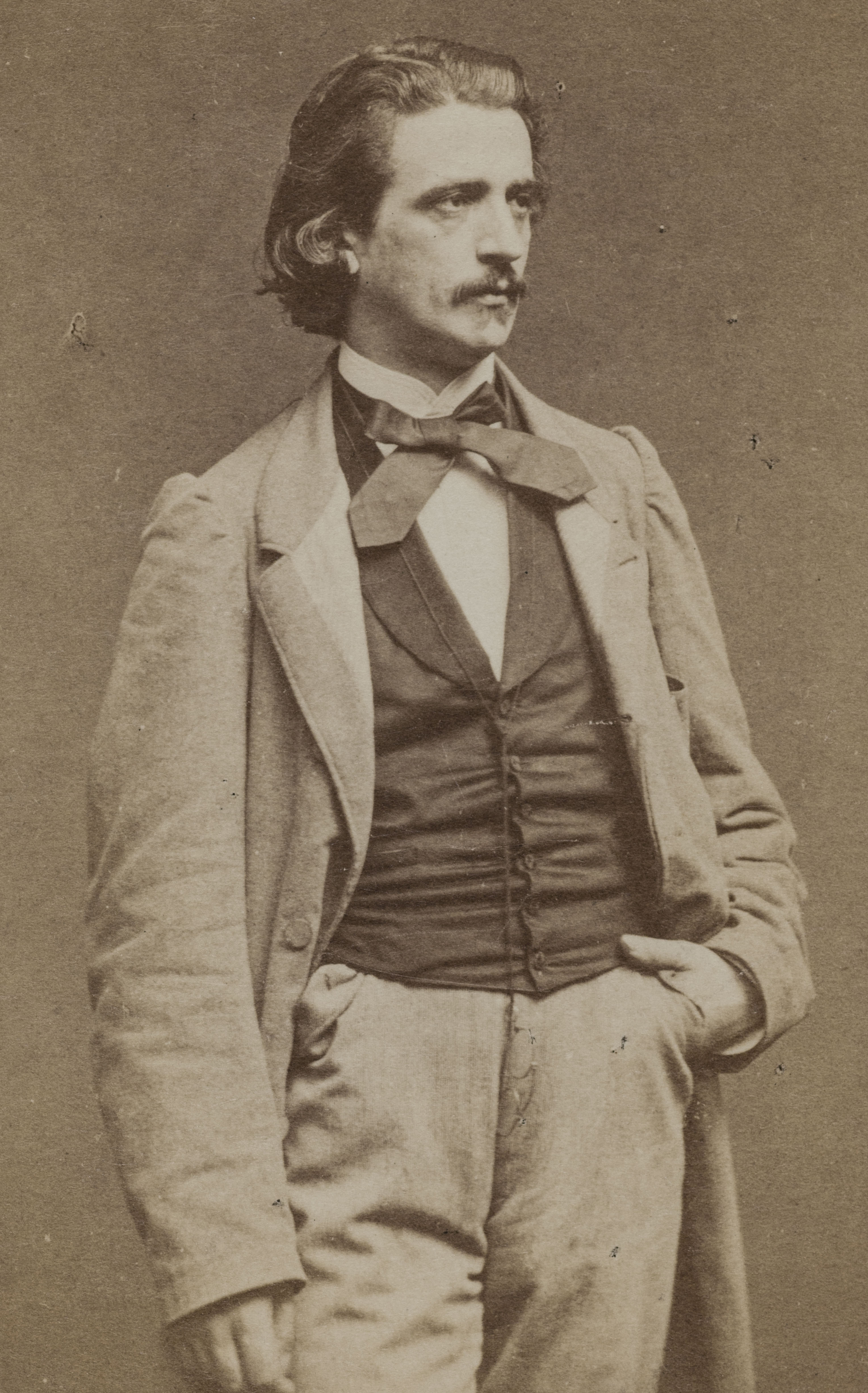
Image of Adolphe Jaime

Adolphe Jaime, called Jaime fils, (1825 in Paris – 1901 in Asnières-sur-Seine) was a 19th-century French vaudevillist and librettist. He was the son of Ernest Jaime (1804–1884), also a playwright.

== Works ==
- 1845: Le Diable à quatre, vaudeville in 3 acts by Adolphe Jaime and Michel Delaporte
- 1856: Les Vivandières de la grande-armée, opérette bouffe in one act, music by Jacques Offenbach
- 1856: Lucie Didier, by Léon Battu, Théâtre du Vaudeville, 12 January
- 1857: Croquefer, ou Le dernier des paladins, opéra bouffe in one act, music by Jacques Offenbach, libretto by Étienne Tréfeu and Jaime fils
- 1857: Maître Griffard, opéra comique by Léo Delibes, 3 October
- 1857: Dragonette, opéra bouffe in one act with Eugène Mestépès, music by Jacques Offenbach
- 1857: Une demoiselle en loterie, one-act opérette, music by Jacques Offenbach,
- 1859: Geneviève de Brabant, opéra-bouffon in 2 acts, music by Jacques Offenbach, libretto by Étienne Tréfeu and Jaime fils
- 1867: La Bonne aux camélias, comédie en vaudevilles in one act, by Hector Crémieux and Jaime, Théâtre des Bouffes-Parisiens, 6 September
- 1868: Cent mille francs and ma fille
- 1869: Le petit Faust, music by Hervé
- 1869: Les Turcs (1869) - music by Hervé
- 1869: L'Écossais de Chatou, operetta, music by Léo Delibes, 16 January
- 1871: Le barbier de Trouville, bluette bouffe in one act, music by Charles Lecocq, 19 November
- 1871: Le trône d'Écosse, with Hector-Jonathan Crémieux
- 1873: La Branche cassée, three-act operetta, music by Gaston Serpette
- 1873: Le mouton enragé, one-act, music by Paul Lacôme
