= Hector-Jonathan Crémieux =

French librettist and playwright

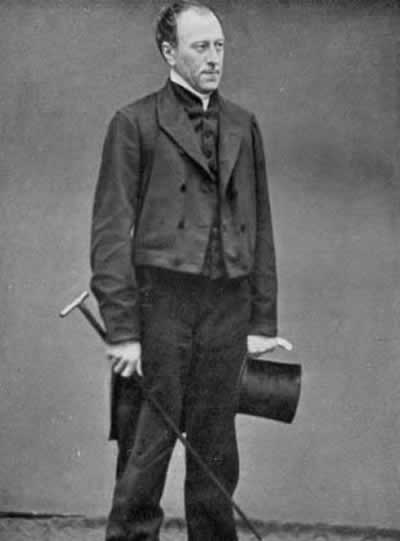
Hector Crémieux

Hector-Jonathan Crémieux (10 November 1828 – 30 September 1893) was a French librettist and playwright. His best-known work is his collaboration with Ludovic Halévy for Jacques Offenbach's Orphée aux Enfers, known in English as Orpheus in the Underworld.

In 1887, Crémieux became the secretary-general of the bank Société des Dépôts et Comptes Courants, and ceased writing. In April 1891, the bank collapsed and it was subsequently absorbed in 1892 by the Comptoir national d'escompte de Paris. In 1893, Crémieux committed suicide by gunshot.

== Life ==
Crémieux was born in Paris to a Jewish family - he was related to the lawyer Adolphe Crémieux . He studied law and then worked in the civil service. His first play, Fiesque (1852) was a historical drama, but before long he started to write comedies and then, in collaboration, operetta and opéra comique librettos. His collaborations with Halévy were often written under the joint pseudonym Paul d'Arcy.

In 1887, Crémieux became secretary-general of the Société des Dépôts et Comptes Courants, and ceased writing. Five years later, the Société collapsed and he committed suicide by gunshot in Paris.

== Libretti ==
=== For Jacques Offenbach ===
Playbill for a revival of Orpheus in the Underworld

- Le savetier et le financier (1856) - with E About
- Une demoiselle en loterie (1857) - with Louis-Adolphe Jaime
- Orphée aux enfers (Orpheus in the Underworld) (1858) - with Ludovic Halévy
- Geneviève de Brabant (1859) - by Louis-Adolphe Jaime and Etienne Tréfeu (revised by Crémieux with Tréfeu)
- La chanson de Fortunio (1861) - with Ludovic Halévy
- Le pont des soupirs (1861) - with Ludovic Halévy
- M. Choufleuri restera chez lui le . . . (1861) - with M de Saint Rémy, Ernest L'Épine and Ludovic Halévy
- Le roman comique (1861) - with Ludovic Halévy
- Jacqueline (1862) - with Ludovic Halévy, with common pseudonym Pol d’Arcy
- Les bergers (1865) - with Philippe Gille
- Robinson Crusoé (1867) - with Eugène Cormon
- La jolie parfumeuse (1873) - with Ernest Blum
- Bagatelle (1874) - with Ernest Blum
- La foire Saint-Laurent (1877) - with Albert de Saint-Albin

=== For Léo Delibes ===
- Les eaux d’Ems (1861) - with Ludovic Halévy

=== For Hervé ===
- Le petit Faust (1869) - with Louis-Adolphe Jaime
- Les Turcs (1869) - with Louis-Adolphe Jaime
- Le trône d'Écosse (1871) - with Louis-Adolphe Jaime
- La veuve du Malabar (1873) - with A. Delacour
- La belle poule (1875) - with Albert de Saint-Albin

=== For Léon Vasseur ===
- La famille Trouillat (1874) - with Ernest Blum

== Plays ==
Amongst the plays written by Hector-Jonathan Crémieux are:

- Fiesque: drame en cinq actes et huit tableaux, en vers, d'après Schiller (1852) - with his brother, Émile Crémieux, and based on Friedrich Schiller's play Die Verschwörung des Fiesco zu Genua
- Germaine: drame en cinq actes et huit tableaux (1858) - with Adolphe d'Ennery and based on Edmond About's novel of the same name
- La voie sacrée, ou, Les étapes de la gloire: drame militaire en cinq actes (1859) - with Eugène Woestyn and Ernest Bourget
- Le pied de mouton (1859) - with Charles-Théodore Cogniard and Jean-Hippolyte Cogniard
- L'Abbe Constantin (1882) - with Pierre Decourcelle and based on Ludovic Halévy's novel of the same name
- Autour du mariage (1883) - with the Comtesse de Martel and based on her novel of the same name
