= Eugène Mestépès =

French librettist

Eugène Gaston Mestépès (1818 in Pau – 15 May 1875 in Paris) was a 19th-century French librettist, playwright and theatre director.

== Biography ==
Mestépès was essentially a librettist of operettas and opéras comiques. His plays were presented mainly at the Théâtre des Bouffes-Parisiens (Le violoneux, Le Roi Boit, Dragonette, Le Duel de Benjamin), the Théâtre-Lyrique (La Demoiselle d’honneur, Maître Griffard, Ondine) and the Fantaisies-Parisiennes (Les Deux Arlequins).

However, he worked on two great dramas: Christophe Colomb (1861) and Le Coup de Jarnac (1866).

Secretary of the Bouffes-Parisiens during the installation passage Choiseul, he ended up being associated with François Varcollier for the exploitation of the theater after the departure of Jacques Offenbach. He was general dramaturge of the Théâtre de l'Ambigu-Comique when he died.

== Works ==
- 1855: Le violoneux, one-act operetta by Jacques Offenbach, Bouffes-Parisiens, 31 August
- 1855: Le Duel de Benjamin, opérette de salon by Émile Jonas, libretto by Eugène Mestépès, Bouffes-Parisiens
- 1857: Les Trois Baisers du Diable, opéra fantastique in 1 act by Jacques Offenbach, Bouffes-Parisiens, 15 January
- 1857: Le Roi Boit, one-act operetta by Émile Jonas, libretto by Eugène Mestépès and Adolphe Jaime, Bouffes-Parisiens, 9 April
- 1857: Dragonette, one-act opéra-bouffe by Jacques Offenbach, libretto by Eugène Mestépès and Adolphe Jaime, Bouffes-Parisiens, 30 April
- 1857: Maître Griffard, one-act opéra comique by Léo Delibes, libretto by Eugène Mestépès and Adolphe Jaime, Théâtre-Lyrique, 3 October
- 1857: La Demoiselle d’honneur, three-act opéra comique by Théophile Semet, libretto by Eugène Mestépès and Sébastien Kauffmann, Théâtre-Lyrique, 30 December
- 1861: Christophe Colomb, drama in 5 acts and a prologue by Eugène Mestépès and Eugène Barré, Théâtre de la Gaîté, 30 August
- 1863: Ondine, three-act opéra comique by Théophile Semet, libretto by Eugène Mestépès and Lockroy, Théâtre-Lyrique, 7 January
- 1863: Job et son chien, one-act operetta by Émile Jonas, libretto by Eugène Mestépès and Ernest Buffault, Bouffes-Parisiens, 6 February
- 1865: Avant la noce, one-act operetta by Émile Jonas, libretto by Eugène Mestépès and Paul Boisselot, Bouffes-Parisiens, 24 March
- 1865: Les Deux Arlequins, one-act opéra comique by Émile Jonas, Fantaisies-Parisiennes, 29 December
- 1866: Le Coup de Jarnac, five-act historical drama by Eugène Mestépès and Couturier, music by Fossey, théâtre de la Gaîté, 20 February
- 1872: Sylvana, four-act opera by Carl Maria von Weber, arranged by Eugène Mestépès, Victor Wilder and Charles Constantin, Théâtre-Lyrique, 2 April

== Sources ==
- Journal pour tous, Paris, 18e année, n°32, Friday 21 May 1875, (p. 510).
