= José Dupuis =

Belgian singer and actor

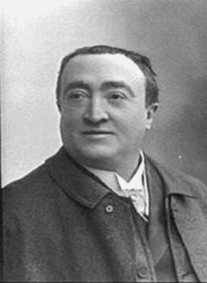
José Dupuis

Joseph-Lambert Dupuis (known as José Dupuis) (18 March 1833, Liège – 9 May 1900, Nogent-sur-Marne) was a Belgian singer and actor. He was principally active in opéra-bouffe in Paris, in particular at the Théâtre des Variétés.

== Career ==
After making his stage debut in Liège, he moved to Paris in 1851 and made his debut at the Théâtre du Luxembourg-Bobino in 1854.

In 1857 he was taken on by Hervé at his Folies-Nouvelles, and continued when the theatre became the Théâtre Déjazet (after its joint manager Virginie Déjazet), only moving on, after fifty or so creations, to the Théâtre des Variétés; he made his debut there on 18 May 1861 in Le Sylphe, a vaudeville by Edmond Rochefort, Charles Varin and Desvergers.

Dupuis was chosen by Offenbach for Paris in La Belle Hélène, and alongside Hortense Schneider, he went on to feature in principal roles in the premieres of some of Offenbach’s most famous works: Barbe-Bleue (title role), La Grande-Duchesse de Gérolstein (Fritz), La Périchole (Piquillo), Le pont des soupirs (1868), Les Brigands (Falsacappa), Les braconniers (1873), La Boulangère a des écus (1875) and Le docteur Ox (1877).

He also worked with Hervé, creating roles in Le Joueur de flûte (1864), Le Trône d'Écosse (1871), La Veuve du Malabar (1873), La Femme à Papa (1879), Lili (1882), La Cosaque (1884) and Mam'zelle Gavroche (1885). For Lecocq he premiered in Le Beau Dunois (1870) and Le grand Casimir (1879) - again at the Variétés.

He appeared as Fritz and Paris until into his fifties, but in his late career also acted in theatre works, especially those of Meilhac and Halévy such as Les Moulins à vent, Les Sonnettes, La Petite Marquise, L'Ingénue, Le Passage de Vénus, La Cigale, Brigitte ou la Petite mère, Décoré!. He retired in 1894 after a final revival of Les Brigands in 1893.

He was twice married, first to Mlle Dantès of the Cirque-Impérial, then to Marie Dubois of the Variétés.
