= La Périchole =

Opera by Jacques Offenbach, premiered in 1868

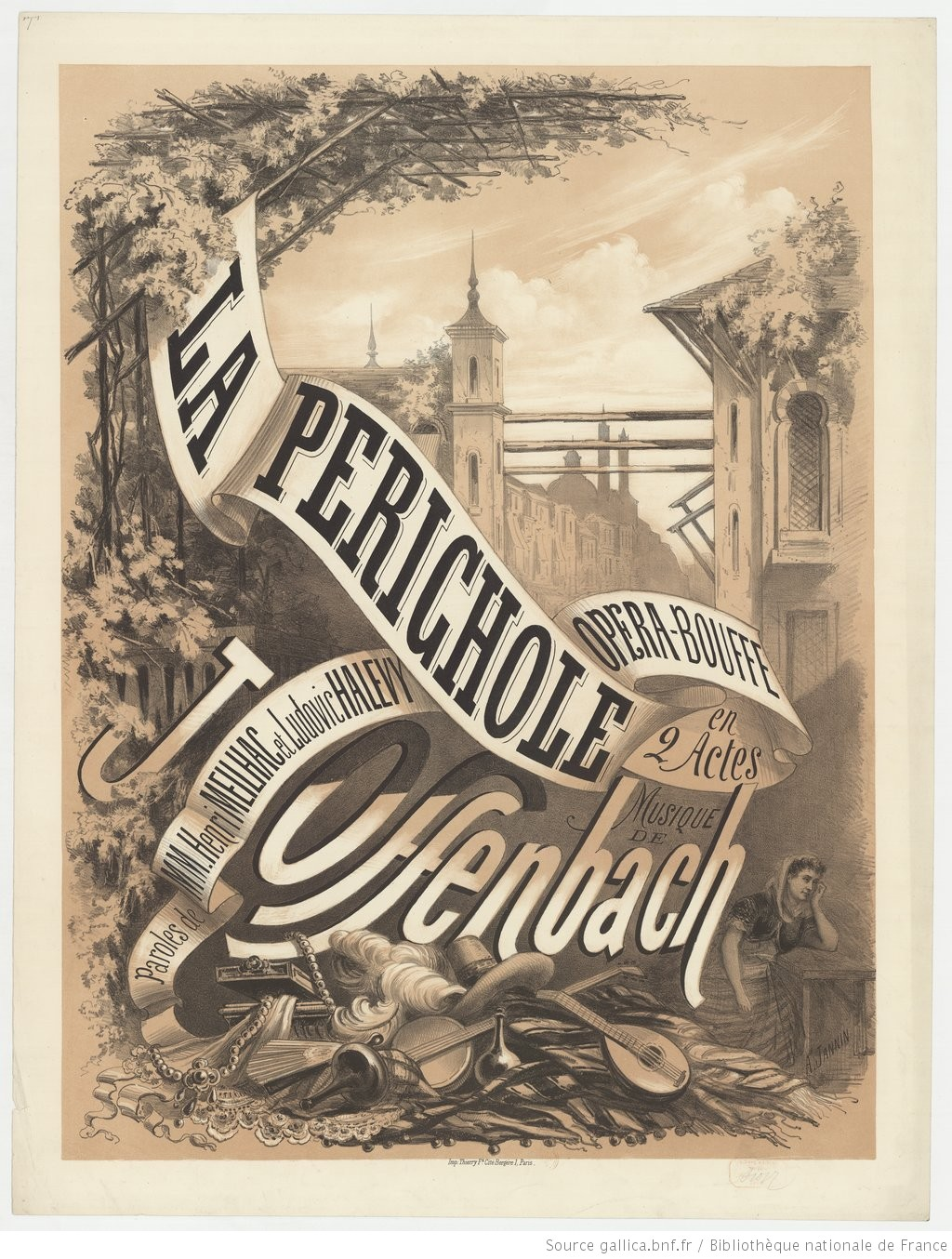
Frontispiece to the 1868 vocal score

La Périchole (French pronunciation: [la peʁikɔl]) is an opéra bouffe in three acts with music by Jacques Offenbach and words by Henri Meilhac and Ludovic Halévy. The opera depicts the mutual love of two impoverished Peruvian street singers – too poor to afford a marriage licence – and a lecherous viceroy, Don Andrès de Ribeira, who wishes to make La Périchole his mistress. Love eventually triumphs. The story is based loosely on the play Le carrosse du Saint-Sacrement by Prosper Mérimée (1828), and the title character is based on the Peruvian entertainer Micaela Villegas.

La Perichole was first seen in a two-act version on 6 October 1868 at the Théâtre des Variétés, Paris, with Hortense Schneider in the title role, José Dupuis as Piquillo and Pierre-Eugène Grenier as the Viceroy. A revised three-act version premiered at the same theatre on 25 April 1874, with the same three stars. The work is considered more sentimental than the earlier Offenbach satires, and the score is infused with Spanish and other dance styles. It was staged throughout Europe and the Americas, and is frequently revived, particularly in France. It has also been broadcast on radio and television and recorded many times.

== Background ==
Between 1855 and 1864, Offenbach collaborated with the librettist Ludovic Halévy on ten stage pieces – mostly one-act comic operas. In 1864 Halévy was joined by Henri Meilhac to write the libretto for Offenbach's La belle Hélène, followed by four more full-length pieces over the next four years, including the immensely successful La Grande-Duchesse de Gérolstein. Meilhac and Halévy based their libretto for La Périchole – very loosely – on an 1828 one-act play Le carrosse du Saint-Sacrement by Prosper Mérimée, (Note: Meilhac and Halévy later used another work by Mérimée as the basis for a non-comic opera – Bizet's Carmen (1875).) which was staged on 13 March 1850 at the Comédie-Française with Augustine Brohan as La Périchole. It was not a great success, and although Offenbach became conductor for the Comédie-Française shortly afterwards it is not certain that he saw the production. Another theatrical creation that pre-dates Offenbach's opéra bouffe and may have influenced the piece is a farce by Desforges and Théaulon given on 21 October 1835 at the Théâtre du Palais-Royal, starring Virginie Déjazet as La Périchole.

The title character of La Périchole is based on Micaela Villegas, an 18th-century Peruvian entertainer and the mistress of Manuel de Amat y Juniet, Viceroy of Peru from 1761 to 1776. The name "La Périchole" is a French adaptation of a Spanish-language epithet by which Amat, during a quarrel, referred to Villegas as a "perra chola" – "native bitch".

== Performance history ==
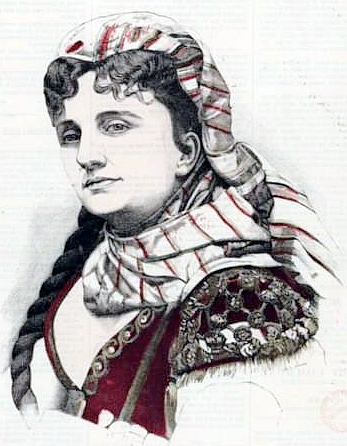
Hortense Schneider as La Périchole

=== Early productions ===
The work premiered, in a two-act version, on 6 October 1868, at the Théâtre des Variétés, Paris, with Hortense Schneider in the title role, José Dupuis as Piquillo and Pierre-Eugène Grenier as the Viceroy. The piece did reasonably well at the box office, but the plot with its poor and hungry heroine and hero exploited by a tyrannical ruler was seen by some as downbeat compared with Offenbach's more exuberant hits, and two drunk scenes offended some members of the audience. After the trauma of the Franco-Prussian War of 1870–71 a revised version with a less sarcastic tone was more in accord with Parisian sensibilities, while La Grande-Duchesse de Gerolstein was banned for its anti-militaristic satire. The revised three-act version premiered at the Variétés on 25 April 1874, with the original three singers in the main roles. The analyst Alexandre Dratwicki comments that the 1874 version though still nominally an opéra bouffe was more in a new opéra comique style that pointed towards the works of Offenbach's younger contemporary Charles Lecocq.

A revival of the three-act version took place at the Variétés on 9 March 1877 with Anna Judic in the title role, with Dupuis. The work was seen again in Paris in 1895, when Jeanne Granier played La Périchole and has been staged frequently in France since then.

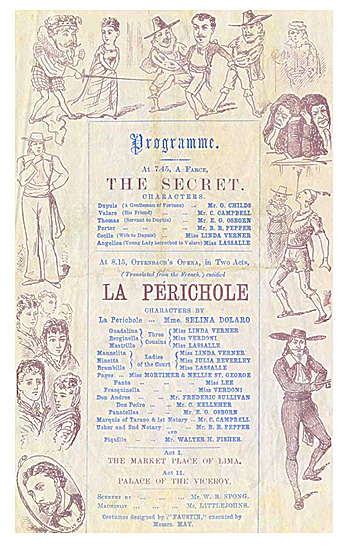
Programme from first London production, 1875

Outside France, La Périchole was first seen in Brussels on 5 December 1868, and then in New York at Pike's Opera House on 4 January 1869, Vienna on 9 January 1869, Stockholm on 6 February 1869, Berlin on 6 April 1870, and London on 27 June 1870 (in French) at the Princess's Theatre, with South American premieres in Rio de Janeiro in 1869 and Buenos Aires in 1870. It had a further run in New York at the Grand Opera House beginning on 18 January 1871.

La Périchole played a part in the development of English comic opera when, on 25 March 1875 at the Royalty Theatre in London, it played (in English) on a triple bill with Charles Collette's one-act farce Cryptoconchoidsyphonostomata and Gilbert and Sullivan's Trial by Jury, the latter of which was written specifically to be a companion piece for La Périchole. Selina Dolaro starred. Trial by Jury became a hit and led to the famous series of Savoy Operas.

=== Later productions ===
==== France ====
In The Encyclopedia of Musical Theatre, Kurt Gänzl comments that although there were revivals of the opera in the later years of the 19th century it was, for a time, less popular than "its more exuberant predecessors", but more recently "as the fashion for theatrical sentimentality has won out over the old fondness for high and/or low comedy, La Périchole has found itself progressively more popular amongst the list of Offenbach's works". In Gänzl's view the piece has come to hold "a position and a popularity in the Offenbach canon greater than at perhaps any other time". The piece has been continually revived in France. Les Archives du spectacle lists more than thirty-five productions in France, Belgium and Switzerland in the late 20th and early 21st centuries, by directors including Maurice Lehmann, Jérôme Savary and Laurent Pelly with singers including Jane Rhodes, Michel Caron, Gabriel Bacquier and Maria Ewing. The most recent (2022) major production in Paris was at the Opéra-Comique with Stéphanie d'Oustrac (La Périchole), Philippe Talbot (Piquillo) and Tassis Christoyannis (Don Andrès de Rebeira).

==== North America ====
Subsequent revivals in New York were at Abbey's Theatre in April 1895 with Lillian Russell (a production she later took to Canada), Jolson's Theatre in December 1925 in a production by the Moscow Arts Theatre company with Olga Baclanova which one critic said turned the piece into "melodrama-bouffe", and in December 1956 at the Metropolitan Opera in a new English version that included interpolations from other Offenbach operas and changes to the libretto and score. Patrice Munsel sang the title role, with Theodor Uppman as Piquillo and Cyril Ritchard (who directed) as the Viceroy. The New York Times described the production as "musical theater at its best".

==== Britain ====
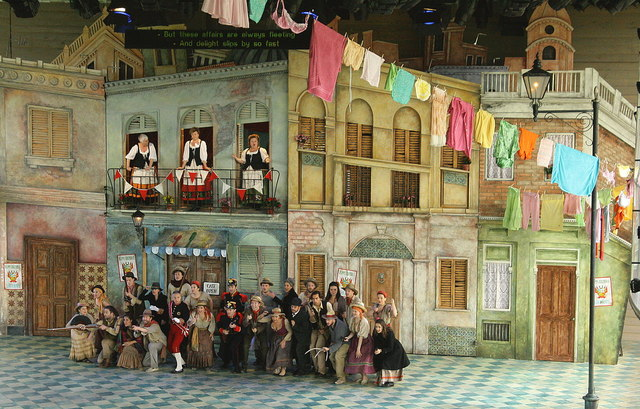
2012 production at the Garsington Opera festival

London performances included productions at the Charing Cross Theatre (March 1876), the Alhambra Theatre (November 1878) with Emily Soldene, the Folly Theatre (April 1879) with Dolaro, and the Garrick Theatre (September 1897) with Florence St John. The John Lewis Partnership Music Society, consisting of amateurs with a professional conductor, producer and professional orchestra (of Chelsea Opera Group), staged a production by Anthony Besch conducted by James Robertson in 1961. Robertson also conducted a London Opera Centre production in 1965. The Buxton Festival, with the Northern Chamber Orchestra under Andrew Greenwood, and Richard Coxon as Piquillo, Victoria Simmonds in the title role, Eric Roberts as Viceroy, staged the work in 2002. The Garsington summer opera festival mounted the piece in 2012 with Naomi O'Connell and Robert Murray in the lead roles. (Note: Other productions seen in Britain have included a touring production by The Singers Company starting at the Riverside Studios; Peter Knapp directed with Eirian James in the title role, Alan Watt as the Viceroy and John Bluthal the Old Prisoner. and a revival by Dorset Opera of the three-act 1874 version, with Patrick Shelley conducting the Bournemouth Symphony Orchestra; the principals included Omar Ebrahim as the Viceroy, Ivan Sharpe as Piquillo and Claire Henry as Périchole.)

==== Other European productions ====
A 1931 revival at the Kroll Opera in Berlin was well received. A contemporary reviewer wrote:

The libretto was entirely re-written by the well-known Viennese author and critic, Karl Kraus. In spite of the literary merits of this new version, however, the effect of the operetta is mainly due to Offenbach's by no means antiquated music, with its characteristic mixture of clever parody and genuine sentiment, its graceful melody, its vivid rhythms, and its strikingly effective dramatic points".

In 1977 at Stockholm's Södra Teatern (in Swedish) Elisabeth Söderström took the title-role, with Jonny Blanc as Piquillo, and Hans Alfredson as the Viceroy, with Birgit Nordin, Sylvia Lindenstrand, Ileana Peterson and Carl Johan Falkman. The Vienna Volksoper mounted a new production of the piece in 1992, and it was seen in 1998 in Zurich with Philippe Duminy as Don Andres, Deon van der Walt as Piquillo, and Vesselina Kasarova as La Périchole.

== Roles ==
Role	Voice type	Premiere cast, 6 October 1868, (Conductor: Jacques Offenbach)	Revised version, 25 April 1874, (Conductor: Jacques Offenbach)
La Périchole, a poor street singer	mezzo-soprano	Hortense Schneider	Hortense Schneider
Piquillo, a poor street singer	tenor	José Dupuis	José Dupuis
Don Andrès de Ribeira, Viceroy of Peru	baritone	Pierre-Eugène Grenier	Pierre-Eugène Grenier
Don Miguel de Panatellas, First Gentleman of the Bedchamber	tenor	Christian	Baron
Don Pedro de Hinoyosa, Mayor of Lima	baritone	Lecomte	Léonce
Guadalena, first cousin	soprano	Legrand	J Grandville
Berginella, second cousin	soprano	Carlin	Lina Bell
Mastrilla, third cousin	mezzo-soprano	C. Renault	Schweska
The Marquis de Tarapote, Lord Chancellor	spoken	Charles Blondelet	Charles Blondelet
Manuelita, lady of the Court	soprano	Julia H	Martin
Ninetta, lady of the Court	soprano	Bénard	Valpré
Brambilla, lady of the Court	mezzo-soprano	Gravier	Lavigne
Frasquinella, lady of the Court	mezzo-soprano	A Latour	Julia
First notary	tenor	Bordier	Bordier
Second notary	tenor	Horton	Monti
First drinker (1868)	tenor	Videix	–
Second drinker (1868)	tenor	Halserc	–
Two men, a courtesan and a bailiff (1868)	–	–	–
Le Marquis de Satarem, "The old prisoner", in disguise (1874)	spoken	–	D Bac
Gaoler (1874)	spoken	–	Coste
Chorus: A crowd, drinkers, showmen; Ladies and Lords of the court; soldiers.

== Synopsis ==
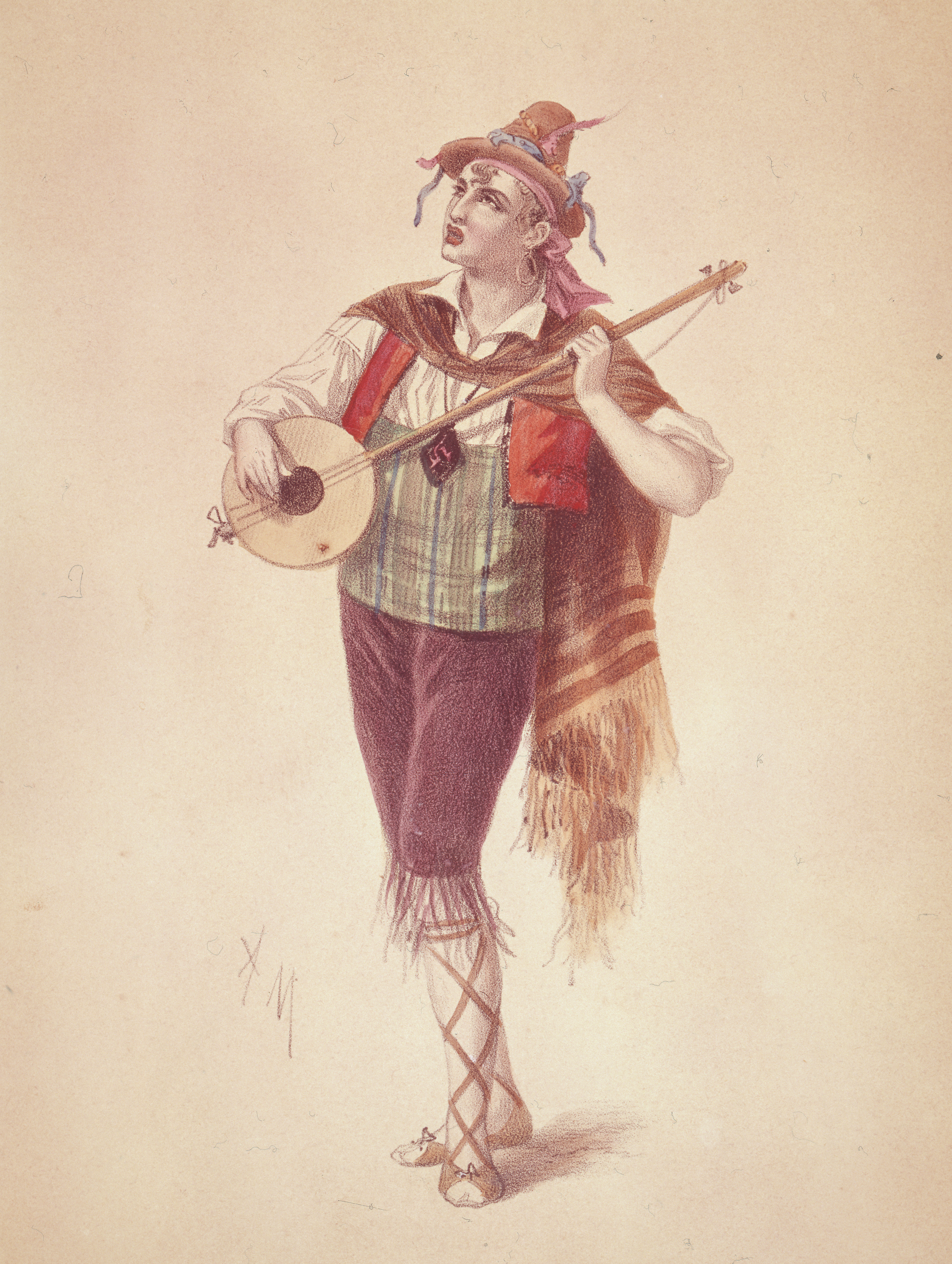
Costume illustration for José Dupuis as Piquillo (1874)

Place: Lima, Peru
Time: 1750s

=== Act 1 ===
The Plaza

In the main square of Lima, outside The Three Cousins tavern, the crowd is celebrating the birthday of Don Andrès de Ribeira, the Viceroy of Peru. Don Pedro de Hinoyosa (Mayor of Lima), Count Miguel de Panatellas (First Gentleman of the Bedchamber), and Don Andrès enter in disguise. Everyone recognizes them but pretends not to. La Périchole and Piquillo, poor young street singers, arrive in the square, trying to raise money for their marriage licence. They please the crowd with romantic duets, but some acrobats entice the crowd away before they can collect any money. Piquillo sets off, hoping for better luck elsewhere, while Périchole escapes hunger in sleep.

The Viceroy, enchanted with her beauty, offers her a position as Lady in Waiting at the court as soon as she awakes. Despite her suspicions about what he has in mind, she is persuaded by his offer of banquets and accepts, writing a loving farewell letter to Piquillo. Since all Ladies in Waiting must be married, Don Pedro and Panatellas leave to search for a husband for Périchole. They find Piquillo, who is about to hang himself after reading Périchole's farewell letter. After plenty to drink, Piquillo reluctantly agrees to marry the Viceroy's new favourite, although he does not know who it is. Périchole has also been plied with drink by the Viceroy ("Ah, quel diner"), but she agrees to the marriage when she recognizes Piquillo. He does not recognize his veiled bride, but he goes through with the marriage after warning her that he is in love with someone else. They are taken to the Viceroy's palace.

=== Act 2 ===
The Palace

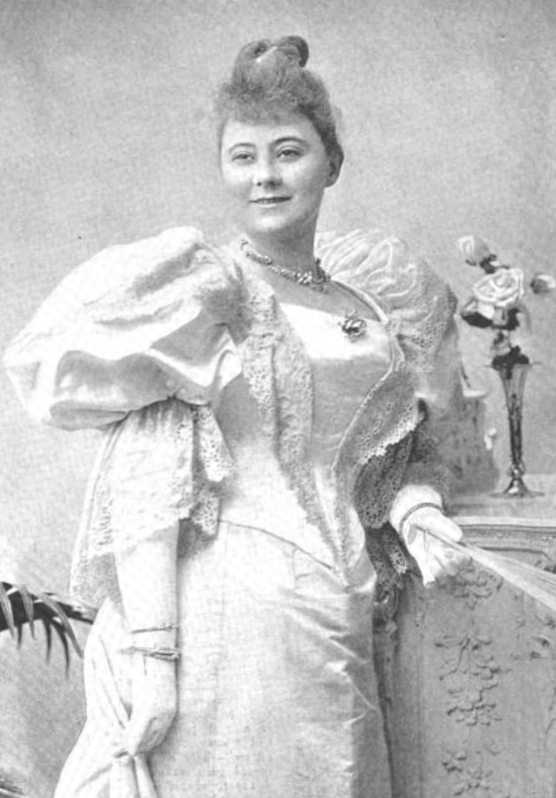
Florence St. John as La Périchole, 1897

The next morning, four ladies of the court gossip with the Marquis de Tarapote, Chamberlain of the Viceroy, about the Viceroy's new favourite. Piquillo arrives and is astonished to find that he is married to an unknown woman, the new mistress of the Viceroy. He tells the Mayor and First Gentleman that he loves another woman. He demands his payment so that he can go in search of Périchole, but they tell him that he must present his new wife to the Viceroy first. When Périchole appears, resplendent in her new court finery, Piquillo is crushed and throws her to the floor in front of the Viceroy instead of formally presenting her. Don Andres orders him to the dungeon for recalcitrant husbands.

=== Act 3 ===
Scene 1: The Dungeon

In the dark and gloomy dungeon, an old prisoner enters through a trap door. After digging through the wall of his cell for twelve years with his tiny pen knife, he has finally emerged, unfortunately into another cell. He retreats to his cell when Don Pedro and Panatellas bring Piquillo in. Piquillo mourns the loss of both his lover and his freedom and eventually falls asleep. Périchole enters, tells Piquillo that she has remained true to him, and they renew their vows. Périchole tries to bribe a jailor with jewels the Viceroy has given her, to buy Piquillo's freedom, but the jailor is the Viceroy in disguise. He calls the guards, and the lovers are chained to the dungeon wall. But the Viceroy still hopes to win Périchole and tells her to sing if she changes her mind and decides to cooperate. The old prisoner enters through his passage and releases them from the chains. Périchole sings, and when the Viceroy enters, the three prisoners chain him to the wall and escape.

Scene 2: The Plaza

The three fugitives hide in The Three Cousins tavern as the Viceroy and his soldiers search for them in the plaza outside. Périchole and Piquillo, dressed as street performers, plead for their freedom with a ballad about their own love story that ends with them returning all the gifts they had accepted and resuming their old poor but loving lives; this affects the Viceroy, and he forgives the couple and allows Périchole to keep the jewels he has given her. Meanwhile, the old prisoner has turned out to be the long lost Marquis of Santarém. The Viceroy is happy to pardon him as well (and no one can remember what his original crime was supposed to be), rather than send him back to destroy more walls in prison.

== Musical numbers ==
Act 1			
Ouverture			
Chœur	Du Vice-Roi c'est aujourd'hui la fête	This is the Viceroy's name-day	Chœur
Chansons des Trois Cousines	Promptes à servir	Prompt to serve	Les Trois Cousines, Chœur
Sortie et dialogue	Ah ! qu'on y fait gaîment glouglou	Ah they gaily swig	Don Pedro, Panatellas
Chœur	C'est lui, c'est notre Vice-Roi !	It's he! Our Viceroy	Chœur
Couplets	Sans en rien souffler à personne	Without saying anything to anyone	Don Andrès, Chœur
Marche indienne		Indian March	
Entrée des chanteurs		Entry of the singers	
Complainte	Le conquérant dit à la jeune Indienne	The conqueror says to the Indian girl	La Périchole, Piquillo
Séguedille	Vous a-t-on dit souvent	Have you often been told	La Périchole, Piquillo
Couplets de la lettre	Ô mon cher amant, je te jure	Oh, my dear lover I swear to you	La Périchole
Finale	Oh ! là ! hé !... holà ! de là-bas	Hey there, ho there – all come quickly	Don Andrès, Don Pedro, Les Trois Cousines, Les Deux Notaires, Chœur
Couplets de la griserie	Ah ! quel dîner je viens de faire !	Ah, what a dinner!	La Périchole, Don Andrès, Panatellas, Don Pedro
Suite du Finale [Finale, continued]	Ah ! les autres étaient bien gris	Ah, the others were very drunk	La Périchole, Piquillo, Panatellas, Les Trois Cousines, Chœur
Duetto du mariage	Je dois vous prévenir, madame	I must warn you, madam	Piquillo, La Périchole
Suite du Finale [Finale, continued]	Mon Dieu !... que de cérémonie !...	My God! What a ceremony	Tous
Act 2			
Entracte			
Chœur des Dames de la cour	Cher seigneur, revenez à vous	Good sir, come to your senses	Les Quatre Dames, Chœur
Cancans-couplets	On vante partout son sourire	We boast everywhere about our smile	Les Quatre Dames, Piquillo
Couplets	Et là, maintenant que nous sommes seuls	And there, now that we are alone	Piquillo, Don Pedro, Panatellas
Chœur de la présentation	Nous allons donc voir un mari	So we're going to see a husband	La Périchole, Don Andrès, Piquillo, Don Pedro, Panatellas, Les Quatre Dames, L'Huissier, Chœur
Couplets	Que veulent dire ces colères	What do these tantrums mean?	La Périchole, Piquillo
Rondo de bravoure	Écoute, ô roi, je te présente	Listen, O King, I present Thee	Piquillo
Galop de l'arrestation	Sautez dessus !	Jump on him!	Don Andrès, La Périchole, Piquillo, Don Pedro, Panatellas, Les Quatre Dames, Chœur
Rondo	Conduisez-le, bons courtisans	Press on, good courtiers	Tous
Act 3			
Entracte			
Couplets-Boléro	Les maris courbaient la tête	Husbands bowed their heads	Piquillo, Panatellas, Don Pedro
Air	On me proposait d'être infâme	They tried to make me despicable	Piquillo
Duo	Dans ces couloirs obscurs	In these dark corridors	La Périchole, Piquillo
Couplets de l'aveu	Tu n'es pas beau; tu n'es pas riche	You are not good-looking; you are not rich	La Périchole, Piquillo
Trio	Je suis le joli geôlier	I am the handsome jailer	La Périchole, Piquillo, Don Andrès
Trio de la prison	Roi pas plus haut qu'une botte	King no higher than a boot	La Périchole, Piquillo, Don Andrès
Intermède symphonique			
Complainte des amoureux	Écoutez, peup' d'Amérique	Listen, people of America, Spain and Peru	La Périchole, Piquillo
Finale	Tous deux, au temps de peine et de misère	We both, at times of sorrow and misery	Tous

Source: Notes to the Bru-Zane set (details below), consisting of numbers from the 1868 original and the 1874 revision.

== Critical reception ==
After the 1868 premiere the reviewer in Le Figaro praised the piece for "its verve, its grace and its wit":

The rhythmic vivacities which distinguish the manner of M. Jacques Offenbach were highly appreciated in the first act of the work. I will single out the introduction, the verses of the viceroy, which were encored, the two songs of Piquillo and his beloved (the first especially) and the finale ... But the crowning part of the work is the letter from the unfaithful Périchole to her dear Piquillo. It is a cry from the heart in this noisy madness, a tear shining like a pearl in this burst of laughter. ... The melody has a simplicity that stirs and disturbs the heart.

When Schneider's company presented the piece in London in 1870 the reviewer in The Pall Mall Gazette commented that it was essentially the plot of La Grande-Duchesse de Gerolstein in reverse: in the latter the foibles of a female ruler with a roving eye were displayed and in the new work "we are shown the sort of scrape into which a male ruler may be led by a similar sort of weakness".

In Grove's Dictionary of Music and Musicians, Andrew Lamb describes the score as in Offenbach's "most charming", rather than satirical style, with boleros, seguidillas and galops used to provide the exotic backdrop. Highlights, in Lamb's view, include La Périchole's letter song, O mon cher amant; her "tipsy" aria, Ah! quel dîner!; and (for the 1874 revision) her third-act aria to Piquillo, Tu n'es pas beau, tu n'es pas riche, Offenbach's last major song for Hortense Schneider. The operetta specialist Richard Traubner writes of La Périchole, "The usual Meilhac–Halévy silliness is all there, but there is also a more sentimental vein in the leading character, which Offenbach exploited in several numbers, most famously the Act 1 letter song". He adds: "Offenbach’s score is rich in Spanish (if not Peruvian) suggestions – boleros, seguidillas and fandangos abut galops, waltzes and marches – and is one of his most magical creations; the finales in particular are superb".

== Broadcasts and recordings ==
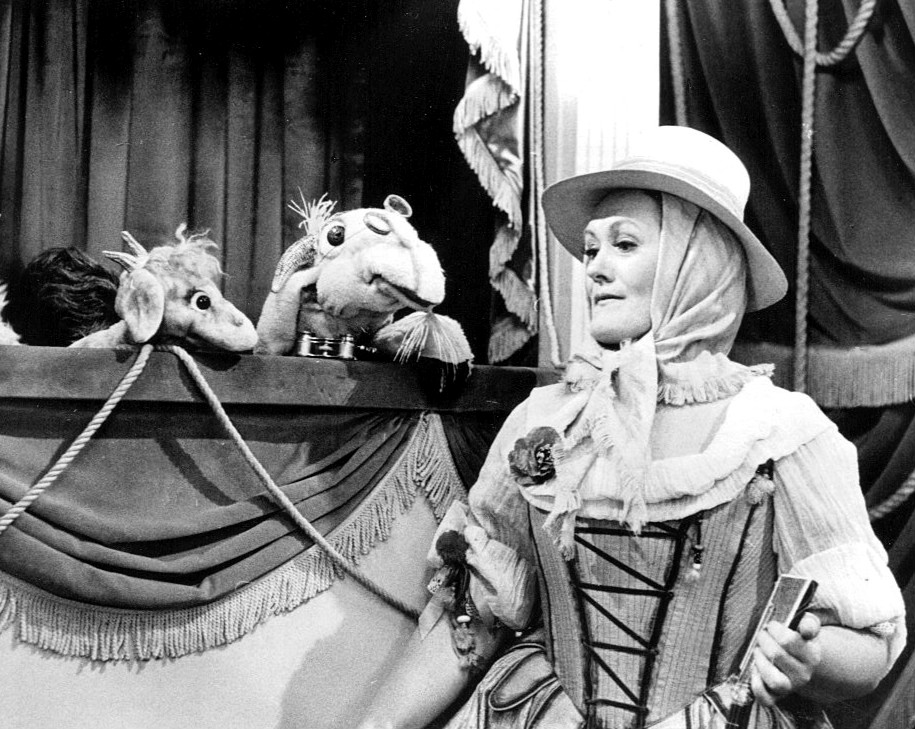
Joan Sutherland as Périchole in a 1972 PBS television programme

=== Broadcasts ===
La Périchole has been produced on French television and radio over many years. The first radio broadcast was in 1928, then, among others 1946 and 1949 (with Fanély Revoil), 1950 (with Denise Duval and Joseph Peyron), and 1968 with Maria Murano, Michel Caron and Jean Brun. The first televised broadcast was in 1952 (with Revoil and Lenoty), then a recording of a performance at the Gaîté-Lyrique in June 1956 with Murano, another in 1971 (from the Théâtre de Paris) and one in 1981 (from the Carpentras Festival). In Britain BBC radio broadcast in 1962 a recording in French originally made by Radiodiffusion-Television Francaise and English versions of the piece in 1966 and 1980, the latter commemorating the centenary of the composer's death. BBC television broadcast a production in English in 1980 filmed at the Royal Opera House, Covent Garden. A production by the Singers Company recorded at the Chichester Festival Theatre was broadcast in England in September 1980.

=== Recordings ===
- 1948: S Golemba, G Polyakov, V Kandelaki, S Tsenine, V Fedossov. National Musical Theatre of Moscow, cond. A. Alevladov & A. Akulov. Melodia
- 1957 (in English, abridged): Patrice Munsel, Theodor Uppman, Cyril Ritchard, Paul Franke, Ralph Herbert. Metropolitan Opera New York, cond. Jean Morel. RCA
- 1958: Suzanne Lafaye, Raymond Amade, Louis Noguéra, Jean-Christophe Benoît, Chœurs René Duclos, Orchestre des concerts Lamoureux, cond. Igor Markevitch. EMI
- 1976: Régine Crespin, Alain Vanzo, Jules Bastin, Gérard Friedmann, Jacques Trigeau, Aime Besançon, Paul Guigue, Rebecca Roberts, Eva Saurova, Germaine Baudoz, Ine Meister. Opéra du Rhin Chorus, Strasbourg Philharmonic Orchestra, cond. Alain Lombard. Erato
- 1981: Teresa Berganza, José Carreras, Gabriel Bacquier, Chœur et Orchestre du Capitole de Toulouse, cond. Michel Plasson. EMI
- 1982: Maria Ewing, Neil Rosenshein, Gabriel Bacquier, Paolo Martinelli, Ricardo Cassinelli. Chœur de Grand-Théâtre, Orchestre de la Suisse Romande, cond. Marc Soustrot. Gala
- 2009 (in German): Sabine Brohm, Ralf Simon, Gerd Wiemer, Chor der Staatsoperette Dresden Orchester der Staatsoperette Dresden, cond. Ernst Theis. CPO
- 2018: Aude Extremo, Stanislas de Barbeyrac, Alexandre Duhamel, Choeur de l'Opéra national de Bordeaux, Les Musiciens du Louvre, cond. Marc Minkowski. Bru-Zane

There is a video recording of the 2022 production at the Opéra-Comique (see Performance history, above), conducted by Julien Leroy and directed by Valerie Lesort.

== Other operatic versions of the play by Prosper Mérimée ==
- Le carrosse du Saint-Sacrement by Lord Berners is a one-act comic opera first performed at the Trianon-Lyrique, Paris, in 1923.
- Le carrosse du Saint-Sacrement by Henri Busser is a one-act comédie lyrique, first performed at the Opéra-Comique, Paris, on 2 June 1948.

== Notes, references and sources ==
=== Sources ===
- Crowther, Andrew (2011). Gilbert of Gilbert & Sullivan. Gloucester: History Press. ISBN 978-0-7524-5589-1.
- Dean, Winton (1965). Georges Bizet: His Life and Work. London: J. M. Dent & Sons. OCLC 645685.
- Dratwicki, Alexandre (2019). "The Péricholes of Offenbach, and Marc Minkowski's version". Notes to Bru Zane CD set. Venice: Palazzetto Bru Zane. ISBN 978-84-09-08316-9.
- Gänzl, Kurt (2001). The Encyclopedia of the Musical Theatre (second ed.). New York: Schirmer. ISBN 978-0-02-864970-2.
- Gänzl, Kurt; Andrew Lamb (1988). Gänzl's Book of the Musical Theatre. London: The Bodley Head. OCLC 966051934.
- Harding, James (1980). Jacques Offenbach: A Biography. London: John Calder. ISBN 978-0-7145-3835-8.
- Traubner, Richard (1997). "Jacques Offenbach". In Holden, Amanda (ed.). The Penguin Opera Guide. London: Penguin. ISBN 978-0-14-051385-1.
- Traubner, Richard (2003). Operetta: A Theatrical History (second ed.). London: Routledge. ISBN 978-0-415-96641-2.
- Yon, Jean-Claude (2000). Jacques Offenbach (in French). Paris: Gallimard. ISBN 978-2-07-074775-7.
