= Pierre-Eugène Grenier =

French singer

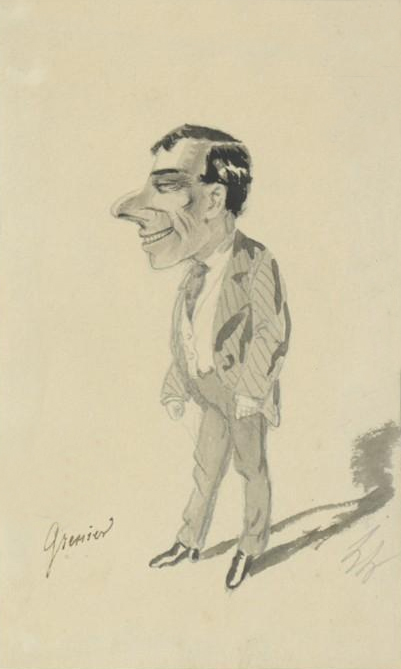
Pierre Grenier : portrait

Pierre-Eugène Grenier (1832 – 14 January 1875) was a French actor-singer.

== Life ==
A student of Joseph Isidore Samson at the Conservatoire, he won first prize in declamation before making his debuts at the Théâtre de l'Odéon in 1854 in the play The Barber of Seville by Beaumarchais. Specialising in valet rôle, he was taken on by Hippolyte Cogniard at the Théâtre des Variétés in 1859, where he stayed for the rest of his career, with the sole exception of the title rôle in Rabagas by Victorien Sardou, which he played more than 200 times at the Théâtre du Vaudeville in 1872.

At the Théâtre des Variétés, he acted in the main opéra-bouffes by Jacques Offenbach : La Belle Hélène (in the rôle of Calchas), Barbe-Bleue (comte Oscar), La Grande-Duchesse de Gérolstein (prince Paul), Le Pont des soupirs (Le Chef du Conseil des dix), Les Braconniers (Campistrous), the second version of La Vie Parisienne (Bobinet) and La Périchole (the Viceroy in the two versions in 1868 and 1874). He also appeared in several other pieces, including Monsieur Jules, L'Homme n'est pas parfait, Le Tour du cadran, Le Trône d'Écosse by Hervé and Les Merveilleuses. He was a member (Membre) of the "Comité des Artistes"and died suddenly in 1875. A benefit concert in aid of his mother was organised by his fellow actors on 28 September 1875 – this marked the final stage appearance of the actress Virginie Déjazet.
