= Micaela Villegas =

Peruvian actress (1748–1819)

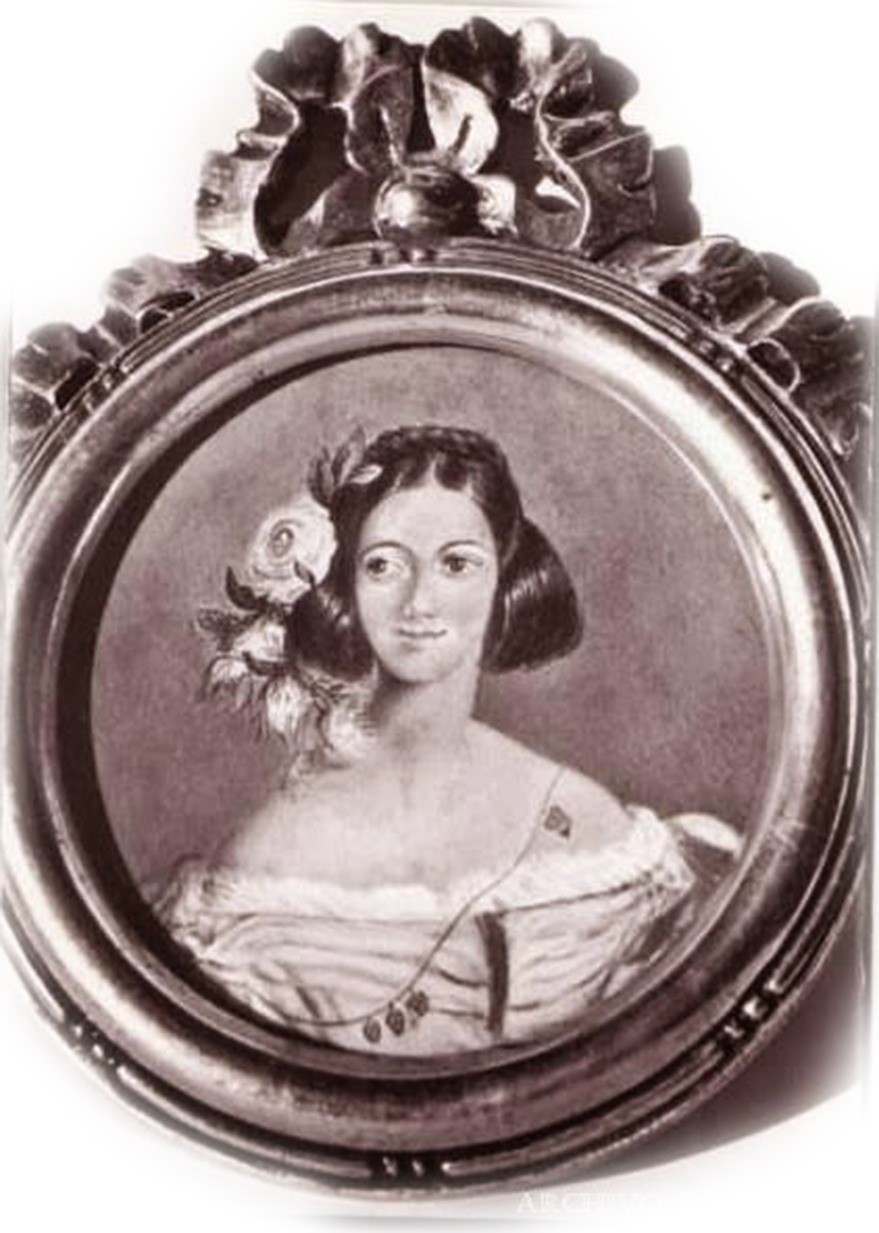
Perricholi

Maria Micaela Villegas Hurtado (28 September 1748 – 16 May 1819), known as La Perricholi, was a Peruvian entertainer and mistress of Manuel de Amat y Junyent, Viceroy of Peru from 1761 to 1776. Their son, Manuel de Amat y Villegas, was one of the signers of Peru’s declaration of independence from Spain on 28 July 1821.

== Life ==
La Perricholi was the sixth child born to Don José Villegas and Doña Teresa Hurtado de Mendoza. Born in either Tomayquichua (in the province of Huanuco) or the capital city of Lima, she was baptized at the Lima Cathedral on December 1, 1748.

She debuted on the stage of Coliseo de Comedias in 1763 and became a popular star within romance and comedy. She retired in 1788, and married in 1795.

Ricardo Palma in his book Tradiciones Peruanas writes about her life and describes her as charming woman. He also provides historical information about her relationship with Amat. According to the author, she inspired Amat to build some of the beautiful buildings in the colonial city of Lima, such as the Alameda de los Descalzos, La Quinta de Presa, el Templo de las Nazarenas or El Paseo de Aguas.

Her story provided the basis for Prosper Mérimée’s comic one-act Le Carrosse du Saint-Sacrement, which in turn provided the basis for both Jacques Offenbach’s opéra bouffe, La Périchole and Jean Renoir’s 1953 film Le Carrosse d'or (The Golden Coach).

A miniseries was made in 1994 based on her story. Written by Eduardo Adrianzen, its great success launched the career of Mónica Sánchez, who played La Perricholi.

She and the Viceroy are prominent characters in Thornton Wilder's The Bridge of San Luis Rey.
