= Michel Caron (tenor) =

French operatic tenor and stage actor (1929–2001)

Michel Caron (29 April 1929 in Sèvres - 3 September 2001 in Le Mesnil-Simon, Eure-et-Loir) was a French operatic tenor and stage actor.

He sang in operettas like The White Horse Inn (1960) and opéra-bouffe La Périchole with Jean Le Poulain and Roger Carel, and Barbe Bleue with Jean Le Poulain and Arlette Didier (1968).

== Biographie ==
From childhood, Michel Caron wanted to become an actor. He entered the René Simon class, then the Conservatoire de Paris where he won three first prizes: opera, comic opera and operetta.

Caron's career began at the Théâtre du Châtelet to perform Guy Florès during a revival of The White Horse Inn (1960/1961).

He was then at the top of the bill for two plays of opéra-bouffe, performed in 1968, La Périchole with Jean Le Poulain and Roger Carel and Barbe Bleue with Jean Le Poulain and Arlette Didier.

== Filmography ==
- 1978: Les Enquêtes du commissaire Maigret, episode: Maigret et le tueur by Marcel Cravenne
- 1981: Le Choix des armes, by Alain Corneau
- 1982: Le Démon dans l'île by Francis Leroi

== Bibliography ==
- Mishima n'était pas un héros, the testimony book of his eldest daughter Laurence Caron-Spokojny on the disappearance of Michel Caron, 3 September 2001, Editions Publibook, 2013, ISBN 978-2342000269.
