= Le château à Toto =

Opéra bouffe by Jacques Offenbach

Jacques Offenbach by Nadar, c. 1860s

Le château à Toto (Toto’s castle) is an opéra bouffe in three acts of 1868 with music by Jacques Offenbach. The French libretto was by Henri Meilhac and Ludovic Halévy. It is situated in an important sequence of fifteen opera works and revivals by Offenbach between 1867 and 1869.

== Background ==
Offenbach began work on the piece in January 1868 while staying in Nice; he was also composing Les brigands and Vert-Vert at the time. The piece was premiered in the Théâtre du Palais-Royal in Paris but achieved nothing like the success of his previous venture at that theatre, La Vie parisienne. Despite having as many disguises as the earlier work, and some isolated successful numbers such as the ‘café-concert’ song of the rural postman (where he debates the merits of long or short legs, and the value of the penny-farthing), the work closed by the end of July.

After the initial run, a two-act version was staged at the Palais-Royal on 16 December 1868 with Lucy Arbell as Toto, but this closed by the end of the year. The work was seen at the Carltheater in Vienna in February 1869.

The critical edition of Le château à Toto in the Offenbach Edition Keck has been performed in Frankfurt (2003) and at the Offenbach Festival des Châteaux de Bruniquel (2008, 2024).

Although no complete recording is available, excerpts have appeared on the anthologies 'Offenbach au menu' and 'Entre Nous'.

== Roles ==
Role	Voice type	Premiere Cast, 6 May 1868, (Conductor: Jacques Offenbach)
Le Baron de Crécy-Crécy	baritone	Gil-Pérès
Pitou	tenor	Jules Brasseur
Maitre Massepain, notary	baritone	Hyacinthe
Raoul de la Pépinière, marquis	tenor	Lassouche
Un vieux serviteur	bass	Vollet
Hector de la Roche-Trompette ‘Toto’	soprano	Zulma Bouffar
Catherine	mezzo-soprano	Alphonsine
Jeanne de Crécy-Crécy	soprano	Worms
Blanche – ‘la Vicomtesse de la Farandole’	mezzo-soprano	Paurelle
Niquette	soprano	Verne
Chorus: Peasants.

== Synopsis ==
Time and place: Normandy, the present

=== Act 1 ===
Hector de la Roche-Trompette, called 'Toto', has blown his fortune in the pleasures of Paris, and returns home in order to auction his ancestral home. The neighbouring Baron Jean de Crécy-Crécy plans to take advantage of this opportunity to win the centuries-old feud between the Crécy-Crécys and the Roche-Trompettes, and use the castle as kennels and stables. The local notary Ernest Massepain is organising the sale. Toto, accompanied by the Marquis Raoul de la Pépinière and the Vicomtesse de La Farandole come to stay at Catherine's farm. Raoul is fascinated by Catherine who browbeats her admirer Pitou. Toto is moved by the affection shown to him by the daughter of the Baron, Jeanne.

=== Act 2 ===
In the second act the Vicomtesse (in reality the worldly Blanche Taupier, once a peasant in the region) expresses the wish to buy the castle. Crécy-Crécy bids as much as he can, but he and the Vicomtesse are outdone by the old General Bougachard – Pitou in disguise, to whom Jeanne has lent her dowry to outdo her father. After the sale during the celebration Pitou loses his disguise and is discovered; he escapes to Catherine's farm, where Toto, Raoul and the Vicomtesse are staying. He flees just as a rural patrol (none other than Massepain, disguised in order to get near the ‘Vicomtesse’) approaches.

=== Act 3 ===
In the final act the Baron also resorts to disguise, as a rural postman, as he also wishes to court the Vicomtesse. While Catherine finds Raoul too common for her liking, Pitou, dressed as a dandy wins her heart finally. The Baron de Crécy-Crécy is unmasked and obliged to allow Jeanne to marry Toto, who will therefore be able to keep the family castle; her father wins over the ‘Vicomtesse’. Toto renounces the pleasures of Paris to return to the simple joys of the country life.
