= Louis Baron =

French actor and opera singer (1838–1920)

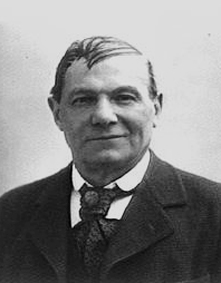
Baron c. 1880

Louis Baron (real name Louis Bouchêne or Bouchenez; September 1838 – 2 March 1920) was a French actor and bass singer.

== Biography ==
Louis Baron was born in September 1838 at Alençon.

His first stage appearances were at the Théâtre de la Tour-d'Auvergne, and subsequently in Limoges (1857–58) and Troyes (1858–59). After military service as a customs officer he then appeared in Toulouse (1863) and Rouen (1864–66).

In July 1866 he made his debut at the Théâtre des Variétés in the comedy Le photographe by Meilhac and Ludovic Halévy, going on to create many other roles in plays by Labiche (Les trente millions de gladiator) and Meilhac and Halévy (including La cigale, La petite marquise, and Toto chez Tata).

In the field of operetta he created various roles in works by Offenbach including La Grande-Duchesse de Gérolstein, Les brigands, and La boulangère a des écus, as well as appearing in revivals. For Hervé he created Célestin in Mam'zelle Nitouche, as well as roles in Lili, La Femme à papa, and Le Trône d'Écosse.

In 1886, he was briefly co-director of the Variétés with Eugène Bertrand before moving on to the Gaîté.

His son, Louis Baron, fils (1870–1939), was also an actor and singer who had a long stage and film career in France including the premiere of Dédé in 1921.

Louis Baron died in Paris on 2 March 1920.
