= Barbe-bleue (opera) =

Opéra bouffe, or operetta, by Jacques Offenbach

- Opéra bouffe by Jacques Offenbach
- Jacques Offenbach by Nadar, c. 1860s
- Librettist: Henri Meilhac and Ludovic Halévy
- Language: French
- Based on: Bluebeard by Charles Perrault
- Premiere: 5 February 1866; Théâtre des Variétés, Paris

Barbe-bleue (French pronunciation: [baʁb blø], Bluebeard) is an opéra bouffe, or operetta, in three acts (four scenes) by Jacques Offenbach to a French libretto by Henri Meilhac and Ludovic Halévy based on Charles Perrault's 1697 story.

== Performance history ==
The work was composed while Offenbach was travelling during 1865, in Vienna, Brussels and Cologne, conducting his works in those cities. Other distractions during the period were the marriage on 9 August in Étretat of his eldest daughter Berthe to Charles Comte (for which he composed a mass) and problems with gout (which he encouraged the press to report).

It was first performed at the Théâtre des Variétés, Paris on 5 February 1866, playing for five months. Following the great success of the creators' Belle Hélène, the roles were close relations of the composer's antique operetta: Dupuis (Paris) another seducer, in Barbe-Bleue, Kopp (Ménélas) another old vain, cuckolded monarch in Bobèche, Grenier (Calchas) once more the mediocre confidant of a king - Count Oscar and Schneider (Hélène) again a woman seeking all of her desires - Boulotte. Contemporary critics judged the libretto to be one of the best constructed the composer set.

Productions outside France followed swiftly: London, Vienna and Brussels in 1866, Stockholm, Berlin, Budapest, Milan and Copenhagen in 1867. The operetta was given in New York City at Niblo's Garden in 1868 and at the Grand Opera House on 24 December 1870 and seen in Sydney, Australia in 1872. It had its Czech premiere in 1874, under Adolf Čech.

The work was revived in 1888 at the Variétés in Paris with Jeanne Granier as Boulotte. A 1904 Paris revival included Baron as Bobèche, Ève Lavallière as Hermia and Tariol as Boulotte. In 1941, Mikael Fokine's final choreography consisted of a ballet reworking by Antal Doráti, staged in Mexico. In the period up to 1963 the work was much neglected until the Komische Oper production that year; the Berlin production was directed by Walter Felsenstein and continued for many years in the repertoire of the house as well as being filmed and toured. In 1966 Sadler's Wells Opera produced the work in a translation by Geoffrey Dunn, with Joyce Blackham as Boulotte, Margaret Neville as Fleurette, Eric Shilling as Popolani, John Fryatt as King Bobeche, Julian Orchard as Count Oscar and James Hawthorne in the title role; it was conducted by Alexander Faris. In 1971 the Théâtre de Paris presented the piece in a disfigured edition, musically and textually, with Jean Le Poulain playing both Bobèche and Popolani. Productions were mounted in Geneva in 1984 and in Strasbourg in 1996.

In the 11th Offenbach staging of his career, Laurent Pelly created a new production in Lyon in June 2019. The title role was sung by Yann Beuron, with Héloïse Mas as Boulotte, Christophe Mortagne as Bobêche and Christophe Gay as Popolani; Michele Spotti was in the pit.

== Roles ==
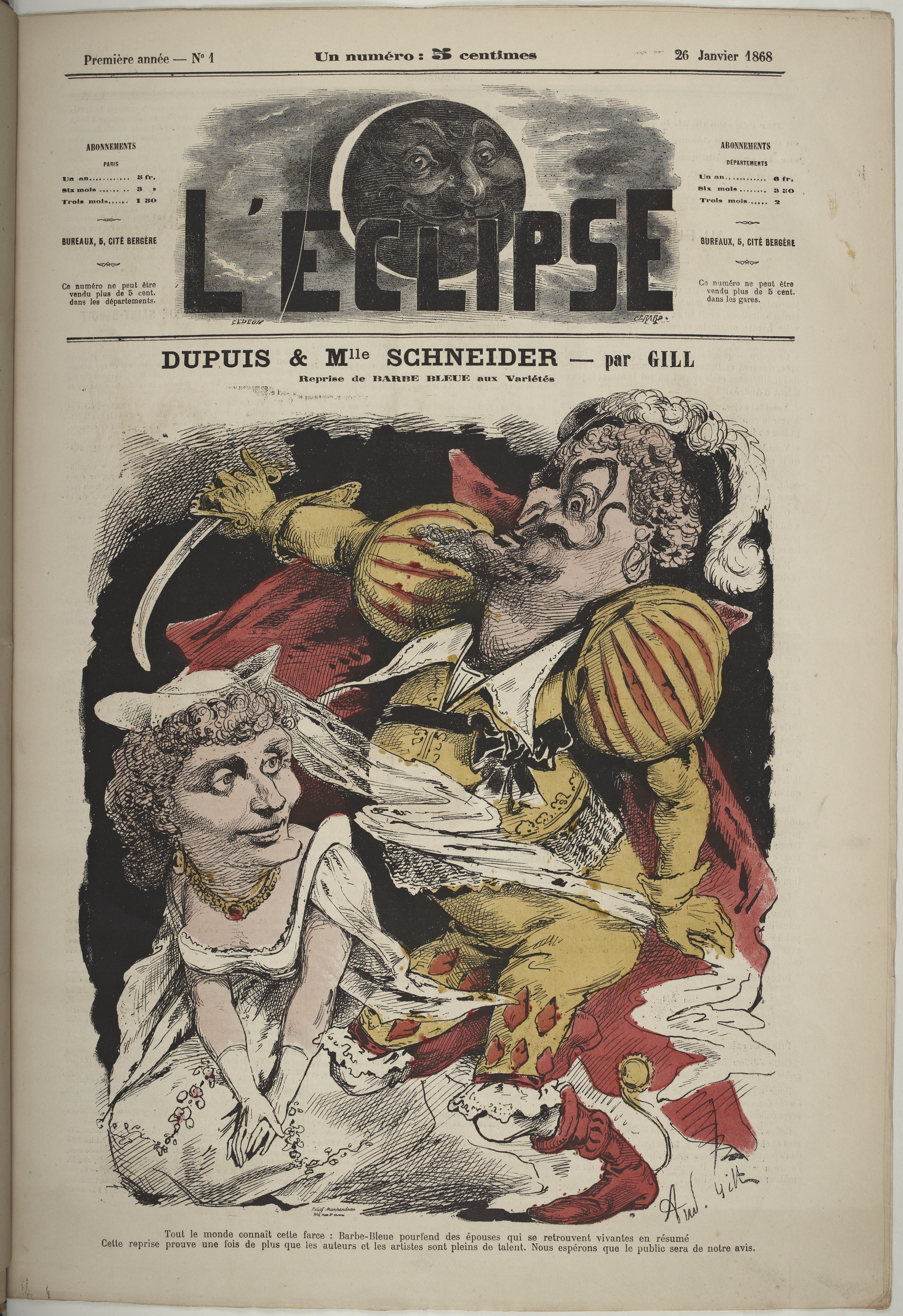
Cover of L'Eclipse 26 January 1868, with cartoon by Gill of Dupuis and Schneider

Role	Voice type	Premiere cast, 5 February 1866, (Conductor: Offenbach)
Barbe-Bleue	tenor	José Dupuis
Boulotte, a peasant woman	mezzo-soprano	Hortense Schneider
Popolani, an alchemist in the service of Barbe-Bleue	baritone	Henri Couder
King Bobèche	tenor	Jean-Laurent Kopp
Princess Hermia, daughter of the king (In Act 1, Fleurette, a peasant girl)	soprano	Georgette Vernet
Oscar, the King's minister	bass	Pierre-Eugène Grenier
Prince Saphir	tenor	Paul Hittemans
Queen Clémentine	mezzo-soprano	Aline Duval
Alvarez, a courtier of the King	tenor	Edouard Hamburger
Héloïse, a wife of Barbe-Bleue	soprano	de Géraudon
Eléonore, a wife of Barbe-Bleue	mezzo-soprano	Martin
Isaure, a wife of Barbe-Bleue	mezzo-soprano	Gabrielle
Rosalinde, a wife of Barbe-Bleue	soprano	Amélie
Blanche, a wife of Barbe-Bleue	soprano	Berthe Legrand
First peasant woman	soprano	Béatrix
Second peasant woman	soprano	Léonie
First page	soprano	Jenny
Second page	soprano	Taillefer
A clerk	spoken	Horton
A child	spoken	Mathilde
Peasants, Barbe-Bleue's guards, courtiers, pages and Bobèche's guards

== Synopsis ==
=== Act 1 ===
SCENE: A small rural village with the castle of Squire Bluebeard prominent

King Bobèche, not wanting a girl as his heir, abandoned his daughter Hermia when she was three years old. Now aged eighteen and living as a shepherdess under the assumed name Fleurette, she is in love with the young and attractive shepherd boy Saphir but is not happy that he has not yet proposed marriage to her. The King's chamberlain Oscar discovers that the shepherdess "Fleurette" is really the Princess Hermia and requires her to return to the King's court, which however means she must leave the boy she loves. Squire Bluebeard has recently lost his fifth wife and sends his alchemist Popolani to the village to find a virginal young peasant girl to become his sixth wife. Popolani decides to choose a wife for the squire by holding a raffle, but the winner turns out to be the anything but virginal Boulotte. Bluebeard is delighted with his new wife.

=== Act 2 ===
SCENE ONE: The royal palace

King Bobèche wants to increase his glory and is practicing court etiquette. He is delighted to welcome his long lost daughter back to his side and to find her a royal bridegroom. Fleurette resists any thought of marriage until she discovers, to her joy, that her intended mate is Saphir, not a shepherd boy as she had thought, but a prince who had disguised himself as such to be near her, since he was madly besotted by her. Squire Bluebeard comes to pay King Bobèche a visit and to show off his new wife Boulotte, but is instantly smitten by Princess Hermia.

SCENE TWO: Popolani's dungeon

Bluebeard orders Popolani to dispose of his new wife Boulotte as, he thinks, Popolani has disposed of all his previous wives by poisoning them, so that Bluebeard can marry Hermia. But Popolani has only been pretending to kill Bluebeard's wives, in fact he has only been giving them sleeping pills, not poison, and they have all been living in comfortable apartments. Bluebeard witnesses, in the midst of a storm, what he thinks is the murder of his latest wife Boulotte, but after she wakes up from the sleeping potion, the feisty young lady leads the other "dead" wives in a march on the castle.

=== Act 3 ===
SCENE: The chapel in the royal palace

Hermia and Saphir are entering the chapel for their marriage when Bluebeard interrupts the procession and demands by force of arms, having the palace surrounded by his military forces, that Hermia be surrendered to him as his seventh wife, Boulotte, as he thinks, having died. But he is embarrassed by the selfsame Boulotte turning up leading in a furious procession of his other "dead" wives. They are accompanied by five lords who were also supposedly put to death for having flirted with Queen Clémentine. The solution is found- the "dead" lords will marry the "dead" wives, Bluebeard will stay with Boulotte and the marriage of Hermia and Saphir can proceed.

== Recordings ==
Year	Cast: Barbe-Bleue, Boulotte, Popolani, King Bobèche, Fleurette/Hermia, Count Oscar, Prince Saphir, Queen Clémentine	Conductor, opera house and orchestra	Language	Label
1958	Michèl Sénéchal, Fanély Revoil, Charles Daguerressar, Duvaleix, Claudine Collart, André Balbon, Joseph Peyron, Deva Dassy	Marcel Cariven, Orchestre et Choral Lyrique de l'O.R.T.F.	French	Audio CD: Malibran Cat: MR705
1967	Henri Legay, Lina Dachary, Aimé Doniat, René Lenoty, Monique Stiot, René Terrasson, Bernard Alvi, Christine Gayraud	Jean Doussard, Orchestre et Choral Lyrique de l'O.R.T.F.	French	Audio CD: Opera D'Oro Cat: B00001R3NB
1973	Hanns Nocker, Anny Schlemm, Rudolf Asmus, Werner Enders, Ingrid Czerny, Helmut Polze, Manfred Hopp, Ruth Schob-Lipka	Karl-Fritz Voigtmann, Orchestra and Chorus of the Komische Oper, Berlin, stage direction by Walter Felsenstein	German	DVD/Blu-Ray: Arthaus Musik Cat: NTSC109437
2007	Peter Foltz, Jessie Wright Martin, Jacob Allen, Gary Moss, Betha Christopher, Patrick Howle, Michael Denos, Sahara Glassener-Boles	Michael Borowitz, Orchestra and Chorus of the Ohio Light Opera, Wooster, Ohio	English	CD: Albany Records Cat: TROY993-94
2019	Yann Beuron, Héloïse Mas, Christophe Gay, Christophe Mortagne, Jennifer Courcier, Thibault de Damas, Carl Ghazarossian, Aline Martin	Michele Spotti, Orchestra and Chorus of the Opéra de Lyon, stage direction by Laurent Pelly	French	DVD/Blu-Ray: Opus Arte Cat: OA1336D/OABD7290D

== See also ==
- Recordings which appear on operadis-opera-discography.org.uk
- Libretto in WikiSource
