= La Grande-Duchesse de Gérolstein =

1867 opéra bouffe by Jacques Offenbach

Jacques Offenbach by Nadar, c. 1860s

La Grande-Duchesse de Gérolstein (The Grand Duchess of Gerolstein) is an opéra bouffe (a form of operetta), in three acts and four tableaux by Jacques Offenbach to an original French libretto by Henri Meilhac and Ludovic Halévy. The story is a satirical critique of unthinking militarism and concerns a spoiled and tyrannical young Grand Duchess who learns that she cannot always get her way.

The opera premiered in Paris in 1867 and starred Hortense Schneider in the title role. Thereafter, it was heard in New York, London and elsewhere, and it is still performed and recorded.

== Background ==
Offenbach's career was at its height in the 1860s with the premieres of some of his most popular and enduring works, such as La Belle Hélène (1864) and La Vie parisienne (1866). With the original production of the latter still running, Offenbach and his librettists hurried to prepare a new opera, La Grande-Duchesse de Gérolstein, to play during the Paris Exposition (Exposition universelle) of 1867. Offenbach assisted Meilhac and Halévy in shaping the libretto. They were eager to ensure a hit, and so they engaged the immensely popular Hortense Schneider, who had created the title role in La Belle Hélène, among other Offenbach roles, paying her the extraordinarily rich monthly sum of 4,500 francs. Schneider, in addition to her vocal gifts, was well able to portray the commanding and saucy character of the Grand Duchess, which parodied Catherine the Great.

The April 1867 premiere was an immediate hit, and a parade of European royalty, drawn to Paris by the Exposition, attended performances of the operetta. Among those attending were French emperor Napoleon III; the future King Edward VII of the United Kingdom; Tsar Alexander II of Russia and his son Grand Duke Vladimir; Franz-Joseph, Emperor of Austria-Hungary; Otto von Bismarck, the Prime Minister of Prussia; and other crowned heads, generals, and ministers. Of the military satire in the piece, Bismarck remarked, "C'est tout-à-fait ça !" (That's exactly how it is!)

Three years later the Franco-Prussian War broke out, and the operetta was later banned in France, because of its antimilitarism, after the French defeat.

== Performance history ==
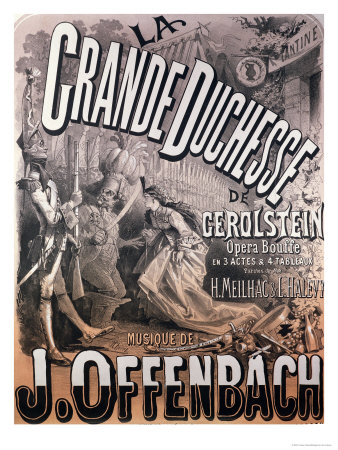
1868 Jules Chéret poster

=== 19th century ===
The opera was first performed at the Théâtre des Variétés in Paris on 12 April 1867 and starred Hortense Schneider as the Duchess, who was highly successful in the title role. The work was given at the Theater an der Wien, Vienna, in a German version by Julius Hopp on 13 May 1867, starring Marie Geistinger, and at the Friedrich-Wilhelmstädtisches Theater, Berlin on 10 January 1868.

The piece was first heard in New York City, in French, in September 1867 at the Théâtre Français, where it ran for six months. In November 1867 the opera appeared at Covent Garden, in an English translation by Charles Lamb Kenney, starring Julia Matthews in the title role; subsequent tours of that production starred Mrs Howard Paul and later Emily Soldene. The following year, making her London debut, Schneider triumphed in the role, in the first of several visits to the British capital.

The opera was produced in English in New York City at the New York Theatre in 1868, at Wood's Museum and Metropolitan beginning on 14 November 1870, and at the Union Square Theatre from 3 July 1872. In 1869 the work was revived in Paris, with Zulma Bouffar in the lead. The opera was seen in Australia in 1873, starring Alice May, who also took the title role at the Gaiety Theatre, London in 1876. Several productions were staged in New York in the early 1890s, the first one at the Casino Theatre. Another English adaptation was presented at the Savoy Theatre in London by the D'Oyly Carte Opera Company in 1897–98 with a new translation by Charles Brookfield and lyrics by Adrian Ross, starring Florence St. John, Florence Perry, Walter Passmore and Henry Lytton. The production ran for 104 performances, and was reviewed as vivacious, but sanitised and "prudish".

There were revivals in Paris at the Variétés in the 1880s and 1890s, with stars including Jeanne Granier.

=== 20th century and beyond ===
Productions during the 20th century included one at Daly's Theatre in London in 1937. In the U.S., there were several presentations by the Santa Fe Opera in 1971, which were repeated in 1972, 1974, 1979 and 2013. The singers for Santa Fe included Huguette Tourangeau in the title role in 1972, and Donald Gramm and Richard Stilwell in both 1971 and 1972. Emmanuel Villaume conducted in 2013, with Susan Graham in the title role. A 1978 production was given at the Collegiate Theatre in London, produced by Park Lane Opera, starring Patricia Routledge and David Hillman, and conducted by Vilém Tauský. A French production starring Régine Crespin was televised in 1980, and New York City Opera mounted the piece in 1982.

The first performance of the Keck critical edition, which restored Offenbach's orchestration and opened the many cuts which had occurred in the score over the years, in particular to the long Act II finale, was given by Opéra du Rhin at the Strasbourg Théâtre Municipal in December 2003, conducted by Jérôme Pillemont.

A production was designed and staged by Laurent Pelly in 2004 at the Théâtre du Châtelet in Paris. It was conducted by Marc Minkowski and starred Felicity Lott, Sandrine Piau and Yann Beuron. Minkowski restored several numbers cut after the first production. A CD and a DVD of the production were made, and it was televised in France in 2004. Opera Philadelphia also mounted a production in 2004, starring Stephanie Blythe. Los Angeles Opera produced the piece in 2005, conducted by Emmanuel Villaume and starring Frederica von Stade, in a new version adapted and directed by Garry Marshall. Theater Basel had a production under Hervé Niquet with Anne Sofie von Otter in the title role in 2009. In 2011, both Opera Boston (starring Stephanie Blythe) and the Comic Opera Guild, near Detroit, Michigan presented the work.

== Roles ==
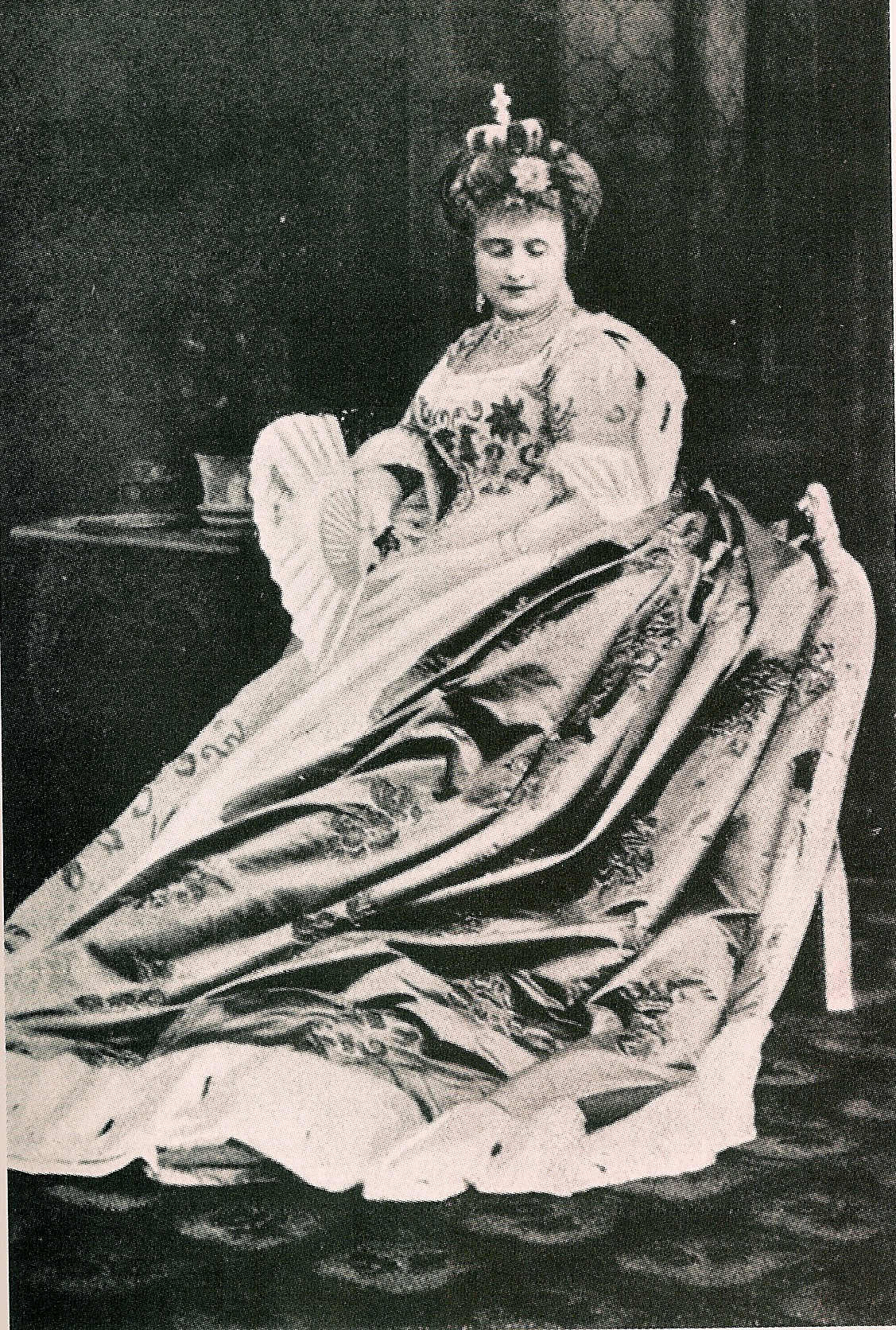
Hortense Schneider as La Grande Duchesse

Role	Voice type	Premiere Cast, 12 April 1867, (Conductor: Jacques Offenbach)
Grand Duchess	mezzo-soprano	Hortense Schneider
Fritz	tenor	José Dupuis
Wanda	soprano	Émilie Garait
General Boum	baritone	Henri Couderc
Prince Paul	tenor	Pierre-Eugène Grenier
Baron Puck	bass	Jean-Laurent Kopp
Baron Grog	bass	Louis Baron
Népomuc, an aide-de-camp	tenor	Emmanuel Ronger, 'Gardel-Hervé'
Iza, a maid of honor	soprano	Berthe Legrand
Amélie, a maid of honor	mezzo-soprano	Véron
Olga, a maid of honor	soprano	Morosini
Charlotte, a maid of honor	mezzo-soprano	Marcourt
Officers, Soldiers, Musiciens, Drummers, Peasants, Cantinières, Maids of Honour, Courtiers, Pages, Bailiffs

== Synopsis ==
Place: The fictional duchy of Gérolstein
Time: 1720

=== Act 1 ===
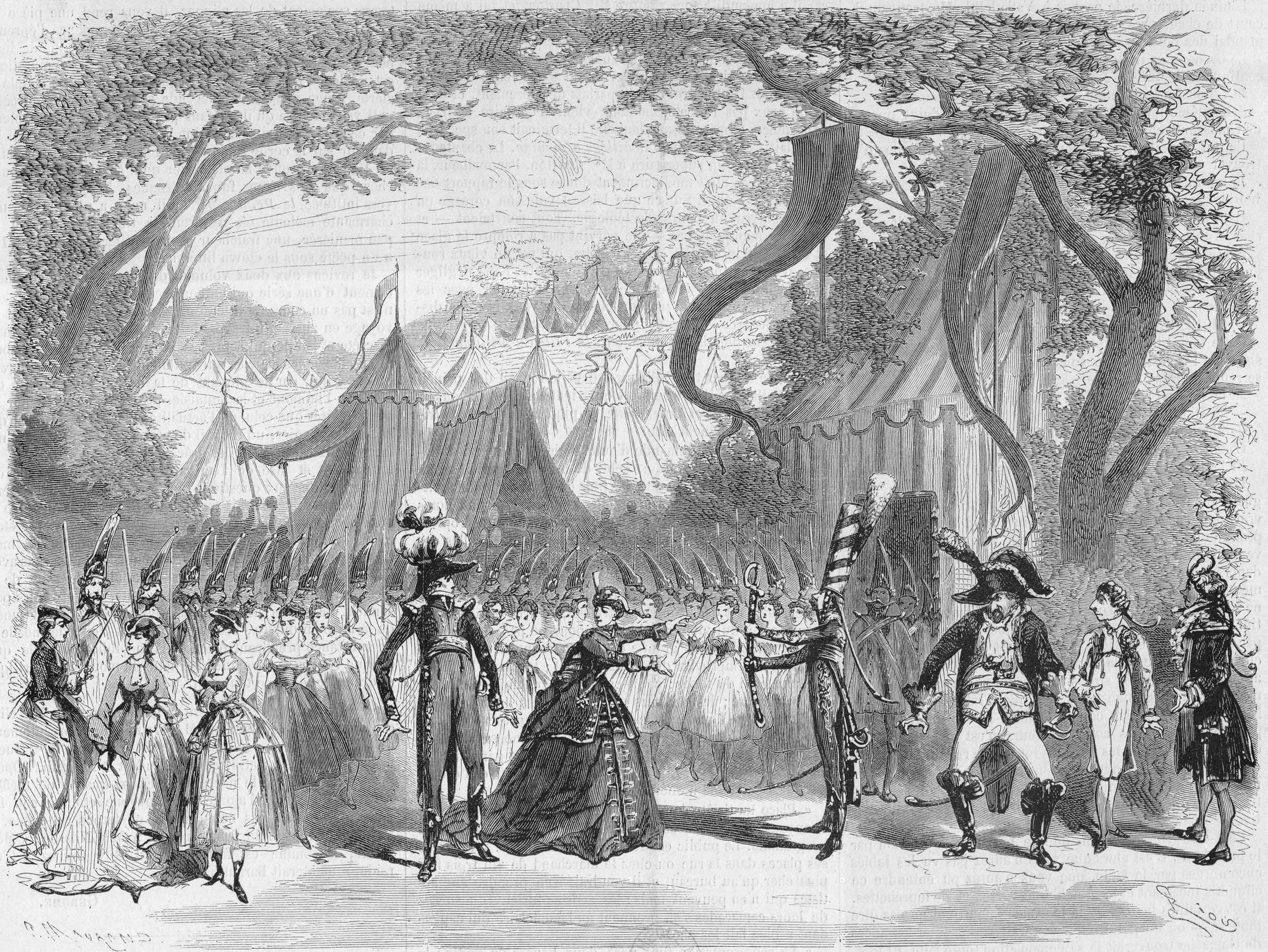
Press illustration of Act 1 in the original production

The 20-year-old Grand Duchess, who has been brought up by her tutor and court chamberlain Baron Puck to have her own way, is charming, though a veritable tyrant. She has been betrothed to the foppish Prince Paul but does not find him to her liking and, owing to her being in an unhappy state of mind over the affair, the Baron generates a war to amuse her. She decides to review her troops. There is a roll of drums, and the cry is started that the enemy is advancing, but it turns out to be her Highness.

This visit proves fateful, for she falls desperately in love with the manly, handsome soldier Fritz, whose main passions in life are his love for the pretty Wanda and his hatred of General Boum. The Duchess immediately makes Fritz a corporal, and as she grows more and more delighted with him, he is promoted rapidly to sergeant, lieutenant and captain. Finally, to spite the General, she makes him commander-in-chief and sends him to conquer the enemy.

=== Act 2 ===
Fritz wins the battle easily by making the whole opposing army drunk, his artillery consisting of 300,000 well-filled bottles. When he returns, crowned with victory, the delighted Duchess finds herself more enamored of him than ever, and hints at the possibility of his receiving other honors. However, she finds him a great blockhead in the matter, for he shows that he prefers his Wanda to such distinctions, and he incurs the Duchess's great displeasure by asking permission to marry Wanda at once. This proves the death-blow to the Duchess' devotion, and she conspires to assassinate Fritz upon his return from the wedding ceremony.

=== Act 3 ===
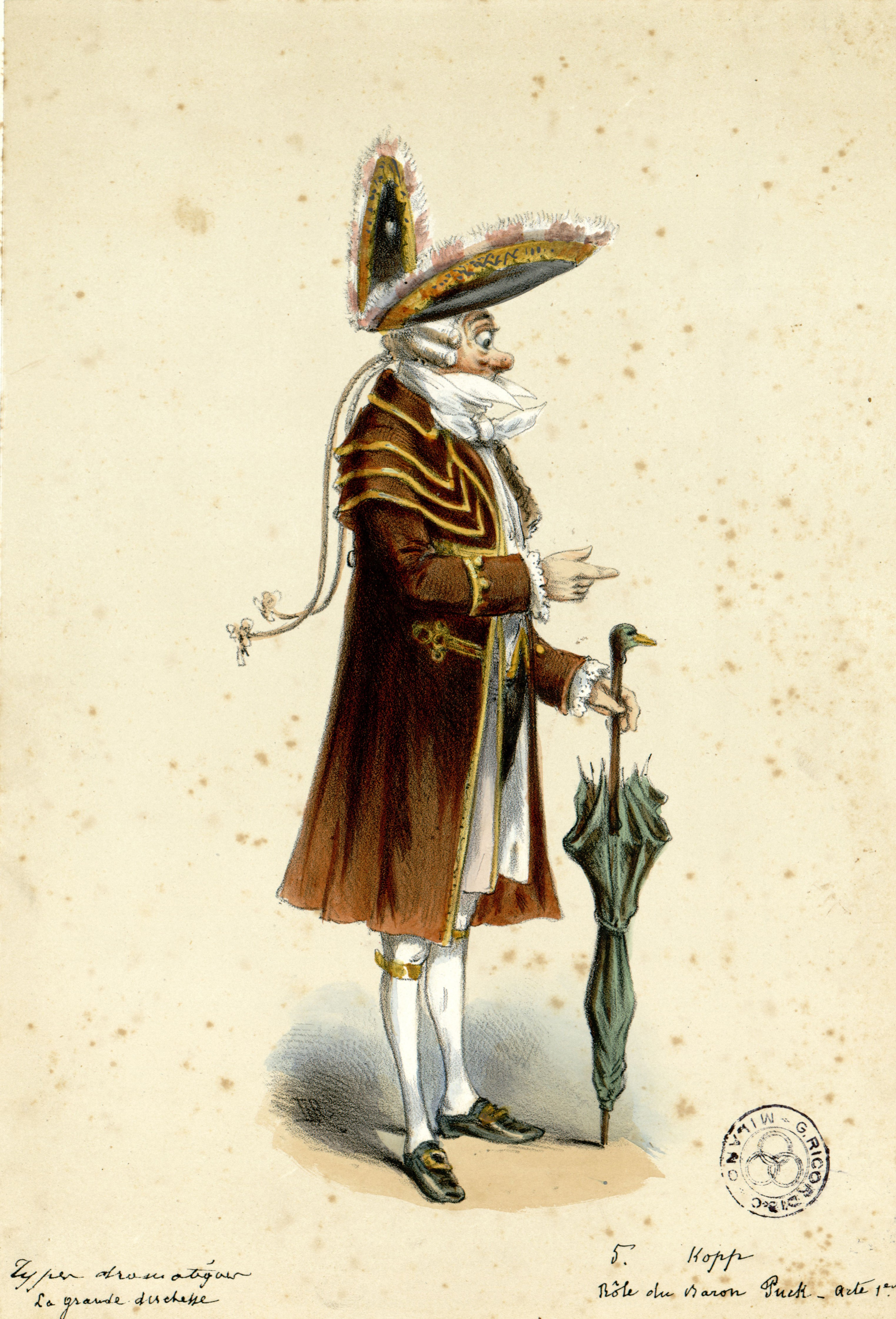
Kop, costume design for La Grand Duchesse de Gérolstein act 1 (1867).

When everything is ready for the bloody deed, however, the Duchess changes her mind, which is now busied with a new affair with the Baron Grog. Her love life seems to be forever ill-starred, however, for this latest romance is blighted by the news that her beloved has a wife and four children. The Duchess becomes philosophic and decides to marry her original betrothed, Prince Paul, after all. To quote her own words, "What can one do? If you can't have those you could love, you must try to love those you can have."

Instead of assassinating Fritz, the Duchess devises the lesser punishment of noisy serenades during his wedding night, and then hurries him off on a false alarm to fight the enemy. The enemy proves to be a jealous husband who mistakes him for another man and gives him a caning. Fritz is stripped of his military ranks, but he can now leave the army, return to Wanda, and become a village schoolmaster, albeit a rather illiterate one. General Boum is made happy by the restoration of his command; Baron Puck is reinstated to the royal favor from which he had meanwhile fallen; Baron Grog is sent home safe to his wife and four children; and Prince Paul is happily restored as the Duchess's bridegroom.

== Musical numbers ==
=== Act 1 ===
Number	Name	Character(s)
0	Overture	Orchestra
1 a)	En attendant que l'heure sonne	Chorus (soldiers, peasant girls)
1 b)	Song and Waltz	Fritz and chorus (soldiers, peasant girls)
1 c)	Piff, paff, pouff	General Boum and men's chorus (soldiers)
2	Me voici, me voici!	Fritz and Wanda
3 a)	Portez armes	Chorus
3 b)	Rondo	Grand Duchess and chorus (soldiers)
4	Regimental Song	Fritz, Grand Duchess and chorus
5	Newspaper Report	Prince Paul and Grand-Duchess
6 a)	Ils vont tous partir	Grand Duchess, Fritz, Wanda, Prince Paul, General Boum, Baron Puck and chorus
6 b)	Couplets of the saber: Voici le sabre de mon père	Grand Duchess and chorus
6 c)	Finale	Grande Duchess, Fritz, Wanda, Prince Paul, General Boum, Baron Puck and chorus

=== Act 2 ===
Number	Name	Character(s)
7	Entracte	Orchestra
8 a)	Enfin la guerre est terminée	Chorus (maids of honor)
8 b)	Couplets of the letters: Je t'ai sur mon coeur	Chorus (maids of honor), Iza, Olga, Amélie, Charlotte (maids of honor) and Népomuc
9 a)	Après la victoire	Grand Duchess, Fritz and chorus (courtiers)
9 b)	Rondo: En très bon ordre nous partîmes	Fritz
10	Declaration: Oui, général/Dites-lui qu'on l'a remarqué	Grand Duchess and Fritz
10 (reprise)	Melodrama	Orchestra
11	Trio of the plot	Prince Paul, General Boum, Baron Puck
12	Melodrama	Orchestra

=== Act 3 ===
Number	Name	Character(s)
13	Entracte	Orchestra
14	O, grandes leçons du passé	Grand Duchess and General Boum
15 a)	Conspiracy scene	Men's chorus, Prince Paul, General Boum, Népomuc and Baron Puck
15 b)	Song of the knife-sharpeners	Men's chorus, Baron Grog, Prince Paul, General Boum, Népomuc and Baron Puck
9 (reprise)	Melodrama	Orchestra
16	Nuptial song	Chorus
17	Bonne nuit	Wanda, Fritz, Baron Puck, Prince Paul, Népomuc, General Boum, Baron Grog, chorus
18 a)	Couplets of the newlyweds	Wanda and Fritz
18 b)	Ouvrez, ouvrez!	Wanda, Fritz, Baron Puck, Prince Paul, General Boum, Baron Grog, chorus
18 c)	A cheval!	Wanda, Fritz, Baron Puck, Prince Paul, Népomuc, General Boum, Baron Grog, chorus
19	Entracte	Orchestra
20 a)	Wedding chorus	Grand Duchess, Baron Puck, Prince Paul, Népomuc, General Boum, Baron Grog and chorus
20 b)	Toasting couplets	Grand Duchess and chorus
21	The General's Lament	Wanda, Fritz, General Boum, Baron Puck, Prince Paul, Baron Grog, Népomuc, Grand Duchess and chorus
22	Finale	Wanda, Fritz, Baron Puck, Prince Paul, General Boum, Baron Grog, Grand Duchess and chorus

== Recordings ==
Among the recordings of the work, critics have praised a 1977 CBS issue conducted by Michel Plasson with Régine Crespin as the Grand Duchess. An older mono recording under René Leibowitz with Eugenia Zareska, though heavily cut, was well received when reissued on compact disc in 1982. A 2006 release from Virgin Classics conducted by Marc Minkowski with Felicity Lott contains much music cut after the first night and restored in Jean-Christophe Keck's critical edition, including what the critic Andrew Lamb describes as "a substantial (and glorious) Act 2 finale".
