= Le carrosse du Saint-Sacrement =

Play by Prosper Mérimée

Le carrosse du Saint-Sacrement is an 1829 one act play by Prosper Mérimée. It was published in la Revue de Paris in June 1829 and added to the second edition of Le Théâtre de Clara Gazul in 1830. The comedy was first produced at the Comédie-Française only on March 13, 1850, by which time the novelty of Mérimée's comedies had worn off and it was not presented again until many years later.

== Works based on the play ==
- La Périchole, opéra-bouffe by Jacques Offenbach, libretto by Henri Meilhac et Ludovic Halévy, 1868
- Le carrosse du Saint-Sacrement, opera by Lord Berners, 1923
- Le carrosse du Saint-Sacrement, opera by Henri Büsser, 1948
- The Golden Coach (French: Le Carrosse d'or; Italian: La carrozza d'oro), film directed by Jean Renoir, 1952
