= Henri Meilhac =

French dramatist and opera librettist (1830–1897)

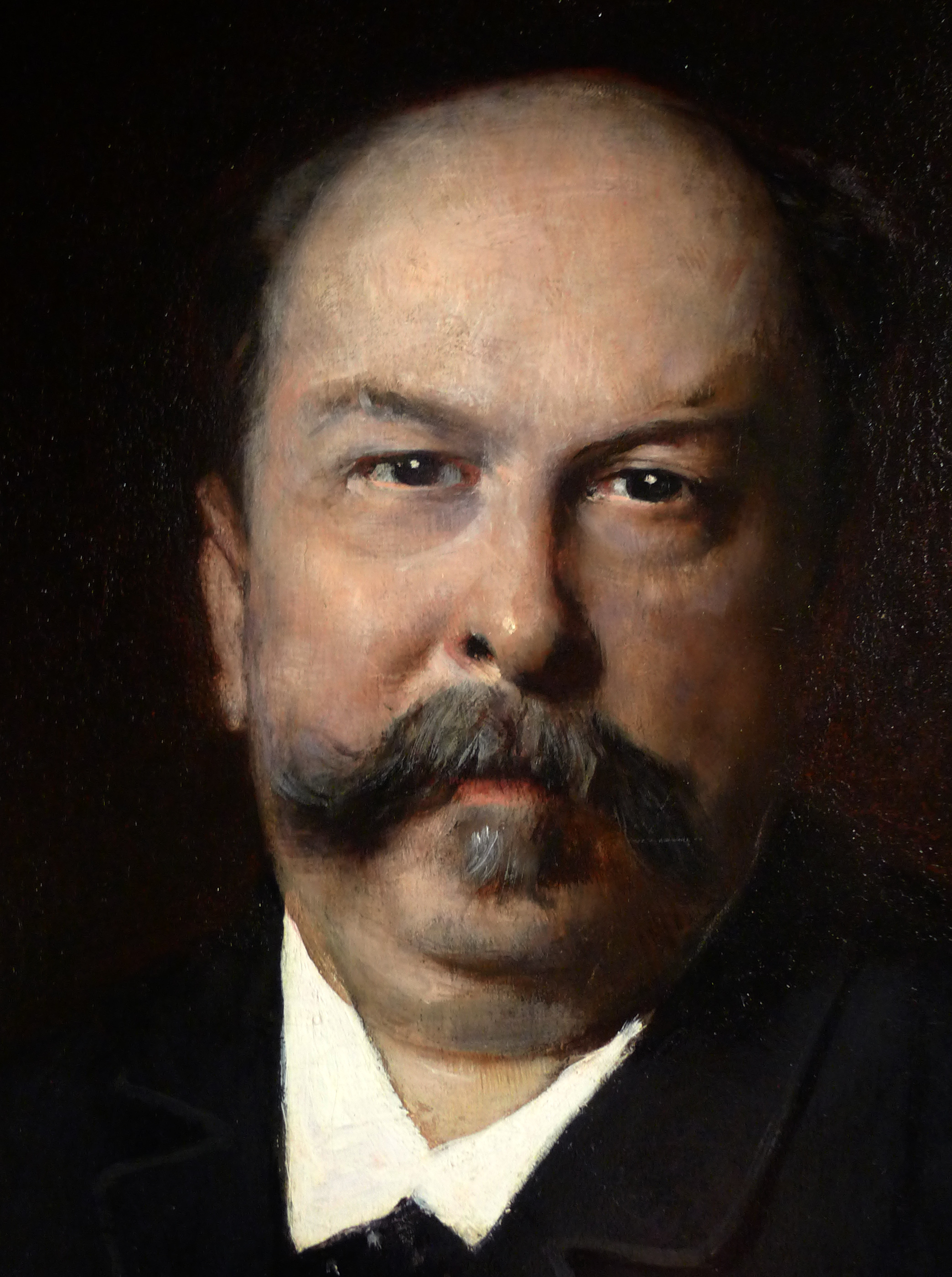
- Meilhac by Jules-Élie Delaunay, c. 1880
- Born: 23 February 1830; Paris, France
- Died: 6 June 1897 (aged 67); Paris, France
- Occupation: Playwright

Henri Meilhac (French: [ɑ̃ʁi mɛjak]; 23 February 1830 – 6 July 1897) was a prolific French playwright and opera librettist, known for his collaborations with Ludovic Halévy on comic operas with music by Jacques Offenbach. He also wrote occasionally for serious works including Georges Bizet's Carmen (with Halévy) and Jules Massenet's Manon.

Born in Paris, Meilhac began writing for a humorous magazine in 1852, and four years later he began a career as a playwright. In 1860 he collaborated for the first time with Halévy, an old schoolfriend, on a one-act comedy, presented at the Théâtre des Variétés. Over the next twenty-one years the two co-wrote fifty more stage works.

After Halévy retired in 1882 Meilhac continued to write, sometimes as sole author and sometimes with collaborators. His tally of stage works is more than a hundred, and includes short and full-length comic plays and the libretti of twenty-five operettas. He and Halévy wrote the libretti for Offenbach's La belle Hélène (1864), La vie parisienne (1866), La Grande-Duchesse de Gérolstein (1867) and La Périchole (1868). In addition Meilhac provided libretti for operettas by Charles Lecocq, Hervé, Gaston Serpette and Robert Planquette.

== Life and career ==
=== Early years ===
Meilhac was born in Paris on 23 February 1830, the son of François Meilhac, a painter, and his wife, Antoinette née Chomé. He was educated at the Lycée Louis-le-Grand in Paris, where he did not distinguish himself as a scholar but found a lifelong friend in a fellow student, Ludovic Halévy.

After leaving school he worked as a commercial clerk in bookselling, and then began to write for a living, contributing articles and drawings to the Journal pour rire from 1852 to 1855. He made his theatrical debut in 1856, with a one-act comédie en vaudevilles, La Sarabande du Cardinal, with a cast of five, and music by Sylvain Mangeant, given at the Théâtre du Palais-Royal in May. He wrote a further seven comedies between then and 1860, when he began to work with co-authors, as was frequently done in the French theatre of the time. His first collaborator was Germain Delavigne but in 1860 he teamed up with his friend Halévy to write a one-act comedy, Ce qui plait les hommes (What Men Like), presented at the Théâtre des Variétés on 20 April 1861. Between then and 1881 the two collaborated on a further fifty stage works, in between working alone or with other co-authors. A biographer of Meilhac has written:

Both writers recorded that their cooperation was easy and friendly; Meilhac displayed the freer imagination and the more unbridled comic verve in the creation of shameless parody and uproarious satire, while Halévy developed ideas within a craftsmanlike dramatic framework.

The critic Henry Fouquier wrote in 1897, "It is agreed that Meilhac was the bold inventor and the audaciously fanciful, while M. Halévy remained the skilful, wise, and level-headed man of the theatre, and the writer of moderation and taste.

=== Librettist ===
Sketch of first performance of La belle Hélène

Meilhac's first libretto for a comic opera was for Louis Deffès' Les Bourguignonnes, given at the Opéra-Comique in July 1861; with Halévy, he had a huge hit with his next: Offenbach's La belle Hélène (1864). Grove's Dictionary of Music and Musicians says of Halévy and Meilhac:

Their achievement lay to a considerable extent in exploiting to the full the existing forms of opéra comique with its combination of music and speech, its transparently artificial plot and its topicality, which often found expression in irreverent parody. ... Situations are contrived for concerted numbers, especially at the ends of acts, and solos and ensembles are both energetic and varied. The versification of the lyrics is deft, rhyme and vocabulary are amusing, and sentiments are expressed clearly. The spoken dialogues are crisp and laconic, sometimes colloquial and never pompous except in jest. with these means Halévy and Meilhac mocked everything they observed around them in a Second Empire society that took itself too seriously.

The three followed La belle Hélène with two more great successes: La vie parisienne (1866) and La Grande-Duchesse de Gérolstein (1867). Le château à Toto (1868) did less well at the box-office, but La Périchole (1868) was another success. It was based on Le carrosse du Saint-Sacrement, a comedy by Prosper Mérimée, who was to feature again in Meilhac and Halévy's work four years later. Their last two collaborations with Offenbach in the 1860s – La diva (1869) and Les brigands (1869) – were less successful. The Franco-Prussian War of 1870–71 and the downfall of the Second Empire caused a strong reaction against Offenbach from the public, who identified him with the fallen regime. He left the country for a time, taking refuge in London and Vienna.

Other composers for whom Meilhac wrote or co-wrote comic opera libretti were Jules Cohen, Auguste Durand, Clémence de Grandval, Hervé, Charles Lecocq, Gaston Serpette and Robert Planquette. He was a posthumous contributor to Franz Lehár's operetta The Merry Widow in 1895: it was based on Meilhac's 1861 comedy Attaché d'ambassade (Embassy Attaché) adapted without permission. (Note: The Meilhac estate sued for breach of copyright and his heirs were awarded a share of the French royalties.)

=== Carmen and later ===
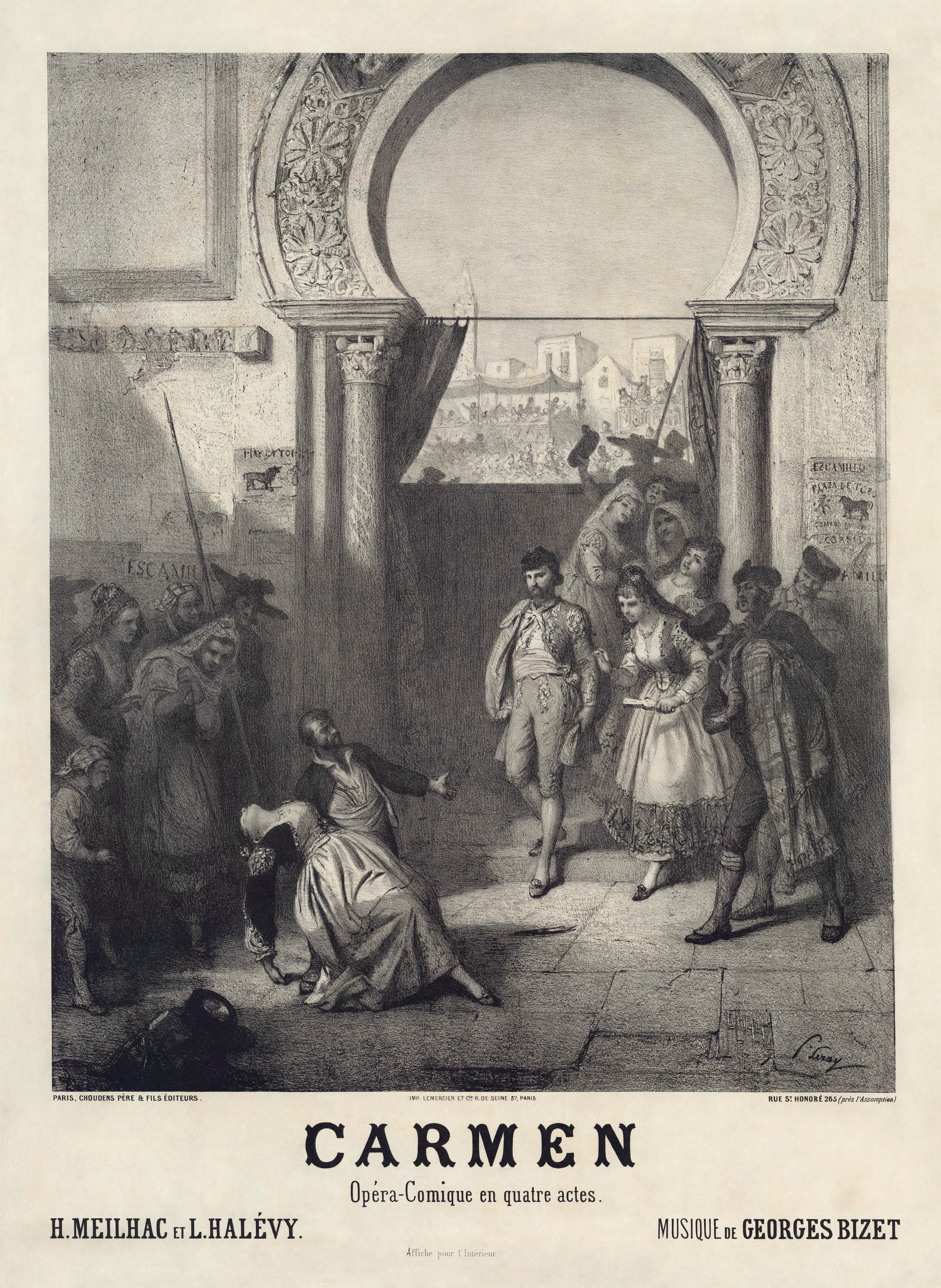
Poster for the première of Carmen

Although the two librettists were known for their comedies, in 1872 they undertook what was, for them, an unusual assignment. Halévy's cousin Geneviève (daughter of Fromental) was married to Bizet, whom the directors of the Opéra-Comique invited to write an opera in collaboration with Halévy and Meilhac. The librettists were enthusiastic about the composer's preference for a plot based on Mérimée's story Carmen; they provided a libretto with the requisite tragic ending. Nonetheless, they regarded the piece as a side venture. Just before the premiere, Halévy wrote:

There are some very, very lovely and charming things in the score, and I dare hope for a happy evening for Bizet. His interests alone matter in this instance. The thing has little importance for Meilhac and me.

The management of the Opéra-Comique was uneasy about presenting a piece with a tragic and violent ending, and Meilhac unsuccessfully urged Bizet to resist killing Carmen off at the end of the last act. Their predictions of a failure proved accurate: the piece completed its scheduled run of forty-eight performances, but played to small audiences. Grove comments on the librettists' efforts for Carmen: "perhaps the most famous product of the Halévy-Meilhac collaboration, but not a very typical one ... There is some justice in the complaint that the remarkable style of Mérimée’s original narrative is lost".

This was the pair's only joint venture into tragedy. They wrote seven more libretti together, of which three were for Offenbach and four for Lecocq. When Offenbach returned to Paris from his voluntary exile he collaborated with Halévy and Meilhac on revised versions of La vie parisienne and La Perichole; the three collaborators' final work together was an opéra bouffe, La boulangère a des écus.(1875). Thereafter Halévy and Meilhac provided libretti for four opéras comiques with music by Lecocq: Le petit duc (1878), La petite mademoiselle (1879), Janot (1881) and La rousotte (1881), in the last of which there was also music by Hervé and Marius Boullard. They were unwitting contributors to Johann Strauss's 1874 Die Fledermaus, which plagiarised the plot of their 1872 comedy Le Réveillon (New Year's Eve). They refused to allow the operetta to be produced in France. (Note: Strauss's music was heard in Paris in 1877 with a completely new libretto by Alfred Delacour and Victor Wilder, retitled La Tzigane (The Gypsy), although, as Les Annales du théâtre et de la musique commented, the piece had "absolutely nothing gypsy, either in its melodies or in its costumes". It was not until 1904 that the version based on the original Meilhac and Halévy comedy was seen in Paris.)

=== Last years ===
After Halévy retired in 1882, Meilhac wrote two serious libretti for operas by Jules Massenet (Manon, 1884, with Philippe Gille) and Leo Delibes (Kassya, 1893, with Gille). He continued to write comedies; his most frequent collaborators were Gille and Albert de Saint-Albin.

In 1888, Meilhac was elected to the Académie française, joining Halévy, who was elected in 1881. He died in Paris on 6 July 1897, aged sixty-seven. After his death a London newspaper reported that at one time he had fourteen of his plays running simultaneously in Paris. In Le Figaro Henry Fouquier wrote, "As it was said of Rossini that he was not a musician, but was 'Music', we can say of Meilhac that he was the Theatre itself ... the very expression of the disrespectful, witty and good-natured scepticism of the happy days of the Empire".

== Stage works ==
Title	Genre	Acts	Co-authors	Composer	Theatre	Date
La sarabande du cardinal (The Cardinal's Sarabande)	vaudeville	1			Palais-Royal	29 May 1856
Satania	vaudeville	2			Palais-Royal	10 Oct 1856
Le copiste (The Copyist)	comedy	1			Gymnase	3 Aug 1857
Péché caché (Hidden Sin)	comedy	1			Palais-Royal	11 Jan 1858
L'autographe	comedy	1			Gymnase	27 Nov 1858
Retour d'Italie (Return from Italy)	comedy	1			Gymnase	14 Aug 1859
Le petit-fils de Mascarille (Mascarille's Grandson)	comedy	5			Gymnase	8 Oct 1859
Ce qui plaît aux hommes (What Men Like)	comedy	1	Ludovic Halévy		Variétés	6 Oct 1860
Une heure avant l'ouverture (One Hour Before Opening)	vaudeville	1	Germain Delavigne		Vaudeville	31 Dec 1860
L'étincelle (The Spark)	comedy	3			Vaudeville	31 Dec 1860
Le menuet de Danaé (Danaë's Minuet)	comedy	1	Halévy		Variétés	20 Apr 1861
La vertu de Célimène (The Virtue of Célimène)	comedy	5			Gymnase	1 May 1861
Attaché d'ambassade (Embassy Attaché)	comedy	3			Vaudeville	12 Oct 1861
Le café du roi (Coffee for a King)	opéra-comique	1		Louis Deffès	Lyrique	6 Nov 1861
Les moulins à vent (The Windmills)	vaudeville	3	Halévy		Variétés	22 Feb 1862
L'échéance (The Deadline)	comedy	1	Delavigne		Gymnase	15 Mar 1862
La clé de Métella (Métella's Key)	comedy	1	Halévy		Vaudeville	24 Nov 1862
Les brebis de Panurge (Panurge's Sheep)	comedy		Halévy		Vaudeville	24 Nov 1862
Le Brésilien (The Brazilian)	vaudeville	1	Halévy		Palais-Royal	9 May 1863
Le train de minuit (The Midnight Train)	comedy	2	Halévy		Gymnase	15 Jun 1863
Les Bourguignonnes (The Burgundian Women)	opéra-comique	1		Deffês	Opéra-Comique	6 Jul 1863
Néméa	ballet	3		Ludwig Minkus	Opéra	14 Jul 1864
Cantate	-	-	Halévy	Jules Duprato	Opéra	15 Aug 1864 (Assumption and birth of Napoleon)
Les curieuses (The Nosey Parkers)	comedy	1	Delavigne		Gymnase	17 Oct 1864
La belle Hélène	opéra bouffe	3	Halévy	Jacques Offenbach	Variétés	17 Dec 64
Le photographe (The Photographer)	comedy	1	Halévy		Palais-Royal	24 Dec 1864
Le singe de Nicolet (Nicolet's Monkey)	comedy	1	Halévy		Variétés	29 Jan 1865
Fabienne	comedy	3			Gymnase	1 Sep 1865
Les méprises de Lambinet (Lambinet at Cross-purposes)	vaudeville	1	Halévy		Variétés	3 Dec 1865
Barbe-bleue (Bluebeard)	opéra bouffe	3	Halévy	Offenbach	Variétés	5 Feb 1866
José Maria	opéra-comique	3	Eugène Cormon	Jules Cohen	Opéra-Comique	6 Jul 1866
La vie parisienne (Parisian Life)	opéra bouffe	4	Halévy	Offenbach	Palais-Royal	31 Oct 1866
La Grande-Duchesse de Gérolstein	opéra bouffe	3	Halévy	Offenbach	Variétés	12 Apr 1867
Tout pour les dames (Everything for the Ladies)	vaudeville	1	Halévy		Variétés	8 Sept 1867
L'élixir de Cornélius	opéra-comique	1	Delavigne	Auguste Durand	Fantaisies	3 Feb 1868
Le château à Toto	opéra-bouffe	3	Halévy	Offenbach	Palais-Royal	6 May 1868
La pénitente	opéra-comique	1	William Busnach	Clémence de Grandval	Opéra-Comique	13 May 1868
Fanny Lear	comedy	5	Halévy		Gymnase	13 Aug 1868
La Périchole	opéra bouffe	3	Halévy	Offenbach	Variétés	6 Oct 1868
Suzanne et les deux vieillards (Suzanne and the Two Old Men)	comedy	1			Gymnase	10 Oct 1868
Le bouquet	comedy	1	Halévy		Palais-Royal	23 Oct 1868
Vert-Vert	opéra-comique	3	Charles Nuitter	Offenbach	Opéra-Comique	10 Mar 1869
La diva	opéra-bouffe	3	Halévy	Offenbach	Bouffes	22 Mar 1869
Un contrat (A Contract)	comedy	2			Vaudeville	22 Apr 1869
Homme à la clé (Man With the Key)	vaudeville	1	Halévy		Variétés	11 Aug 1869
Froufrou	comedy	5	Halévy		Gymnase	30 Oct 1869
Les brigands	opéra bouffe	3	Halévy	Offenbach	Variétés	10 Dec 1869
Tricoche et Cacolet	vaudeville	5	Halévy		Palais-Royal	6 Dec 1871
Madame attend Monsieur (Madame is Waiting for Monsieur)	comedy	1	Halévy		Variétés	8 Feb 1872
Nany	comedy	4	Émile de Najac		Comédie-Française	12 Apr 1872
Le réveillon (New Year's Eve)	comedy	3	Halévy		Palais-Royal	10 Sept 1872
Les sonnettes (The Bells)	comedy	1	Halévy		Variétés	15 Nov 1872
Le roi Candaule (King Candaule)	vaudeville	1	Halévy		Palais-Royal	9 Apr 1873
L'été de la Saint-Martin (Indian Summer)	comedy	1	Halévy		Comédie-Française	Jul 1873
Toto chez Tata	comedy	1	Halévy		Variétés	25 Aug 1873
L'opéra aux Italiens (Opera for the Italians)	comedy	1	Halévy and Busnach		Variétés	12 Feb 1874
La petite marquise	comedy	3	Halévy		Variétés	13 Feb 1874
La mi-carême (Laetare Sunday)	vaudeville	1	Halévy		Palais-Royal	2 Apr 1874
L'ingénue	comedy	1	Halévy		Variétés	24 Sep 1874
La veuve (The Widow)	comedy	3	Halévy		Gymnase	5 Nov 1874
La boule	comedy	4	Halévy		Palais-Royal	24 Oct 1874
Carmen	opéra-comique	4	Halévy (after Mérimée)	Georges Bizet	Opéra-Comique	3 Mar 1875
Le passage de Vénus (The Transit of Venus)	comedy	1	Halévy		Variétés	4 May 1875
La boulangère a des écus (The Baker has Money)	opéra bouffe	3	Halévy	Offenbach	Variétés	19 Oct 1875
La Créole	opéra comique	3	Albert Millaud	Offenbach	Bouffes	3 Nov 1875
Loulou	comedy	1	Halévy		Pal-Royal	31 Mar 1876
Le prince	comedy	4	Halévy		Pal-Royal	25 Nov 1876
La cigale (The Cricket)	comedy	3	Halévy		Variétés	6 Oct 1877
Le fandango	ballet	1	Halévy and Louis Mérante	Gaston Salvayre	Opéra	26 Nov 1877
Le Je ne sais quoi (The What-do-you-call-it)	vaudeville	1	Halévy		Renaissance	21 Jan 1878
Le petit duc	opéra-comique	3	Halévy	Charles Lecocq	Renaissance	25 Jan 1878
La cigarette	comedy	1	Charles Narrey		Gymnase	20 Apr 1878
Samuel Brohl	comedy	5	Victor Cherbuliez		Odéon	31 Jan 1879
Le mari de la débutante (The Debutante's Husband)	comedy	4	Halévy		Palais-Royal	5 Feb 1879
Le petit hôtel	comedy	1	Halévy		Comédie-Française	21 Feb 1879
La petite mademoiselle	opéra-comique	3	Halévy	Lecocq	Renaissance	12 Apr 1879
Lolotte	comedy	1	Halévy		Vaudeville	4 Oct 1879
La petite mère	comedy	3	Halévy		Variétés	6 Mar 1880
Nina la tueuse (Nina the Killer)	comedy	1	Jacques Redelsperger		Gymnase	2 Oct 1880
Janot	opéra-comique	3	Halévy	Lecocq	Renaissance	22 Jan 1881
La roussotte (The Redhead)	vaudeville-opérette	3	Halévy and Millaud	Hervé, Lecocq, Marius Boullard	Variétés	26 Jan 1881
Phryné	comedy	3			Gymnase	14 Feb 1881
Le mari à Babette (Babette's Husband)	comedy	3	Philippe Gille		Palais-Royal	31 Dec 1881
Madame le diable	féerie-op	4	Arnold Mortier	Gaston Serpette	Renaissance	5 Apr 1882
Mam'zelle Nitouche	comedy with music	3	Millaud	Hervé	Variétés	26 Jan 1883
Le nouveau régime	comedy	1	Jules Prével		Gymnase	11 May 1883
Ma camarade	comedy	5	Gille		Palais-Royal	9 Oct 1883
Manon	opéra-comique	5	Gille	Jules Massenet	Opéra-Comique	19 Jan 1884
La cosaque (The Cossack-girl)	comedy	3	Millaud	Hervé	Variétés	1 Feb 1884
La duchesse Martin	comedy	1			Comédie-Française	16 May 1884
Rip (Rip Van Winkle)	opéra-comique	3	Gille (after H. B. Farnie)	Robert Planquette	Folies-Dramatiques	11 Nov 1884
La bonne (The Maid)	vaudeville	1	Gille		Folies-Dramatiques	21 Nov 1884
La ronde du commissaire (Commissaire on Patrol)	comedy	4	Gille		Gymnase	27 Nov 1884
Les demoiselles Clochari	comedy	3			Variétés	30 Jan 1886
Gotte	comedy	4			Palais-Royal	2 Dec 1886
Décoré	comedy	3			Variétés	27 Jan 1888
Pepa	comedy	3	Louis Ganderax		Comédie-Française	31 Oct 1888
Margot	comedy	3			Comédie-Française	18 Jan 1890
Ma cousine	comedy	3			Variétés	27 Oct 1890
Monsieur l'abbé	comedy	5	Albert de Saint-Albin		Palais-Royal	18 Nov 1891
Brevet supérieur (Higher Certificate)	comedy	3			Variétés	13 Apr 1892
Kassya	opéra-comique	4	Gille	Léo Delibes, completed by Massenet	Opéra-Comique	24 Mar 1893
Leurs gigolettes (Female Gigolos)	comedy	4	Saint-Albin		Palais-Royal	9 Nov 1893
Villégiature (Holiday Resort)	comedy	1	Saint-Albin		Vaudeville	15 Jan 1894
Miguel	comedy	1			Trouville	17 Aug 1894
Panurge	opéra-comique	3	Saint-Albin	Planquette	Gaîté	22 Nov 1895
Grosse fortune	comedy	4			Comédie-Française	15 Feb 1896

Source: Nos auteurs et compositeurs dramatiques.

== Influence ==
The young Georges Feydeau sought Meilhac out and asked him to critique a play he had written. He recalled Meilhac as saying, "My boy, your play is stupid, but it is theatrical. You will be a man of the theatre". Feydeau modelled himself on Meilhac and two other predecessors: Eugène Labiche for characterisation, Alfred Hennequin for plotting, and Meilhac for polished dialogue, sounding elegant but natural.

== Notes, references and sources ==
=== Sources ===
- Faris, Alexander (1980). Jacques Offenbach. London: Faber & Faber. ISBN 978-0-571-11147-3.
- Gammond, Peter (1980). Offenbach. London: Omnibus Press. ISBN 978-0-7119-0257-2.
- Gidel, Henry (1991). Georges Feydeau (in French). Paris: Flammarion. ISBN 978-2-08-066280-4.
- Harewood, Earl of (2000). The New Kobbé's Opera Book. London: Ebury. ISBN 978-0-09-181410-6.
- Hansen, Eric (1987). Ludovic Halévy: A Study of Frivolity and Fatalism in Nineteenth-century France. Lanham: University Press of America. ISBN 978-0-81-915887-1.
- Lacombe, Hervé (2010). "L'Opéra sous le second Empire". In Jean-Claude Yon (ed.). Les spectacles sous le second Empire (in French). Paris: Armand Colin. ISBN 978-2-200-35494-7.
- McClary, Susan (2002). Georges Bizet: Carmen. Cambridge: Cambridge University Press. ISBN 978-0-52-139301-0.
- Martin, Jules (1897). Nos auteurs et compositeurs dramatiques (in French). Paris: Flammarion. OCLC 9145330.
- Noël, Édouard; Edmond Stoullig (1878). Les Annales du Théâtre et de la Musique, 1877 (in French). Paris: Charpentier. OCLC 1051558946.
- Pronko, Leonard (1975). Georges Feydeau. New York: Ungar. ISBN 978-0-8044-2700-5.
