= Ludovic Halévy =

French writer (1834–1908)

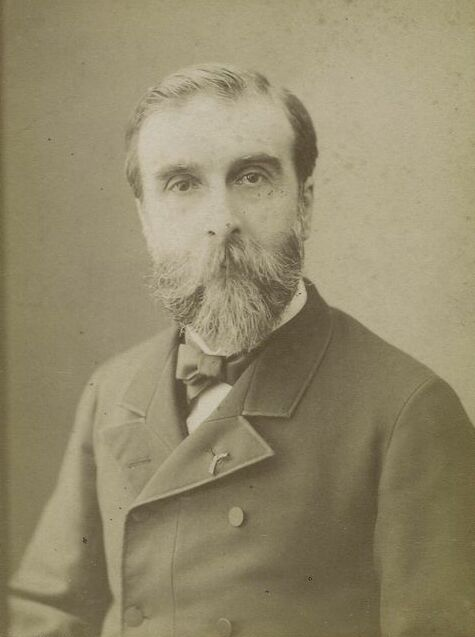
- Halévy early in his career
- Born: 1 January 1834; Paris
- Died: 7 May 1908 (aged 74); Paris
- Occupations: Author, librettist
- Children: Élie and Daniel
- Parent(s): Léon Halévy; Alexandrine Lebas
- Relatives: Lucien-Anatole Prévost-Paradol (half-brother); Élie Halévy (paternal grandfather); Louis-Hippolyte Lebas (maternal grandfather); Fromental Halévy (paternal uncle)

Ludovic Halévy (1 January 1834 – 7 May 1908) was a French author and playwright, known for his collaborations with Henri Meilhac on the libretti for Georges Bizet's Carmen and comic operas by Jacques Offenbach, including La belle Hélène (1864), La vie parisienne (1866), La Grande-Duchesse de Gérolstein (1867) and La Périchole (1868)

Born in Paris to a musical and artistic family, Halévy worked as a civil servant after leaving school, and continued to do so, while pursuing a parallel career as a playwright, librettist and novelist. He generally wrote with collaborators, including Hector Crémieux, and on two occasions, his father, but his partnership with Meilhac, an old schoolfriend, produced the works for which he is chiefly remembered.

== Life and career ==
=== Early years ===
Ludovic Halévy was born in the 10th arrondissement of Paris on 1 January 1834, the son of Léon Halévy and his wife, Louise Alexandrine, née Lebas. Léon was descended from a German Jewish family (originally Lévy) but converted to Roman Catholicism before his marriage; his wife was a member of a well-known and influential family, daughter of Louis-Hippolyte Lebas, architect of Notre-Dame-de-Lorette, Paris. Léon, whose elder brother was the composer Fromental Halévy, was a senior civil servant and a well-respected author.

In 1845 Halévy entered the Lycée Louis-le-Grand. He was an undistinguished scholar but he was well enough connected to secure admission to the French civil service after leaving school. His official career flourished but his chief interest was the theatre. Concerned that his career prospects would suffer if he were publicly associated with the theatre he adopted the pen-name Jules Servières, under which he first collaborated with the composer Jacques Offenbach. Their bouffe musicale called Madame Papillon, a one-act knockabout piece with a cast of two, opened at the Bouffes-Parisiens on 3 October 1855. Halévy abandoned the pseudonym the following January, when his real name was credited on bills for the duo's "chinoiserie musicale", Ba-ta-clan, but he returned to using it soon afterwards and did so for several years.

In 1857 Offenbach organised a competition for young composers. A jury of French composers and playwrights including Daniel Auber, Fromental Halévy, Ambroise Thomas, Charles Gounod and Eugène Scribe considered seventy-eight entries; the six short-listed entrants were all asked to set the same libretto, Le docteur miracle, written by Halévy together with Léon Battu. The joint winners were Georges Bizet and Charles Lecocq, with both of whom Halévy was later to collaborate again.

Still cautious about the effect a reputation for writing operettas might have on his career, Halévy declined to have his name on the bills for his first outstanding success with Offenbach – Orphée aux enfers – and insisted that his co-librettist, Hector Crémieux, should receive all the credit and the royalties. The piece opened on 21 October 1858 and ran for 228 performances, at a time when a run of 100 nights was considered a success.

=== 1860–1870 ===
In 1860 Halévy collaborated with his father on the libretto for Un mari sans le savoir ("A Husband Without Knowing It") with music by "Monsieur de Saint-Rémy" – in reality by the Duc de Morny who dabbled in operetta both as a librettist and as a composer. Morny's patronage worked to Halévy's advantage in his official career, and soon after the première of Un mari sans le savoir Morny arranged for Halévy's appointment as secretary to the Corps législatif.

In 1864 Halévy began a collaboration with the author Henri Meilhac which was to last until the latter's death in 1897. The two had become friends when both at the Lycée Louis-le-Grand, sharing a distaste for school life and a preference for escaping it. They were strikingly different – one biographer writes, "with Meilhac the more ebullient and fanciful, and Halévy the more staid and craftsmanlike" – but they remained close friends and now became inseparable collaborators. Accounts differ about how the partners divided the work between them. According to Siegfried Kracauer, it was always Meilhac who outlined the skeleton of the plot and sketched the big scenes and situations, which Halévy "filled in with witty comment and dialogue". Susan McClary writes, "In their collaborations, Meilhac wrote the prose dialogue, while Halévy provided the verse".

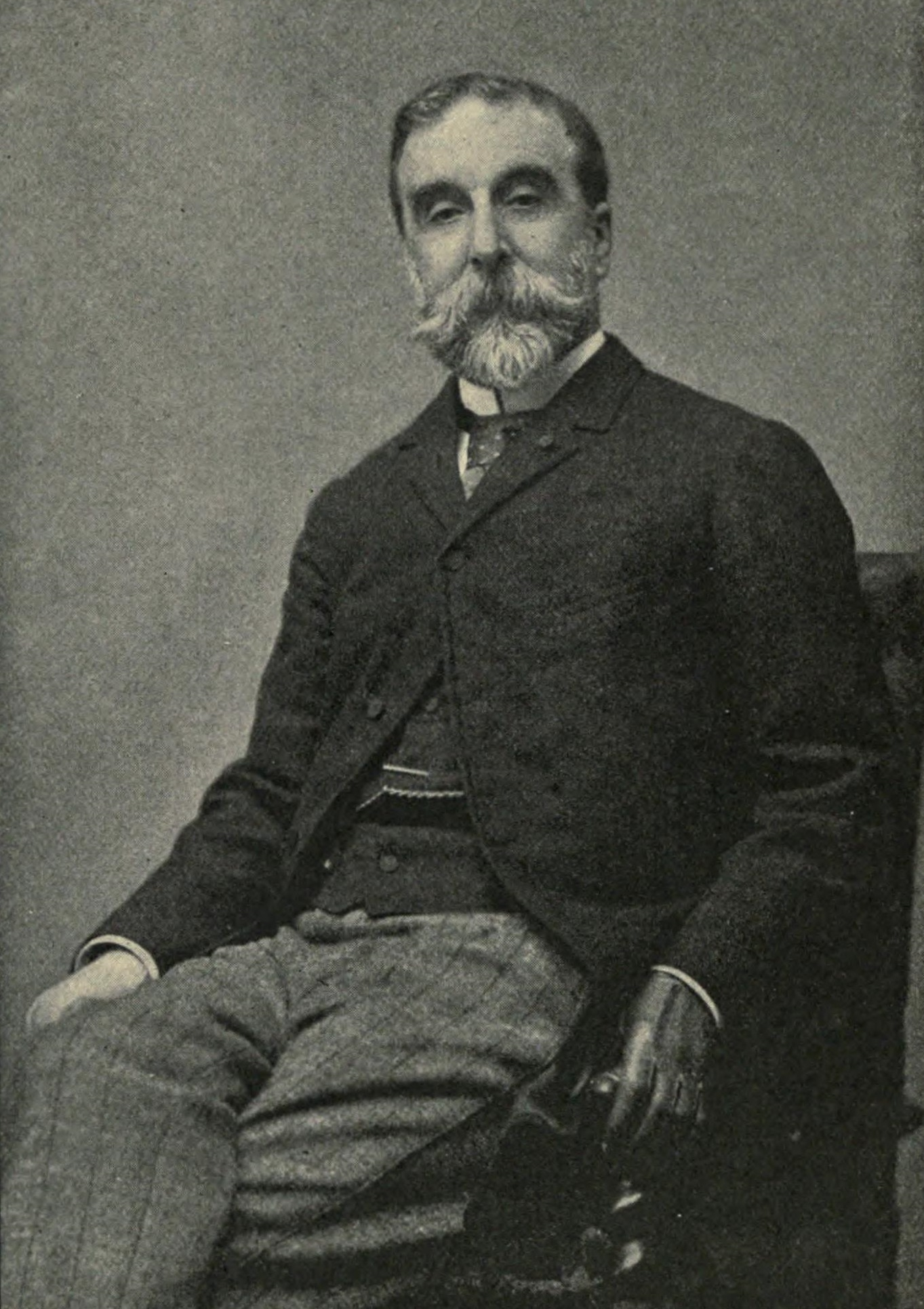
Halévy later in his career.

Grove's Dictionary of Music and Musicians says of Halévy and Meilhac:

Their achievement lay to a considerable extent in exploiting to the full the existing forms of opéra comique with its combination of music and speech, its transparently artificial plot and its topicality, which often found expression in irreverent parody. ... Situations are contrived for concerted numbers, especially at the ends of acts, and solos and ensembles are both energetic and varied. The versification of the lyrics is deft, rhyme and vocabulary are amusing, and sentiments are expressed clearly. The spoken dialogues are crisp and laconic, sometimes colloquial and never pompous except in jest. with these means Halévy and Meilhac mocked everything they observed around them in a Second Empire society that took itself too seriously.

The 1860s saw an unbroken series of eight opéras bouffes by Halévy, Meilhac and Offenbach. They started with a notable success, La belle Hélène, which opened on 17 December 1864. Despite some hostile criticism from Théophile Gautier ("To try to ridicule the heroes of Homer is almost to blaspheme") and Jules Janin ("perfidious Meilhac, treacherous Halévy, miserable Offenbach") the piece ran through most of 1865. The three followed this hit with two more: La vie parisienne (1866) and La Grande-Duchesse de Gérolstein (1867). Le château à Toto (1868) did less well, but La Périchole (1868) was another success. It was based on Le carrosse du Saint-Sacrement, a comedy by Prosper Mérimée, who was to feature again in Halévy and Meilhac's work four years later. Their last two collaborations with Offenbach in the 1860s – La diva (1869) and Les brigands (1869) – were less successful. The Franco-Prussian War of 1870–71 and the downfall of the Second Empire caused a strong reaction against Offenbach from the public, who identified him with the fallen regime. He left the country for a time, taking refuge in London and Vienna.

=== Carmen and later ===
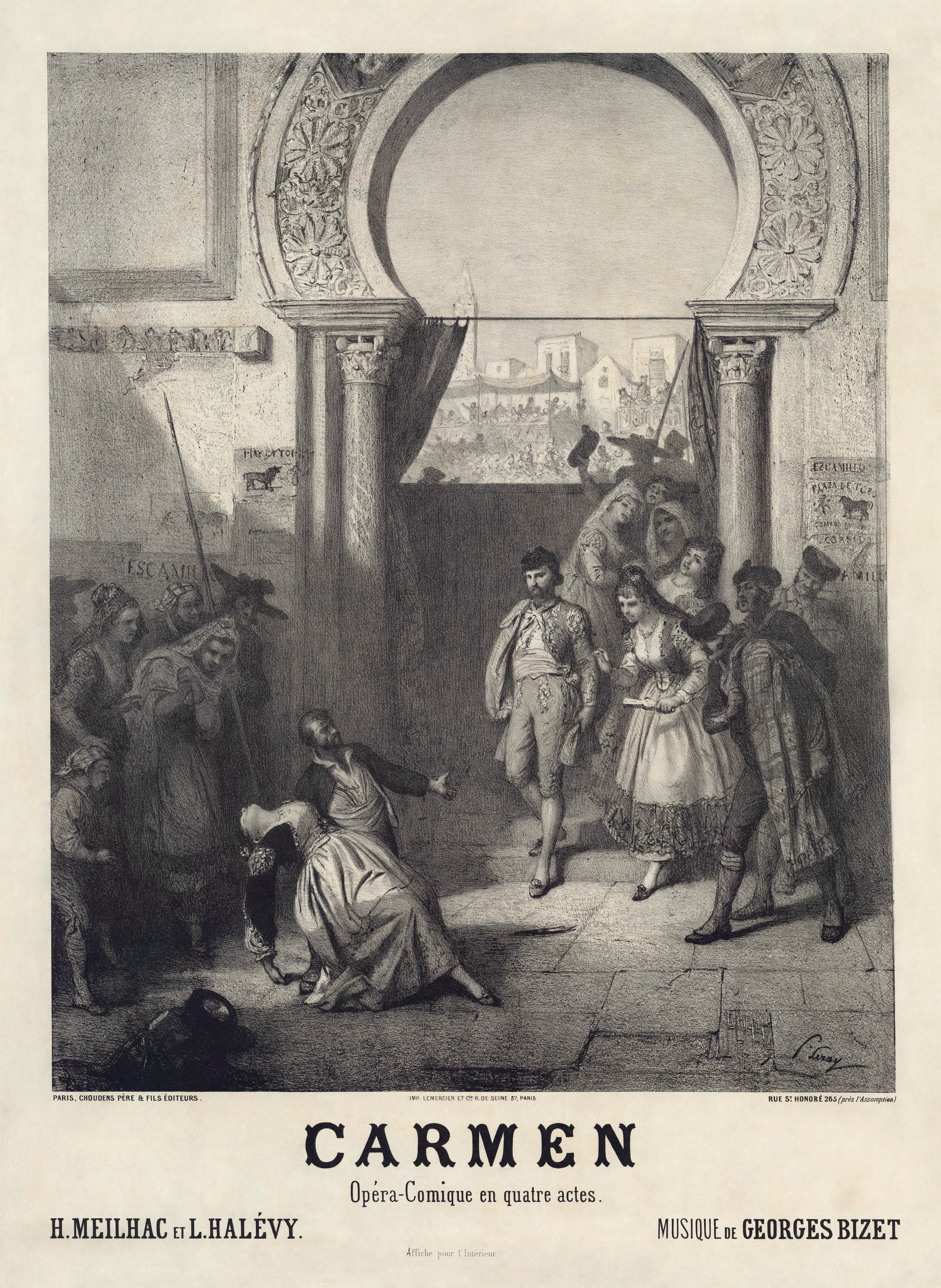
Poster for the première of Carmen

Although the two librettists were known for their comedies, in 1872 they undertook what was, for them, an unusual assignment. Halévy's cousin Geneviève (daughter of Fromental) was married to Bizet, whom the directors of the Opéra-Comique invited to write an opera in collaboration with Halévy and Meilhac. The librettists were enthusiastic about the composer's preference for a plot based on Prosper Mérimée's story Carmen; they provided a libretto with the requisite tragic ending. Nonetheless, they regarded the piece as a side venture. Just before the premiere, Halévy wrote:

There are some very, very lovely and charming things in the score, and I dare hope for a happy evening for Bizet. His interests alone matter in this instance. The thing has little importance for Meilhac and me.

The management of the Opera Comique was uneasy about presenting a tragedy, and Meilhac unsuccessfully urged Bizet to resist killing Carmen off at the end of the last act. Their predictions of a failure proved accurate: the piece completed its scheduled run of forty-eight performances, but played to small audiences.

This was the pair's only venture into tragedy. They wrote seven more libretti together, of which three were for Offenbach and four for Lecocq. Grove comments on their efforts for Carmen: "perhaps the most famous product of the Halévy-Meilhac collaboration, but not a very typical one ... There is some justice in the complaint that the remarkable style of Mérimée's original narrative is lost".

When Offenbach returned to Paris from his voluntary exile he collaborated with Halévy, without Meilhac, on an opérette, Pomme d'api, and with both librettists on revised versions of La vie parisienne and La Perichole; the three collaborators' final work together was an opéra bouffe, La boulangère a des écus.(1875). Thereafter Halévy and Meilhac provided libretti for four opéras comiques with music by Lecocq: Le petit duc (1878), La petite mademoiselle (1879), Janot (1881) and La rousotte (1881), in the last of which there was also music by Herve and Marius Boullard. They were unwitting contributors to Johann Strauss's 1874 Die Fledermaus, which plagiarised the plot of their 1872 comedy Le Réveillon (New Year's Eve). They refused to allow the operetta to be produced in France. (Note: Strauss's music was heard in Paris in 1877 with a completely new libretto by Alfred Delacour and Victor Wilder, retitled La Tzigane (The Gypsy), although, as Les Annales du théâtre et de la musique commented, the piece had "absolutely nothing gypsy, either in its melodies or in its costumes". It was not until 1904 that the version based on the original Meilhac and Halévy comedy was seen in Paris.)

Halévy retired in 1882. Meilhac kept writing until shortly before his death in 1897. Halévy died in Paris on 8 May 1908.

== Other works ==
In addition to his theatrical works, Halévy published novels, short stories and satirical studies. He and Meilhac worked together on numerous non-musical comedies, from Ce qui plait aux hommes ("What Men Like", 1860) to la Petite Mère ("The Little Mother", 1880).

== Honours ==
Halévy was elected as a member of the Académie française in 1881; he was appointed vice-president of the Society of Authors in 1882, and became an Officer of the Legion of Honour in 1890.

== Stage works ==
Title	Genre	Acts	Co-authors	Composer	Theatre	Date
Entrez, Messieurs, Mesdames	prologue		Joseph Méry	Jacques Offenbach	Théâtre des Bouffes-Parisiens	5 Jul 1855
Une pleine eau	opérette bouffe	1		Jules Costé and Comte d’Osmond	Bouffes	28 Aug 1855
Polichinelle dans le monde	ballet	1	William Busnach	Offenbach	Bouffes	19 Sep 1855
Madame Papillon	bouffe musicale	1		Offenbach	Bouffes	3 Oct 1855
Ba-ta-clan	chinoiserie musicale	1		Offenbach	Bouffes	29 Dec 1855
L'impresario	comic opera	1	Leon Battu	adapted from Mozart	Bouffes	20 May 1856
Le docteur Miracle	opérette	1	Battu (after Sheridan)	(i) Charles Lecocq (ii) Georges Bizet	Bouffes	(i) 8 Apr 1857 (ii) 9 Apr 1857
L'opéra aux fenêtres	opérette	1		Leon Gastinel	Bouffes	5 May 1857
Rose-Rosette	drama-vaudeville	3			Théâtre des Folies-Dramatiques	8 May 1858
Un fait Paris	comedy-vaudeville	1	Léon Halévy		Théâtre des Variétés	23 July 1859
Orphée aux enfers	opéra bouffon	2	Hector Crémieux	Offenbach	Bouffes	21 Oct 1858
Voici le jour	opéra bouffe	1		Jules Ward	Grand Théâtre de Lyon	1859
Le carnaval des revues	revue	3	Philippe Gille	Offenbach	Bouffes	10 Feb 1860
Titus and Bérénice	opérette	1		Gastinel	Bouffes	12 May 1860
Ce qui plait aux hommes (What Men Like)	comedy	1	Henri Meilhac		Variétés	6 Oct 1860
Un mari sans le savoir (A Husband Without Knowing It)	opéra-comique	1	Léon Halévy	M Saint-Rémy	Bouffes	31 Dec 1860
La chanson de Fortunio	opéra-comique	1	Crémieux	Offenbach	Bouffes	5 Jan 1861
Les deux buveurs (The Two Drinkers)	opéra-comique	1	Crémieux	Léo Delibes	Bouffes	5 Jan 1861
Les eaux d'Ems	opéra-comique	1	Crémieux	Delibes	Bouffes	9 Apr 1861
Le menuet de Danaé	comedy	1	Meilhac		Variétés	20 Apr 1861
Le pont des soupirs (The Bridge of Sighs)	opéra bouffon	2	Crémieux	Offenbach	Bouffes	23 May 1861
M. Choufleuri restera chez lui le . . . (M. Choufleury Will Remain at Home on ...)	opéra-comique	1	Crémieux	Saint-Rémy	Bouffes	14 Sep 1861
La baronne de San Francisco	opéra-comique	2	Crémieux	Henri Caspers	Bouffes	27 Nov 1861
Le roman comique	opérette	4	Crémieux	Offenbach	Bouffes	10 Dec 1861:
Une fin de bail (End Of Lease)	opéra-comique	1	Crémieux	Alphonse Varney	Bouffes	29 Jan 1862
Les moulins à vent	vaudeville	3	Meilhac		Variétés	22 Feb 1862
Jacqueline	opérette	1	Crémieux	Offenbach	Bouffes	14 Oct 1862
La clé de Métella (Metella's Key)	comedy	1	Meilhac		Théâtre du Vaudeville	24 Nov 1862
Les brebis de Panurge (Panurge's Sheep)	comedy	1	Meilhac		Vaudeville	24 Nov 1862
Le brésilien	vaudeville	1	Meilhac		Théâtre du Palais-Royal	9 May 1863
Le train de minuit (The Midnight Train)	comedy	2	Meilhac		Théâtre du Gymnase	15 juin 1863
Néméa	ballet	5	Meilhac and Arthur Saint-Léon	Ludwig Minkus	Salle Le Peletier	14 Jul 1864
La belle Hélène	opéra bouffe	3	Meilhac	Offenbach	Variétés	17 Dec 1864
Le photographe	comedy-vaudeville	1	Meilhac		Palais-Royal	24 Dec 1864
Le singe de Nicolet (Nicolet's Monkey)	comedy	1	Meilhac		Variétés	29 Jan 1865
Les méprises de Lambinet (Lambinet at Cross-Purposes)	vaudeville	1	Meilhac		Variétés	3 Dec 1865
Barbe-bleue (Bluebeard)	opéra bouffe	3	Meilhac	Offenbach	Variétés	Feb 1866
La vie Parisienne	opéra bouffe	5	Meilhac	Offenbach	Palais-Royal	31 Oct 1866
La Grande-Duchesse de Gérolstein	opéra bouffe	3	Meilhac	Offenbach	Variétés	12 Apr 1867
Tout pour les Daines	vaudeville	1	Meilhac		Variétés	8 Sep 1867
Le château à Toto	opéra bouffe	3	Meilhac	Offenbach	Palais-Royal	6 May 1868
Fanny Lear	comedy	5	Meilhac		Gymnase	15 Aug 1868
La Périchole	opéra bouffe	2	Meilhac	Offenbach	Variétés	6 Oct 1868
Le bouquet	comedy	1	Meilhac		Palais-Royal	23 Oct 1868
La diva	opéra bouffe	3	Meilhac	Offenbach	Bouffes	22 Mar 1869
L'homme à la clé (The Man with the Key)	vaudeville	1			Variétés	11 Aug 1869
Froufrou	comedy	5	Meilhac		Gymnase	30 Oct 1869
Les brigands	opéra bouffe	3	Meilhac	Offenbach	Variétés	10 Dec 1869
Tricoche and Cacolet	vaudeville	5	Meilhac		Palais-Royal	6 Dec 1871
Madame attend Monsieur (Madame Is Waiting For Monsieur)	comedy	1	Meilhac		Variétés	8 Feb 1872
Le réveillon (New Year's Eve)	comedy	3	Meilhac		Palais-Royal	10 Sep 1872
Les sonnettes (The Doorbells)	comedy	1	Meilhac		Variétés	15 Nov 1872
Le roi candaule	vaudeville	1	Meilhac		Palais-Royal	9 Apr 1873
L'été de la St-Martin (Indian Summer)	comedy	1	Meilhac		Comédie-Française	1 Jul 1873
Toto chez Tata	comedy	1	Meilhac		Variétés	25 Aug 1873
Pomme d'api	opérette	1	Busnach	Offenbach	Théâtre de la Renaissance	4 Sep 1873
L'opéra aux italiens (Opera For Italians)	à-propos	1	Meilhac and Busnach		Variétés	12 Feb 1874
La petite marquise	comedy	3	Meilhac		Variétés	13 Feb 1874
La mi-carême (Mid-Lent)	vaudeville	1	Meilhac		Palais-Royal	2 Apr 1871
L'ingénue	comedy	1	Meilhac		Variétés	24 Sep 1874
Mme l'archiduc	opéra bouffe	3	Millaud	Offenbach	Bouffes	31 Oct 1874
La veuve	comedy	5	Meilhac		Gymnase	5 Nov 1874
La boule	comedy	4	Meilhac		Palais-Royal	24 Nov 1873
Carmen	opéra-comique	4	Meilhac (after Mérimée)	Bizet	Opéra-Comique	5 Mar 1875
Le passage de Vénus (The Transit of Venus)	comedy	1	Meilhac		Variétés	4 May 1875
La boulangère a des écus (The Baker has Money)	opéra bouffe	5	Meilhac	Offenbach	Variétés	19 Oct 1875
La créole	opéra comique	3	Meilhac and Albert Millaud	Offenbach	Bouffes	3 Nov 1875
Loulou	comedy	1	Meilhac		Palais-Royal	31 Mar 1876
Le prince	comedy	4	Meilhac		Palais-Royal	25 Nov 1876
La cigale (The Cricket)	comedy	5	Meilhac		Variétés	6 Oct 1877
Le fandango	ballet	1	Meilhac and Louis Mérante	Gaston Salvayre	Opéra	26 Nov 1877
Le je ne sais quoi	vaudeville	1	Meilhac		Renaissance	21 Jan 1878
Le petit duc	opéra-comique	5	Meilhac	Lecocq	Renaissance	25 Jan 1878
Le mari de la débutante (The Debutante's Husband)	comedy	4	Meilhac		Palais-Royal	5 Feb 1879
Le petit hôtel	comedy	1	Meilhac		Comédie-Française	21 Feb 1879
La petite mademoiselle	opéra-comique	3	Meilhac	Lecocq	Renaissance	12 Apr 1879
Lolotte	comedy	1	Meilhac		Vaudeville	4 Oct 1879
La petite mère	comedy	3	Meilhac		Variétés	6 Mar 1880
Janot	opéra comique	3	Meilhac	Lecocq	Renaissance	22 Jan 1881
La roussotte (The Redhead)	vaudeville-opérette	3	Meilhac and Millaud	Lecocq, Hervé and Marius Boullard	Variétés	26 Jan 81

Source: Nos auteurs et compositeurs dramatiques.

== Notes, references and sources ==
=== Sources ===
- Esteban, Manuel (1983). Georges Feydeau. Boston: Twain. ISBN 978-0-8057-6551-9.
- Faris, Alexander (1980). Jacques Offenbach. London: Faber & Faber. ISBN 978-0-571-11147-3.
- Gammond, Peter (1980). Offenbach. London: Omnibus Press. ISBN 978-0-7119-0257-2.
- Gänzl, Kurt (2001). The Encyclopedia of the Musical Theatre (second ed.). New York: Schirmer. ISBN 978-0-02-864970-2.
- Hansen, Eric (1987). Ludovic Halévy: A Study of Frivolity and Fatalism in Nineteenth-century France. Lanham: University Press of America. ISBN 978-0-81-915887-1.
- McClary, Susan (2002). Georges Bizet: Carmen. Cambridge: Cambridge University Press. ISBN 978-0-52-139301-0.
- Martin, Jules (1897). Nos auteurs et compositeurs dramatiques (in French). Paris: Flammarion. OCLC 9145330.
- Noël, Édouard; Edmond Stoullig (1878). Les Annales du Théâtre et de la Musique, 1877 (in French). Paris: Charpentier. OCLC 1051558946.
- Yon, Jean-Claude (2000). Jacques Offenbach (in French). Paris: Gallimard. ISBN 978-2-07-074775-7.
