= Virginie Déjazet =

French actress (1798–1875)

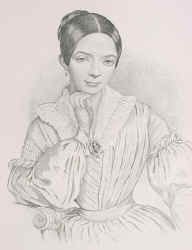
- Virginie Déjazet by Ludwig Richter
- Born: 30 August 1798; Paris, France
- Died: 1 December 1875 (aged 77)
- Occupation: actress

Pauline Virginie Déjazet (French: [viʁʒini deʒazɛ]; 30 August 1798 – 1 December 1875) was a French actress, famous soubrette, and a well-known travesti performer.

== Life ==
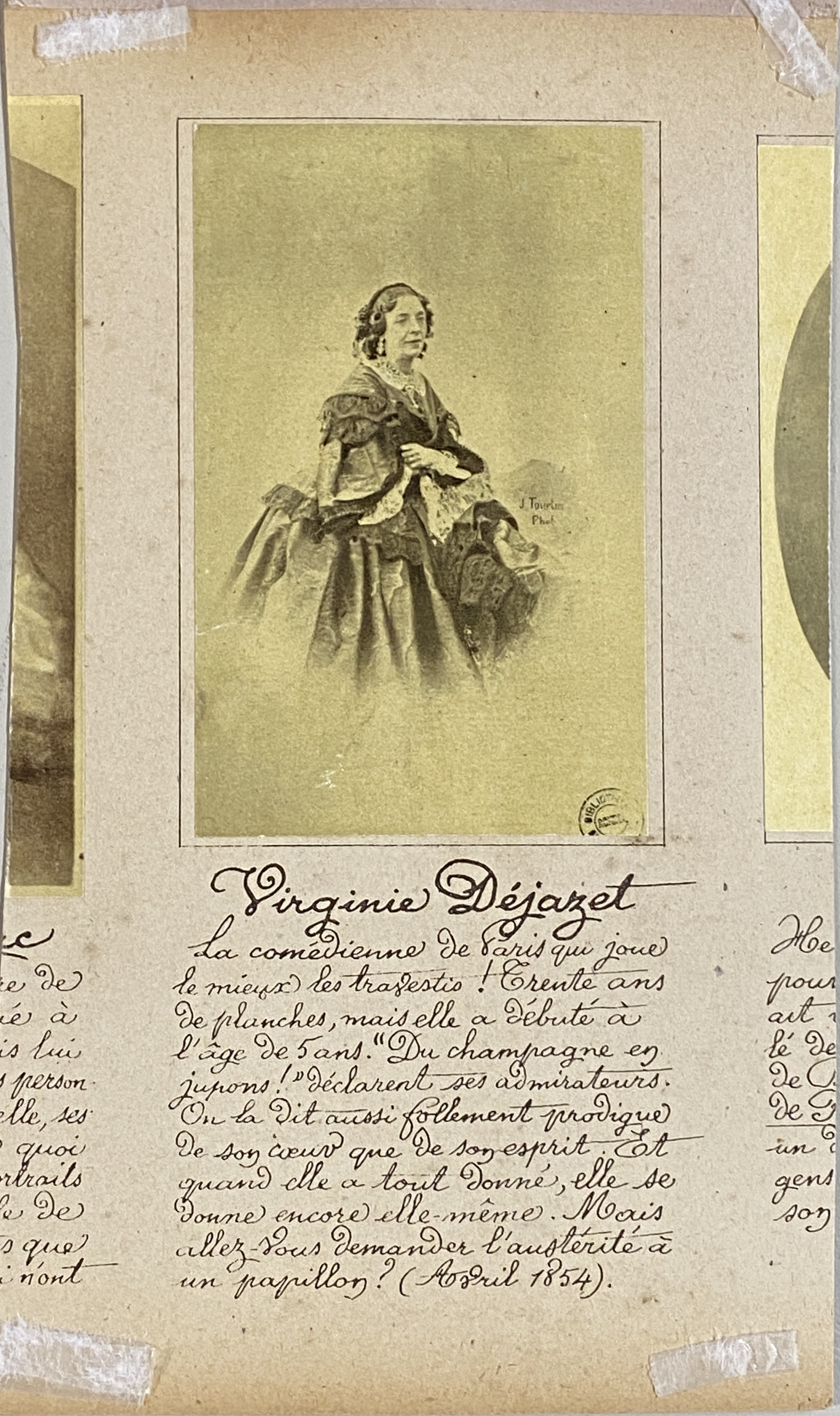
Photo and biography

Déjazet was born in Paris in 1798, and made her first appearance on the stage at the age of five. It was not until 1820, when she began her seven years' connexion with the recently founded Gymnase, that she won her triumphs in soubrette and "Breeches roles", which came to be known as "Dejazets."

From 1828 she played at the Théatre des Nouveautés for three years, then at the Théâtre des Variétés, and finally she became manager, with her son, of the Folies-Déjazet, later renamed the Théâtre Déjazet. Here, at the age of sixty-five she still had success in youthful parts, especially in a number of Sardou's earlier plays, previously unacted. She retired in 1868, but then took a touring company to London's Opera Comique in October 1870.

She died in 1875 in Belleville, Paris and she was buried in division 81 of Père Lachaise Cemetery. Her funeral witnessed an extraordinary outpouring of devotions from her fans and the theatrical community.

== Travesti performance ==
Over a period of three decades, starting from the 1820s, Virginie Déjazet was a big draw at the box office as a comic actress and singer. She was a famous soubrette of the popular theatre, specialized in travesti (cross-roles) performance. She created over hundred such roles on the semi-musical stage of vaudeville. She was judged peerless in playing travesti. She was being considered as one of the most famous travesty performers of the early nineteenth century. She even played Napoleon with a huge army.
