= Opéra bouffe =

French opera genre

Opéra bouffe (French pronunciation: [ɔpeʁa buf], plural: opéras bouffes), literally "jesting opera", is a genre of mid to late 19th-century French operetta. It is closely associated with Jacques Offenbach, who produced many operas of this genre at the Théâtre des Bouffes-Parisiens, inspiring the genre's name.

It differs from the opéra comique of the same period in being more humorous and farcical, often with satirical elements. The most famous examples are La belle Hélène, Barbe-bleue (Bluebeard), La Vie parisienne, La Périchole and La Grande-Duchesse de Gérolstein.
