= Boule-de-Neige =

1871 opéra-bouffe by Jacques Offenbach

Jacques Offenbach by Nadar, c. 1860s

Boule-de-Neige is an opéra bouffe in three acts premiered in 1871 with music composed by Jacques Offenbach to a French libretto by Charles Nuitter and Étienne Tréfeu, adapted from that by Eugène Scribe and Henry Boisseaux for Offenbach's earlier Barkouf (1860). The opera's title refers to a bear that becomes a ruler.

== Background ==
After the upheaval of the Franco-Prussian War and personal attacks on him, Offenbach attempted to re-launch his career with Le roi Carotte in collaboration with Victorien Sardou; at the same time he got Nuitter and Tréfeu to write a new libretto with which he could re-use music from Barkouf., which had sunk without trace at the Opéra-Comique in 1860 after seven performances. In a letter to the press, Nuitter pointed out that he and Tréfeu originally had an idea for an opera subject after reading the August 1871 edition of the Revue britannique which had an article on the cult of animals in Scandinavia. When Offenbach pointed out that this legend had formed the basis of Barkouf, they approached the widows of Scribe and Boisseaux who agreed to an adaptation of the Barkouf libretto. Offenbach had already worked with Nuitter and Tréfeu, on single-act works Il signor Fagotto (1863), L'amour chanteur, Le fifre enchanté and Jeanne qui pleure et Jean qui rit (all 1864), Coscoletto, ou Le lazzarone (1865) and the full-length Princesse de Trébizonde just before the war. The original title was to be Balabrelock, the name of the prime minister. Offenbach was busy at this time: Le roi Carotte was premiered at the Théâtre de la Gaîté a month later, and three days after that Fantasio was first seen at the Opéra-Comique.

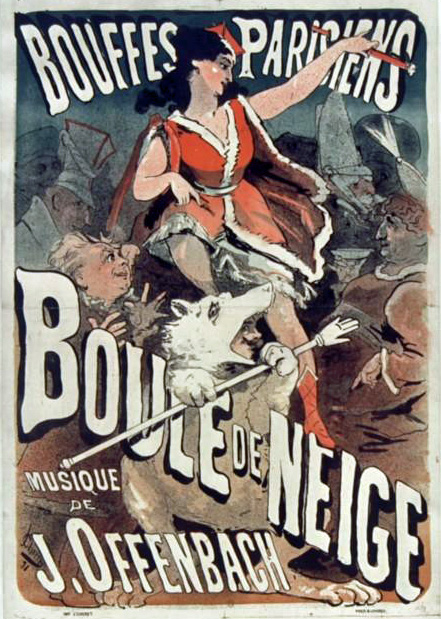
Poster by Jules Chéret for Boule-de-Neige at the Bouffes Parisiens, 1871

Keck asserts that musically Boule-de-Neige inhabits a different genre to Barkouf. Boule-de-Neige has attractive numbers but is generally accessible for the audience of the Bouffes, melodic and familiar in tone as opposed to the daring harmonies in Barkouf, often surprising from the composer. He concludes that when working for the Salle Favart, Offenbach had taken greater care with the music. Jean-Claude Yon notes that the libretto has merit and is very amusing. The confrontation between Boule-de-Neige and three ministers in act 3 uses the musical theme "Prenez garde! la Dame blanche regarde!" from Boieldieu's La dame blanche. The device of having a man disguised as the bear while reducing the bite of the plot (from the dog in Barkouf) made the piece more acceptable to the public.

== Performance history ==
The opera featured well-established Offenbach performers, such as Berthelier, Désiré, Montrouge and Thierret and the press reception was mixed. Offenbach went to Vienna and Pest to supervise productions.

The Dezède database records performances by an amateur group in November 2014 at the Théâtre Saint-Léon, Paris.

Two excerpts, including the Act III finale, were recorded in 2006 using an edition prepared by Jean-Christophe Keck as part of an Offenbach anthology. Jodie Devos included three extracts in a CD Offenbach recital in 2019; from Act I the Couplets de la dompteuse "Je suis du pays vermeil", Olga's Act I romance "Souvenance" and "Allons, couchez" from Act III.

== Roles ==
Roles, voice types, premiere cast
Role	Voice type	Premiere cast, 14 December 1871 Conductor: Jacques Offenbach
Olga, animal trainer	soprano	Marie Peschard
Balabrelock, Prime minister	baritone	Désiré
La Grande Khane	mezzo-soprano	Félicia Thierret
Le Grand Khan	baritone	Montrouge
Grégorine, daughter of Balabrelock	soprano	Bonelli
Schamyl, fur merchant	mezzo-soprano	Nordet
Le caporal, commander of the armed forces	tenor	Berthelier
Kassnoiseff, chamberlain	bass	Édouard Georges
Kachmir, glazier		Duplessis
Polkakoff, dancing master		Victor
Potapotenski, the governor's head chef ('officier de bouche')		Montbars
Patchouline, Solicitor General		De Ribeaucourt
Krapack, pharmacist		Guyot
Praskovia, flower-seller		Guérin
Advotiva, cake-maker		Ramelli
Nadeje, fruit-seller		Cinty
Kamitchine, orange-seller		Rose Marie
Three dames d’honneur		De Ribeaucourt, Ramelli, Rutha
Four soldiers		Darcourt, Vidal, Bony, Judile

== Synopsis ==
The hero of the opera is a white bear called “Boule-de-Neige” (snow-ball), and the work takes place in a seemingly ungovernable kingdom in Asiatic Russia.

The first act is set in a market-place where the glazier Kachmir and fur merchant Schamyl meet and discuss their loves, respectively the bear-trainer Olga and Grégorine, daughter of the senior minister Balabrelock. After another revolution in which Kachmir is nominated ruler, the Grand Khan arrives and has him arrested by the Caporal. To punish the recalcitrant city, the Khan makes the bear – who makes his entrance in a golden cage – ruler in the hope that fear of being ruled by such a ferocious creature will calm the will of a population too keen on revolutions.

The second act, now in a palace, has the courtiers and solicitors protected from Boule-de-Neige. When the Khan makes a surprise visit with Olga behind, she recognizes the bear as one which was stolen from her, and succeeds in calming it. The bear signs with his paw – by intermediary of his trainer Olga – increasingly grotesque decrees. It is however Olga's lover, Kachmir, in a bear-skin to evade the police, acting for the animal. Balabrelock and senior officials discover the ruse and vow to replace Boule-de-Neige.

The third act is in the palace gardens. Olga and Schamyl stop a conspiracy to get rid of the bear. At the moment that Olga manages to expose the plot, the bear escapes and causes mayhem in the palace. The Khan, aware of the deceits and plots, rules that Olga and Kachmir should reign together and all ends well.
