= Whittington (opera) =

1874 opera by Jacques Offenbach

Jacques Offenbach by Nadar, c. 1860s

Whittington is an opera (described in the premiere programme as 'A New Grand Opera Bouffe Feerie, in Four Acts and Nine Tableaux) with music by Jacques Offenbach, based on the legend of Dick Whittington and His Cat. It was premiered in a spectacular production at the Alhambra Theatre, London, on 26 December 1874. Whittington is the only major work of Offenbach to have received its premiere in London, and came between the incidental music for La Haine and his third version of Geneviève de Brabant.

== Background ==
The work was commissioned by Wood & Co, publishers for the Christmas season at the Alhambra, Leicester Square. Based on a scenario by H. B. Farnie, a French libretto was prepared by Charles-Louis-Étienne Nuitter and Étienne Tréfeu (who had previously given Offenbach Il signor Fagotto, Le Fifre enchanté, Coscoletto, La princesse de Trébizonde and Boule de neige), and then translated into English by Farnie for the production in London's West End.

Offenbach devised three major dance sequences in deference to the Alhambra's reputation as a theatre of ballet: for sailors in Act 1, a 'Grand Barbaric Ballet' in Act 2 and a ballet for peasants and archers in the fourth act. The 1890s French critic in Les Annales was particularly impressed by several numbers of the score, noting particularly the quartet "Tout bon citoyen d'Angleterre", the cat's song, the duetto "Mais qu'est ce donc qu'une chatte ?" and the Act 1 quartet of the inventory. Jean-Claude Yon cites the ballad "Wind that blows across the sea", Hirvoia's brindisi, the police sergeant's comic song and the first act finale with its 'romance du miaou' and waltz song, as evidence of Offenbach keeping to his high musical standards.

Offenbach's La chatte métamorphosée en femme also has a prominent role for a feline.

== Performance history ==
In anticipation of the new piece, the Alhambra revived Offenbach's Le roi Carotte; at its premiere Whittington was preceded by Dieu et la Bayadère by Auber and a one-act farce. Whittington then ran for 120 performances in the large theatre of the Alhambra.

The notice given in the Illustrated Sporting and Dramatic News for the 1874–1875 production criticized both text and music, and faulting it for tampering with the well-known story and transposing the whole cast on the ship to meet the fate of being shipwrecked. More favourable reviews were given elsewhere, for instance in The Athenaeum.

Since 1885 the director of the Théâtre du Châtelet in Paris had wished to mount Whittington in the French capital. Finally on 19 October 1893 the work was seen at the theatre as Le Chat du diable. For this, Nuitter and Tréfeu reworked their original libretto, and a few movements from the ballet Le Papillon were inserted in the score. It ran for 77 performances that year (with another 11 in early 1894) but then fell into neglect.

In more recent times the 2000 City of London Festival included a concert performance of the work at the Mansion House, using materials reconstructed from an autograph score dating from Offenbach's lifetime, possibly for a putative French staging. The cast included Sally Bruce-Payne in the title rôle, Constance Hauman, Nerys Jones, Christian Immler and Kevin West; the conductor was Cem Mansur and narrator John Suchet.

In 2005 University College Opera staged the work at the Bloomsbury Theatre London.

The song 'The Haunted Kickaboo' in Act 1 was published separately after the London premiere and found its way into Victorian song anthologies. No 17 in Act 2, "Voici le moment où l'on dîne" is included in the CD Offenbach anthology 'Offenbach au menu'.

== Roles ==
Roles, voice types, premiere cast
Role	Voice type	Premiere cast, 26 December 1874	Revised Paris premiere, 19 October 1893 Conductor: Alexandre Artus
Dick Whittington	soprano (tenor in French)	Kate Santley	Alexandre
Fitzwarren, alderman and draper	baritone	Charles Heywood	Scipion
Alice, daughter of Fitzwarren	soprano	Julia Matthews	Mlle Marette
Thomas, Dick's cat	mute	Abrahams	F Prévost
Dorothy, Fitzwarren's cook	soprano	Lennox Grey	Blanche Miroir
Police sergeant		Harry Paulton	
Captain Bobstay		J Rouse	Thiry
Princess Hirvaia	mezzo-soprano	Grace Armytage	Juliette Darcourt
Moonshi		W Worboys	
King Edward III		Hutton	
King Lallali			Gardel
Zazi			Mlle Dumont
Chorus, Dancers

== Synopsis ==
Dick Whittington is an apprentice to the draper Fitzwarren whose daughter Alice he is in love with. After an argument with his master, Whittington flees the shop in company of his cat Thomas. Alice and the cook Dorothy track him down in Highgate where he is sleeping on the street with his cat as a pillow. Dick goes on the run again pursued across rooftops by a strange police patrol. He embarks on the sailing ship Z. 10 owned by Fitzwarren under the captain Bobstay. In the second act the ship has set in on the exotic island of Bambouli with temples and sacred gardens where Whittington and others witness a grand procession of the local ruler. Employed at the court Dick gains swift promotion thanks to the attentions of Princess Hirvaia, although he remains faithful to Alice. Whittington becomes rich by ridding the island of all its rats with the help of his cat. The third act, after a pastoral interlude, is back in London, where the cat guides Dick to Alice's house. Now a rich man, Whittington can marry Alice. Edward III of England receives him at Westminster Hall and names him Lord Mayor of London. The opera ends with a grand Lord mayoral procession.

== Musical numbers ==
The vocal score published in London by J. B. Cramer & Co., 201, Regent Street, contains both the English words of Farmie and the French words of Nuitter and Tréfeu.

In square brackets are additional words on the inner pages.

Act	No.	Description in the score		First line in English	First line in French
I		Instrumental[e] introduction			
	1	Chœur des acheteurs	Shop chorus	Come shop, there shop no more be trying	Répondez donc à la pratique
	2	From sand glass and sundia [(The bell ringer)]	Song & chorus	From sand glass and sun dial folks the hour take, ah!	De mainte horloge on fait l'éloge
	3	A prentice linen-draper	Rondo	A prentice linen-draper	Nous étions dans la rue
	4	Good English beer	Finale, scene 1 [scene 1, act 1]	So long as there's good beer in England	Tout bon citoyen d'Angleterre
	4bis	Marche de la patrouille	[Scene 2, Highgate]		
	5	O slumber and dream	[Ballad]	O slumber and dream for dark the way across the lonely moor	Sur toi dans sa rage si d'abord s'acharne un mauvais sort
	6	Look him up	Finale, scene 2 [Scene 2, act 1]	Look him up	Il est pris
	6bis	Hornpipe scene, the ship	[Scene 3]		
	7	The haunted kickabo	Song & chorus	Ah! Well I remember Tom Bellows	J'ai là dans un coin de la cale
	8	Sweetheart, here I am	Finale, scene 3 [Scene 3, act 1]	Sweetheart, here I am	Alice ! pstt, pstt, pstt
II		Entr'acte, instrumental			
	1	Here in dreamly leisur	Hammock chorus	Here in dreamly leisure	Pendant qu'en cadence
	2	Woman's wil[l] [(Ça m'est égal)]	Couplets avec chœur	A Princess I but still a woman	Que l'eau soit froide, chaude ou tiède
	3	The ship was old [(Prenez pitié)]	Quintett[e]	The ship was old	Prenez pitié
	4	O tell me pray [(Mais qu'est ce donc qu'une chatte)]	Duett	O tell me pray what's a cat?	Mais qu'est ce donc qu'une chatte ?
	5	Great at colonizing [Fils de l'Angleterre]	Rondo & chorus	Great at colonizing	Fils de l'Angleterre
	5bis	D° D° [Exit of court]		Great at colonizing	Fils de l'Angleterre
	6	Cortege instrumental [Cortège]			
	7	Ballet music			
	8	D° D°			
	9	Corps de ballet			
	10, 11, 12	Variations on D° [Var:]			
	13	Galop finale			
	14	O wind that blows [across the sea]	Ballad	I wander where fair flow's are fairest	Dans ce beau pays de l'Asie
	15	We are very wise [(Nous possédons tous)]	Chorus of moonshi's	We are very wise	Nous possédons tous
	16	Song of the hird & the maiden	[The] Rat song	The song of the bird and the maiden	L'oiseau chante sous la ramée
	17	The banquet's prepared	Finale & [(A)] chorus [(B) Dinner rondo]	The banquet's prepared bannish sorrow	Voici le moment où l'on dîne
	18 [17B]	English meats are brought	Dinner rondo & chorus	English meats are brought together	Ce pâté de Bécassines
III	19	While yet the earth is sleeping	[Chœur et ballet]	While yet the earth is sleeping	Allons jeunes filles
	20	Valse			
	21	Thimblerig song [(Paddok était un petit homme)]	Chanson	My gentleman so quick and nimble	Paddock était un petit homme, Sir
	22	Little we've found out [(Avez vous trouvé quelque trace ?]	[Trio]	Ah! little we've found out for master!	Avez-vous trouvé quelque trace ?
	23	Again, again [C'est toi !]	Duet[t]	Again, again	C'est toi ! C'est toi !
	24	Finale [At last I hope (Je suis le père)]		At last I hope	Je suis le père
	25	[Finale The] Lord Major's show	March & chorus [Marche]	To our Lord Major's glory	Gloire au nouveau Lord Maire !
