= Vert-Vert =

Opéra comique by Jacques Offenbach

Jacques Offenbach by Nadar, c. 1860s

Vert-Vert is an opéra comique in three acts by Jacques Offenbach, with a libretto by Henri Meilhac and Charles Nuitter, first performed on 10 March 1869 at the Paris Opéra-Comique. Based on the 1734 poem « Vert-Vert ou les voyages du perroquet de la visitation de Nevers » by Jean-Baptiste Gresset, the opera found little success and has only been occasionally revived, although a complete studio recording was released in 2010.

== Background ==
The Art-Lyrique website offers two other French operatic works with the same name: an opéra-comique in one act by Nicolas Dalayrac with libretto by Desfontaines created at the Opéra-Comique (Salle Favart) on 11 October 1790, and Vert-Vert ou le Perroquet de Nevers, also an opéra-comique in one act, by Gauthier, with words by Bernard-Valville, first seen at the Théâtre des Jeunes-Artistes on 2 December 1800. In 1832 a comédie-vaudeville was mounted by Virginie Déjazet at the Théâtre du Palais-Royal with some success and it was this which then led to the opéra-comique of 1869; while the libretto is credited to Meilhac and Nuitter, Halévy, Leuven and Pittaud de Forges also had a hand in it, the latter two having created the vaudeville over 30 years before.

Although contemporary critics were not complimentary, a more recent one commended the “delightful music, including a Key Duet as catchy as the Watch Duet in Fledermaus, the exquisite Barcarolle in which Vert-Vert describes his first erotic awakenings, a brilliant number for a tenor who has lost his voice (most comically orchestrated), a scrumptious love duet, and a Figaro-style sextet in a garden at night”.

All these lyric works were inspired by the Gresset poem of 1734 – A pious parrot kept by the Visitandines Sisters of Nevers, Vert-Vert speaks like a good Christian. Sought by the curious nuns from Nantes, he was sent there with a Loire boatman and en route naturally acquires some of the sea-faring vocabulary. On arrival in Nantes the bird swears like a sailor and the nuns, horrified, send the parrot back to Nevers where it is almost impossible to make it relearn Latin. Nonetheless, the bird ends his days embraced in solicitude to the extent of expiring of indigestion.

The librettists cite one passage in its entirety in the first scene:

Mais de nos sœurs, ô largesse indiscrete ! Du sein des maux d'une longue diette, passant trop-tôt dans des flots de douceurs, bourré de sucre, et brûlé de liqueurs, Ver-Vert, tombant sur un tas de dragées, en noirs cyprès vit ses roses changées. En vain, les sœurs tâchoient de retenir son ame errante et son dernier soupir; Vert-Vert ou les voyages du perroquet de la visitation de Nevers, chant quatrième	Mais de nos sœurs ! ô largesse indiscrète, Du sein des maux d’une longue diète, Passant trop tôt dans des flots de douceurs, Bourré de sucre et brûlé de liqueurs, Vert-Vert, tombant sur un lit de dragées, En noirs cyprès vit ses roses changées. En vain vos soins tâchaient de retenir Son âme errante et son dernier soupir. Vert-Vert, acte I, scène première

The subject was also used in 1851 for a ballet-pantomime in three acts with music by Édouard Deldevez and Jean-Baptiste Tolbecque and choreography by Joseph Mazilier, performed at the Théâtre de l'Opéra-Le Peletier, with de Leuven contributing to the scenario.

== Performance history ==
1869 was a prolific year for Offenbach; after Vert-Vert, Paris saw the premieres of La Diva, La princesse de Trébizonde, Les Brigands and La Romance de la rose before December was out. Offenbach's third creation for the Opéra-Comique was more successful than his first two – Barkouf (1860) was only seen seven times and never revived, Robinson Crusoé (1867) reached 32 performances before closing, while Vert-Vert ran for 58 nights. Capoul was highly praised for his singing (his first act romance was encored), although his female admirers were disappointed that he had shaved off his mustaches for the production. A German production conducted by the composer had some success at the Carltheater, Vienna in February 1870, entitled Kakadu, adapted by Julius Hopp. A Paris revival on 16 May 1870, with Girard in the title role lasted only three nights.

Although an 1874 production which bastardized the score was mounted in London, causing a scandal owing to scanty costumes for the dancers, the first full United Kingdom production of the opera as Offenbach, Meilhac, and Nuitter had intended was at Garsington in 2014. This was conducted by David Parry, with a translation by him; Robert Murray took the title role, and the cast also included Yvonne Howard, Mark Wilde and Fflur Wyn.

Jean-Christophe Keck has made a performing critical text of Vert-Vert; the world premiere was in June 2002 in the Marmorsaal, Bad Ems with soloists, chorus and Ensemble Orchestral de Mosan conducted by Jean-Pierre Haeck. Keck's edition was also used for the studio recording and Garsington production.

The overture has been recorded over the years by the Wiener Symphoniker conducted by Bruno Weil, the Cincinnati Pops Orchestra, Erich Kunzel, the Berlin Philharmonic Orchestra, Herbert Von Karajan and Orchestre de la Suisse Romande, Neeme Järvi.

== Roles ==
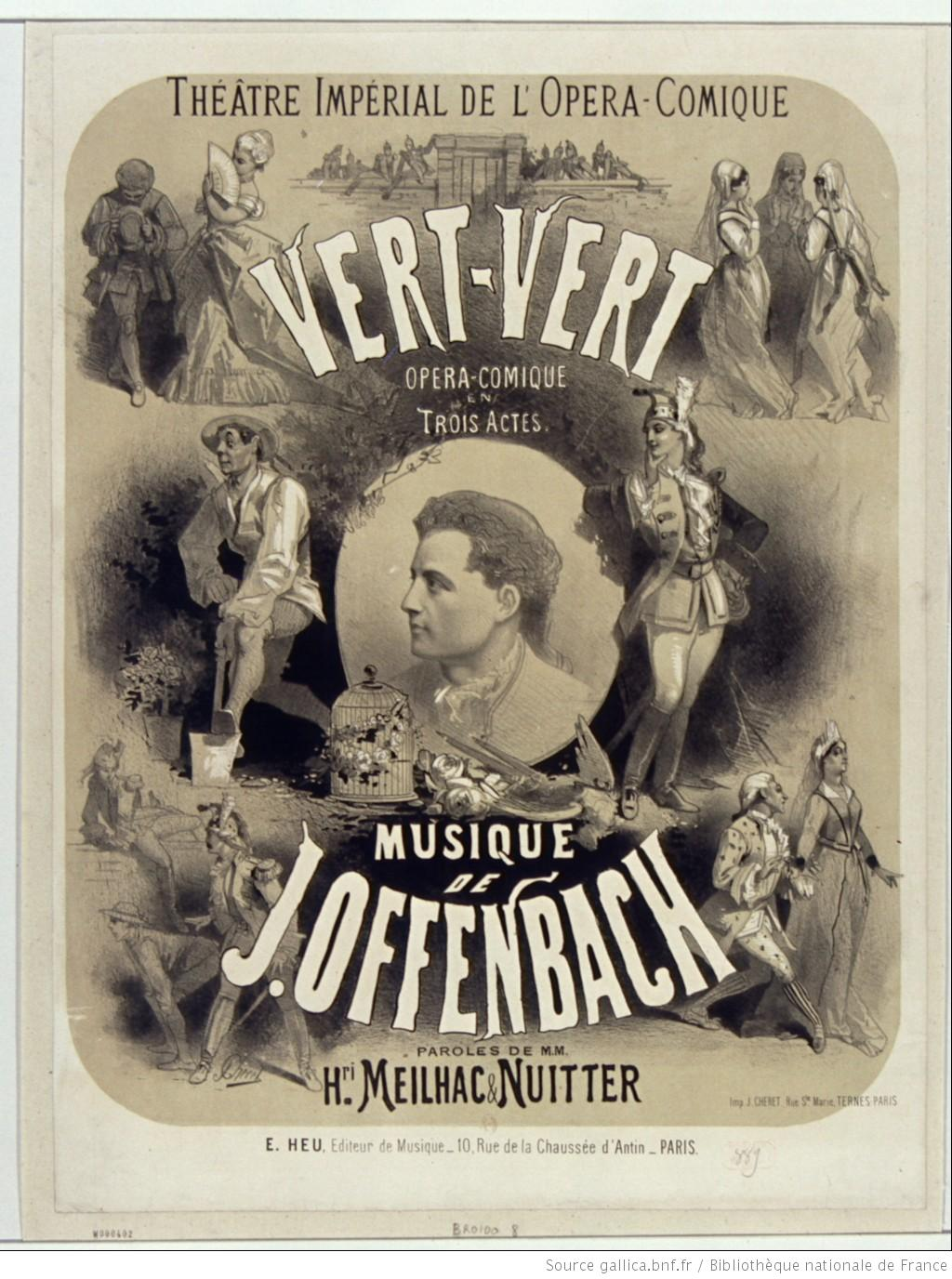
Poster by Jules Chéret for the first production of Vert-Vert at the Opéra-Comique

Role	Voice type	Premiere cast, 10 March 1869 (Conductor: )
Mimi, pensionnaire	soprano	Marie Cico
Mademoiselle Paturelle, sous-directrice	mezzo-soprano	Révilly
Bathilde, pensionnaire	soprano	Gabrielle Moisset
Emma, pensionnaire	soprano	Tual
La Corilla, singer	dugazon (mezzo-soprano)	Caroline Girard
Mariette, servant at the Lion d'Or	soprano	Coralie
Valentin	tenor	Victor Capoul
Baladon, dancing-master	baritone	Charles Couderc
Binet, gardener	trial	Sainte-Foy
Le Chevalier de Bergerac, dragoon officer	tenor	Potel
Le Comte d'Arlange, dragoon officer	baritone	Gaillard
Friquet, dragoon	tenor	Leroy
Maniquet, theatre directeur	bass	Bernard
Bellecour, singer	tenor	Ponchard
Chorus: Pensionnaires, Dragoons, Actors and Actresses

== Synopsis ==
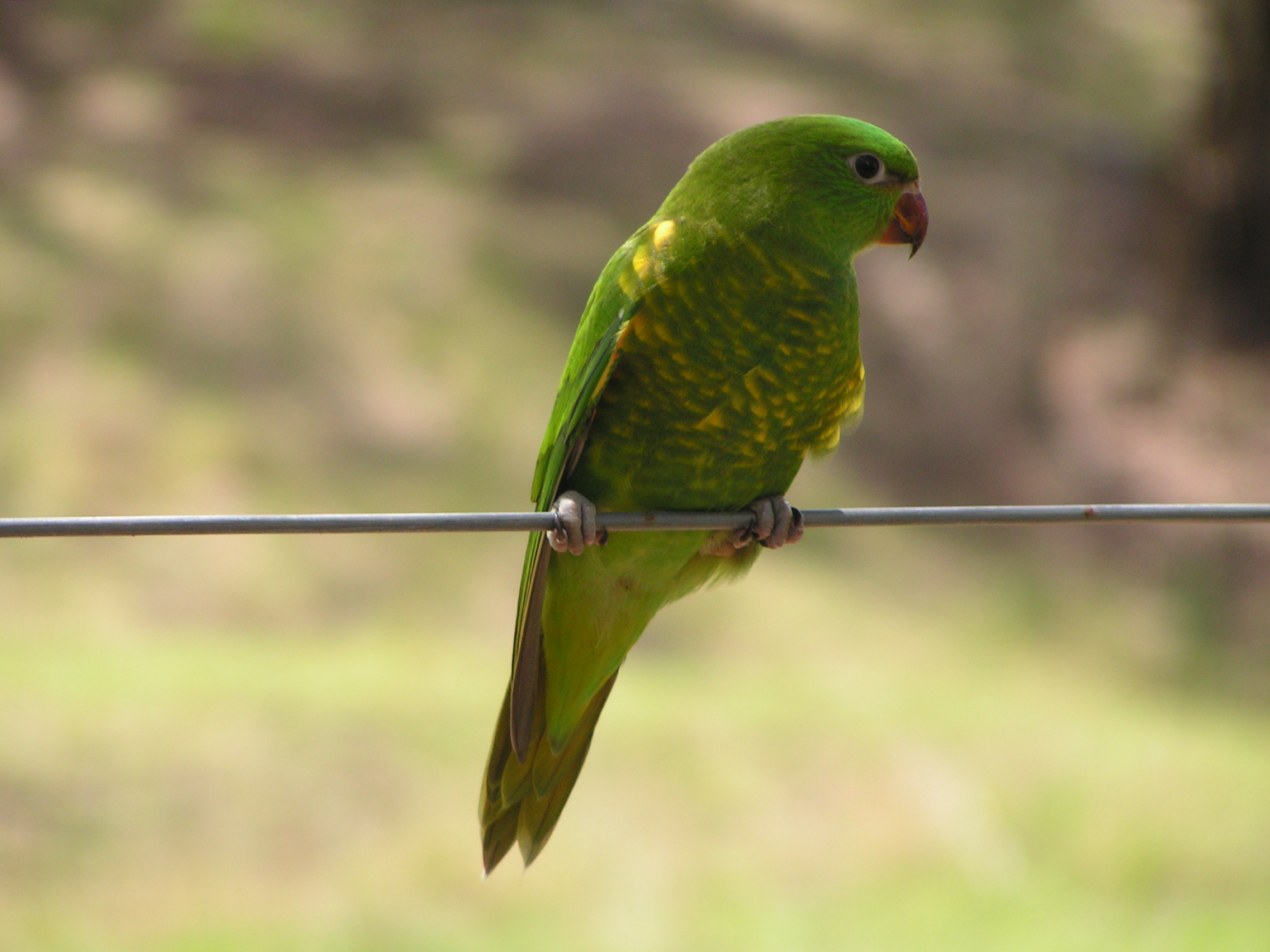
Juvenile scaly-breasted lorikeet

=== Act 1 ===
The gardener of the Convent of Saint-Rémy, Binet is digging a grave as the girls of the pensionat enter in funeral cortege mourning the death of Vert-Vert, their much-loved pet parrot. A young man, Valentin, nephew of the director and brought up in the convent, gives an oration for the burial, despite the fact that he could not abide the bird. The girls, including Mimi, and two sisters Emma and Bathilde, resolve to get a successor for their parrot, to make a fuss of, and agree that Valentin, secretly in love with Mimi, will be perfect. Valentin is swayed and takes the same nickname, Vert-Vert. Binet calls out their unfaithfulness.

Two dragoons climb over the wall of the convent and stop Binet from alerting the schoolmistresses of their presence. The soldiers are the Comte d’Arlange and his younger friend Friquet; the former is married to Bathilde and commands Binet to fetch her, reminding Friquet that he and another officer, Bergerac, married to Emma, were obliged to leave their wives straight after their weddings. Bathilde enters and Friquet is despatched, while Binet insists on staying on to observe the lovers. The convent bell rings and the Comte promises to release the girls from the pensionat, then jumps back over the wall.

Mademoiselle Paturelle, the schoolmistress, enters the garden and, annoyed that Binet is there, orders him to go inside. The dancing-master Baladon arrives and it is soon apparent that he and Paturelle are a couple, wed in secret, as otherwise Paturelle would lose her position. Baladon, thwarted by the absence of intimacy with his wife, is given a key to the gate and they agree to meet again that night. They are interrupted by Mimi, Emma and Bathilde, amused to see the older people together.

Bathilde tells Emma of the rescue plan, but Mimi is unhappy because her own darling Vert-Vert, lives at the convent. Mimi’s musings are disturbed by Binet who tells her that Vert-Vert must go to visit his sick aunt; Vert-Vert will travel on the barge with Binet as his 'mentor'. The convent inmates assemble to wave off Vert-Vert, whom Binet vows to protect, while Vert-Vert promises to be well-behaved. Mimi is determined to follow them, and when Friquet arrives as replacement gardener, Binet, she takes his uniform. As the two travelers depart, she follows them to keep an eye on Vert-Vert as he ventures into the outside world.

=== Act 2 ===
In Nevers, the dragoons, led by Le Comte and Bergerac, are in light-hearted humour. La Corilla, the famous singer is arriving at the Lion d’Or for a performance the following day. The Comte and Bergerac flirt unashamedly with her and she offers a free performance in return. Just as they are left alone, Le Comte, Bergerac and the singer are interrupted by the theatre manager to start a rehearsal. The tenor, Bellecour, enters, late and suffering from a cold: he was in an argument with a fool on the barge who had praised his master’s voice, and the grand tenor was tossed into the river during the dispute. The director is furious, but just then Binet (the servant) and Vert-Vert (his master) enter, and Vert-Vert is persuaded reluctantly to sing. The company is delighted but the director, having estimated his losses demands that they be paid or he will take Binet to court. Binet boldly goes off to find the judge, with Bellecour, the officers and the director as witnesses.

Vert-Vert is alone with La Corilla who begins to flirt with him, persuading him to sing in the performance with her instead of Bellecour. At first rebuffing her, he confesses that on the barge he was obsessed by an enigmatic beauty who looked like La Corilla. Now seduced by La Corilla, the returning Comte and Bergerac witness the singer taking Vert-Vert off to rehearse.

Just then a mysterious young dragoon enters – Mimi disguised in Friquet’s uniform, and still on the tail of Vert-Vert. Le Comte devises a plan – Mimi will help them inveigle themselves into the convent and rescue their wives and they will help her to win Vert-Vert. Le Comte now instructs Binet to summon the actors and actresses to join the dragoons at the inn. They arrive, Vert-Vert on La Corilla’s arm, and glowing with success; he is soon drunk and the party ends in rowdy fashion.

=== Act 3 ===
At the convent, the girls grimly undertake a dancing class – sadly without male partners. Baladon offers a demonstration of the history of the dance. Mademoiselle Paturelle rushes in, concerned that Mimi has been taken to the infirmary, although the girls know she is not actually in the convent. Then Mimi comes in, asserting that she was in the garden hearing all the gossip from the village. Binet and Vert-Vert appear, in much stress, stating that they were held by robbers. In the confusion, Mimi tells Emma and Bathilde of their husbands' plot to abduct them later from the garden. When he lets slips an oath, Vert-Vert confesses that in fact he has learnt to drink, curse and flirt, demonstrating this to the horrified Mademoiselle Paturelle and the thrilled girls. Left alone, Vert-Vert and Mimi squabble but he tells her that he has now learned above love; and now knows that he only loves her, Mimi; they fall into each other’s arms.

Night falls and Friquet, in his gardener's clothes, is in the garden and trips over the Comte and Bergerac but they realize who he is and send him to meet their friends waiting to help them. Bathilde and Emma come to meet their husbands and the two couples conceal themselves as Mimi and Vert-Vert slip into the garden. But then Baladon and Mademoiselle Paturelle also arrive in for their tryst. Not seeing each other in the dark, they are misled by whispering from all sides. Amid the chaos of voices and bodies the doorbell rings loudly and the convent girls rush in followed by Binet who insists that Bathilde and Emma be given to their husbands, and that Mimi and Vert-Vert should be allowed to wed. Vert-Vert submits that Mademoiselle Paturelle might take her proper place as Madame Baladon. At first adamant, she relents when the dragoons appear over the wall. Admitting her defeat Paturelle agrees that the couples be united and, if they find a suitable husband among the dragoons, all the remaining girls can do so as well.

== Discography ==
Complete recording with dialogue : Thora Einarsdottir (Mimi), Ann Taylor (Emma), Lucy Crowe (Bathilde), Toby Spence (Valentin), Mark Le Brocq (Binet), Mark Stone (Le Comte d'Arlange), Anne-Marie Owens (Mademoiselle Paturelle), Franck Leguérinel (Baladon), Loïc Félix (Chevalier de Bergerac), Jennifer Larmore (La Corilla), Sébastien Droy (Bellecour), Franck Lopez (Maniquet), Geoffrey Mitchell Choir, Philharmonia Orchestra, David Parry – Opera Rara, 2010
