= Félicia Thierret =

French actress

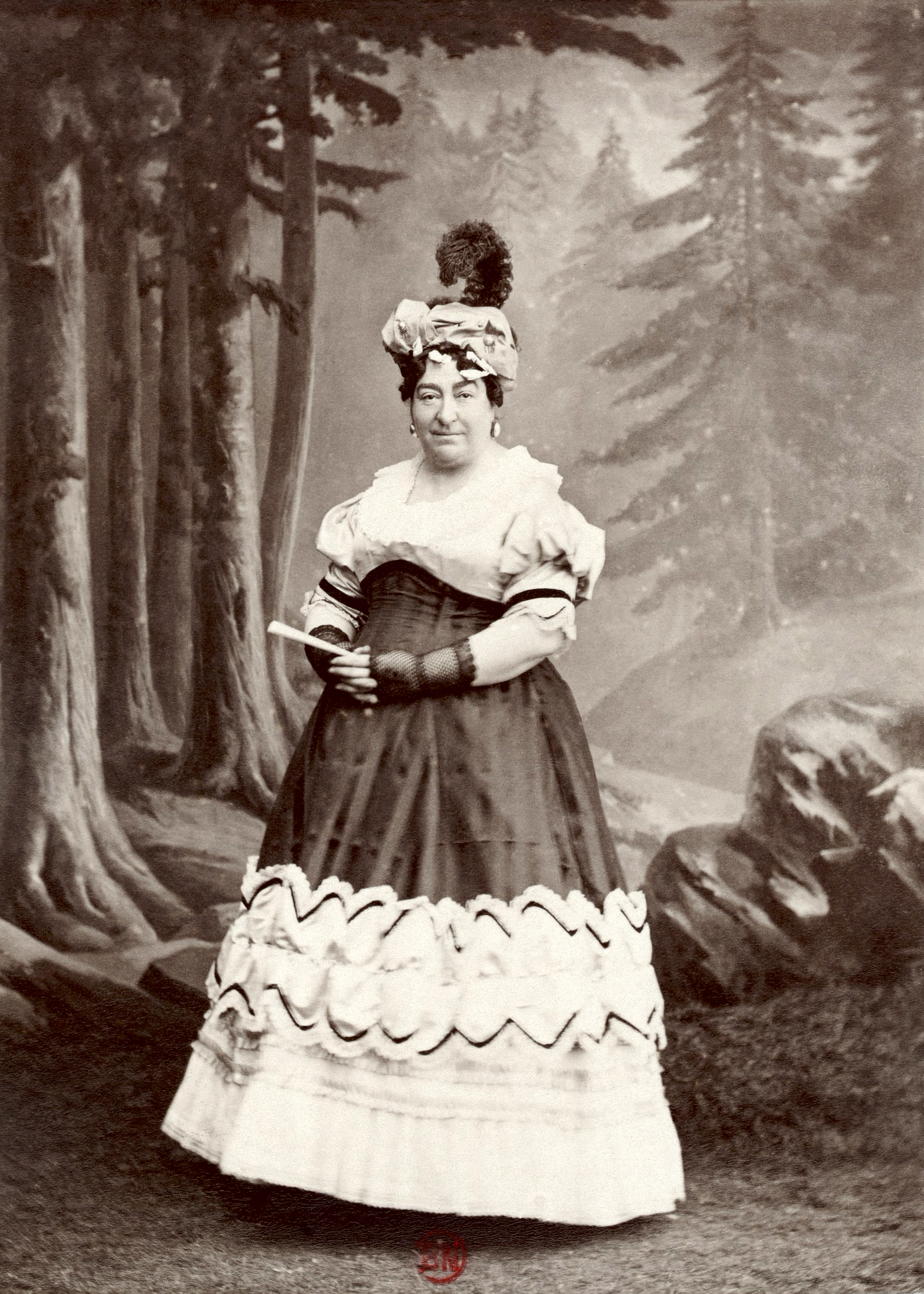
Photographic portrait by Nadar

Félicie Marie, called Félicia Thierret, around 1814 – 1 May 1873 was a French comedian.

== Life ==
Born in Paris, after attending the Conservatoire national supérieur d'art dramatique, Thierret made her debut at the Comédie-Française as Suzanne in Le Mariage de Figaro by Beaumarchais. She was accepted as a boarder in 1832 but soon left the theatre to alternate between Parisian stages and tours in the provinces. The list of her engagements in Paris is impressive : Comédie-Française (in 1832 and 1841), Théâtre de l'Odéon (in 1839 and 1857), Théâtre du Palais-Royal (in 1848 and 1858), Théâtre des Bouffes-Parisiens (in 1867) and Théâtre des Menus-Plaisirs (in 1873).

She could have pursued the classical repertoire, but this probably did not suit her whimsical temperament. When she played Tartuffe at the Odéon in particular (as Dorine). As she grew older, she became overweight, which prompted her to turn – successfully – to the role of the old women. In 1858, she returned to the Théâtre du Palais-Royal, where her comic side could be expressed in comedies, vaudevilles and operettas. Charles Legrand described her as follows: "Massive, hommasse, a semi-busted nose, small mischievous eyes, a half-rare smile, the troupier step, the hâbleur gesture", quoted by Henry Lyonnet.

Eugène Hugot says of her:

Nothing more comical or more completely cheerful was ever seen on the part of the weaker sex. She had a way of articulating that belonged to her alone, and she emphasized words so humorously that she centuplicated their value.

In 1873, while performing La Mariée de la rue Saint-Denis at the Théâtre des Menus-Plaisirs, she felt ill and went to bed, never to get up again and died of pneumonia contracted during the performances. The press widely praised an actress full of originality, verve and comic strength.

She was married to Jean-Baptiste Georgin. "In the town, Mme Thierret was cited for the exceptional regularity of her morals and the exemplary devotion she showed to her elderly mother. »

== Roles ==
- 6 September 1850 – La Fille bien gardée by Eugène Labiche and Marc-Michel, Théâtre du Palais-Royal : La baronne de Flasquemont
- 9 April 1851 – Mam'zelle fait ses dents by Labiche and Marc-Michel, Théâtre du Palais-Royal : Mme Chatchignon
- 16 October 1852 – Edgar et sa bonne by Labiche and Marc-Michel, Théâtre du Palais-Royal : Mme Beaudeloche
- 17 December 1852 – Mon Isménie by Labiche and Marc-Michel, Théâtre du Palais-Royal : Galathée
- 2 March 1853 – Les folies dramatiques by Dumanoir and Clairville, Théâtre des Variétés : Tromboline
- 1855 – Le Bonheur de vivre aux champs, one act vaudeville by Henry Monnier, Théâtre du Palais-Royal :
- 26 March 1857 – L'Affaire de la rue de Lourcine by Labiche, Albert Monnier and Édouard Martin, Théâtre du Palais-Royal : Norine
- October 1857 – Tartuffe by Molière, Théâtre de l’Odéon : Dorine
- 24 December 1858 – En avant les Chinois ! by Labiche, Théâtre du Palais-Royal : Fleur-de-thé
- 2 February 1861 – La Mariée du mardi gras by Lambert-Thiboust and Eugène Grangé, Théâtre du Palais-Royal
- 7 March 1862 – La Station Champbaudet by Labiche and Marc-Michel, Théâtre du Palais-Royal : Mme Champbaudet
- 9 May 1863 – Le Brésilien, one-act comedy by Henri Meilhac and Ludovic Halévy, Théâtre du Palais-Royal : Mme Karadec
- 22 February 1864 – La Cagnotte, by Labiche and Alfred Delacour, Théâtre du Palais-Royal : Léonida
- 31 October 1866 – La Vie parisienne, opéra-bouffe in five acts Jacques Offenbach, libretto by Meilhac and Halévy, Théâtre du Palais-Royal : Mme de Quimper-Karadec
- 6 September 1867 – La Main leste by Labiche and Édouard Martin, Théâtre des Bouffes-Parisiens : Mme Legrainard
- September 1868 – L'île de Tulipatan, opera-bouffe in one act by Jacques Offenbach, libretto by Henri Chivot and Alfred Duru, Théâtre des Bouffes-Parisiens : Théodorine
- March 1869 – La Diva, opera-bouffe in three acts by Jacques Offenbach, libretto by Meilhac and Halévy, Théâtre des Bouffes-Parisiens : Mme Palestine
- September 1869 – Le Rajah de Mysore, musical buffoonery in one act by Charles Lecocq, libretto by Chivot and Duru, Théâtre des Bouffes-Parisiens : Fisapour
- December 1869 – La princesse de Trébizonde, opera-bouffe in three acts by Jacques Offenbach, libretto by Charles Nuitter and Étienne Tréfeu, Théâtre des Bouffes-Parisiens : Paola
- December 1871 – Boule-de-Neige, opéra-bouffe in three acts by Jacques Offenbach, libretto by Nuitter et Tréfeu, Théâtre des Bouffes-Parisiens : La Grande-Khane
- 28 December 1871 : : La dame aux jambes d'azur, by Eugène Labiche : Mme Chatchignard, fairy tale in three acts by Clairville, Eugène Grangé and Victor Koning, Théâtre des Menus-Plaisirs
- 1873 – Un clou chasse l'autre, Théâtre des Menus-Plaisirs
- April 1873 – La Mariée de la rue Saint-Denis, folie-vaudeville in three acts by Clairville, Grangé and Koning, Théâtre des Menus-Plaisirs
