= Anna Van Ghell =

Belgian singer

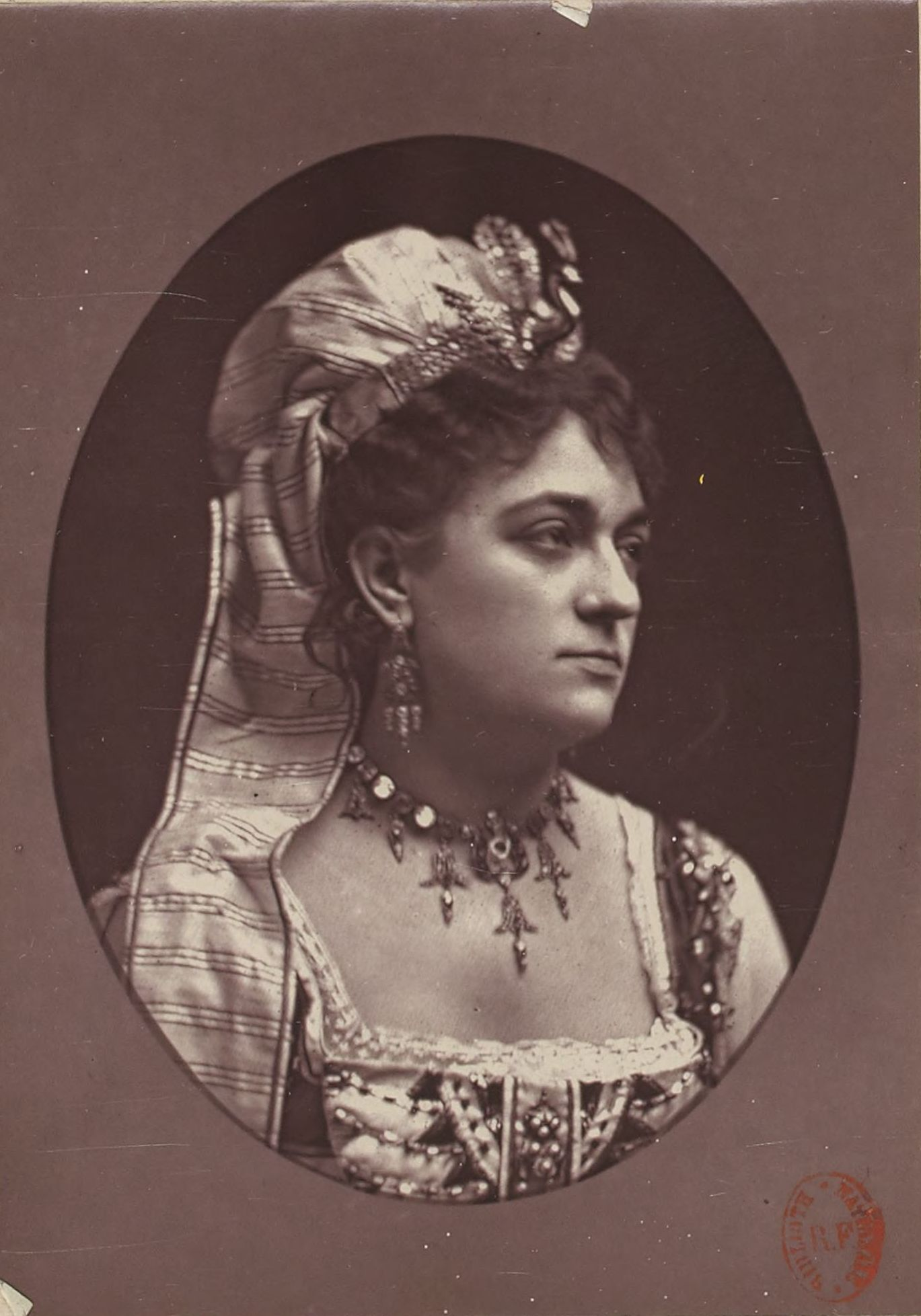
Anna Van Ghell

Anna Van Ghell was a Belgian singer who starred in numerous operettas in Paris. She was called Anna Vanghel or Vanghell in France.

== Life ==
Van Ghell was the student of her father who was a conductor.

She made her debut at the Théâtre des Bouffes-Parisiens, in the travesti role of prince Raphael in La princesse de Trébizonde, 7 December 1869, then appeared in Les Bavardes. She left the Bouffes for the Théâtre des Variétés, to play the role of Fiorella in Les Brigands. She played Jane in Le trône d'Ecosse by Hervé, performed in Les cent vierges by Charles Lecocq, and the role of Metella in Offenbach's La Vie Parisienne. She appeared at the Théâtre de l'Opéra-Comique under the name of Rose Friquet but after two or three performances her contract was terminated because the repertoire did not suit her, and she returned to the Variétés. She went to the Théâtre des Folies-Dramatiques for the revival of La Fiancée du roi de Garbes. She played the role of Clairette in La Fille de madame Angot.

== Repertoire ==
- 1868: Le Petit Poucet by François Anatole Laurent de Rillé, libretto by Eugène Leterrier and Albert Vanloo at the Théâtre de l'Athénée, 23 April 1869
- 1869: Le petit Faust by Hervé, Théâtre des Folies-Dramatiques as Méphisto
- 1869: Offenbach's La princesse de Trébizonde, 7 December 1869, Théâtre des Bouffes-Parisiens
- 1871: Les Brigands, Théâtre des Variétés as Fiorella
- 1872: Les cent vierges by Charles Lecocq, Théâtre des Variétés as Gabrielle
- 1873: Les Dragons de Villars, February 1873, at the Opéra-Comique as Rose Friquet
- 1873: La Vie parisienne, Théâtre des Variétés as Métella
- 1874: Le Parachute by Bell
- 1874: Le Petit Faust by Hervé at the Théâtre des Menus Plaisirs as Méphisto
- 1874: La Vie parisienne, Théâtre des Variétés as Métella
- 1875: La fille de Madame Angot at the Théâtre des Folies-Dramatiques as Clairette
- 1877: La Foire Saint-Laurent by Offenbach, 10 February 1877
- 1877: Rothomago, féérie, music by Adolphe De Groot, libretto by Adolphe d'Ennery, Clairville and Albert Monnier, revived 27 October 1877, at the Théâtre du Châtelet.
