= La princesse de Trébizonde =

Opéra bouffe with music by Jacques Offenbach

Jacques Offenbach by Nadar, c. 1860s

La Princesse de Trébizonde is an opéra bouffe with music by Jacques Offenbach and text by Étienne Tréfeu and Charles-Louis-Étienne Nuitter. The work was first given in two acts at the Theater Baden-Baden on 31 July 1869 and subsequently presented in a revised three-act version at the Théâtre des Bouffes-Parisiens on 7 December of the same year.

== Background ==
1869 was a productive and successful year for Offenbach. Vert-Vert, an opéra comique by him in three acts had its premiere at the Paris Opéra-Comique on 10 March. This was followed less than two weeks later by the first performances of his opéra bouffe La diva at the Bouffes-Parisiens on 22 March. On 31 July La princesse de Trébizonde was given its premiere at Baden-Baden under the direction of the composer. In December of the same year, in the space of five days, the revised three-act version of La princesse de Trébizonde had its first performance on the 7th at the Bouffes-Parisiens, followed by the world premiere of the three act opéra bouffe Les brigands on the 10th at the Théâtre des Variétés in Paris and the premiere of the one act La romance de la rose took place at the Bouffes-Parisiens the following day.

== Roles ==
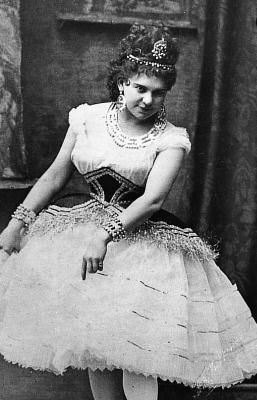
Josefine Gallmeyer as Zanetta posing as a waxwork, in the Vienna production of La princesse de Trébizonde

Role	Première cast of the three act version in Paris on 7 December 1869	Voice Type
Regina	Mlle Chaumont	Mezzo-soprano
Zanetta	Mlle Fonti	Soprano
Paola	Félicia Thierret	Contralto
Prince Raphaël	Anna Van Ghell	Mezzo-soprano
Cabriolo	Désiré	Bass
Trémolini	Bonnet	Tenor
Prince Casimir	Jean-François Berthelier	Tenor
Sparadrap	Édouard Georges	Tenor
Villagers, hunters, circus folk, girls, etc

== Synopsis ==
=== Act 1 ===
A public square

Cabriolo is the proprietor of a sideshow in a travelling funfair. The attractions in the sideshow include a group of waxworks with the highlight an exceptionally beautiful one of the princess of Trébizonde. Among the members of the travelling entertainers are also Cabriolo's sister Paola, who has an act as a "Femme Sauvage", his daughters Zanetta and Regina, and Trémolini, Regina's long suffering sweetheart. While dusting the waxwork of the princess of Trébizonde, Zanetta accidentally breaks its nose off but in order to save the show she offers to impersonate the statue herself. A young nobleman Prince Raphaël and his tutor Sparadrap come to visit the funfair and instead of paying for admission in money the Prince drops a lottery ticket into the collection box to gain entrance to the show. Prince Raphaël falls madly in love with, as he thinks, the waxwork of the princess. The troupe of entertainers are amazed and overjoyed to receive the news that the lottery ticket has won and the prize is – a castle!

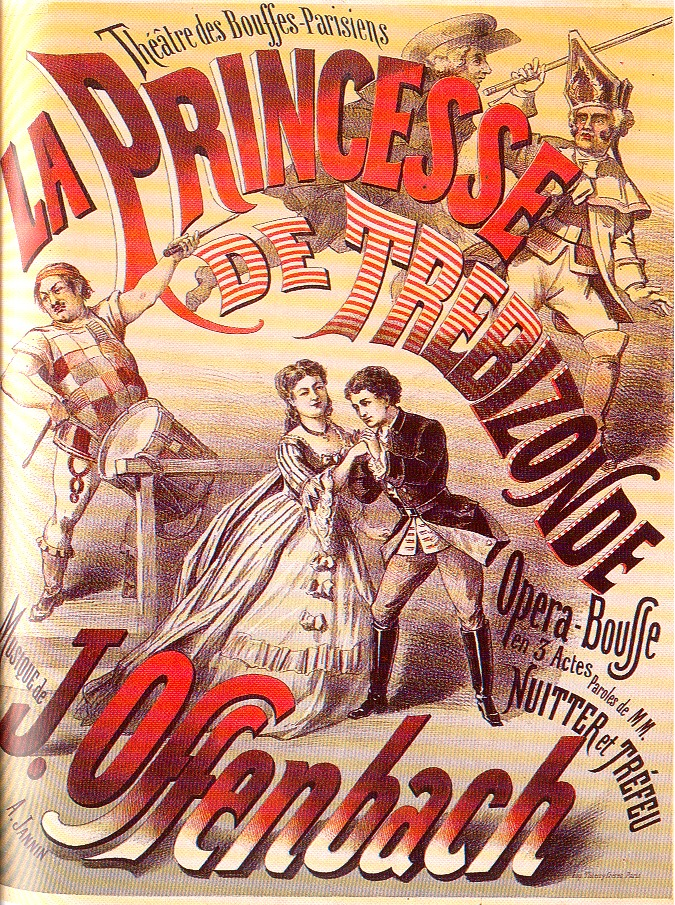
Poster for La princesse de Trébizonde, 1870 lithograph by Jannin (Bibliothèque nationale de France collections)

=== Act 2 ===
The castle

Six months have passed, and Cabriolo and his band of entertainers are not finding life in a castle nearly as glamorous as they had imagined it would be. In fact they are all terribly bored and miss their previous lives as travelling players. Out on a hunting trip, Prince Raphaël catches a glimpse of a girl who seems to be his Princess of Trébizonde. He makes a detour into the castle and Zanetta eventually admits that it was her in disguise he saw that day at the circus. Raphaël and Zanetta hatch a plan to stay together. Raphaël's father Prince Casimir and his tutor Sparadrap present themselves at the castle. Raphaël persuades his father to purchase all the waxwork figures of the old sideshow and to make Cabriolo curator of a museum containing them. They all return to Casimir's Palace.

=== Act 3 ===
Prince Casimir's palace

Cabriolo has been elevated to the title of "Baron Cascatella" and he and his family along with the waxwork show are living in Prince Casimir's palace. Trémolini and Regina have re-kindled their romance, and Sparadrap and Paola have also fallen for each other. Raphaël has kept up a pretence of being in love with a waxwork doll because while being in love with a waxwork is harmless enough, his father would never allow him to marry a girl so far below him in rank as Zanetta is. Finding out that Prince Casimir is going out on a night-time hunting expedition, Raphaël plans an extravagant supper for himself and Zanetta. Plans are made to meet later that evening in the castle museum. Coincidentally Trémolini and Regina, and Sparadrap and Paola, also make plans to meet in the same place that very night. After much confusion all three couples are discovered by Cabriolo who has come to visit his beloved waxworks and all sit down to a magnificent supper. A suspicious Prince Casimir has returned early from the hunt and after a certain amount of elaborate pretence by Cabriolo it is revealed that his son is in love with a circus performer, but when it is discovered that he himself had once been married to a lady acrobat – in fact Paola's long-lost sister – he can offer no objection to his son's choice, and the work concludes with festive preparations for a triple marriage.

== Reception and performance history ==
The work was a success with audiences and critics, and was revived at the Bouffes-Parisiens in 1871, 1875 and 1876. The larger Théâtre des Variétés presented the work in 1888 with Christian (Cabriolo), Cooper (Trémolini), Barral (Casimir), Georges (Sparadrap), Mary Albert (Prince Raphaël), Mily-Meyer (Regina), Crouzet (Zanetta) and Aubrys (Paola).

La princesse de Trébizonde was given productions in London and Brussels, among other cities, in 1870, and Offenbach was in London for the week of the 1870 production at the Gaiety; in his Gaiety Chronicles John Hollingshead noted that Offenbach "passed his evenings chiefly at the few music halls which London could boast of". The following year saw the piece produced in New York and Berlin as well as other international centres.

It was given in the 1966 Vienna Festival weeks conducted by Walter Goldschmidt, in a Wolfgang Glück production, and at the State Theatre Brunswick in 1975. The Wiener Kammeroper performed it in a production by Fritz Muliar in 1985, with Anton Duschek as the tutor Sparadrap, Michael Pinkerton as Trémolini and Sabine Rossert as the Princess.

Recent productions include performances in Baden-Baden, where the original version of the piece had its première, in 2015, in Limoges, France, in 2016, and Hildesheim Stadttheater in 2019. New Sussex Opera gave five staged performances of the opera in English in November and December 2021, conducted by Toby Purser.

== Recordings ==
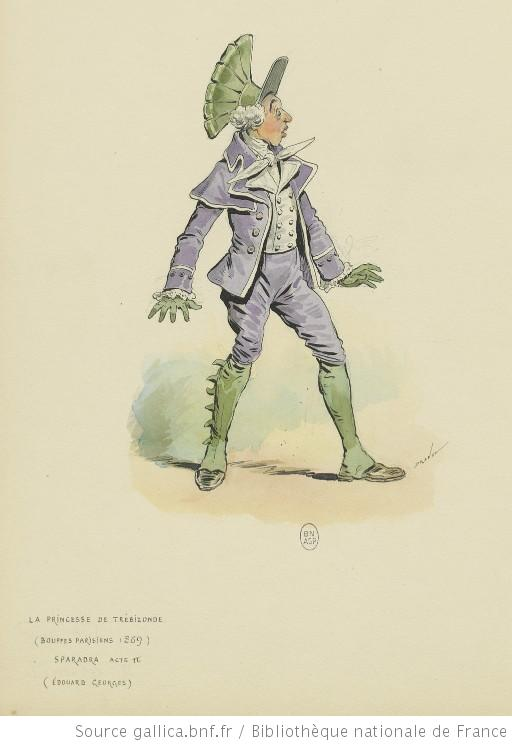
Edouard Georges as (Sparadrap), drawing by Draner

A recording in Russian from 1954 with the USSR State Radio Orchestra and Chorus of an hour of music from the opera was issued as two 10 inch LPs and one 12 inch LP by Melodiya. A complete French radio recording from 1966 conducted by Marcel Cariven with Lina Dachary as Zanetta was issued by Malibran records in 2016. The overture was included in a CD entitled 'Grüss aus Baden-Baden!' with the Baden-Badener Philharmonie conducted by Werner Stiefel (Sterling CDS 1062–2) in 2004, and on a CPO CD with the Brandenburgisches Staatsorchester Frankfurt under Howard Griffiths in 2019.

In 2023, a complete recording with Paul Daniel conducting the London Philharmonic Orchestra was released by Opera Rara. It used the Keck edition of the 1869 Paris version, but with eight numbers from the original Baden Baden production as an appendix; the cast included Anne-Catherine Gillet (Zanetta), Virginie Verrez (Prince Raphael), Antoinette Dennefeld (Regina), Katia Ledoux (Paola), Josh Lovell (Prince Casimir), Christophe Mortagne (Tremolini), Christophe Gay (Cabriolo) and Loïc Félix (Sparadrap).
