= L'île de Tulipatan =

Opéra bouffe by Jacques Offenbach

- Opéra bouffe by Jacques Offenbach
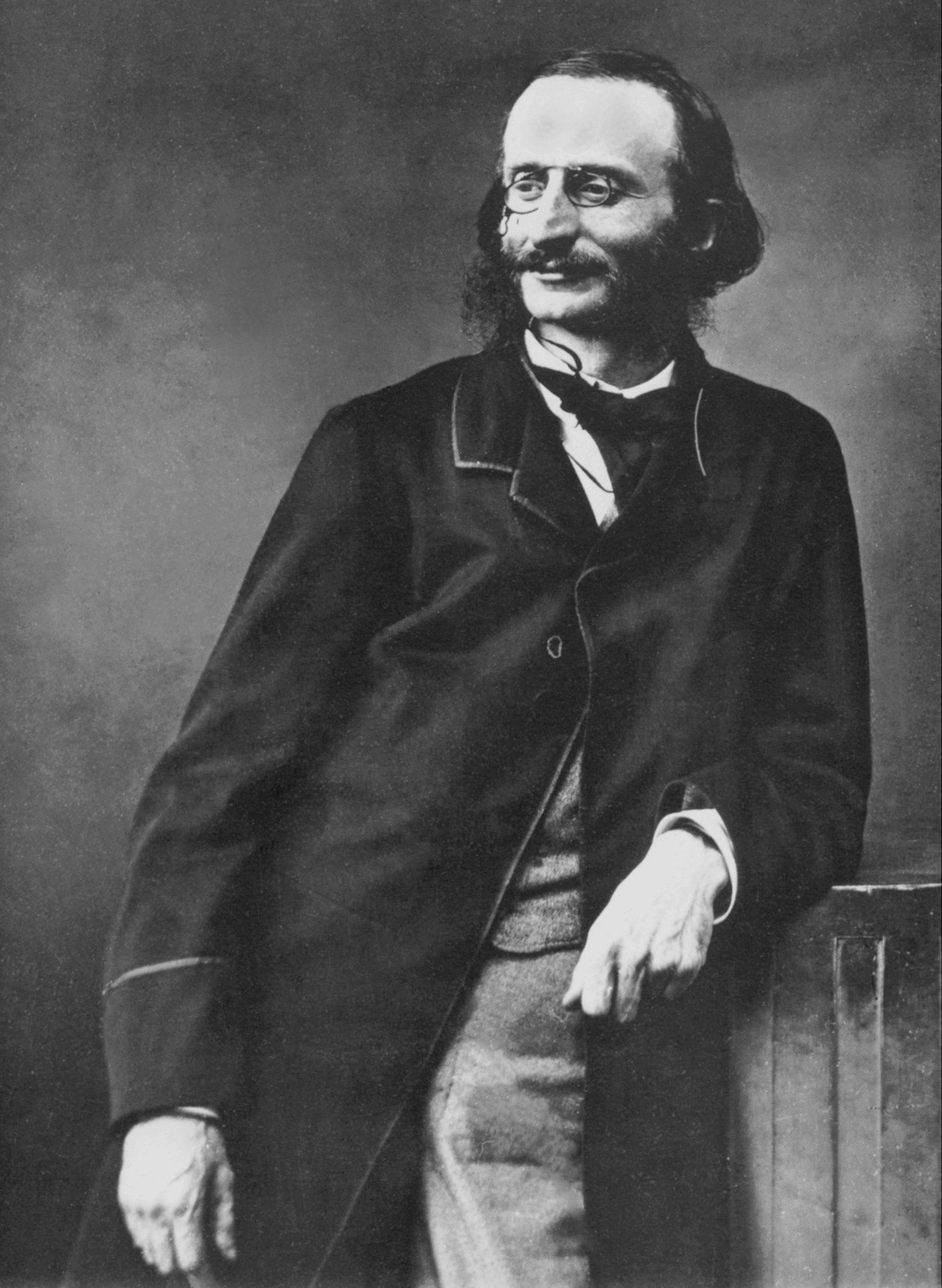
- Jacques Offenbach
- Librettist: Henri Chivot; Alfred Duru
- Language: French
- Premiere: 30 September 1868; Théâtre des Bouffes Parisiens

L'île de Tulipatan (The Island of Tulipatan) is an opéra bouffe (a form of operetta), in one act by Jacques Offenbach to an original French libretto by Henri Chivot and Alfred Duru.

It was first performed at the Théâtre des Bouffes Parisiens, Paris, on 30 September 1868. It was revived by the Compagnie Les Brigands at the Théâtre de l'Athénée as part of a double-bill with Croquefer in December 2012.

== Roles ==
Role	Voice type	Premiere Cast, 30 September 1868, (Conductor: Jacques Offenbach)
Cacatois XXII, Duke of Tulipatan	tenor	Jean-François Berthelier
Alexis, his son although truly his daughter	soprano	Castello
Romboïdal, the Duke's Grand Marshal	tenor	Hyppolite Eugène-Marie Bonnet
Theodorine, Romboïdal's wife	mezzo-soprano	Félicia Thierret
Hermosa, "daughter" of Romboïdal and Théodorine, although truly their son	tenor	Victor

== Synopsis ==
Octogène Romboïdal is the great steward of the supreme ruler of Tulipatan, Cacatois XXII. Romboïdal blames his wife Théodorine for their daughter Hermosa’s continual boyish behaviour. Hermosa enters firing off a rifle, and her father reproaches her for her neglect of needlework and the piano, but the tomboy is defended by her mother. Romboïdal mentions how gentle and gracious the prince Alexis, son of Cacatois, is; Hermosa finds him charming and very pretty.

Next Cacatois and his suite enter to visit Romboïdal, followed by Alexis and his pages, the boy grieving for the loss of his pet hummingbird, for which he is mocked by his father. As soon as the parents have left, Hermosa and Alexis burst into a joyful song of their affection and Hermosa instructs the boy in how to declare love to her, but they are surprised by the return of Théodorine and Romboïdal just as Alexis says he will only marry Hermosa. Alexis demands that Romboïdal go with him to Cacatois to ask his consent.

Now Théodorine confesses to her daughter that she is a son – an interminable war at her birth made her mother fearful for her doing military service and she therefore registered Hermosa as a girl. She worries how she is going to break the news to her husband whom she has fooled for 18 years.

Romboïdal returns, sends his wife on an errand then tells his daughter that Duke Cacatois was so determined to have a male heir after three daughters that his wife and Romboïdal telegraphed the ruler at war to say that he now had a son – and for 18 years Cacatois has thought he has a boy. Hermosa goes off, dancing, to the surprise of Romboïdal, who is more astonished when Alexis, who has overheard some of this conversation, comes on in a dress.

Hermosa now re-enters dressed as a dashing guards officer. After a barcarolle Cacatois demands that Romboïdal and Théodorine consent for their daughter to wed his son Alexis. The confused couple eventually reveal their deception to their ruler, as the marriage procession enters. Cacatois simply declares that he will remarry and try again for a son.

=== Musical numbers ===
- Ouverture
- No. 1 – Couplets d'Hermosa – "Vive le tintamarre!"
- No. 2A – Chorus – "Vive le grand Cacatois!"
- No. 2B – Couplets du Canard – "Prince doux et fort débonnaire"
- No. 2C – Couplets du Colibri – "J'ai perdu mon ami"
- No. 3 – Duetto – Hermosa and Alexis – "J'aime tout ce qui sonne"
- No. 4 – Couplets – Duetto – Hermosa and Alexis – "Si, comme vous, j'étais un homme"
- No. 5 – Air de Théodorine – "Je vais chercher les petites cuillers"
- No. 6 – Duo – Hermosa and Romboïdal – "Tu connais ce secret terrible"
- No. 7 – Duettino – Hermosa and Alexis – "Quoi c'est vous! Oui, c'est moi"
- No. 8 – Barcarolle – Bouffe – Théodorine, Romboïdal, Cacatois and Chorus – "Dans Venezia la belle"
- No. 8b – Marche Nuptiale
- No. 9 – Couplet Final – "A la fin de la pièce"

== Recordings ==
- Orchestre Lyrique de l'O.R.T.F. (Paris) conducted by Marcel Cariven in 1958 (from radio broadcast), Lina Dachary (Alexis), Joseph Peyron (Hermosa), Dominique Tirmont (Cacatois XXII), Jacques Pruvost (Romboidal), Denise Benoît (Théodorine)
- Chorus and Orchester of Hamburg Radio conducted by Paul Burkhard in 1958, with Anneliese Rothenberger (Alexis), Ferry Gruber (Hermosa), Willy Hofmann (Cacatois XXII), Horst Günter (Romboidal), Gisela Litz (Theodorine) - (in German)
- Orchester der Deutschen Oper am Rhein conducted by Carlos Kleiber in 1962 – Profil Edition Günter Hänssler, with Eva Kasper (Alexis), Alfons Holte (Hermosa), Sanders Schier (Cacatois XXII), Fritz Ollendorff (Romboidal), Anni Körner (Theodorine) – (in German)
- Les Solistes de Liège conducted by Emanuel Koch in 1984 – TLP Records, Claudine Granger (Alexis), Stéfano Memma (Hermosa), Yerry Mertz (Cacatois XXII), Thierry Migliorini (Romboidal), Marcelle Rieu (Théodorine)
- Light Opera of New York conducted by Tyson Deaton in 2017 – Albany Records. Claire Kuttler (Alexis), Tom Mulder (Hermosa), Victor Khodadad (Cacatois XXII), Chad Kranak (Romboidal), Heather Jones (Théodorine) (First recording in English – full score with slightly cut version of dialogue.)
- Excerpts have also appeared on the anthologies 'Offenbach au menu' and 'Entre Nous'.
