= Bibliothèque-Musée de l'Opéra National de Paris =

Library and museum within the Opéra Garnier, Paris

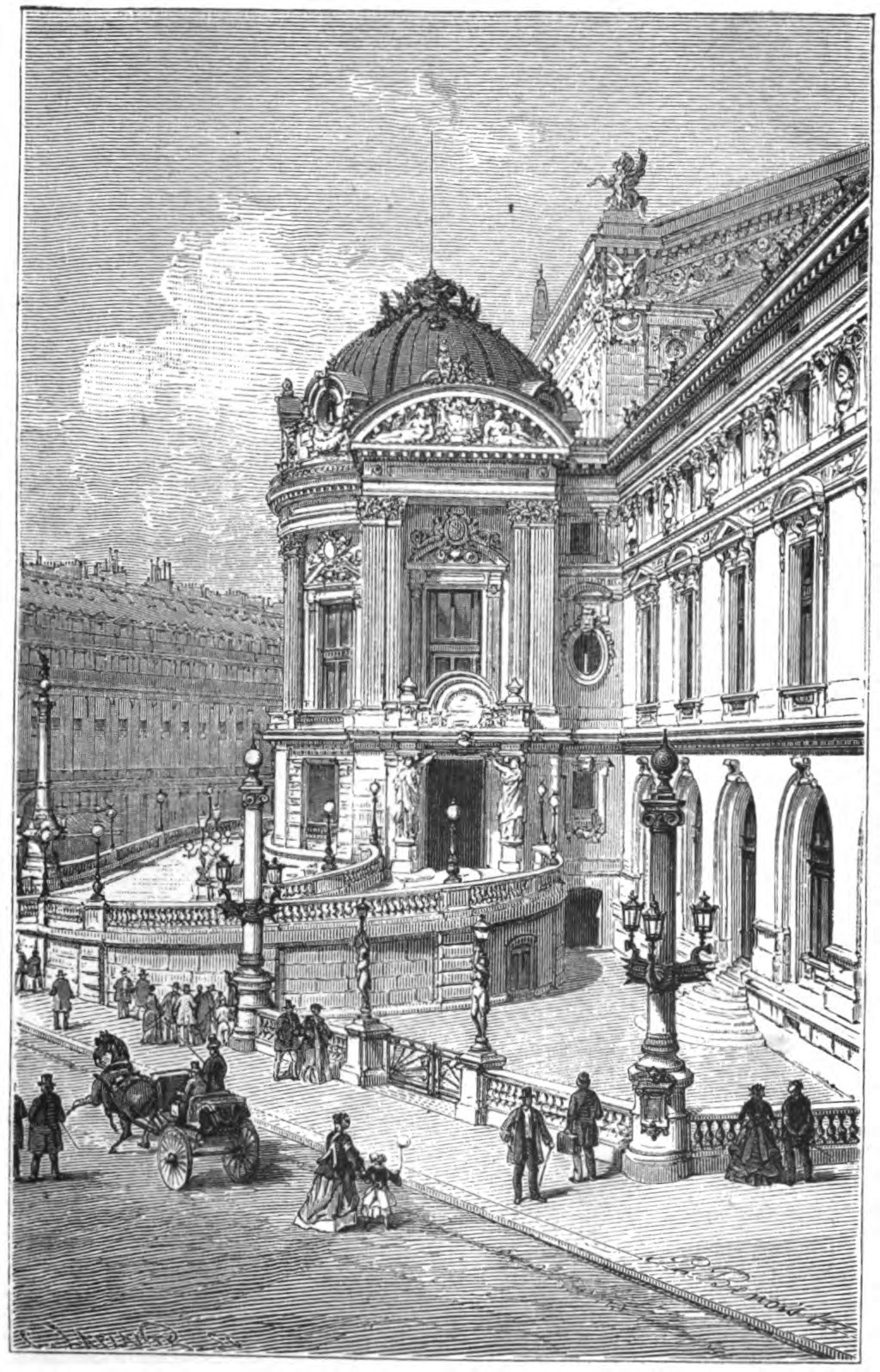
- The Emperor's Pavilion of the Palais Garnier, site of the Bibliothèque de l'Opéra (1875)
- Interactive fullscreen map
- Location: Paris, France
- Coordinates: 48°52′19″N 2°19′52″E

The Bibliothèque-Musée de l'Opéra National de Paris (French pronunciation: [biblijɔtɛk myze də lɔpeʁa nɑsjɔnal də paʁi]) is a library and museum of the Paris Opera and is located in the 9th arrondissement at 8 rue Scribe, Paris, France. It is no longer managed by the Opera, but instead is part of the Music Department of the National Library of France (Bibliothèque nationale de France or BnF). The Paris Opera Library-Museum is open daily; an admission fee is charged.

== Emperor's Pavilion ==
The Library-Museum is housed in the Palais Garnier in the Rotonde de l'Empereur, a pavilion on the west side of the theatre, which was originally designed to be the private entrance for Emperor Napoleon III. Thus, the Emperor's could directly enter in the building and avoid any assassination attempt. The library is located near the intersection of the rue Scribe with the rue Auber, streets which are named after the librettist Eugène Scribe and the composer Daniel Auber, both of whom had works performed by the Paris Opera.

After the Emperor's death in 1873 and the proclamation of the French Third Republic in 1870, President Mac-Mahon refused to use this Pavilion as a private space for the head of state. Charles Nuitter succeeded in compelling Charles Garnier to transform the pavilion into a space for the conservation of the Opera's books and archives.

== The archives and the library ==
From the time of the creation of the Paris Opera in 1861 until the middle of the 19th century there was no official entity in charge of the preservation and management of archival materials produced by the activities of the Opera and its associated theatre. The creation of an archives service and a library was integrated into the project entrusted to the architect Charles Garnier for the construction of a new opera house to replace the Opera's former theatre, the Salle Le Peletier. Thus the current Paris Opera Library-Museum traces its origin to two former services of the Opera, the archives and the library, each created in 1866. At that time, the Opera director became an entrepreneur. Expenses exceeded the receipts, and the government needed a strong man to run the establishment but was afraid that the archives would be sold to generate money.

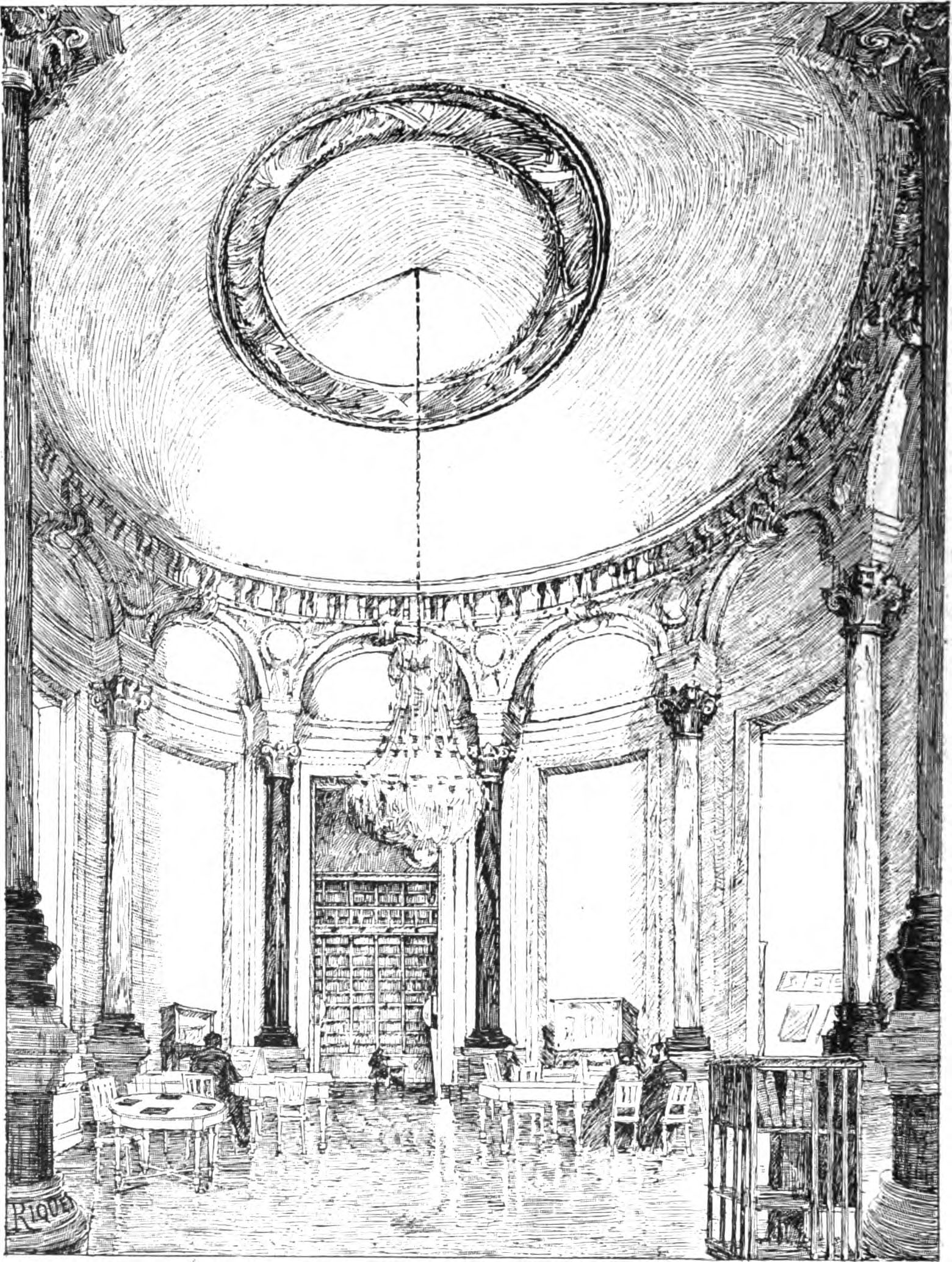
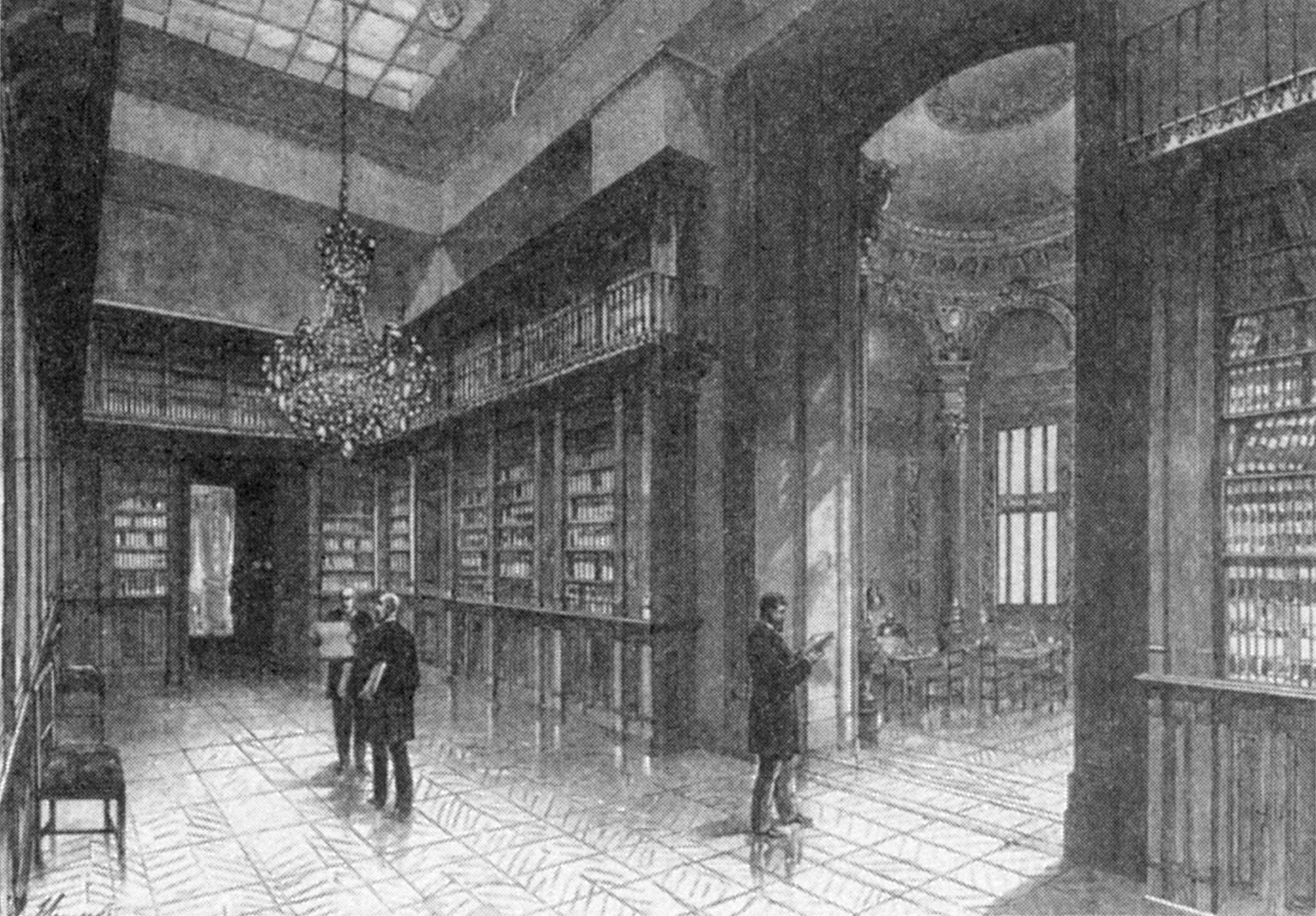
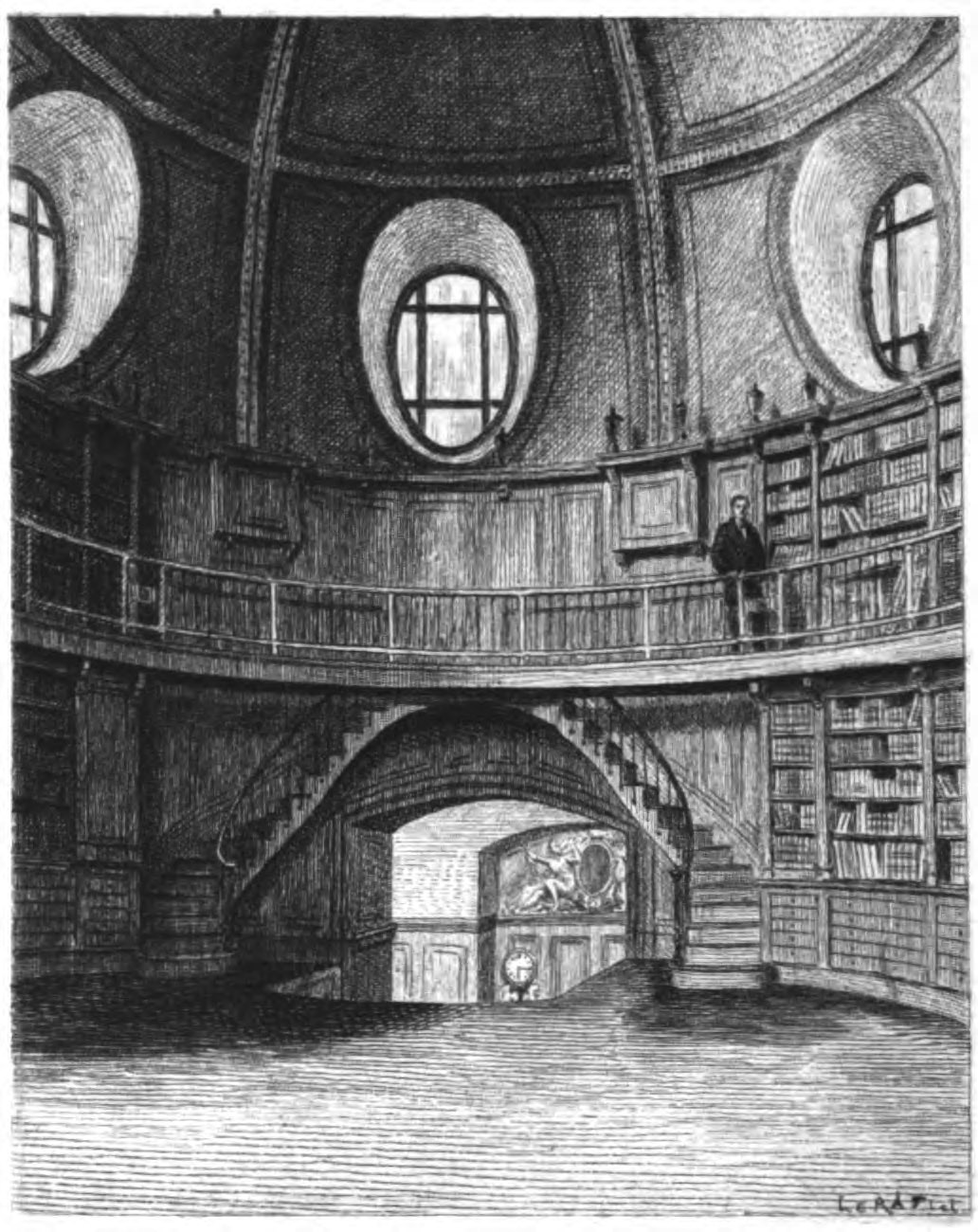
Three rooms in the Bibliothèque de l'Opéra in the 19th century

Around 1863 Charles Nuitter had begun cataloging the Opera's archives, and on 15 May 1866, he became the official archivist. He also published several books on the history of the company. Théodore Lajarte was appointed librarian in 1873 and embarked on the systematic organization of the Opera's scores and instrumental parts. In 1876 he first published his two-volume inventory of the library's holdings covering the period from 1671 to 1876.

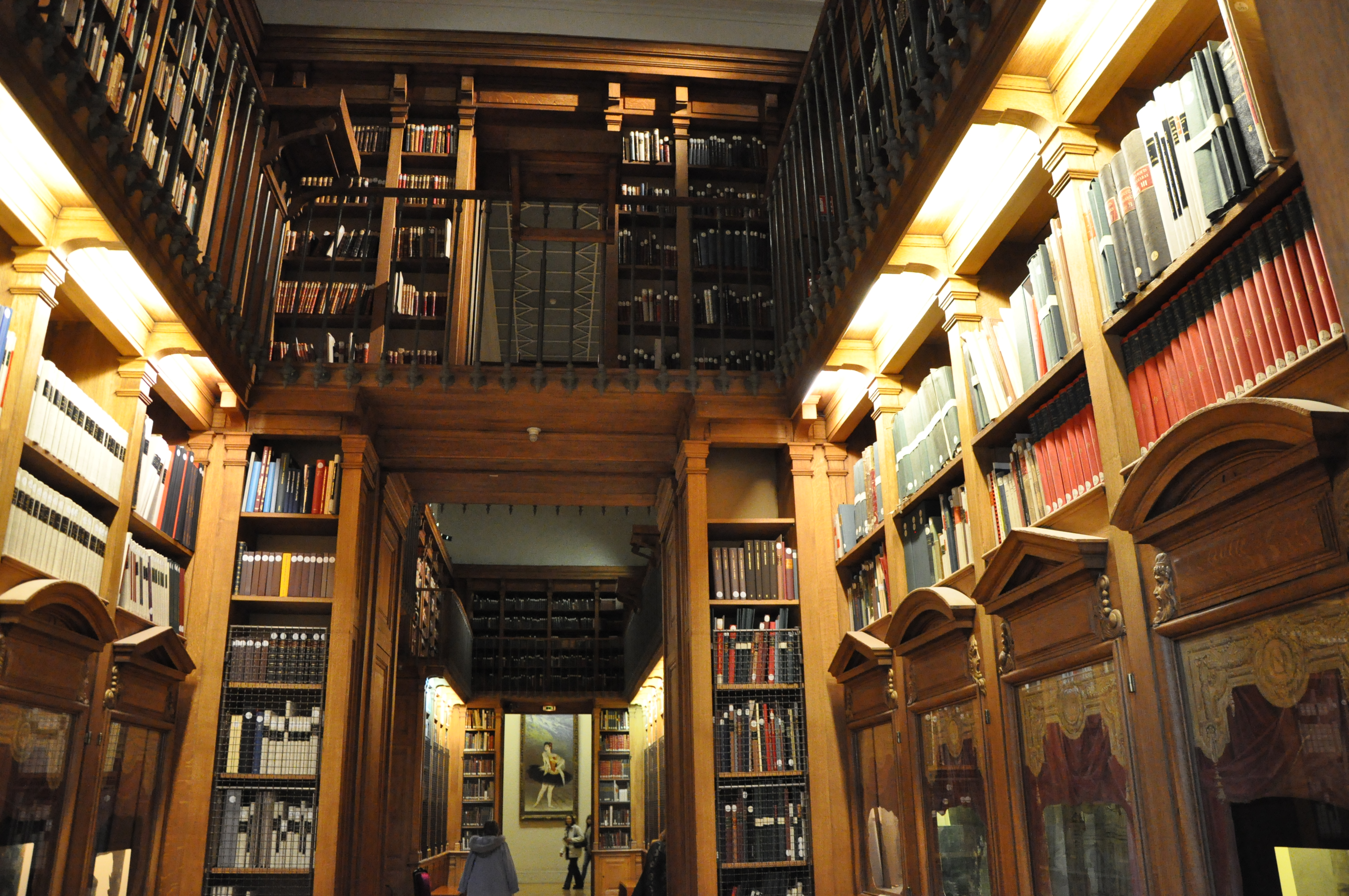
The library (2012)

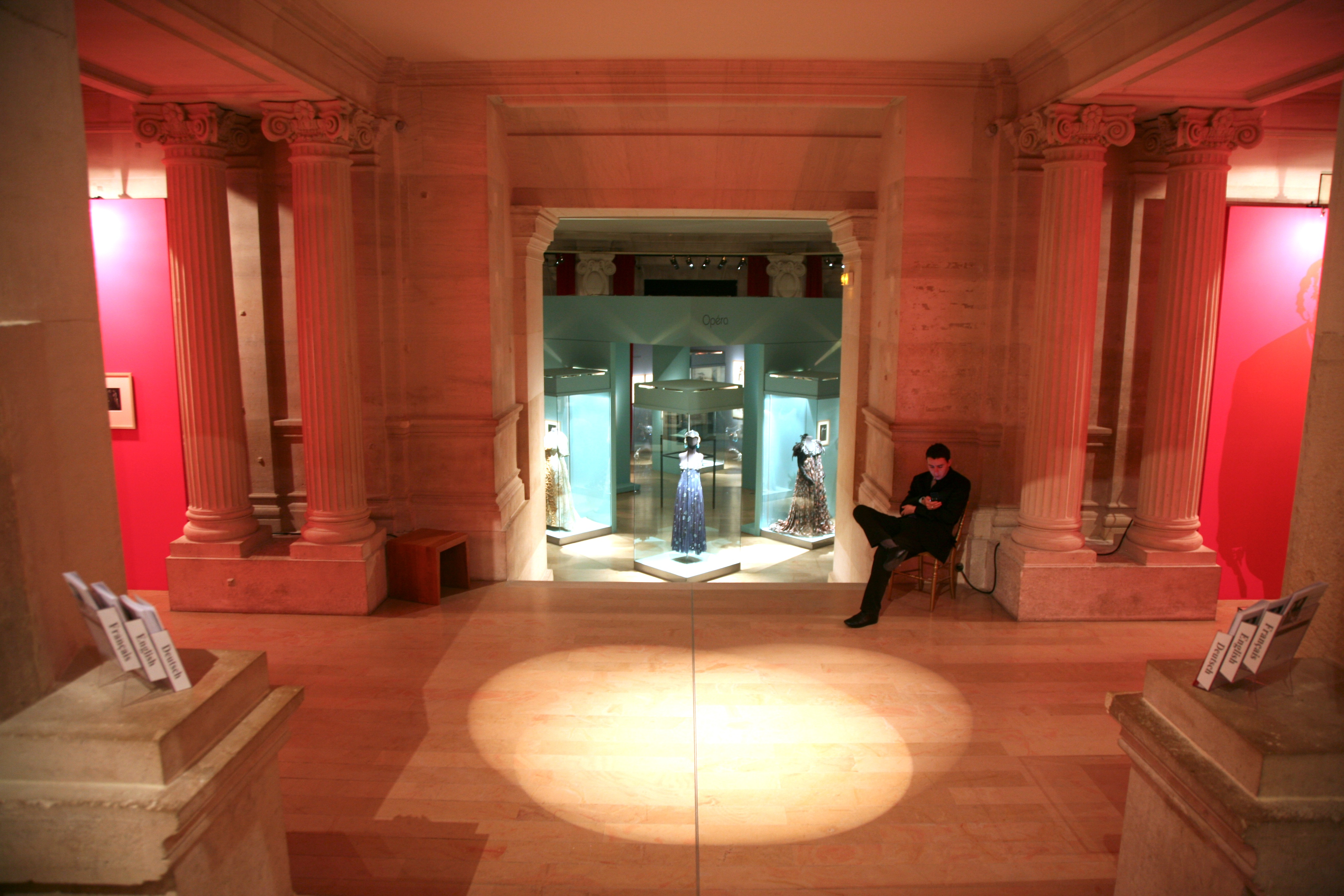
Entrance to an exhibition room

The archives and the library were soon merged, and in 1881 augmented with a museum open to the public. In 1899, Nuitter was succeeded by his assistant Charles Malherbe. At first, the Opera Library-Museum was attached to the State Secretariat of the Fine Arts (Secrétariat d'État aux Beaux-Arts), but in 1935, it became part of the National Library and in 1942 became a part of the newly established National Library's Music Department.

Much of the library is little changed from its original appearance in the 19th century. Access to the library may be difficult at times (the entrance is through the main foyer of the opera house), and it is advisable to call ahead to confirm the hours when it is open.

Today, the Library conserves around 600,000 documents related to the history of the Opéra and the Opéra-Comique, including about 100,000 books, 250,000 autograph letters, 16,000 scores, 30,000 libretti, 100,000 photographs, and 30,000 prints.

== The museum ==
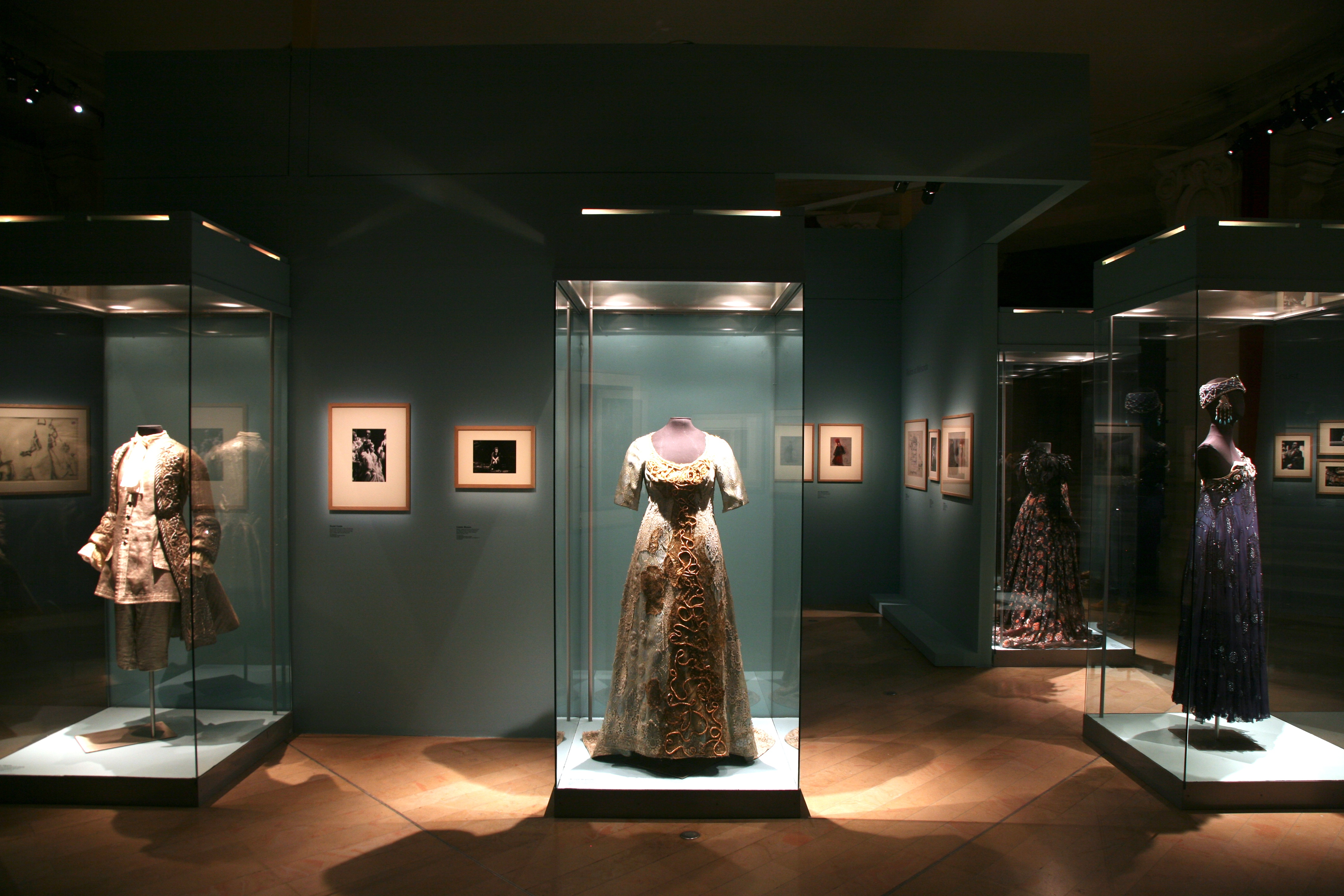
Musée de l'Opéra (2011).

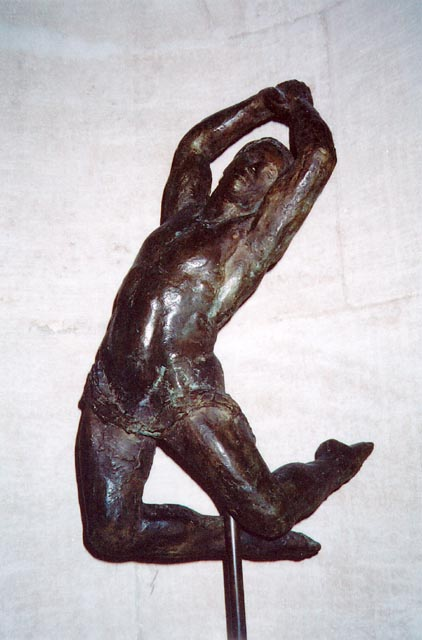
Dancer Alexandre Kalioujny by Jacques Gestalder

The modern museum has five rooms which display three centuries of the Paris Opera's history through paintings, costumes, drawings of scenery, and scale models of set designs. Altogether, the museum conserves 8 500 objects.

At the top of the stairs which lead to the museum is a bronze by the sculptor Jacques Gestalder, which depicts the dancer Alexandre Kalioujny in mid-leap during a performance of Michel Fokine's ballet Les danses polovtsiennes, which is based on the Polovtsian Dances of Borodin's Prince Igor.

Visitors are also able to see shelves of books and scores, which are protected by grilles. These materials include fifteen thousand scores and thirty thousand librettos and are accessible to the public on days when the museum is not open for tours. The museum's collections are too extensive to be displayed all at one time, as they consist of approximately 8,500 objects, including 2,500 models of sets, 500 set design drawings, and 3,000 pieces of costume jewelry.

The Library-Museum has organized more than 25 exhibitions since 1992, in collaboration with the BnF and others. Some of the items in the collection have also been displayed at the Musée d'Orsay.

== See also ==
- List of museums in Paris
- List of music museums
- Palais Garnier
- Bibliothèque nationale de France
- List of libraries in France

== Bibliography ==
- Cooper, Jeffrey (1992). "Nuitter [Truinet], Charles-Louis-Etienne" in Sadie 1992, vol. 3, pp. 635–636. Also at Oxford Music Online (subscription required).
- Gressel, Valérie (2002). Charles Nuitter : des scènes parisiennes à la Bibliothèque de l'Opéra. Hildesheim, New York: Olms. OCLC 50921243, 806234426.
- Huebner, Steven (1992). "Lajarte, Théodore (Edouard Dufaure de)" in Sadie 1992, vol. 2, p. 1081. Also available at Oxford Music Online (subscription required).
- Lajarte, Théodore de (1878). Bibliothèque musicale du Théâtre de l'Opéra, volume 1 [1671–1791]. Paris: Librairie des Bibliophiles. View at Google Books.
- Lajarte, Théodore de (1878). Bibliothèque musicale du Théâtre de l'Opéra, volume 2 [1793–1876]. Paris: Librairie des Bibliophiles. View at Google Books.
- Lebeau, Elisabeth (2001). "Malherbe, Charles (Théodore)" in Sadie 2001. Also available at Oxford Music Online (subscription required).
- Nuitter, Charles (1875). Le nouvel Opéra (with 59 engravings). Paris: Hachette. Copies 1, 2, and 3 at Google Books.
- Nuitter, Charles (1878). Histoire et description du nouvel Opéra. Paris: Plon. View at Gallica.
- Nuitter, Charles; Thoinan, Ernest (1886). Les origines de l'Opéra français (in French). Paris: E. Plon, Nourrit et Cie. Copies 1 and 2 at Google Books.
- Sadie, Stanley, editor (1992). The New Grove Dictionary of Opera (4 volumes). London: Macmillan. ISBN 978-1-56159-228-9.
- Sadie, Stanley (2001). The New Grove Dictionary of Music and Musicians, 2nd edition. London: Macmillan. ISBN 978-1-56159-239-5 (hardcover). OCLC 419285866 (eBook).
- Simeone, Nigel (2000). Paris – A Musical Gazetteer. New Haven: Yale University Press. ISBN 978-0-300-08053-7.
