= Étienne Tréfeu =

French librettist, song writer and theatre manager (1821-1903)

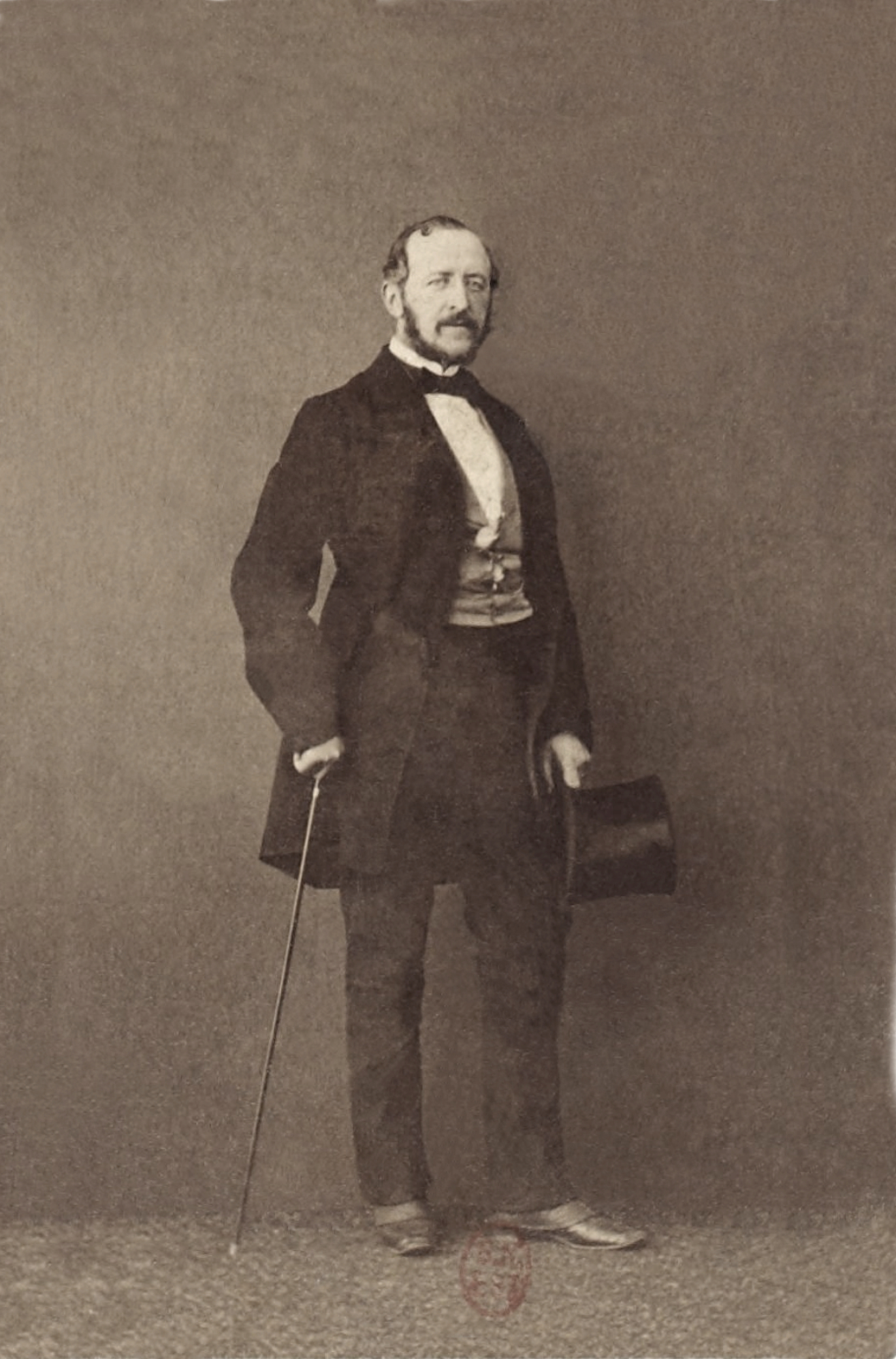
Étienne Tréfeu (ca. 1860)

Étienne Victor Tréfeu (de Tréval) (born Saint-Lô, Manche, September 25, 1821 – died Paris, June, 1903), was a French librettist, song writer and theatre manager. He is best known for his work with Jacques Offenbach. He originally came to prominence as a writer of popular songs. In 1873 he became the administrator of the Théâtre de la Gaîté in Paris.

== Works ==
- 1855: Le Rêve d'une nuit d'été, saynète in 1 act by Jacques Offenbach
- 1857: Croquefer, ou Le dernier des paladins, opérette bouffe en 1 act by Jacques Offenbach, libretto with Adolphe Jaime fils
- 1859: Geneviève de Brabant, opéra bouffon in 2 acts by Jacques Offenbach, libretto by Étienne Tréfeu and Adolphe Jaime fils
- 1863: Il Signor Fagotto, one-act opéra comique by Jacques Offenbach, libretto by Charles Nuitter and Étienne Tréfeu
- 1864: Le soldat magicien, one-act opéra comique by Jacques Offenbach, libretto by Charles Nuitter and Étienne Tréfeu
- 1864: Jeanne qui pleure et Jean qui rit, opérette en 1 acte de Jacques Offenbach, libretto by Charles Nuitter and Étienne Tréfeu
- 1865: Coscoletto ou le Lazzarone, two-act opéra comique by Jacques Offenbach, libretto by Charles Nuitter and Étienne Tréfeu
- 1869: La princesse de Trébizonde, opéra bouffe in 2 then 3 acts by Jacques Offenbach, libretto by Charles Nuitter and Étienne Tréfeu
- 1869: La Romance de la rose, one-act operetta by Jacques Offenbach, libretto by Étienne Tréfeu and Jules Prével
- 1871: Boule-de-Neige, three-act opéra bouffe by Jacques Offenbach, libretto by Charles Nuitter and Étienne Tréfeu
- 1874: Whittington, grand-opéra-bouffe-féerie in 3 acts by Jacques Offenbach, libretto by Charles Nuitter and Étienne Tréfeu adapted in English by Henry Brougham Farnie

== Bibliography ==
Tréfeu (de Tréval), Etienne (Victor) by Andrew Lamb, in 'The New Grove Dictionary of Opera', ed. Stanley Sadie (London, 1992) ISBN 0-333-73432-7

fILS DE jEAN trefeu le CHOUESNES de FREVAL 1788 St Pierre de Semilly (50) - D.1869 Saint Lô (50) marié à Lasténie Reine de TOCQUEVILLE, fille de Jean Hubert de TOCQUEVILLE et de Anne Adélaïde Sophie DUBOSC Née Vers 1781 Honfleur (14)elle-même fille de Louis Nicolas Adrien DUBOSC - cafetier, né 1734 Grandchain (27) marié à GUERARD Catherine Françoise 1785 Condé S/Vire - D. 1861 Saint lô (50) (Pts: Branche GUERARD Gille 1700-1786 Condé S/Vire (50) et THOMINE Anne 1702-1758 Ste Suzanne (50Manche)
