= Jean-François Berthelier =

French opera singer

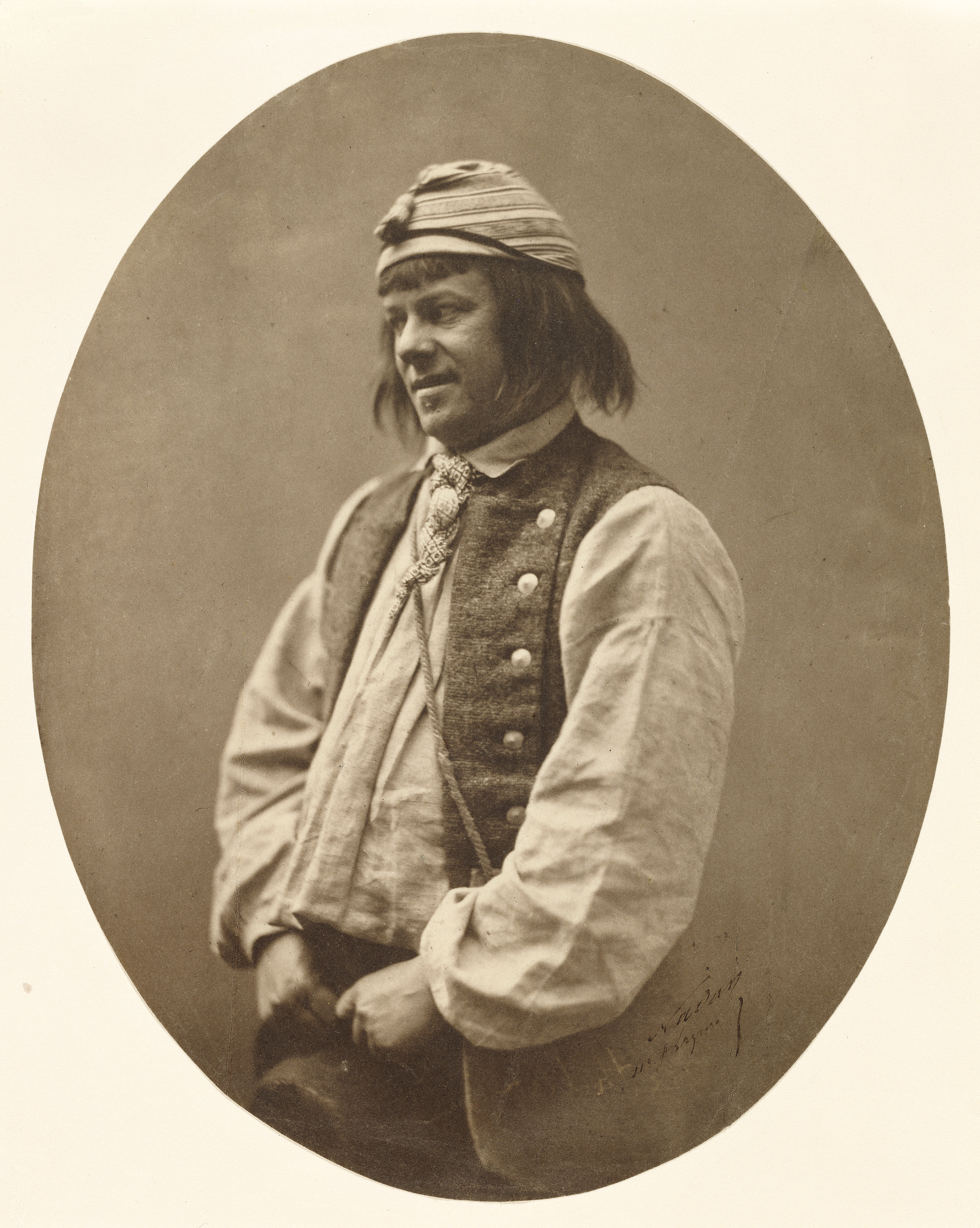
- Berthelier photographed by Nadar
- Born: 14 December 1830; Panissières, Kingdom of France
- Died: 29 September 1888 (aged 57); Paris, France
- Occupations: Actor, singer

Jean-François-Philibert Berthelier (French: [ʒɑ̃ fʁɑ̃swa filibɛʁ bɛʁtəlje]; 14 December 1830 – 29 September 1888) was a French actor and singer, who performed many light tenor roles in opéra-comique and opéra-bouffe.

== Early career ==
Berthelier was born in Panissières, the son of a notary. At eleven he became an orphan and moved in with a foster family. He initially worked as an office clerk in a bookstore in Lyon, where on the side he appeared on stage as an extra at the Théâtre des Célestins. His fine voice was noticed, and he made his operatic debut as Fernand in La favorite at a small provincial theatre in Poitiers in 1849. When that theatre closed, he moved to Paris, but after he was refused entry to the Conservatoire de Musique, he turned to singing in cafés-concerts, not without success. He also composed some songs under the pseudonym Berthel.

He was spotted by Jacques Offenbach and engaged in the inaugural company of the Bouffes-Parisiens, scoring a success in Les deux aveugles, and going on to triumph in Une nuit blanche (as Paimpol), Le violoneux (Pierre) and Ba-ta-clan (Kokikako); he is sometimes credited with 'discovering' Hortense Schneider.

From 1856 to 1862, Berthelier was a member of the Opéra-Comique company, creating parts in Barkouf by Offenbach and in Maître Pathelin by François Bazin, before leaving to appear at the Palais-Royal in La Vie parisienne and at the Bouffes-Parisiens in Les bergers, L'île de Tulipatan, La princesse de Trébizonde and Boule-de-Neige.

== Later career ==
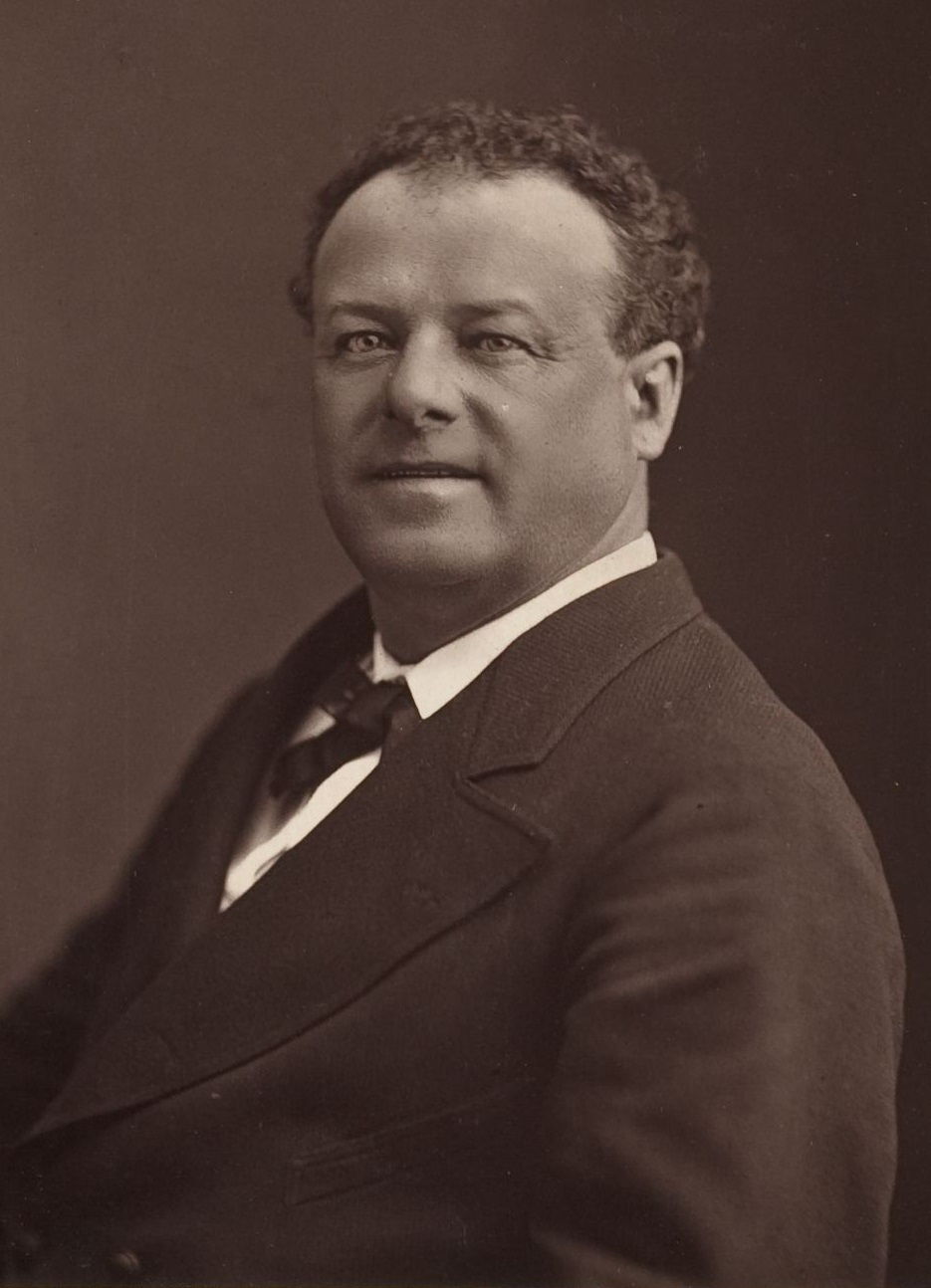
Berthelier in later years

In 1879, he sang Bertrand in Les rendez-vous bourgeois, Taboureau in the premiere of La petite mademoiselle at the Théâtre de la Renaissance, the title role in Gladiator and Dardembeuf in the revue Paris en actions at the Théâtre des Nouveautés. In 1882 he sang Moulinot in Fatinitza, and the king in the premiere of Le coeur et la main at the Nouveautés, and at the same theatre in 1883 he appeared as Tancrède in Le droit d'aînesse, Zug in Premier baiser and Tirechappe in Roi de carreau. 1884 found Berthelier as Bricoli in L’oiseau bleu, Karamatoff in Babolin, Hercule III in La nuit aux soufflets, and the Marquis de Valpointu in Le chateau de Tire-Larigot, and in 1885 as Chiquito in the premiere of La vie mondaine, Bardoulet in the premiere of Le petit chaperon rouge and in the revue Nouveautés de Paris. In 1886, he was at the Nouveautés as Gavaudan in the premiere of Serment d’amour, Satan in Adam et Eve and the seneschal in the premiere of Princesse Colombine. Berthelier created Chaudillac in Dix jours aux Pyrénées at the Théâtre de la Gaîté, and Benoit in Ninon at the Nouveautés in 1887.

In one of the first French adaptations of Die Fledermaus (as Le tzigane), he played Zappoli. Among other works in which he appeared are La veuve du Malabar, Les cent vierges, Le petit duc, Le grand Mogol, Les braconniers, and La boulangère a des écus.

Berthelier died in Paris.
