= Jean-Claude Yon =

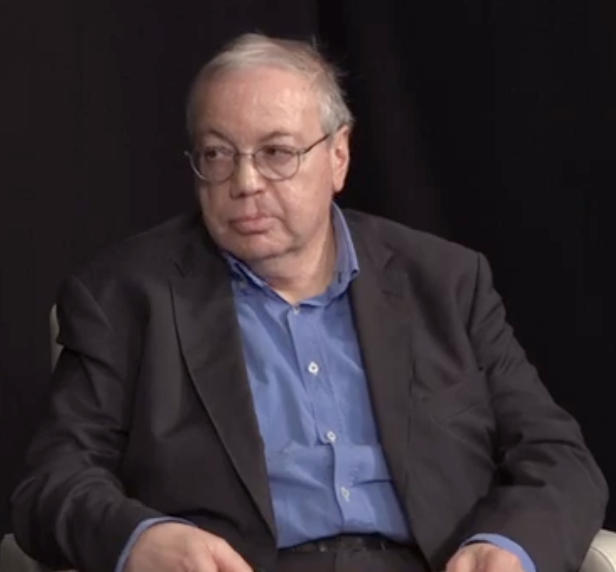
- In a 2025 interview
- Born: 22 February 1966 (age 60); Paris, France
- Education: École normale supérieure de Fontenay-Saint-Cloud
- Occupations: Academic, historian

Jean-Claude Yon (born 22 February 1966) is a French academic and historian. He has specialised in the world of 19th century theatre and opera, notably the work of Scribe and Offenbach. He is professor at the Université de Versailles-Saint-Quentin-en-Yvelines.

== Career ==
Yon entered the École normale supérieure de Fontenay-Saint-Cloud in 1987, obtaining a master's degree in contemporary history with his study Les notaires parisiens sous le Second Empire (Parisian notaries during the Second Empire) which went on to win the Prix Favard de Langlade offered by the Institut international d’histoire du notariat in 1993. His doctoral thesis examined Eugène Scribe, la fortune et la liberté (Eugène Scribe, destiny and freedom) and was defended in January 1994 at the université Panthéon-Sorbonne. Along with Jean-Christophe Keck, Robert Pourvoyer, Peter Hawig and Alain Fraison he was involved in the creation of the Offenbach Edition Keck, a new Offenbach critical edition to be published by Boosey & Hawkes and Bote & Bock. Yon, in his 2000 study, notably advanced understanding of Offenbach's place within the sociological history of his times. Yon took part in the 2004 documentary directed by Gérald Caillat The Missing Manuscript, about the textual history of Les Contes d'Hoffmann.

Président of the scientific committee of the 'Unité de formation et de recherche' (training and research unit) in Social Sciences and Humanities of the Université de Versailles-Saint-Quentin-en-Yvelines (November 2006 to June 2010), he was elected in June 2009 to the council of UFR, then in October 2010 to the council of the Institut d’études culturelles (IEC) then the council of the Institut d'études culturelles et internationales (IECI).

Professor of contemporary history at the Université de Versailles-Saint-Quentin-en-Yvelines (2012), in 2014 he became the Director of its Centre d'histoire culturelle des sociétés contemporaines (Centre for cultural history of contemporary society). He was also responsible for projects with the Musée d'Orsay from 1992 to 2006 and co-ordinator of twelve exhibition brochures from 1993 to 2000.

As "Historien spécialiste de l'opéra, écrivain, professeur des universités" Yon was awarded Chevalier of the Ordre des Arts et des Lettres in the summer of 2021.

== Publications ==
Yon's preference is to work in collaboration with other fields "in a multidisciplinary approach and to work with literature, musicology, language and theatrical studies specialists". He believes that approaches can complement and enrich each other and at the heart of such a collaboration the historian must "opérer la mise en contexte des œuvres" (contextualize the works). In relation to Offenbach or Scribe he believes it preferable to confront them through history, literature, performing arts, musicology and law, in connection, for example, with censorship, or the right to whistle in theatres in the 19th century”.

Jean-Claude Yon has organized many symposia and study-days as well as participating in radio broadcasts. He is the author of many articles and books:

- Offenbach, exhibition catalogue edited with Laurent Fraison, Réunion des Musées Nationaux, Les Dossiers du Musée d’Orsay, n°58, 1996, 167 p.
- Théophile Gautier, la critique en liberté, exhibition catalogue co-edited with Stéphane Guégan, Réunion des Musées Nationaux, Les Dossiers du Musée d’Orsay, n°62, 1997, 176 p.
- Eugène Scribe, la fortune et la liberté, Librairie Nizet, 2000, 390 p.
- Jacques Offenbach, Gallimard, « NRF Biographies », 2000, 796 p.
- In collaboration with Jacques-Olivier Boudon and Jean-Claude Caron, Religion et culture en Europe au XIXe siècle (1800-1914), Armand Colin, « U », 2001, 287 p.
- Le Second Empire, politique, société, culture, Armand Colin, « U », 2004, 256 p.
- Histoire culturelle de la France au XIXe siècle, Armand Colin, « U », 2010, 318 p.
- Une histoire du théâtre à Paris de la Révolution à la Grande Guerre, Paris, Aubier, 2012, 437 p.
- Théâtres parisiens : un patrimoine du XIXe siècle, photographs by Sabine Hartl and Daniel-Olaf Meyer, Paris, Citadelles et Mazenod, 2013

== Awards ==
- Grand prix d'histoire du romantisme 2000 de la Maison de Chateaubriand, for Eugène Scribe, la fortune et la liberté.
- Prix Catenacci de l'Académie des beaux-arts et grand prix 2000 de littérature musicale de l'Académie Charles-Cros, for Jacques Offenbach.
- Prix Second Empire 2005 de la Fondation Napoléon et prix Napoléon III 2005 de la Ville de Boulogne-sur-mer, for Le Second Empire. Politique, société, culture.
- Prix Thorlet 2012 of the Académie des sciences morales et politiques, for Une histoire du théâtre à Paris de la Révolution à la Grande Guerre.
