= La Vie parisienne (operetta) =

Opera by Jacques Offenbach

- Opéra bouffe by Jacques Offenbach
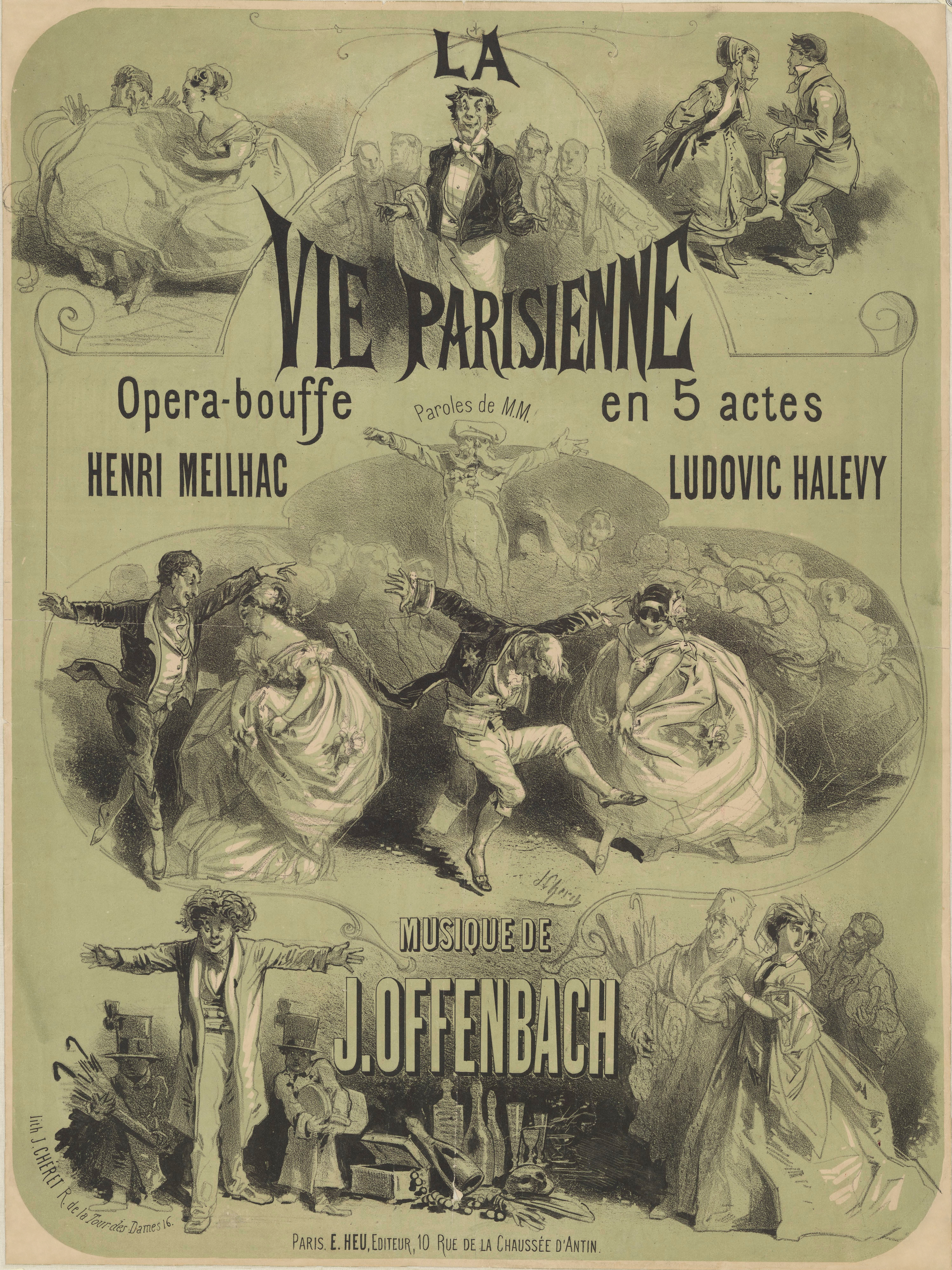
- Poster by Jules Chéret for the original production
- Librettist: Henri Meilhac; Ludovic Halévy
- Language: French
- Premiere: 31 October 1866; Théâtre du Palais-Royal, Paris

La vie parisienne (French pronunciation: [la vi paʁizjɛn], Parisian life) is an opéra bouffe, or operetta, composed by Jacques Offenbach, with a libretto by Henri Meilhac and Ludovic Halévy.

This work was Offenbach's first full-length piece to portray contemporary Parisian life, unlike his earlier period pieces and mythological subjects. It became one of Offenbach's most popular operettas.

In 1864 the Théâtre du Palais-Royal presented a comedy by Meilhac and Halévy entitled Le Photographe (The Photographer), which featured a character called Raoul Gardefeu, the lover of Métella, trying to seduce a baroness. Two years earlier, a comedy by the same authors La Clé de Métella (The Key of Métella) was played at the Théâtre du Vaudeville. These two pieces presage the libretto of La vie parisienne which can be dated from late 1865.

== Performance history ==
It was first produced in a five-act version at the Théâtre du Palais-Royal, Paris, on 31 October 1866. The work was revived in four acts (without the original fourth act) on 25 September 1873, at the Théâtre des Variétés, Paris.

The Théâtre des Variétés revived it in 1875 with Dupuis, Grenier, Cooper, Berthelier and Bouffar, Berthal and Devéria; It was rarely absent from the Parisian stage for many years with Dupuis returning repeatedly to his role and singers such as Jeanne Granier, Baron, Albert Brasseur, Germaine Gallois, Anna Tariol-Baugé, Max Dearly and Mistinguett taking part in the revivals.

In 1958 a notable production was mounted at the Théâtre du Palais-Royal, with Jean-Pierre Granval, Jean Desailly, Pierre Bertin, Jean-Louis Barrault, Jean Parédès, Suzy Delair, Madeleine Renaud, Simone Valère, and Denise Benoît. The Théâtre national de l'Opéra-Comique mounted the work in 1931 and then in 1974. Later Paris productions included the Théâtre du Châtelet in 1980 with Michel Roux, Daniele Chlostawa and Patrick Minard, and the Théâtre de Paris in 1985 with Gabriel Bacquier, Jane Rhodes and Martine Masquelin.

It was first given in London at the Holborn Theatre on 30 March 1872 in an adaptation by F. C. Burnand. The New York premiere was at the Booth Theatre, on 12 June 1876.

== Roles ==
Roles, voice types, premiere cast
Role	Voice type	Premiere cast, 31 October 1866 Conductor: Offenbach	Revised four-act version Premiere cast, 25 September 1873 Conductor: Offenbach
Bobinet, a Parisian dandy	tenor or high baritone	Gil-Pérès	Pierre Eugène Grenier
An employee of the railways	speaking role	Millaux	
Raoul de Gardefeu, a Parisian dandy	tenor	Priston	Henri Venderjench
Métella, a demi-mondaine	mezzo-soprano	Honorine	Devéria/Céline Van Ghell
Gontran, Métella's friend	tenor	Coste	
Joseph, a guide	speaking role	Martal	
Le Baron de Gondremarck, a Swedish traveller	baritone	Hyacinthe	José Dupuis
La Baronne de Gondremarck, his wife	soprano	Céline Montaland	Juliette Grandville
The Brazilian, a wealthy person	baritone	Jules Brasseur	
Alphonse, Gardefeu's valet	speaking role	Ferdinand	
Frick, a bootmaker	baritone	Jules Brasseur	Jean-François Berthelier
Gabrielle, a glovemaker	soprano	Zulma Bouffar	Zulma Bouffar
Pauline, a chambermaid	soprano	Elmire Paurelle	
Prosper, a servant	baritone	Jules Brasseur	Jean-François Berthelier
Urbain, a servant	baritone	Louis Lassouche	Louis Lassouche
Clara, the concierge's niece	soprano	Henry	
Leonie, the concierge's niece	mezzo-soprano	Bédard	
Louise, the concierge's niece	mezzo-soprano	Breton	Estelle Lavigne
Madame de Quimper-Karadec, Bobinet's aunt	mezzo-soprano	Félicia Thierret	
Mme de Folle-Verdure, her nièce	mezzo-soprano	Léontine Massin	
Alfred, head waiter of the Café Anglais	baritone		Léonce
Caroline, the concierge's niece			Julia H.
Julie, the concierge's niece			Magne
Augustine, the concierge's niece			Maria
Albertine, a demi-mondaine			Pauline
Charlotte, a demi-mondaine			V. Klein
Chorus: Railway workers, Postmen, Travellers, Boot-makers, Glove-makers, Waiters, Masked men and women

== Synopsis ==
=== Act 1 ===
The story begins at the Gare de l'Ouest, where the employees list the provenance of trains arriving from different places in France ("Nous sommes employés de la ligne de l'Ouest"). Two Parisian dandies, Bobinet and Gardefeu are waiting for the train from Rambouillet, but avoid each other while they walk around. They have fallen out over the demi-mondaine Métella. She arrives with a third man and pretends not to recognize the two previous lovers. Her rejection reunites the two friends and they vow to seek a better class of mistress ("Elles sont tristes, les marquises"). While wondering how he will achieve this Gardefeu sees his former servant Joseph, now a tourist guide. Joseph reveals that he is to meet a Swedish baron and his wife who he is to show around Paris but for a sum agrees to let Gardefeu take his place. While he goes to look for the baron, Gardefeu wonders what will happen with the baroness ("Ce que c'est pourtant que la vie !") The Baron and Baroness Gondremarck enter and he promises to show them everything they want to see in the French capital ("Jamais, foi de cicérone"). The station fills with more passengers arriving for a good time in Paris, including a Brazilian returning after having spent his fortune once before in the city ("Je suis Brésilien, j'ai de l'or").

=== Act 2 ===
At Gardefeu's home, his glove-maker Gabrielle and his boot-maker Frick await the master's return ("Entrez ! entrez, jeune fille à l'œil bleu !"). Gardefeu continues his pretence with the Swedes, explaining that they are in an annexe to the hotel, hoping to get the baron out of the way so that he can pay attention to the baroness; the baron already has his plans based on a letter from a friend ("Dans cette ville toute pleine"). The baron then asks to take the table d'hôte. The problem of missing hotel guests is solved by getting Gabrielle and Frick and their friends to impersonate other hotel guests. Bobinet calls by and offers to stage a party for the Swedes at his absent aunt's mansion the following night, with the baron invited. The baroness finds remnants of Gardefeu's affair with Métella in her room. Métella herself now arrives hoping for a reconciliation with Gardefeu ("Vous souvient-il, ma belle") and ends with offering to entertain the baron in a few days. The guests arrive for the table d'hôte; Frick as a major ("Pour découper adroitement") and Gabrielle as a war widow ("Je suis veuve d'un colonel") and with a tyrolienne everyone retires to supper ("On est v'nu m'inviter").

=== Act 3 ===
At a party the next evening hosted by Bobinet his servants dress up as the crowd of aristocrats ("Donc, je puis me fier à vous !"). Baron Gondremarck arrives and is taken by Pauline 'Madame l'amirale' (in fact a chambermaid). Gabrielle arrives ("On va courir, on va sortir") and Bobinet as a Swiss admiral ("Votre habit a craqué dans le dos !").

Bobinet rises to greet the crowd with a drinking song ("En endossant mon uniforme") and the champagne flows ("Soupons, soupons, c'est le moment"), the baron and everyone else gets drunk.

=== Act 4 ===
The Brazilian millionaire is offering a masquerade ball at the Café Anglais. The head waiter tells his staff to be discreet during about the guests ("Avant toute chose, il faut être... Fermez les yeux"). The baron arrives for his assignation with Métella, while growing increasingly suspicious of the goings-on. Métella tells the baron to be patient ("C'est ici l'endroit redouté des mères") but she will not be his entertainment: she is in love with someone else but has brought a friend for him. The baron is furious when he discovers that her lover is Gardefeu. The Brazilian arrives, then Bobinet and Gardefeu. After showing Métella the letter ("Vous souvient-il, ma belle") she and Gardefeu are reconciled, and the baron's fury only stops when baroness intervenes. All toast Paris ("Par nos chansons et par nos cris, célébrons Paris.").

== Film versions ==
In 1935 Robert Siodmak shot a film based on the operetta in two language versions, French and English. The stars of both MLVs were Max Dearly and Conchita Montenegro. The script was by Emeric Pressburger, the dialogues by Marcel Carné and Benno Vigny. Producer was Seymour Nebenzahl. Offenbach's music was arranged by Maurice Jaubert. The French version had its premiere on 22 January 1936 in Paris, the English version was released in August 1936.

A 1967 French television production directed by Yves-André Hubert of the 1958 stage version mounted by Jean-Louis Barrault, with Jean-Pierre Granval (Bobinet), Jean Desailly (Gardefeu), Pierre Bertin (Baron), Georges Aminel (Brésilien), Jean Parédès (Frick, Prosper, Alfred), Micheline Dax (Metella), Geneviève Kervine (Baronne), Simone Valère (Gabrielle), conducted by André Girard, has been issued on DVD.

Parisian Life (1977), directed by Christian-Jaque.
