= Jean-Christophe Keck =

French musicologist and conductor (born 1964)

Jean-Christophe Keck is a French musicologist and conductor, born in Briançon, in 1964. He is particularly noted as a specialist in the works of Jacques Offenbach, and is the director of the complete critical edition in progress, named after both, Offenbach Edition Keck (OEK).

== Biography ==
As a child he played tuba in the Briançon town band and after early studies at the école de musique de Briançon he attended for two years the Conservatoire de Marseille before entering the Conservatoire national supérieur de musique de Paris. There he followed courses in conducting with Jean-Sébastien Bérault, musicology and composition with Pierre Villette, vocal studies (tenor) with Christiane Eda-Pierre, and piano. He was struck early by a passion for the music of Offenbach, through the TV series Les Folies Offenbach with Michel Serrault, the recording of Belle Hélène conducted by René Leibowitz and that of Les Contes d'Hoffmann conducted by Pierre-Michel Le Conte, with Heinz Rehfuss. He also singles out conductors Jules Gressier, Marcel Cariven and Jean Doussard who managed to create miracles of music under difficult conditions.

Alongside a singing career, in which he was engaged at the (Opéra Bastille, Festival d'Aix-en-Provence, Opéra de Lyon), he also began to conduct. He was involved in film, radio and television including some of his own compositions.

He is the musical director of Pro 05, the chamber orchestra of the Hautes-Alpes, as well as the Festival lyrique des châteaux de Bruniquel (Tarn-et-Garonne). Since 2004, he has directed the Offenbach concerts of the Orchestre des Concerts Pasdeloup. In April 2012 he conducted Ba-ta-clan and Mesdames de la Halle for the Academy of Music Hanns Eisler Berlin.

For some years Jean-Christophe Keck has been leading the work to create a critical edition of all the works of Offenbach. The Offenbach Edition Keck is being published by Boosey & Hawkes. Already Keck's editions of La Périchole, La Grande-Duchesse de Gérolstein, La Vie parisienne and Les Brigands have been successfully performed. His edition of the 1858 version of Orphée aux enfers has been highly praised. His researches have led him to acquire many important related documents and manuscripts. In a 2013 article he predicted that the edition OEK would when complete comprise 43 volumes, although he added "that won't be in my lifetime". Keck featured in the 2004 documentary directed by Gérald Caillat The Missing Manuscript, about the textual history of Les Contes d'Hoffmann.

In 2002 the Festival de Radio-France Montpellier saw the recreation of Offenbach's grand opéra romantique Les Fées du Rhin in Keck's edition. The revival of this important work won various prizes including the Prix Michel Garcin (Meilleure initiative discographique) of the Académie du disque lyrique.

The Opéra-Théâtre de Metz created his opéra-bouffe Monsieur de Chimpanzé on a libretto by Jules Verne in November 2005, conducted by Dominique Trottein. Although a work set to the libretto had been premiered at the Bouffes-Parisiens in 1858, the music had been lost, and Keck composed an entirely new score.

Keck is also a producer and presenter for France Musique.

== Discography ==
as conductor

- Ballade Symphonique, Orchestre national de Montpellier, Accord, 2005
- Le Financier et le Savetier, et autre délices, with Ghyslaine Raphanel, Franck Thézan and Éric Huchet and the Orchestre des Concerts Pasdeloup, Accord, 2007

as musicologist

- Les Fées du Rhin with Regina Schörg, Nora Gubisch, Piotr Beczała and Dalibor Jenis and the Orchestre national de Montpellier, Friedemann Layer (conductor), Accord, 2003
- La Grande-Duchesse de Gérolstein with Felicity Lott, Yann Beuron and François Le Roux; Marc Minkowski (conductor), Virgin Classics, 2005
- Concerto pour violoncelle et orchestre « Concerto militaire » with Jérôme Pernoo; Marc Minkowski (conductor), Archiv Produktion, 2006

as singer

- 'Anne Sofie von Otter sings Offenbach' - Les Musiciens Du Louvre, Marc Minkowski, Deutsche Grammophon, 2002
- 'Magdalena Kožená - French Arias' - Mahler Chamber Orchestra conducted by Marc Minkowski, Deutsche Gramophon, 2003
