= Charles-Louis-Étienne Nuitter =

French librettist, translator, writer and librarian (1828-1899)

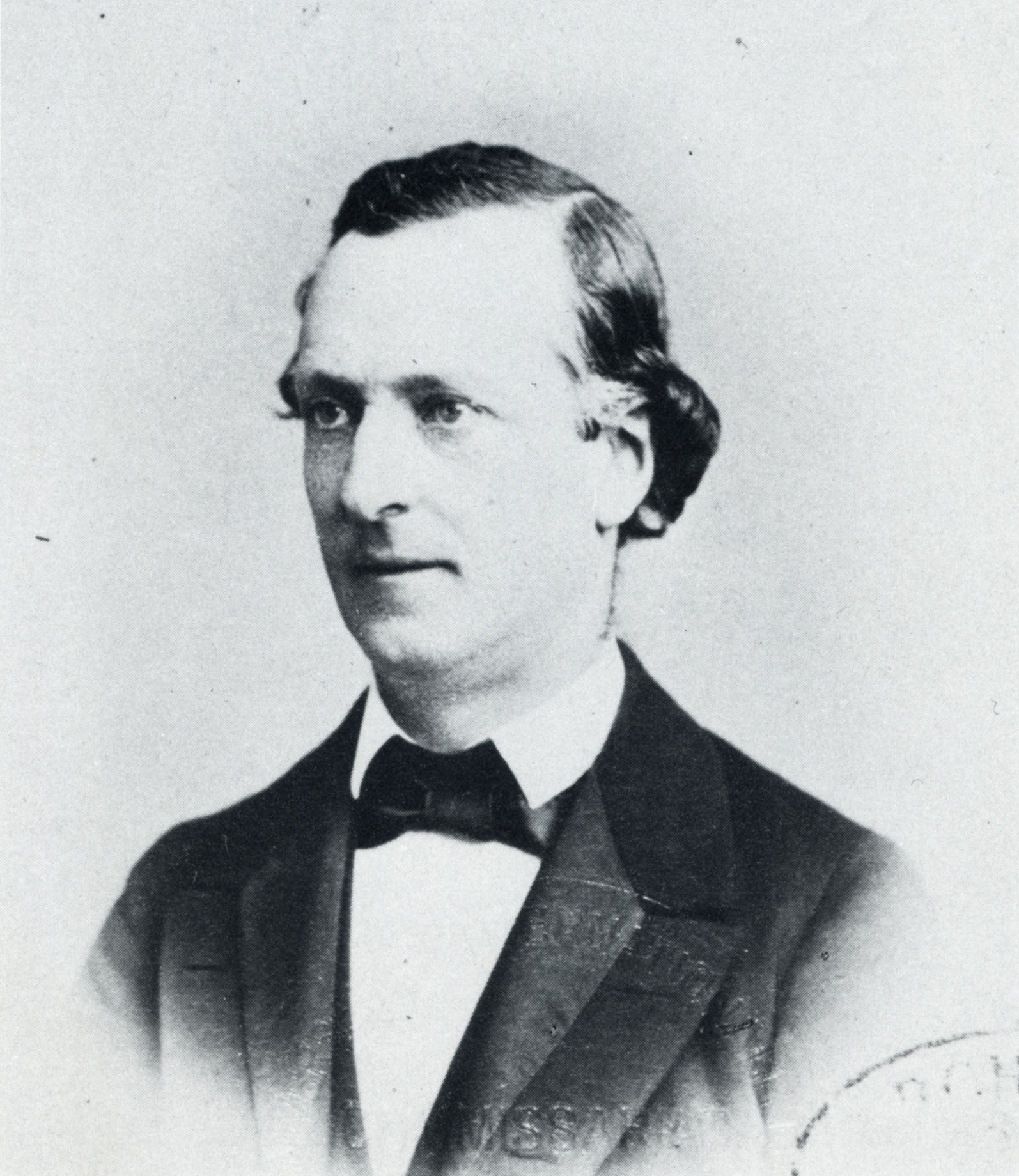
- Born: 24 April 1828; Paris, France
- Died: 23 February 1899 (aged 71); Paris, France
- Occupations: Librettist; translator; librarian; writer

Charles-Louis-Étienne Nuitter was a French librettist, translator, writer and librarian born in Paris, France, on 24 April 1828. He died there on 23 February 1899 after suffering a stroke a few days before.

== Librettist and translator ==
Nuitter studied law and practised in Paris from 1849. He was a keen theatre-goer, and in the 1850s he started writing librettos, mainly vaudevilles, later opéras comique, operas bouffes, operettas and ballets. It is estimated that he wrote or co-authored around 500 theatrical pieces, including libretti for several works by Offenbach, the scenario for Léo Delibes's ballet Coppélia (Nuitter had wanted the piece to be called La poupée de Nuremberg) and pieces by Hervé, Guiraud, Lalo, Lecocq and others, of which 100 or so were staged.

He helped translate Wagner's operas into French (Tannhäuser, 1861, Rienzi, 1869, Lohengrin 1870 and The Flying Dutchman, 1872). Other translations include I Capuleti e i Montecchi, Oberon, Abu Hassan, Die Zauberflöte, and Verdi's Macbeth, Aida, La forza del destino and Simon Boccanegra. Wagner and Verdi esteemed highly the quality of his translations, and he assisted Verdi over the revision of Don Carlos in 1882–83. From a different era, Nuitter's translation of La Prière du matin et du soir by Emilio de' Cavalieri (1600) was performed regularly at the Concerts du Conservatoire during the 1870s–80s and beyond.

== Archivist ==
Becoming involved in the archives of the Paris Opera in 1863, he became official archivist there three years later, and ended his career in law (he had given legal advice to Offenbach in a dispute with the manager of the Théâtre des Bouffes-Parisiens prior to the 1864 premiere of La belle Hélène).

His archival work was extremely important in cataloguing the existing library, rescuing documents from destruction, and acquiring autograph documents and journals (sometimes at his own expense) for the collection. Acquisitions by Nuitter included an important collection of theatre books by Joseph de Filippi and around 900 opera librettos from a former director of the théâtre, Nestor Roqueplan. His influence on the expansion of the archive was impressive. In 1861, there were 350 volumes; by the end of 1862 there were 1,076, and in 1882 the collection had grown to 7,807. He ensured that their importance was taken into account when the Palais Garnier opened in 1875.

== Selected stage works by Nuitter (often in collaboration) ==
- Bavard et Bavarde (1862, Offenbach)
- Il signor Fagotto (1863, Offenbach)
- Les bavards (1863, Offenbach)
- Les fées du Rhin (1864, Offenbach)
- Une fantasia (1865, Hervé)
- La source (1866, Delibes and Minkus – ballet)
- Vert-Vert (1869, Offenbach)
- Coppélia (1870, Delibes – ballet)
- Boule-de-Neige (1871, Offenbach)
- Whittington (1874, Offenbach)
- Maître Péronilla (1878, Offenbach)
- Le coeur et la main (1882, Lecocq)
- Hellé (1896, Duvernoy)
