= Maurice Larrouy =

Maurice Larrouy may refer to:

- Maurice Larrouy (sport shooter) (1872–?), French sport shooter and Olympian
- Maurice Larrouy (writer) (1882–1939), French writer and marine officer
