= André Messager =

French composer and conductor (1853–1929)

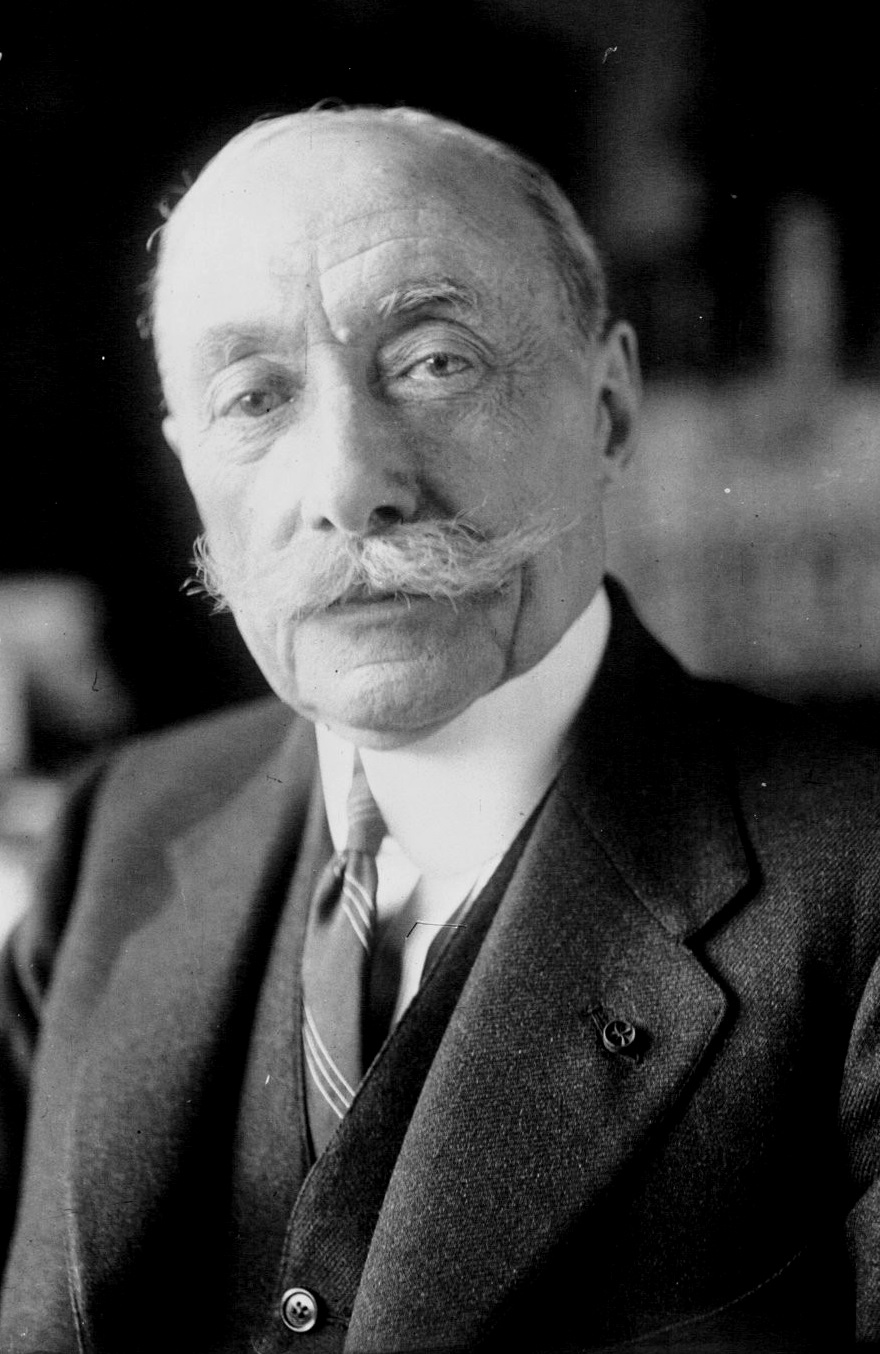
Messager in 1921

André Charles Prosper Messager (French: [mɛsaʒe]; 30 December 1853 – 24 February 1929) was a French composer, organist, pianist and conductor. His compositions include eight ballets and thirty opéras comiques, opérettes and other stage works, among which his ballet Les Deux Pigeons (1886) and opéra comique Véronique (1898) have had lasting success; Les p'tites Michu (1897) and Monsieur Beaucaire (1919) were also popular internationally.

Messager took up the piano as a small child and later studied composition with, among others, Camille Saint-Saëns and Gabriel Fauré. He became a major figure in the musical life of Paris and later London, both as a conductor and a composer. Many of his Parisian works were also produced in the West End and some on Broadway; the most successful had long runs and numerous international revivals. He wrote two operatic works in English, and his later output included musical comedies for Sacha Guitry and Yvonne Printemps.

As a conductor, Messager held prominent positions in Paris and London, at the head of the Opéra-Comique, the Paris Opéra, the Orchestre de la Société des Concerts du Conservatoire, and the Royal Opera House, Covent Garden. Although as a composer he is known chiefly for his light works, as a conductor he presented a wide range of operas, from Mozart to Richard Strauss, and he acquired a reputation as a conductor of Wagner. In Paris he conducted the world premieres of Debussy's Pelléas et Mélisande, Massenet's Grisélidis and Charpentier's Louise. At Covent Garden, he gave the British premieres of operas by Saint-Saëns and Massenet.

Messager's music became known for its melodic and orchestral invention, musical craftsmanship, and characteristically French elegance and grace. Although most of his works have been infrequently revived, historians of music consider him the last major figure in French opéra comique and opérette.

== Life and career ==
=== Early years ===
Four of Messager's musical influences: clockwise from top left, Saint-Saëns; Fauré; Gigout; Chabrier

Messager was born at Montluçon, Allier, in central France on 30 December 1853, the son of Paul-Philippe-Émile Messager, a prosperous local tax collector, and his wife Sophie-Cornélie, née Lhôte de Selancy. He recalled, "You would not find any musicians among my ancestors. When very young I learned the piano; but later on my intentions to become a composer met with such opposition from my father". At the age of seven he was sent as a boarder to a Marist school where he continued his interest in the piano.

Towards the end of the 1860s disastrous stock-market speculation brought Messager's family financial ruin and they could no longer afford to keep him at the Marist school. They dropped their objection to music as a profession, viewing a post as a church organist as a respectable and steady career. He was awarded a bursary to study at the École Niedermeyer in Paris, an academy known for its focus on church music. This was at the time of the Paris Commune uprising (1871), and to escape the violence in the city the school was temporarily evacuated to Switzerland. Messager studied piano with Adam Lausset, organ with Clément Loret, and composition with Eugène Gigout, Gabriel Fauré and (after leaving Niedermeyer's school) Camille Saint-Saëns. The musicologist Jean-Michel Nectoux comments that after his studies Messager developed into one of the finest orchestrators of the period.

Fauré and Messager quickly moved from being master and pupil to being firm friends and occasional collaborators. In 1874 Messager succeeded Fauré as organiste du chœur (choir organist) at Saint-Sulpice, Paris, under the principal organist, Charles-Marie Widor. In 1876 he won the gold medal of the Société des Auteurs, Compositeurs et Editeurs de Musique with a symphony, the work being warmly received when performed by the Concerts Colonne at the Théâtre du Châtelet in January 1878. (Note: Following its good reception the symphony was given several repeat performances soon afterwards.) He won further prizes for his cantatas Don Juan et Haydée and Prométhée enchaîné.

In 1879 Fauré and Messager travelled to Cologne to see Wagner's Das Rheingold and Die Walküre, and later to Munich for the complete Ring cycle, Die Meistersinger von Nürnberg and Tannhäuser; in 1888 they went to Bayreuth for Die Meistersinger and Parsifal. They frequently performed as a party piece their joint composition, the irreverent Souvenirs de Bayreuth (c. 1888). (Note: The date is Nectoux's estimate. Wagstaff and Lamb in Grove put the date earlier, possibly 1880. The work was not published during either composer's lifetime. It was first published in 1930 by Costallat et Cie, Paris (OCLC 317674216).) This short, skittish piano work for four hands burlesques motifs from The Ring. The two composers had a more serious collaboration, their Messe des pêcheurs de Villerville (1881).

=== First successes ===
Poster for François les bas-bleus, 1883. The names of both the composers are in small print just below the title.

In 1878 Messager was appointed conductor at the Folies Bergère, and he began his career composing for the stage with two short ballets, Fleur d'oranger (1878) and Les Vins de France (1879). In 1880 a former manager of the Folies, M. Comy, was appointed to run the new Eden Théâtre in Brussels. At his invitation, Messager resigned from the Folies in 1880 and became conductor of the Eden. He returned to Paris in 1881 as organist of Saint-Paul-Saint-Louis church, and from 1882 to 1884 he was organist and choirmaster at Ste Marie-des-Batignolles, a small church in the north west of Paris, where his assistant was another young composer, Claude Terrasse.

Messager's career took a new turn in 1883 when the composer Firmin Bernicat died leaving an unfinished opérette, François les bas-bleus. Messager was invited to complete it; he orchestrated the entire work and composed between twelve and fifteen numbers. It was staged in November 1883 at the Théâtre des Folies-Dramatiques and was an immediate critical and popular success. It was later produced in London and New York. In 1883, while deputising for Saint-Saëns as the soloist at a concert in Le Havre, Messager met a young woman, Edith Clouette, whom he married in the same year. Fauré played the organ at the ceremony, (Note: As bride and bridegroom processed solemnly down the aisle Fauré mischievously included in his improvisation a tune from one of Messager's Folies Bergère ballets.) and composed a mildly cynical song, "Madrigal", as a wedding present. There was one child of the marriage, Jean André Emile Charles (1886–1952).

In December 1883 Messager and Emmanuel Chabrier gave the first performance of the latter's Trois valses romantiques at the Société Nationale de Musique. The concert also included the premiere of the two-piano version of España, arranged by Messager. Messager and Chabrier were close friends until the latter's death in 1894. Both were known for their comic operas and opérettes, but Chabrier's one serious opera, Gwendoline, appealed strongly to Messager, who vowed to conduct it in Paris, which he later did. (Note: Messager's first Paris performance of Gwendoline was on 12 May 1911.) He also prepared a piano reduction of the orchestral parts for the vocal score of the work. (Note: The score was published in 1890 in Paris by Enoch frères and Costallat; and in Brunswick by Henry Litolffs Verlag.)

Following the success of François les bas-bleus Messager accepted simultaneous invitations to compose a ballet for the Opéra and an opérette for the Folies-Dramatiques. The opérette, La Fauvette du temple, first performed on 17 November 1885, confirmed Messager's early reputation. It ran well into the following year in Paris, and he was able to sell the British rights immediately, though the work was not staged in London until 1891. The ballet, Les Deux Pigeons, which became one of Messager's best known works, took longer to reach the stage. It was put into rehearsal at the Opéra, but the staging, which showed a tree being struck by lightning in a storm scene, was considered a fire hazard by the police, and the production was temporarily shelved.

A month after the opening of La Fauvette du temple the Bouffes-Parisiens premiered Messager's opéra comique La Béarnaise, with Jeanne Granier in the title role. It ran for three months and was successfully produced in Britain the following year with a cast including Florence St. John and Marie Tempest, running for more than 200 performances. The Times said of this production that it gave Messager a secure footing in London, which led to important results later in his career. A production of La Béarnaise in New York followed in 1887, under the title Jacquette.

In 1886 Les Deux Pigeons was finally produced at the Paris Opéra and was a box office triumph. It was Messager's last popular success for four years. His attempt at a more serious opera, Le Bourgeois de Calais (1888), was not well received. Richard Traubner remarks in Operetta: A Theatrical History on its "boring historical plot, bad lyrics, and a banal score"; a contemporary critic wrote, "That Le Bourgeois de Calais will have a successful career there is not the faintest chance, for all the patriotic bolstering in the world could not make it an attractive piece." Messager followed this with a musical fairy tale, Isoline (1888), which was slightly better received, and a three-act opérette, Le Mari de la reine (1889), which failed, although Messager thought it "the best of my flops".

=== Fin de siècle ===
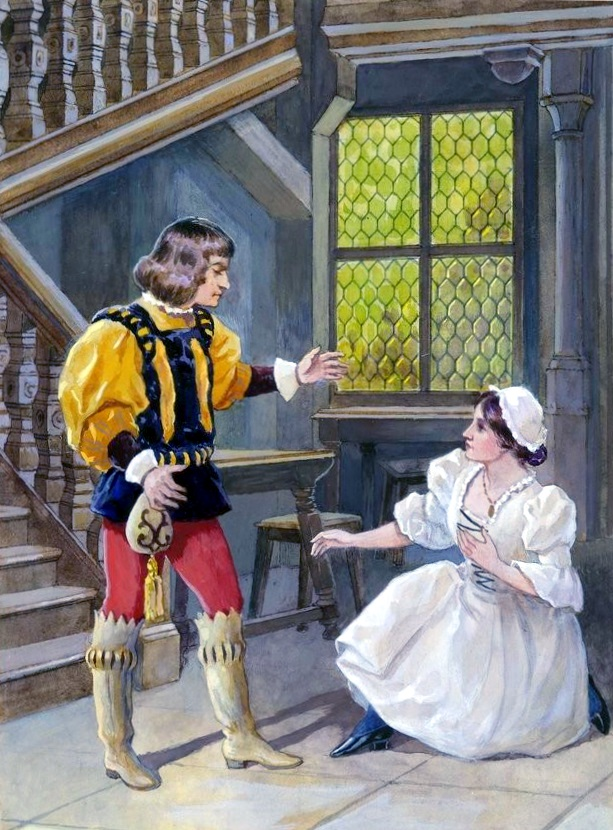
Scene from La Basoche, 1890

Messager's fortunes revived in 1890 with La Basoche, produced with much success at the Opéra-Comique. The critic who had pronounced so unfavourably on Le Bourgeois de Calais wrote of the new piece, "an exceptionally pleasing work ... a dainty piece which cannot fail to obtain widespread popularity." An English-language version was produced in London in 1891 by Richard D'Oyly Carte. The theatrical newspaper The Era said, "The Basoche is more than a success; it is a triumph", but the piece had only a modest London run of three months. (Note: Both the anonymous critic in The Era and Bernard Shaw in The World condemned the British public for its failure to support the piece.) A New York production was given in 1893 but was not a success.

Messager was a dandy and a philanderer. The musical historian D. Kern Holoman describes him as "given to immaculately tailored suits emphasizing his thin frame, careful grooming with particular attention to his mustaches, fine jewelry, and spats ... a witty conversationalist with an inexhaustible store of anecdotes and bons mots" and a womaniser. In the early 1890s Edith Messager, tired of her husband's infidelities, divorced him. Shortly afterwards she became ill; her condition deteriorated, and Messager visited her daily. By the time of her death in 1892 the two had become close again, and Messager felt her loss deeply.

In 1892 Messager's career as a conductor began to advance when he was invited to conduct Die Walküre at Marseille. As a composer the early 1890s brought him mixed fortunes. Madame Chrysanthème, staged at the Théâtre de la Renaissance in 1893, was a setting of Pierre Loti's story of a betrayed geisha, a theme that later inspired Puccini's Madama Butterfly; it was politely rather than enthusiastically received. Mirette, produced by Carte at the Savoy Theatre in 1894, was Messager's first opera written expressly for the London stage and was the only original Savoy opera by a French composer. To assist him in what was for him (at the time) an unfamiliar idiom, Messager enlisted the help of the songwriter Dotie (Alice Maude) Davis (1859–1938), known professionally as Hope Temple. She became Messager's second wife in 1895. According to Bernard Shaw, Messager, concluding from the reception of La Basoche in London that it was unwise to offer the British public anything too intelligent, decided that the new opera was going to be as commonplace as possible. It ran for 41 performances, was withdrawn and revised, and then ran for another 61 performances. Messager vetoed any production in Paris. His next opera, a serious work, Le Chevalier d'Harmental (1896), was unsuccessful, and for a while he and his new wife withdrew to the English countryside near Maidenhead, Berkshire.

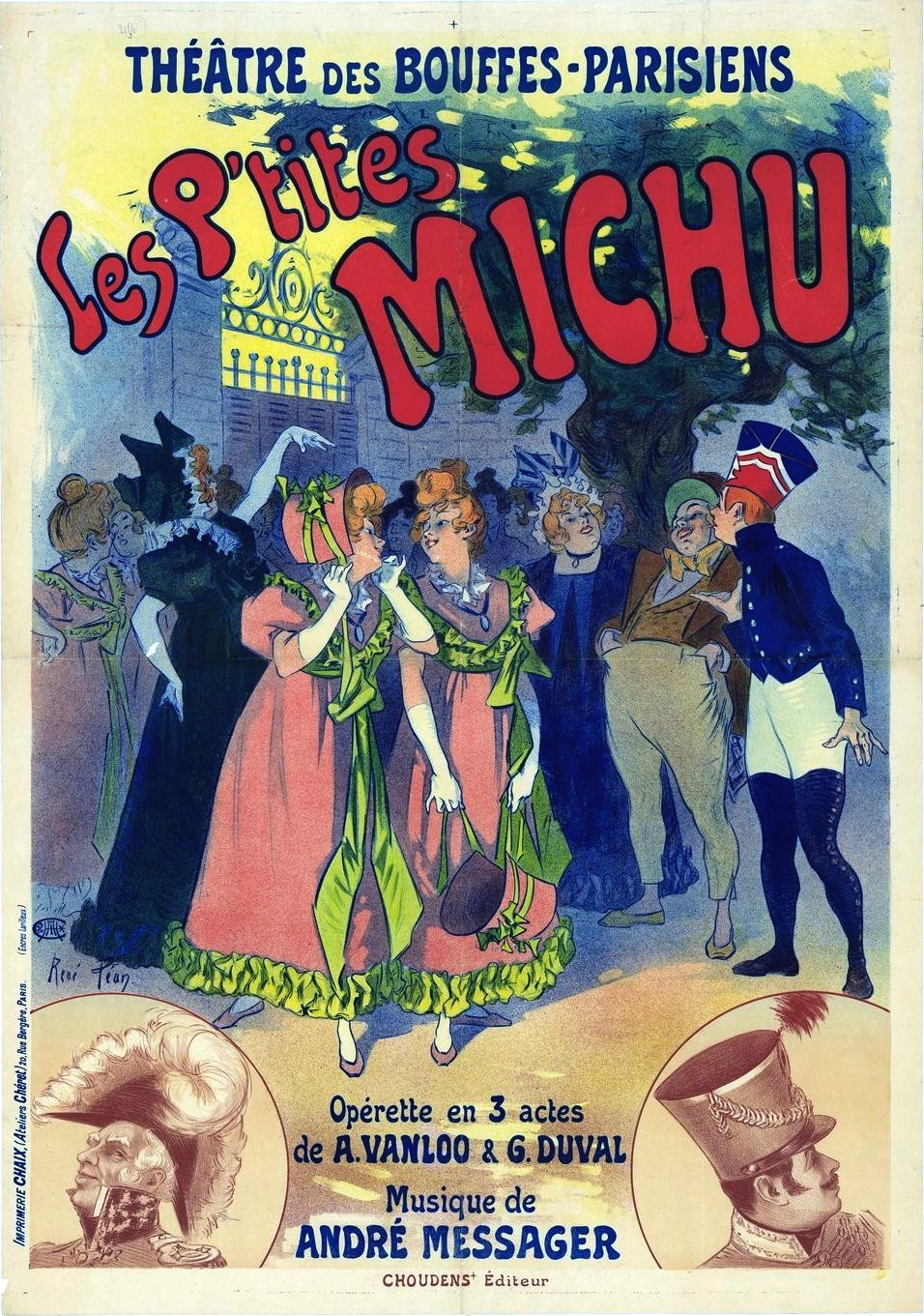
Poster for Les P'tites Michu, 1897

From 1897 Messager's career revived. He later recalled that he had received by post an unsolicited libretto:

I was attracted by the gaiety of its subject, and putting aside my dark thoughts, I set to work on it with such enthusiasm that the work was completed in three months, and performed in the same year at the Bouffes, with great success. I have since found out that the libretto had been turned down by two or three composers.

This was the opérette Les P'tites Michu, which was presented to great acclaim at the Bouffes-Parisiens. Its 1905 English adaptation in London ran for 401 performances. Soon afterwards he was appointed musical director of the Opéra-Comique, and in the commercial theatre had another outstanding success with Véronique (1898).

In 1898 Messager's only child from his second marriage, Madeleine Hope Andrée (d. 1986) was born. From that year to 1904 Messager's work at the Opéra-Comique left him little time for composition, particularly after 1901, when he also spent May to July at the Royal Opera House in London. He turned down W. S. Gilbert's offer of a collaboration, and wrote only two stage works between 1898 and 1914. His international fame as a composer nevertheless grew, with productions of Les P'tites Michu and Véronique in countries including Britain, Spain, Switzerland, Germany and the US. Unusually for the London stage at the time, Véronique was given in French in 1903. An English translation was staged the following year and ran for 496 performances. (Note: Such was the success of Véronique in London that the chef-proprietor of the Carlton Hotel, Auguste Escoffier, created the dish Sole Véronique in its honour. He had a record of inventing dishes with an operatic connexion, having created pêche Melba a decade earlier. He published the recipes for both in his Guide to Modern Cookery (1907).) Messager conducted the first nights of both productions. The English version was staged in New York the following year, running for 81 performances.

=== Twentieth century ===
At the Opéra-Comique, Messager conducted the premieres of Massenet's Grisélidis and Charpentier's Louise, and gave the first French performances of operas as contrasted as Hansel and Gretel and Tosca. But by far the best known of his premieres was Debussy's Pelléas et Mélisande (1902). Messager encouraged the composer to complete the opera and worked closely with him in getting the orchestration ready for the premiere. In gratitude Debussy dedicated the work to Messager. Holoman writes, "his championing of Pelléas et Mélisande alone would have earned him a place in music history." Debussy regarded Messager as the ideal conductor. Before the premiere he had trusted him to "make his dream into a reality"; after it he praised him for knowing "how to awaken the inner sound world of Pelléas with tender delicacy". After Messager's commitments obliged him to leave Paris for London, Debussy found the performances much less satisfactory. As a conductor, Messager won praise on both sides of the English Channel. The English music critic Francis Toye wrote that, good though Arturo Toscanini's conducting of Pelléas et Mélisande was at La Scala in Milan, Messager's was still better. The Parisian critic Pierre Lalo said of Messager:

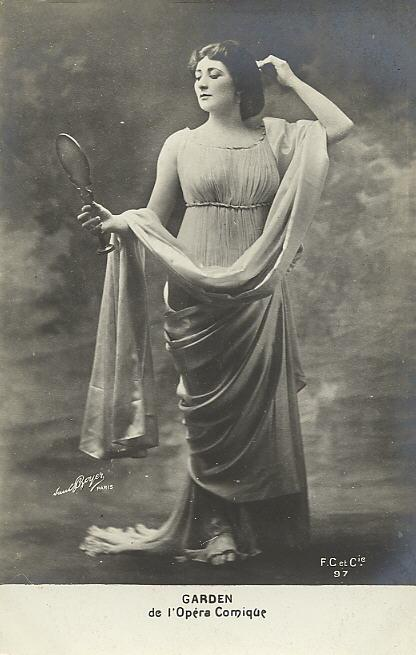
Mary Garden in Thaïs, c. 1902

He was an incomparable conductor of Pelléas – perfect and complete. With him, nothing was missing from this work of Debussy, with extreme refinement and lightness at the same time, and the most penetrating and delicate poetry, all the necessary emphasis, all the accents right and fine, and never anything hard or exaggerated – truly a marvel.

From 1901 to 1907 Messager was one of the directors of the Grand Opera Syndicate, which ran the annual seasons at the Royal Opera House, Covent Garden, featuring the leading singers of the day, including Nellie Melba and Enrico Caruso. Much of his time was spent on administration, and he had limited scope for conducting. From 1901, for two years, Messager had an affair with the Scottish soprano Mary Garden, whom he met at the Opéra-Comique and conducted when she took over the title role of Louise. She also appeared in a revival of his Madame Chrysanthème. His first appearance as a conductor at Covent Garden was in 1902 for the first performance of Princess Osra by Herbert Bunning. He next conducted there in 1904 in the British premiere of Saint-Saëns's Hélène, followed in 1905 by Carmen, Don Giovanni, Faust, the world première of Franco Leoni's L'oracolo, Orphée et Euridice and Roméo et Juliette; in his final year, 1906, he conducted Armide, Carmen, Don Giovanni, Faust, the British premiere of Le Jongleur de Notre-Dame, and Roméo et Juliette. In 1906 he also introduced to Covent Garden his ballet Les Deux Pigeons. Despite his reputation as a Wagnerian, he yielded the baton for Wagner performances to Hans Richter, widely regarded as the world's foremost exponent of Wagner's music. In 1906 Messager and the London Symphony Orchestra travelled to Paris to play a programme of English music at the Châtelet Theatre, including works by Sullivan, Parry and Stanford. (Note: Messager was not responsible for the choice of repertoire, which an Anglophile critic in a Paris paper felt had put the cause of English music in France back by fifty years.) When he left Covent Garden in 1907, the directors found it necessary to appoint two people to fill his place: Neil Forsyth as general manager and Percy Pitt as musical director.

1904 production of Véronique

In 1907 Messager returned to composition. His "comédie lyrique" Fortunio was presented at the Opéra-Comique with great success. In the same year he was appointed joint director of the Paris Opéra, responsible for the artistic direction, with Frederick Broussan, formerly director of the Lyons Opera, taking charge of administration. (Note: A comment by the recently retired president of the French Republic, Émile Loubet, was much repeated in Paris: "What a pity Messager has been appointed manager of the Opéra. He will have no time to write good music and will probably write bad.") The partnership lasted until 1913, but its success was hampered by shortage of funds and internal disputes. Messager decided on a policy of making the Opéra "more genuinely French". He revived Rameau's Hippolyte et Aricie, for the first time in Paris since 1767, and presented unusual French repertoire including Fauré's Pénélope. Foreign opera was not neglected; Messager gave Paris its first complete Ring cycle, (Note: The Ring cycle presented by Messager was given three times; Artur Nikisch conducted the first cycle, Messager the second, and Felix Mottl the third.) presented a Russian season starring Félia Litvinne and Feodor Chaliapin, and conducted the French premiere of Richard Strauss's Salome. At the invitation of the Emperor Wilhelm II, Messager and Broussan took the Opéra company to Berlin in 1908. Relations between the two co-directors were not always harmonious; after the French government refused Messager's resignation on at least one occasion, he finally announced it in November 1913, a year before his term of office was due to expire. He consented to return in January 1914 to conduct Parsifal – its first performance in Europe outside Bayreuth. His conducting of the work won critical praise.

On the strength of his experience as a Wagnerian, Messager was appointed conductor of the Orchestre de la Société des Concerts du Conservatoire in 1908. It was at the time, and for many years, the most prestigious symphony orchestra in France, and Messager was determined that it should enjoy the international prestige of the Vienna and Berlin Philharmonic Orchestras. Alongside the main orchestral repertoire of Haydn, Mozart, Beethoven, Liszt and French classics, Messager conducted major choral works by J. S. Bach, Handel, Schumann and Berlioz, as well as introducing early French music such as that of Janequin. In the 1913–14 season, he conducted a chronological cycle of Beethoven's symphonies and his Missa solemnis, as well as Verdi's Requiem, for the Italian composer's centenary. Messager took the orchestra outside Paris to Lille, Lyon and Antwerp during these years. During the First World War he took the orchestra on tour to Argentina (1916), Switzerland (1917), and the US and Canada (1918–19), giving concerts in more than 50 cities. After their concert at the Metropolitan Opera House in October 1918, the orchestra and Messager received a prolonged ovation that was typical of their reception as the tour progressed. At the end of that tour Messager retired from his post.

Messager was criticised for performing the music of Wagner during the war, but he maintained that German music represented the noble side of the enemy nation's nature. Like Fauré, Messager refused to have anything to do with the National League for the Defence of French Music (La Ligue Nationale pour la Defense de la Musique Française), led by Saint-Saëns, which sought to boycott German music. (Note: Messager and Fauré both thought that their friend and former teacher was making himself look foolish over the matter. Messager wrote to Fauré, "How ridiculous our poor Camille is, with his need to be polemical and say such stupid things.")

In 1914 Messager composed Béatrice, described as a "légende lyrique", based on the 1911 play The Miracle. The premiere was in Monte Carlo. (Note: Grove states that the premiere was moved to Monte Carlo from Paris at the outbreak of war. In fact, the premiere in Monte Carlo was on 21 March, several months before the war began.) The work was performed in Paris in 1917 but was not successful. In 1915 Messager joined with other musicians in contributing compositions to King Albert's Book to raise money for "the relief of the suffering Belgian people"; the other composers included Debussy, Elgar, Mascagni and Saint-Saëns.

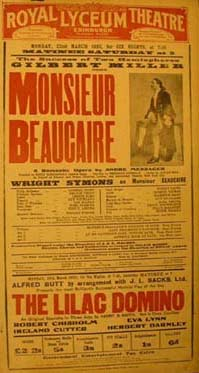
Playbill from a 1920 production

In 1919 Messager's operetta Monsieur Beaucaire was premiered in Birmingham prior to a long run in the West End. The composer, who generally conducted British premieres of his works, was suffering from sciatica and could not even be in the audience for the first nights in either city. The work received its Paris premiere at the Théâtre Marigny in 1925, and it ran for 143 performances on Broadway. Later in 1919 Messager resumed the musical directorship of the Opéra-Comique for the 1919–20 season, conducting among other works the first complete performance in France of Così fan tutte.

=== Last years ===
In the 1920s, Messager kept pace with the change in fashion in musical theatre, consciously absorbing the styles of musical comedy, lightening his orchestration, but maintaining a Gallic flavour, mostly avoiding American dance-rhythm influences. He collaborated with Sacha Guitry on the musical comedies L'Amour masqué (1923) and Deburau (1926), starring Yvonne Printemps. The former was a considerable success in Paris, but in London the official censor, the Lord Chamberlain, declared it "unfit for the English public", and banned C. B. Cochran's planned production starring Printemps and Guitry. In Messager's late stage works his lighter touch was balanced by echoes of the nineteenth century, with hints of Fauré and, particularly, Chabrier's L'Étoile. Fauré, by 1923 too frail and deaf to go to the theatre, was lent a copy of the score of L'Amour masqué and wrote to Messager, "Your wit is the same as always – it never grows old – and so are your charm and very personal brand of music that always remains exquisite even amid the broadest clowning". Fauré died the following year, and Messager dedicated the music of Deburau to his memory.

In 1924 Sergei Diaghilev persuaded Messager to conduct the Paris premieres of Auric's ballet Les Fâcheux and Poulenc's Les Biches. In 1928 Messager played a key role in establishing important updates to copyright law, though he was on the losing side of the case. He sued the BBC for breach of copyright for broadcasting his works without his consent. He lost because he had assigned his British performing rights to George Edwardes, whose estate had given the BBC permission for the broadcast. The case established that as the broadcasting rights had not been specifically reserved, the Edwardes estate's rights included them.

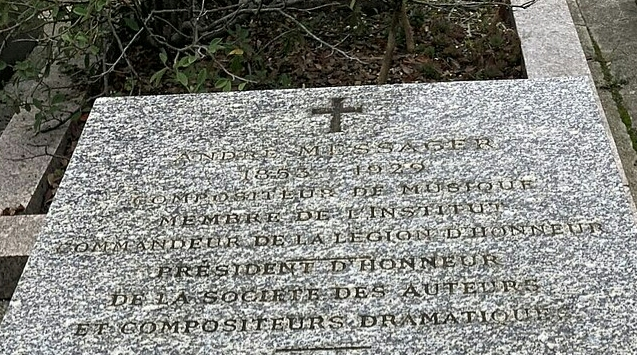
Messager's grave in Passy Cemetery

After a short illness Messager died in Paris on 24 February 1929 aged 75. He was interred in the Passy Cemetery near the graves of Debussy and Fauré. His last completed work, the opérette Coups de roulis, was running in Paris when he died. (Note: At his death, Messager left some numbers for an unfinished work, Sacha, to a libretto by Maurice Donnay, André Rivoire and Léon Guillot de Saix. He had composed about a quarter of the score, which was completed by Marc Berthomieu. It was staged at the Théâtre Garnier, Monte Carlo in December 1933.) A contemporary critic commented, "Its tuneful melodies show that the veteran composer had lost nothing of the qualities that made Véronique such a success. Throughout his life Messager remained without a peer as a composer of light music."

=== Honours and awards ===
Messager was elected President of the Société des Auteurs et Compositeurs Dramatiques in 1926, the first composer to hold this office. In the same year he was elected to the Académie des Beaux-Arts. In 1927 he was appointed Commander of the Légion d'honneur. In his native town of Montluçon, the music academy, opened in 2009, is named in his honour. In 2003, to mark the 150th anniversary of his birth, Messager was the subject of a large exhibition at the Musée des musiques populaires de Montluçon, recounting his biography and illustrating his works in the various genres. Among the comité d'honneur of the exhibition were the composer's three grandchildren, and the singers Susan Graham, Dame Felicity Lott and Mady Mesplé, the conductors Sir John Eliot Gardiner, John Nelson and Michel Plasson, and the director Jérôme Savary.

== Music ==
Staff and students of the École Niedermeyer, 1871. Messager is in the middle row, second from right; his teachers Fauré and Gigout are in the front row, second from left and furthest right, respectively.

In his 1991 study of Messager, John Wagstaff writes that the composer's music is notable for its fine orchestration, easy-flowing melody, and skilfully written music, dance-like in character. Unlike his teacher Fauré, Messager enjoyed orchestrating. He said that musical ideas came to him "already clothed in the appropriate instrumental shades", and after the concentrated effort of composing his scores he found it relaxing to work on "the handling of instruments, the balancing of different sonorities, the grouping of colours and the structuring of effects". He remarked that composers who had their music orchestrated by assistants presumably did not care if their helpers lacked "that indefinable sixth sense which would indicate the right combination of sonorities to carry out the original intentions of the composer". To Messager, passages often depended for their significance or flavour on the orchestral writing alone.

Gervase Hughes, in a study of French opérette, comments that Messager's only technical defect was "one all too common to many composers of operetta – too close an adherence to repetitive rhythmic figures and four-bar rigidity", although such was Messager's "innate artistry that criticism on that score would be academic pedantry". One of the composer's distinguishing characteristics was a liking for chromaticism; this appealed to a younger generation of composers. His "Eh que ne parliez-vous?", from La Basoche, was quoted note-for-note by Poulenc in Les Mamelles de Tirésias. Although Messager greatly admired Wagner, and was a celebrated conductor of his music, he distanced himself from Wagnerian influences in his own compositions. In Madame Chrysanthème he made use of leitmotifs, and included other references to Wagner, but such examples are rare in his works.

Unlike some older contemporaries such as Saint-Saëns and Massenet, Messager remained open to new ideas and idioms throughout his life, and his style evolved to match the spirit of the times. His biographer and former pupil Henry Février commented that from classic opéras comiques, such as La Basoche, Messager's later works, such as Les P'tites Michu and Véronique, show a difference in style, "bringing an altogether fresher approach to the genre." Towards the end of his career Messager successfully moved to "comédie musicale", the French form of musical comedy.

Ballets apart, Messager composed thirty works for the stage; they fall into several different, or sometimes overlapping, genres; the most numerous are opéras comiques (9), opérettes (7) and comédies musicales (3). (Note: There is no universally agreed dividing line between opéra comique and opérette; a 2003 study of opera suggests that the latter is essentially frivolous, and the former, though often (but not always) humorous, also has some element of genuine human interest and is seen as of loftier artistic intent. Others disagree that opérette is "essentially" frivolous.) The composer remarked late in his career:

I have never intended to write what is nowadays called "opérette". This designation – which all too often has pejorative overtones – seems to have become common since the work of Lecocq. Many of my works ... were only called operéttes at the request of theatre directors who saw in that term some extra chance of success. Neither did I wish to compose opéra-bouffes, the best examples of which were provided by the works of Offenbach, where the element of parody is very dominant. My idea was always to continue the tradition of French opéra-comique (with dialogue) as established by Dalayrac, Boieldieu and Auber.

=== Early stage works ===
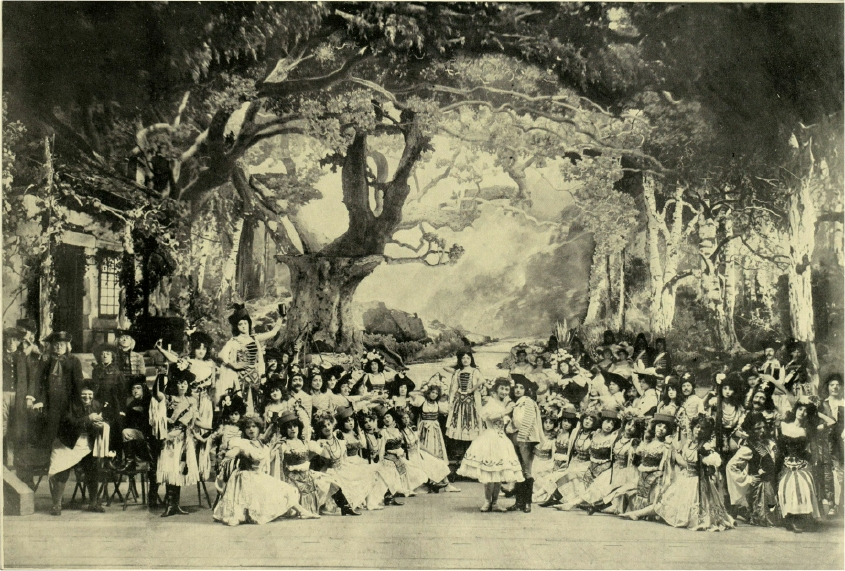
Les Deux Pigeons – final tableau

Although Messager called some of his early stage works opéras comiques they have, Gervase Hughes suggests, more in common with opérette than their composer acknowledged. Nevertheless, Messager introduced adventurous modern harmonic details in his early pieces, and strove to raise the artistic standards of opérette to that of opéra comique while retaining the essential panache of the genre. Hughes finds the first stage works uneven in quality but La Fauvette du temple (1884) to contain two fine expressive duets as well as waltzes and polkas with "an Offenbach lilt". Hughes judges the next two scores, La Béarnaise and La Fauvette (both 1885), less satisfying but nonetheless at least as good as anything by Messager's older contemporaries Planquette, Serpette and Lecocq.

Wagstaff writes that the composer's most enduring work is the ballet score Les Deux Pigeons (1886). The piece is based on the fable The Two Pigeons by Jean de La Fontaine. The music is best known in the five-movement suite arranged from the full score, which includes the "Entrée de tziganes". Messager revived the ballet in 1906 in London and in 1912 in Paris in a shortened, two-act version. In 1961 John Lanchbery revised this for Frederick Ashton's new version of the ballet, with a closing reconciliation scene from earlier music and a passage transcribed from Véronique. This was first given at Covent Garden, is revived regularly by the Royal Ballet and has been staged by such other companies as CAPAB and Australian Ballet.

Isoline (1888), a musical fairy story ("conte des fées"), is neither an opérette nor an opéra comique. Writing in 1908, Fauré called it "one of the most poetic, most expressive works that have been written in France in the last twenty years", but it made little impact. The score remained in obscurity until 1930 when Reynaldo Hahn staged the ballet section of the work at Cannes. The whole piece was revived at the Opéra-Comique in 1958; it failed again, but the ballet, unencumbered by the portentousness of the libretto, which weighs down the rest of the piece, has remained in the repertory. (Note: In the discography section of his book on Messager, Wagstaff lists 13 recordings of the ballet music.)

=== 1890s stage works ===
Scene from La Basoche

The decade began well for Messager with the artistic and commercial success of La Basoche (1890). Février in his André Messager: Mon Maître, Mon Ami calls it "the last of the great nineteenth-century French comic operas" ("le dernier des grands opéras-comique français du XIX siècle") and considers it of the greatest importance not only in Messager's career but in the history of French musical theatre. Hughes says it has a good claim to be the composer's masterpiece. The musicologist James Harding rates it "the best Messager had written to date ... one of his finest works". When the work was given in London, a year after its Parisian premiere, the reviewer in The Times called it, "A work of great beauty and charm", although "the influence of Die Meistersinger is felt to an extent that is almost absurd both in the bright overture and again in the procession of the guild, but elsewhere the music is as original as it is charming".

With Madame Chrysanthème (1893), a four-act "lyric comedy" with no spoken dialogue, Messager reached a turning point in his development. The crux of the plot was the same as that later used by Puccini for Madama Butterfly (1904): a young Japanese geisha wooed and then abandoned by a foreign sailor. Messager's treatment of the story was praised for its sensitivity – reviewers in the Parisian press applauded him for raising opérette to the level of "comédie lyrique" – but he was a self-critical artist, and he felt he had strayed too far in the direction of opera and away from his chosen genre. Harding suggests that the unusual seriousness of the score may be connected with the recent illness and death of Edith Messager. Both Hughes and Harding comment that Messager's score is subtler than Puccini's, (Note: Reviewing Madama Butterfly at the Opéra-Comique in December 1908, Fauré, whose view of Puccini's music was less favourable than it later became, made a plea for a revival of Madame Chrysanthème.) but add that the almost total eclipse of Madame Chrysanthème by Madama Butterfly may be partly due to the relative effectiveness of their libretti. (Note: Messager's librettists (Georges Hartmann and Alexandre André) stuck closely to Loti's original with external local colour, whereas Puccini's, based on David Belasco's stage play on the theme, added considerable extra incident to the mainly uneventful story, focusing on the private drama.) After this, Messager consciously simplified his style, greatly reducing the harmonic subtleties that had been characteristic of his earlier works.

The works from the middle of the decade were unsuccessful financially and artistically. Le Chevalier d'Harmental (1896), classed by Hughes as Messager's first true opéra comique ("in a somewhat pretentious style") was a failure, and an unpretentious opérette in the same year, La Fiancée en loterie, fared no better. After these disappointments Messager finished the 1890s with two considerable successes. Traubner describes Les P'tites Michu (1897) as "a sensational hit", and Harding calls it the best of Messager's opérettes so far (classing Le Basoche as opéra comique, as did its composer). The plot was not strikingly original: critics commented that its story of babies switched at birth was already very familiar from Gilbert and Sullivan operas. (Note: The device was a key plot point in H.M.S. Pinafore (1878) and The Gondoliers (1889). A similar plot device had earlier been used by Offenbach in L'île de Tulipatan (1868).) Traubner describes the piece as "one of those unusual works that begin well enough and gets better and better". Setting a scene in the market of Les Halles was not innovative, but Messager's chorus for the marchands and marchandes was out of the ordinary, and Traubner also singles out the duet for the Michus in Act 1: "clever, lilting ... pulsating with an elegance and grace that other operetta composers have failed to obtain". He also judges the finales as outstanding, including a waltz number that in other hands would be predictable but is turned by Messager into something much more symphonic.

The final work from the decade was Véronique. Messager described it as an opéra comique, but commentators have classed it as a mixture of opérette and opéra comique. The score contains two of the composer's best known numbers, the "Swing duet" ("Poussez, poussez l'escarpolette") and the "Donkey duet" ("De ci, de la"). When the work was revived at the Proms in London in the 1960s, the music critic of The Times commented, "Charming as it can prove in the theatre, the music alone is a little thin, with none of the piquancy that – thanks perhaps to Gilbert – redeems Messager's famous English contemporary Sullivan ... but Véronique has plenty of pretty things". It became and has remained the composer's most performed musical theatre piece.

=== 20th century ===
Marion Green and Maggie Teyte in Monsieur Beaucaire, 1919

Messager's work running opera houses in Paris and London limited his composing between Véronique and the period after the First World War. Fortunio (1907) was a rare example in his oeuvre of a sung-through opera. Eight decades later the critic Edward Greenfield described it as "a long-buried jewel of a piece ... an improbable cross between musical comedy and Tristan und Isolde". (Note: Unlike many of Messager's stage works, Fortunio was not seen in London shortly after the Parisian premiere: it was not given in Britain until 2001, when it was greeted as "an adorable blend of romanticism and Gallic cynicism" by The Sunday Telegraph, "a little-known delight" by The Times, "pure joy" by The Independent and "tosh of the highest order" by The Observer.) From 1919 onwards Messager composed no more opéras comiques. Among his post-war stage works, Monsieur Beaucaire, a "romantic operetta" (1919), was his second work to an English libretto. French critics were inclined to look down on "Messager's English operetta" as over-sweet and sentimental to suit Anglo-Saxon tastes. Harding comments that the composer was successful in his attempt to produce an English flavour: one number is "pure Edward German" and there is much pastiche throughout the score. Despite the critics the piece ran well not only in Britain and the US, but also in France, with more than 300 performances in Paris and a long life in French provincial theatres.

Of Messager's 1920s comédies musicales the best known is L'Amour masqué (1923). The Théâtre Édouard VII where it was premiered had a small orchestra pit, and Messager developed a new style of orchestration to deliver his desired musical effects with a small number of players. Harding comments that the piece was up-to-date enough to include a tango, "a beautifully written example with luscious harmonies that by contrast show up the threadbare nature of most other efforts of the time".

=== Non-stage works and role in French music ===
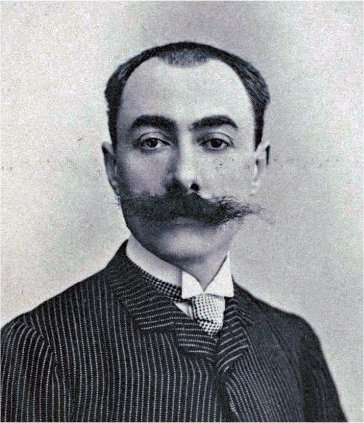
Messager in 1890

Messager wrote songs for solo voice with piano throughout his career. Like Fauré, he was fond of the poetry of Armand Sylvestre, and from "La Chanson des cerises" in 1882 to the cycle Amour d'hiver in 1911 he set thirteen of Sylvestre's poems. Others whose verse he set ranged widely, from Victor Hugo to Frederic Weatherly (author of among other things "Danny Boy").

In his old age Messager said that he would have liked to write more concert works, but had never had the opportunity. The Symphony in A, written when he was 22, is on the normal classical plan with sonata form in the first and last movements, a songlike theme in the adagio and a scherzo third movement. Looking back he described it as "très classique". In notes to a 1992 recording of the piece, Xavier Deletang comments that although the influence of Mendelssohn and possibly Schumann may be discernible, the work reveals a mastery of instrumentation and a quintessentially French flavour, particularly in the wind parts. The two main subjects of the Allegro con moto first movement are strongly contrasted, with the opening string theme followed by a chorale-like theme for the winds.

When Messager was elected to membership of the Académie des Beaux-Arts in 1926 the influential musical journal Le Ménestrel remarked that this conferred on his chosen genre – opérette – official status and recognition; but his fame as a composer of light music has tended to obscure his considerable standing in contemporary serious musical circles. It was said of him that he had "seen all, heard all, and remembered all". The leading composers of the time valued his friendship and advice. Fauré called him "familiar with everything, knowing it all, fascinated by anything new". Messager's younger colleague, the composer Reynaldo Hahn, wrote, "I do believe that no musician has ever loved music as much as André Messager did. In any case, it would be impossible to have a greater musical curiosity than he did, up to the end of his life, too." Like Fauré, Messager wrote musical criticism for Le Figaro and other publications in the first decades of the 20th century. Unlike Fauré, who was known for his kindly reviews, Messager was frequently severe. His views carried weight: some of his criticisms were reported in the international press.

In 1908 Fauré wrote of Messager, "There are not many examples in the history of music of an artist with such a complete education, of such profound knowledge, who consents to apply his gifts to forms regarded, nobody knows why, as secondary". Baker's Biographical Dictionary of Musicians says of Messager, "His style may be described as enlightened eclecticism; his music was characteristically French, and more specifically Parisian, in its elegance and gaiety." In his book Composers of Operetta, Hughes comments that Messager combined "a flow of spontaneous melody worthy of Offenbach with a flair for economic workmanship at least the equal of Lecocq's" and in much of his music "a measure of Massenet's fluent grace, Saint-Saëns's aristocratic elegance, even Fauré's refined subtlety". He observes that Messager spanned an entire era: "Auber, Rossini and Meyerbeer were still alive when he began his studies, yet he survived the First World War and witnessed the rise and decline of "les Six". ... For forty years he carried aloft the torch kindled by Adolphe Adam in 1834; after his death it soon flickered out".

=== Conductor ===
Messager conducting at the Opéra, 1908

The wide range of Messager's musical sympathies was noted by Le Menéstral, which said that he "has served Wagner, Debussy, Fauré, Ravel and Stravinsky when their works were still struggling for recognition". He was widely admired as a conductor. He avoided extravagant gesturing on the podium; Harding records, "His manner was precise and undemonstrative. The baton flicked neatly here and there in a way that meant little to the audience behind him but conveyed volumes to the orchestra". The music critic Pierre Lalo wrote that under Messager's direction, Parsifal, without losing any of its grandeur, "assumed a French clarity, and a sobriety, nobility and order ... even the most famous Bayreuth conductors have not always been able to do this." Not everyone shared Lalo's view; some audience members equated undemonstrativeness with dullness: Reynaldo Hahn commented, "[Messager] is not a master of the theatre ["chef du théâtre"], being too exclusively musical; he sets too much store by detail without feeling the spirit of the public behind him, and does not understand the variable musical flow that makes one hold one's breath, sigh and wait." Nevertheless, Hahn admired Messager as an orchestral conductor:

André Messager is the most French of conductors; I mean that in this art he embodies sharpness. Grace and clarity are not uniquely French qualities: they are frequently found among the Italians and even some Germans. But sharpness is a French virtue, and nothing but French. M. André Messager has it to an exceptional degree, and it shows in how he writes, orchestrates, dresses, talks, and plays the piano. But it is when he conducts the orchestra that what one might call his organic sharpness shows itself most forcefully.

=== Recordings ===
In 1918 Messager conducted recordings in New York, with the Orchestre de la Société des Concerts du Conservatoire, of Les Chasseresses and Cortège de Bacchus from Sylvia by Delibes, Sérénade and Mules from Impressions d'Italie by Charpentier, the Bacchanale from Samson et Dalila and the Prelude to Le Déluge, both by Saint-Saëns, and 4½-minute extracts from Capriccio espagnol by Rimsky-Korsakov and Le Rouet d'Omphale by Saint-Saëns. In Wagstaff's 1991 study of Messager, the list of recordings of the composer's music runs to 40 pages; 24 of his works are represented in the list of recordings up to that date.

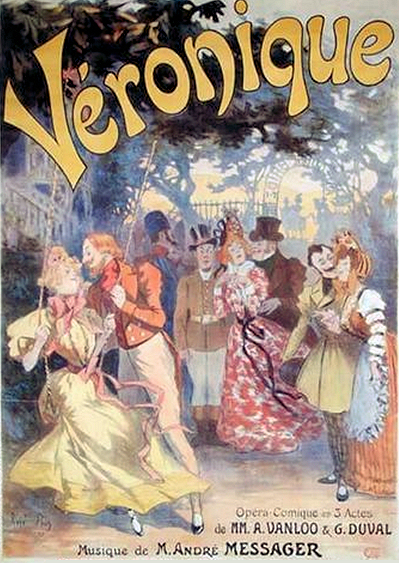
1898 Paris theatre poster

==== Complete operas ====
Complete recordings exist of several of Messager's stage works. There are three complete sets of Véronique – a 1953 mono recording for the Société française du son conducted by Pierre Dervaux, a 1969 stereo EMI recording conducted by Jean-Claude Hartemann, and a 1998 recording sung in English, conducted by J. Lynn Thompson. Other complete sets include L'Amour masqué (1970; conductor, Raymond Legrand), La Basoche (1960; Tony Aubin), Coups de roulis (1963; Marcel Cariven), Fortunio (1987; John Eliot Gardiner), Isoline (1947; Louis Beydts), Monsieur Beaucaire (1958; Jules Gressier), Passionnément (1964; Jean-Paul Kreder; and 2021; Armando Noguera); and Les p'tites Michu (2019; Pierre Dumoussaud).

==== Individual numbers ====
Singers who have recorded individual numbers by Messager include role creators such as Jean Périer (Véronique), Lucien Fugère (La Basoche), Pierre Darmant and Yvonne Printemps (L'Amour masqué), Koval (Passionnément), Marcelle Denya (Coups de roulis), and Maggie Teyte (Monsieur Beaucaire), as well as other contemporaries – Aino Ackté, Emma Eames, and John McCormack – whose recordings have been reissued on compact disc. Singers of the next generation who recorded Messager numbers included Georges Thill and Ninon Vallin. More recent examples include Mady Mesplé, Susan Graham, and Felicity Lott.

==== Non-operatic recordings ====
Of Messager's non-operatic works, his Messe des pêcheurs de Villerville, written jointly with Fauré, has been recorded by, among others, Harmonia Mundi, conducted by Philippe Herreweghe (1989). Messager's other collaboration with Fauré, the Wagner send-up Souvenirs de Bayreuth, has been recorded by piano duettists including Kathryn Stott and Martin Roscoe (1995, Hyperion), and, in an orchestral arrangement, by the orchestra of the Bayreuth Festival. A suite from Les Deux Pigeons has been recorded several times, for example by the Orchestra of the Royal Opera House, Covent Garden, conducted by Hugo Rignold (1948) and by Charles Mackerras (1958); in 1993 Decca recorded the complete score with the Orchestra of Welsh National Opera conducted by Richard Bonynge. His ballet-pantomime Scaramouche was recorded by the Toulon Opera orchestra under Guillaume Tourniaire (2018). The Symphony in A has been recorded by the Orchestre Symphonique du Mans, conducted by José-André Gendille (2001). His Solo de concours – a test piece for clarinet and piano written at Fauré's request for the 1899 clarinet contest at the Paris Conservatoire, demonstrating the clarinettist's skill in both cantabile and virtuoso passages – has been recorded numerous times.

== List of works ==
=== Stage works (except ballets) ===
List of stage works by André Messager
Title	Genre	Year	Acts	Librettists	Notes
Les Païens; The Pagans	opérette	1876	?	Henri Meilhac	(Note: Collaboration with Gaston Serpette, Charles-Marie Widor, Jules Massenet and Léo Delibes. The score is lost.)
François les bas-bleus François the Bluestocking	opéra comique	1883	3	Ernest Dubreuil, Eugène Humbert and Paul Burani	(Note: Completion of work begun by Bernicat. The first London production was presented by Kate Santley in 1885 under the title François the Radical; it was given in the US in 1886 as Victor, the Bluestocking, and a new version was staged in Britain in 1894 by the Carl Rosa Opera Company under the title Fanchette, with English words by Oscar Weill.)
Gisèle	opérette	c. 1884–5	3	F. Oswald and Maxime Boucheron	(Note: Lost score.)
La Fauvette du temple The Temple Songbird	opéra comique	1885	3	Eugène Humbert and Paul Burani	(Note: The London production (1891), under the one-word title Fauvette, had English words by Alfred Rae.)
La Béarnaise; The Woman from Béarn	opéra comique	1885	3	Eugène Leterrier and Albert Vanloo	(Note: The London production (1886) was given under the original French title, with a text translated and adapted by Alfred Murray. An American production (1887) was given under the title Jacquette, with a text adapted by J. Cheever Goodwin.)
Le Petit Poucet; Tom Thumb	féerie	1885	4	Eugène Leterrier, Albert Vanloo and Arnold Mortier	(Note: Messager composed the music for the third-act ballet of this divertissement.)
Le Bourgeois de Calais; The Burgher of Calais	opéra comique	1887	3	Ernest Dubreuil and Paul Burani	
Les premières armes de Louis XV; The First Conquest of Louis XV	opéra comique	1888	3	Albert Carré	(Note: Enlarged version of Bernicat's Les beignets du roi, 1882.)
Isoline	conte des fées	1888	3	Catulle Mendès	
Le Mari de la reine The Queen's Husband	opérette	1889	3	Ernest Grenet-Dancourt and Octave Pradels	
La Basoche; The Guild	opéra comique	1890	3	Albert Carré	(Note: The English version, presented in London in 1891 as The Basoche, was adapted by Augustus Harris and Eugène Oudin. A new adaptation by Madeleine Lucette Ryley was produced in Chicago and New York in 1893.)
Hélène	drame lyrique	1891	4	Paul Delair	(Note: incidental music for play; 5 tableaux.)
Madame Chrysanthème; Madam Chrysanthemum	comédie-lyrique	1893	4	Georges Hartmann and Alexandre André	
Miss Dollar	opérette	1893	3	Charles Clairville and Albert Vallin	(Note: L. Lhérie is mentioned in Grove as a librettist but is not mentioned in the published score or in the work-lists in the studies of Messager by Duteurtre and Wagstaff.)
Mirette	comic opera	1894	3	Michel Carré, Frederic Weatherly, Percy Greenbank and Adrian Ross	(Note: Grove lists Hope Temple as another possible co-author; Duteurtre names her unequivocally.)
Le Chevalier d'Harmental; The Knight of Harmental	opéra comique	1896	5	Paul Ferrier	
La Fiancée en loterie The Raffled Bride	opérette	1896	3	Camille de Roddaz and Alfred Douane	
La Montagne enchantée The Enchanted Mountain	pièce fantastique	1897	5	Albert Carré and Émile Moreau	(Note: 12 tableaux. Collaboration with Xavier Leroux. Messager's contributions were the 3rd and 4th tableaux (of 12) and three other numbers.)
Les P'tites Michu; The Little Michus	opérette	1897	3	Georges Duval and Albert Vanloo	(Note: Presented in an English version, The Little Michus, with text adapted by Henry Hamilton and Percy Greenbank in 1905 in London and 1907 in New York.)
Véronique	opéra comique	1898	3	Georges Duval and Albert Vanloo	(Note: The English version, under the original title, with text adapted by Henry Hamilton, Lilian Eldée and Percy Greenbank, was presented in London and New York in 1905.)
Les Dragons de l'impératrice The Empress's Dragoons	opéra comique	1905	3	Georges Duval and Albert Vanloo	
Fortunio	comédie lyrique	1907	5	Gaston Arman de Caillavet and Robert de Flers	(Note: 5 tableaux. The work was given in a four-act version at its first revival, in 1910.)
Béatrice	légende lyrique	1914	4	Gaston Arman de Caillavet and Robert de Flers	
Cyprien, ôte ta main de là! Hands off, Cyprien!	fantaisie	1916	1	Maurice Hennequin	
Monsieur Beaucaire	romantic operetta	1919	3	Frederick Lonsdale and Adrian Ross	(Note: The French adaptation, by André Rivoire and Pierre Veber, was given in Paris in 1925 and ran for 333 performances in the first run and revivals.)
La Petite Fonctionnaire; The Post-Mistress	comédie musicale	1921	3	Alfred Capus and Xavier Roux	
L'Amour masqué Hidden Love	comédie musicale	1923	3	Sacha Guitry	
Passionnément; Passionately	comédie musicale	1926	3	Maurice Hennequin and Albert Willemetz	
Deburau	musique de scène	1926	4	Sacha Guitry	(Note: The score is dedicated to the memory of Fauré.)
Coups de roulis The Roll of the Ship	opérette	1928	3	Albert Willemetz and Maurice Larrouy	

=== Ballets ===
Single act, except where shown

- Fleur d'oranger 1878
- Les Vins de France 1879
- Mignons et vilains 1879
- Les Deux Pigeons (2 acts) 1886
- Scaramouche (2 acts) 1891 (with Georges Street)
- Amants éternels 1893
- Le Procès des roses 1896
- Le Chevalier aux fleurs 1897 (with Raoul Pugno)
- Une aventure de la Guimard 1900

=== Orchestral ===
- Symphony in A major 1875
- Loreley, ballade for orchestra, c. 1880

=== Chamber and instrumental ===
- 3 valses, piano 4 hands (1884)
- "Souvenirs de Bayreuth", piano 4 hands, with Gabriel Fauré, c. 1888
- For solo piano (1889):
  - Impromptu, Op.10
  - Habañera, Op.11
  - Menuet, Op.12
  - Mazurka, Op.13
  - Caprice polka, Op.14
  - Valse, Op.15
  - "Pavane des fées"
- Trois pièces, violin and piano (1897): Barcarolle, Mazurka, Sérénade
- Solo de concours, clarinet and piano (1899)

=== Choral ===
- Don Juan et Haydée (Byron), cantata, c. 1875
- Prométhée enchaîné (Georges Clerc), cantata, c. 1877
- Messe des pêcheurs de Villerville, with Gabriel Fauré, 1881, for choir with solo violin and harmonium; orchestral accompaniment added 1882.

=== Songs ===
For solo voice with orchestral accompaniment

- Sérénade (Louis Legendre), written for the play Colibri, 1889

For solo voice with piano accompaniment

- "Regret d'avril" (Armand Silvestre) (1882)
- "Chanson de ma mie" (Théodore de Banville) (1882)
- "Mimosa" (Armand Silvestre) (1882)
- "Nouveau printemps" (Heinrich Heine, translated by Georges Clerc), 5 songs (1885), dedicated to Fauré
- "Gavotte" – danse chantée (Théodore de Banville) (1887)
- "Chanson mélancolique" (Catulle Mendès) (1889)
- "La Chanson des cerises" (Armand Silvestre) (1889)
- "Neige rose" (Armand Silvestre) (1889)
- "Fleurs d'hiver" (Armand Silvestre) (1889)
- "O canto do Paris n'America" (unnamed) (1890)
- "À une fiancée" (Victor Hugo) (1891)
- "Arioso" (Paul Burani) (1891)
- "Ritournelle" (Henry Gauthier-Villars) (1894)
- "Chanson d'automne" (Paul Delair) (1894)
- "Chant d'amour" (Armand Silvestre) (1894)
- "Le Bateau rose" (Jean Richepin) (1894)
- "Douce chanson" (Émile Blémont) (1894)
- "Notre amour" (Armand Silvestre) (1896)
- "Aimons nous" (Emile Blémont) (1897)
- "Curly Locks" (Frederic Weatherly) (1897)
- "Amour d'hiver" (Armand Silvestre), 6 songs (1911)
- "Pour la patrie" (Victor Hugo) (1914)
- "La Paix de blanc vêtue" (Léon Lahovary) (1922)
- "Va chercher quelques fleurs" (Louis Aufauvre) (1922)

Sources: Grove Dictionary of Music and Musicians; L'académie nationale de l'opérette; and Wagstaff: André Messager.

== Notes, references and sources ==
=== Sources ===
- Augé-Laribé, Michel (1951). André Messager, musicien de théâtre (in French). Paris: La Colombe. OCLC 43358730.
- Bradley, Ian (1996). The Complete Annotated Gilbert and Sullivan. Oxford: Oxford University Press. ISBN 978-0-19-816503-3.
- Buckle, Richard (1979). Diaghilev. London: Weidenfeld & Nicolson. ISBN 978-0-297-81377-4.
- Delage, Roger (1999). Emmanuel Chabrier (in French). Paris: Fayard. ISBN 978-2-213-60508-1.
- Duteurtre, Benoît (2003). André Messager (in French). Paris: Klincksieck. ISBN 978-2-252-03451-4.
- Escoffier, Auguste (1907). A Guide to Modern Cookery. London: Heinemann. OCLC 560604907.
- Février, Henry (1948). André Messager: mon maître, mon ami (in French). Paris: Amiot-Dumont. OCLC 906458628.
- Franceschina, John (2018). Incidental and Dance Music in the American Theatre from 1786 to 1923, Volume 3. Albany, Georgia: BearManor. ISBN 978-1-62933-237-6.
- Gänzl, Kurt (2001). The Encyclopedia of Musical Theatre, Volume 1 (2nd ed.). New York: Schirmer Books. ISBN 978-0-02-865572-7.
- Grout, Donald Jay; Hermine Weigel Williams (2003). A Short History of Opera. New York: Columbia University Press. ISBN 978-0-231-11958-0.
- Hahn, Reynaldo (1937). L'oreille au guet (in French). Paris: Gallimard. OCLC 186981486.
- Harding, James (1979). Folies de Paris: The Rise and Fall of French Operetta. London: Elm Tree. ISBN 978-0-903443-28-9.
- Holoman, D. Kern (2004). The Société des Concerts du Conservatoire, 1828–1967. Berkeley: University of California Press. ISBN 978-0-520-23664-6.
- Hughes, Gervase (1962). Composers of Operetta. London: Macmillan. OCLC 460660877.
- Hyman, Alan (1978). Sullivan and his Satellites: A Survey of English Operettas 1860–1914. London and New York: Chappell. ISBN 978-0-903443-24-1.
- Johnson, Graham; Richard Stokes (2009). Gabriel Fauré – The Songs and their Poets. Farnham, Kent and Burlington, Vermont: Ashgate. ISBN 978-0-7546-5960-0.
- Jones, J. Barrie (1988). Gabriel Fauré – A Life in Letters. London: Batsford. ISBN 978-0-7134-5468-0.
- Lalo, Pierre (1947). De Rameau à Ravel: portraits et souvenirs (in French). Paris: Michel. OCLC 216123140.
- Letellier, Robert Ignatius (2015). Operetta: A Sourcebook, Volume I. Newcastle upon Tyne: Cambridge Scholars. ISBN 978-1-4438-6690-3.
- Loewenberg, Alfred (1978). Annals of Opera 1597–1940 (Third ed.). London: John Calder. ISBN 978-0-7145-3657-6.
- Martin, Kathy (2016). Famous Brand Names and Their Origins. Barnsley, Yorkshire: Pen and Sword Books. ISBN 978-1-78159-015-7.
- Morrison, Richard (2004). Orchestra: The LSO: a Century of Triumph and Turbulence. London: Faber and Faber. ISBN 978-0-571-21584-3.
- Myers, Rollo (1970). Emmanuel Chabrier and his Circle. Rutherford, NJ: Fairleigh Dickinson University Press. ISBN 978-0-8386-7833-6.
- Nectoux, Jean-Michel (1991). Gabriel Fauré – A Musical Life. Roger Nichols (trans). Cambridge: Cambridge University Press. ISBN 978-0-521-23524-2.
- Nichols, Roger (1987). Ravel Remembered. London: Faber and Faber. ISBN 978-0-571-14986-5.
- Nichols, Roger; Richard Langham Smith (1999). Claude Debussy : Pelléas et Mélisande. Cambridge: Cambridge University Press. ISBN 978-0-521-30714-7.
- Noël, Édouard; Edmond Stoullig (1886). Les Annales du théâtre et de la musique (in French). Paris: G. Charpentier. OCLC 183361820.
- Orledge, Robert (1982). Debussy and the Theatre. Cambridge: Cambridge University Press. ISBN 978-0-521-22807-7.
- Pearson, Hesketh (1954). Gilbert and Sullivan. Harmondsworth, UK: Penguin. OCLC 31472883.
- Rohozinski, Ladislas (1925). Cinquante ans de musique française: de 1874 à 1925 (in French). Paris: Librairie de France. OCLC 163015618.
- Rollins, Cyril; R. John Witts (1962). The D'Oyly Carte Opera Company in Gilbert and Sullivan Operas: A Record of Productions, 1875–1961. London: Michael Joseph. OCLC 504581419.
- Rosenthal, Harold (1958). Two Centuries of Opera at Covent Garden. London: Putnam. OCLC 593682.
- Shaw, Bernard (1981). Shaw's Music – The Complete Musical Criticism of Bernard Shaw. Dan H. Laurence (ed). London: The Bodley Head.
  - Volume II: ISBN 978-0-370-31271-2
  - Volume III: ISBN 978-0-370-31272-9
- Traubner, Richard (2003). Operetta: A Theatrical History. London: Routledge. ISBN 978-0-415-96641-2.
- Vaughan, David (1977). Frederick Ashton and his Ballets. London: A & C Black. ISBN 978-0-7136-1689-7.
- Wagstaff, John (1991). André Messager: A Bio-Bibliography. New York: Greenwood Press. ISBN 978-0-313-25736-0.
- Wearing, J. P. (2014). The London Stage, 1900–1909: A Calendar of Productions, Performers, and Personnel (second ed.). Lanham, Maryland: Greenwood Press. ISBN 978-0-8108-9294-1.

Cultural offices
Preceded by Georges Marty	Principal conductors, Orchestre de la Société des Concerts du Conservatoire; 1908–1919	Succeeded by Philippe Gaubert
Preceded by Pedro Gailhard	director of the Paris Opera; 1908–1914	Succeeded by Philippe Gaubert
