= L'amour masqué =

1923 comédie musicale by André Messager

- Opera by André Messager
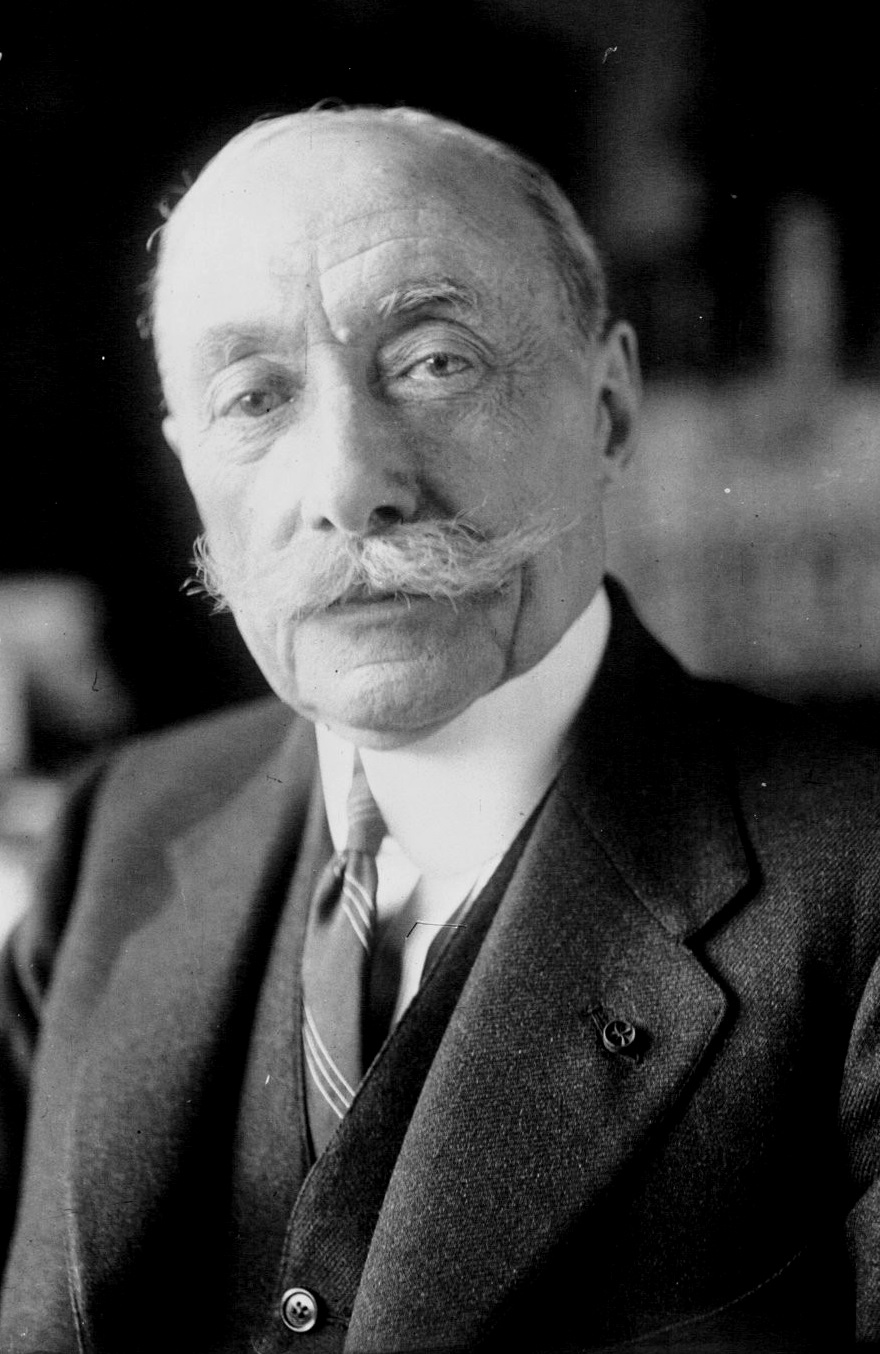
- André Messager in 1921
- Librettist: Sacha Guitry
- Language: French
- Based on: L'amour masqué by Ivan Caryll
- Premiere: 15 February 1923; Théâtre Édouard VII, Paris

L'amour masqué is a comédie musicale in three acts with music by André Messager and a French libretto by Sacha Guitry, based on the work by Ivan Caryll. It was originally to be called J'ai deux amants – the title of a song for Elle in act 1. Messager's orchestration, on a smaller-scale than usual, was necessitated by the size of the pit at the Théâtre Édouard VII, and modelled on the pit bands which played for silent films of the time.

== Performance history ==
L'amour masqué was first performed at the Théâtre Édouard VII, Paris, on 15 February 1923. It was later revived in Lyon, in Paris in 1970 (with Jean Marais and Florence Raynal), and at the Opéra-Comique in 2004.

== Roles ==
| Role | Voice type | Premiere cast, 29 September 1928 (Conductor: André Messager) |
|---|---|---|
| Lui | Spoken role | Sacha Guitry |
| Le baron | Baritone | André Urban |
| L'interprète | Baritone | Louis Maurel |
| Un monsieur | Baritone | Henry Garat |
| Le Maharadjah de Hounk | Baritone | Pierre Darmant |
| Elle | Soprano | Yvonne Printemps |
| Première servante | Soprano | Marthe Ferrare |
| Deuxième servante | Soprano | Marie Dubas |
| Une dame | Soprano | Reine Bernede |
| Une dame | Soprano | Suzanne Duplessis |
| Une dame | Soprano | Duval |

== Synopsis ==
The musicale is set in Paris in the early 1900s.

=== Act 1 ===
Elle, charming and beautiful, is about to celebrate her twentieth birthday; she is not in love with her two rich suitors, the Baron Agnot and the Maharadjah, but takes advantage of their generosity. Her heart has been won by a young man – Lui – whose portrait she had found at a photographers. The baron, whose wife is unfaithful, would marry her, but Elle puts him off. The Maharadjah asks her to hold a ball. Finally, Lui comes to retrieve the photograph; as he not that young, he makes her believe that the photo is his son, as whom he will appear, in disguise, at the ball to which Elle invites him.

=== Act 2 ===
The masked ball. Elle's two servants are dressed identically, disguised as Elle (but with a distinctive item which distinguishes them for their mistress) when they go off with her suitors, the Baron and the Maharadjah. The eight other guests (four women and four men) also pair off. Lui arrives, masked; Elle will give way to the man whom she takes to be the son of her morning visitor.

=== Act 3 ===
Everyone – including Elle and Lui – appears to have taken advantage of the night. Lui reappears, with his mask, not sure how he may sort out the situation and reveal his trick. He brings a farewell letter from his son, but Elle, in sadness, does not open it. However, a prick of a rose thorn, from the previous night, makes Elle realize the identity of her lover. Despite the age difference, she does not worry about one who seemed so young in the intimacy of the night – she has two lovers in the same person: the father and son.

== Recordings ==
- Various excerpts were recorded by Pierre Darmant in 1925 and by Printemps in 1929 and 1941.
- L'amour masqué was recorded on 22–23 July 1964 with the Orchestre Lyrique de l'O.R.T.F. conducted by Marcel Cariven, with Florence Raynal (Elle), Dominique Tirmont (Lui), Bernard Plantey (L'Interprète) and Aimé Doniat (Le Baron).
- A further recording was made with Raynal and Jean Marais.
- L'amour masqué Sophie Marilley (Elle), Jean Manifacier (Lui), Maud Ryaux (Première Servante), Laetitia Ithurbide (Seconde Servante), Ivan Thirion (le Maharadjah), Olivier Dumait (l'Interprète), Frédéric Bang-Rhouet (le Baron), Patrice Laulan (le Maître d'hôtel), Chœur et Orchestre Régional Avignon-Provence, dir. Samuel Jean (2014). 2CD-Livre Actes Sud
