= Neuilly-sur-Seine Old Communal Cemetery =

Cemetery in Hauts-de-Seine, France

Cimetière ancien de Neuilly-sur-Seine
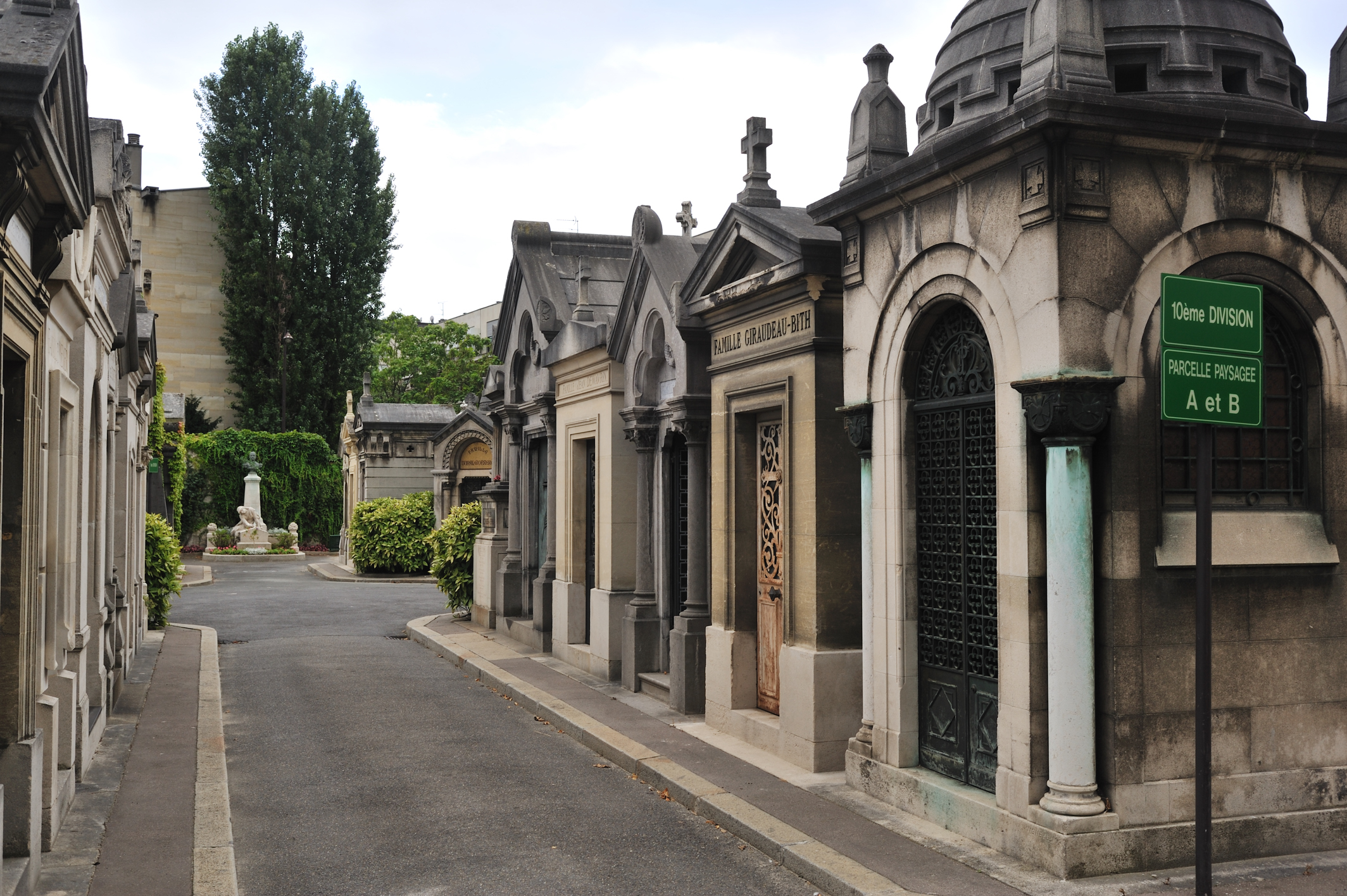
- View of an alley of the Old Cemetery.
- Interactive map of Cimetière ancien de Neuilly-sur-Seine

Details
- Established: 1808
- Location: Neuilly-sur-Seine
- Country: France
- Coordinates: 48.88154°N 2.26430°E
- Type: Public, non-denominational
- Owned by: Mairie de Neuilly-sur-Seine
- Size: 1.13 hectares (2.8 acres)
- No. of interments: 2,253

The Neuilly-sur-Seine Old Communal Cemetery in the Hauts-de-Seine département of France is in the western suburbs of Paris, between Paris and La Défense.

The first is called cimetière ancien (Old Cemetery) and is to be found in Neuilly; the second (New Cemetery) is to be found in Nanterre, near La Défense and adjacent to Paris La Défense Arena, but belongs to Neuilly. It is called cimetière nouveau.

== History ==
The cemetery of the Rue des Poissonniers was created in 1786. Saturated, there was plans to move it when as the French Revolution began. In 1808, a new site was chosen, thanks to an exchange of land with Marshal Joachim Murat, owner of the Château de Villiers. Over the course of the nineteenth century, starting in 1817, the cemetery was gradually enlarged.

It has been called the "old cemetery" since the opening of the new cemetery in Neuilly, in 1886, between Nanterre and Puteaux. In 1905, the municipality decided to build a monument to the dead of the Franco-Prussian War of 1870, a project won by the sculptor Raoul Verlet and the architect Achille Colle.

This small cemetery includes burials with remarkable sculptures, medallions and busts from the late nineteenth and early twentieth centuries, some of which are protected monuments. The old cemetery and several of its burials have been identified by the General Inventory of Cultural Heritage.

== Notable interments ==
=== Old Cemetery ===
- Alessandro Anzani (1877–1956), inventor
- Liliane Bettencourt (1922–2017), principal shareholder L'Oréal
- Henri Betti (1917–2005), composer and pianist
- Louis de Broglie (1892–1987), Nobel Prize Laureate in science
- René Clair (1898–1981), film director
- Pierre Drieu La Rochelle (1893–1945), writer
- Anatole France (1844–1924), novelist
- Pierre Fresnay (1897–1975), actor
- Alexander Glazunov (1865–1936), composer
- André Maurois (1885–1967), writer
- Antonia "La Argentina" Mercé (1890–1936), dancer
- Paul Meurisse (1912–1979), actor
- Pierre Mondy (1925–2012), actor
- Yvonne Printemps (1894–1977), actress and singer
- Pierre Puvis de Chavannes (1824–1898), painter
- Jane Rhodes (1929–2011), operatic soprano
- Alain Robbe-Grillet (1922–2018) author, filmmaker, member of the Académie Française
- Countess Iréne Sampieri (1872–1963), socialite
- Michel Serrault (1928–2007), actor

The cemetery contains one Commonwealth war grave, of a British Red Cross Society officer of World War I.

=== New Cemetery ===
- Grégoire Aslan (1908–1982), actor
- Wassily Kandinsky (1866–1944), painter

The cemetery contains 33 Commonwealth war graves, of 32 service personnel from World War I and one from World War II, as well as an American Legion memorial bearing the names of 250 Americans.
