= The Paris Waltz =

1950 film

- La Valse de Paris poster (1950)
- Directed by: Marcel Achard
- Written by: Marcel Achard
- Produced by: Pierre Gurgo-Salice
- Starring: Yvonne Printemps; Pierre Fresnay; Jacques Charon
- Cinematography: Christian Matras
- Edited by: Yvonne Martin
- Music by: Jacques Offenbach, arranged and directed by Louis Beydts
- Production company: Lux Film
- Distributed by: Lux Film
- Release date: 5 May 1950
- Running time: 92 minutes
- Countries: France; Italy
- Language: French

The Paris Waltz (French: La Valse de Paris) is a 1950 French-Italian historical musical film directed by Marcel Achard and starring Yvonne Printemps, Pierre Fresnay and Jacques Charon. It portrays the life of the nineteenth century composer Jacques Offenbach.

== Synopsis ==
In Paris during the Second Empire, the composer Jacques Offenbach discovers an unknown singer, the soprano Hortense Schneider. He writes lead roles for her in his stage works which make her famous in France and beyond. When he consoles Schneider at the end of her various love affairs their relationship develops and Offenbach falls in love with her. While she is unfaithful to him, he continues to write more operettas featuring her, including several of his most famous works.

== Cast list ==
- Yvonne Printemps as Hortense Schneider
- Pierre Fresnay as Jacques Offenbach
- Jacques Charon as Berthelier
- Noëlle Norman as Marie Pradeau
- Robert Manuel as José Dupuis
- Pierre Dux as General Danicheff
- Denise Provence as Brigitte
- Jacques Castelot as Le duc de Morny
- Raymonde Allain as L'impératrice Eugénie
- Claude Sainval as the prince
- Lucien Nat as Napoleon III
- Léa Gray as La duchesse de Morny
- André Roussin as Henri Meilhac
- Alexandre Astruc as Ludovic Halévy
- Renée Sénac as the mother of Hortense
- Gobin as Chavert - the stage director
- Michel Salina as the tsar
- Pierre Juvenet as the witness
- Lisette Lebon as a lady-in-waiting
- Caroline Carlotti as a dancer
- Max Dalban as a remover
- Bernard Farrel as the aide-de-camp
- Jacques Dynam as the Calife of Ramsoun
- Jean Hébey as the diner

== Background ==
Filming took place at Fontainebleau (Seine-et-Marne) and at the Studios de Boulogne. Printemps's costumes were by Christian Dior. Fresnay and Printemps had been partners in private life since 1932 when her marriage to Sacha Guitry broke up, and they had worked together since Coward's Conversation Piece in April 1934 where he won excellent reviews, and their stage partnership was greatly admired. In the same year Printemps and Fresnay had a screen hit in Abel Gance's La dame aux camélias, and between then and 1951 they appeared together in eight films. Raymonde Allain had already played the Empress Eugénie in the 1937 film Les Perles de la couronne.

The music was by Offenbach, arranged by Louis Beydts. The film credits end by a dialogue between the screenwriter and Offenbach in shadow show:

« Marcel Achard. Excusez-moi des libertés que j'ai prise avec la vérité. (I'm sorry for the liberties I took with the truth)
Jacques Offenbach. Oh, j'ai l'habitude... Mais j'espère que vous n'avez pas touché à ma musique ! (Oh, I'm used to that... but I hope that you didn't play with my music)
Marcel Achard. Bien sûr que non, mon cher maître ! (Of course not dear maestro!) »

The music uses songs from Offenbach's stage works La Chanson de Fortunio, La Vie parisienne, La Périchole, Madame Favart, La Belle Hélène, La Grande-Duchesse de Gérolstein and Belle Lurette, (Schneider created the title roles in La Périchole, La Belle Hélène and La Grande-Duchesse de Gérolstein).

The reviewer in Sight and Sound described La Valse de Paris as "a stylised musical" and praised Fresnay's "delightful, lightly caricatured portrayal of Offenbach, and noted Printemps's "grace and waywardness and allure". Although the first screen work with the composer as principal character, Offenbach scholar Jean-Claude Yon considers the film's direction as "casual", with Achard resorting to clichés; he also finds Printemps unconvincing as Schneider, spoiling the subtilty of Fresnay personation. From a marxist approach of Siegfried Kracauer (a major German biographer of 1938) and the Offenbach in Montmartre of Manuel Rosenthal (referring to the ballet Gaîté Parisienne, the same year) Achard's 1950s Offenbach is "precious" with little to do with the real person.

== Bibliography ==
- Hayward, Susan. French Costume Drama of the 1950s: Fashioning Politics in Film. Intellect Books, 2010.
