= Messe des pêcheurs de Villerville =

Missa brevis written by Gabriel Fauré in collaboration with André Messager

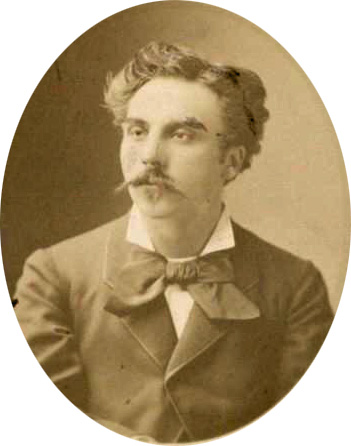
Gabriel Fauré in 1875

The Messe des pêcheurs de Villerville (Mass of the fishermen of Villerville) is a missa brevis written by Gabriel Fauré in collaboration with his former pupil André Messager. A later version, published as Messe basse contained only movements composed by Fauré.

== Messe des pêcheurs de Villerville (1881) ==
Fauré and Messager worked together on the mass in the summer of 1881.

The sections of the mass run as follows:

1. Kyrie (Messager)
2. Gloria (Fauré)
3. Sanctus (Fauré)
4. O Salutaris (Messager)
5. Agnus Dei (Fauré)

The first performance took place in Villerville on 4 September 1881 accompanied by a harmonium and a violin. The concert was in aid of the fishermen's charitable association. Messager orchestrated the first four sections, and Fauré the last. A second performance, this time accompanied by orchestra, was given in Villerville the following year.

== Messe basse (published 1907) ==
In 1907, Heugel & Cie. published a version of the mass, removing Messager's sections and the Gloria (apart from a part of its music that was reused for the added Benedictus), and incorporating a new Kyrie by Fauré; this version, produced by Fauré in 1906, appeared under the title Messe basse.
