= Maurice Larrouy (writer) =

Maurice Larrouy (French pronunciation: [mɔʁis laʁwi]; 9 June 1882 – 18 July 1939, in Meung-sur-Loire) was a French marine officer and writer, also known by his pseudonym "René Milan".

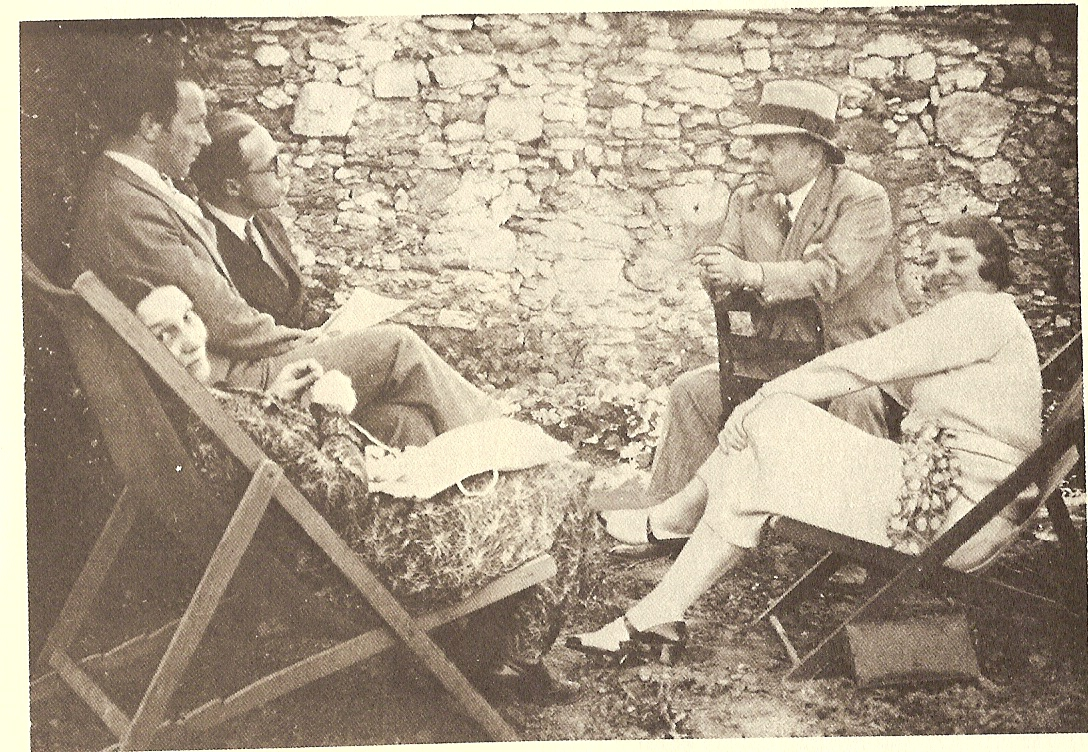
Robert Burnier, Pierre Vellones both left and "René Milan" in hat. In the foreground, Marie-Louise Casadesus and Nina Myral.

== Biography ==
The son of a commissioner general of the Navy, Larrouy was received major at the École Navale in 1901, became a naval officer in 1903, patented interpreter of English in 1911, ship lieutenant in 1913, and patented pilot of airship. After he resigned in 1919 to devote himself to literature, he was promoted to the rank of reserve captain of corvette (1926) and then captain of frigate. An officier of the Légion d’honneur and holder of the Croix de guerre 1914–1918, he married in the 2nd arrondissement of Paris Denise Decori on 20 December 1916, the daughter of Félix Decori (1860–1915), a lawyer, secretary general of the Presidency of the Republic (1914), in the presence of president Raymond Poincaré, Louis Barthou, Alfred Capus of the Académie française, witnesses of the bride, and Pierre Mille, his best man.

At the beginning of the 20th century, he published maritime and exotic novels, some of which were somewhat successful such as L'Odyssée d'un transport torpillé (Prix Femina 1917) or Coup de roulis. These books were written in the spirit of other naval officers, like Pierre Loti, Claude Farrère or Paul Chack. He presented himself at the Académie française on 24 May 1934 and obtained 2 votes against 9 to Edmond Jaloux and 24 to Maurice de Broglie, who was elected. He was vice-president of the Société des gens de lettres.

The first edition of some novels indicates the pseudonym René Milan or the letter "Y". Bibliophiles know that he signed a large number of copies of the print run of the original edition of his books.

== Works ==
- 1912: La race immortelle, roman épique, under the pseudonym René Milan
- 1915: Les Vagabonds de la gloire (prix Davaine; prix de la Ligue maritime française 1916), first published under the pseudonym René Milan and then reissued under his real name.
  - I - Campagne d'un croiseur
  - II - Trois étapes
  - III - Matelots aériens
- 1917: L'Odyssée d'un transport torpillé, Éditions Payot, (prix Fémina). Maurice Larrouy wrote this story in four weeks. The publication appeared anonymously in episodes in the "Revue de Paris" in 1917, in the middle of the world conflict. The publisher did not submit the first part to censorship, but the following part was truncated and the third part, deemed dangerous, formally prohibited, the author from recounting daily life on board a ship in the form of letters or diary aboard a merchant navy of refuelling.
- 1921: Raphaël Gatouna, Français d'occasion
- 1923: Gatouna et l'Amour
- 1924: Le Révolté, a maritime novel that inspired a film in 1938
- 1925: Coups de roulis, a novel of which Albert Willemetz drew inspiration in 1928 for the operetta composed by André Messager
- 1926: La caravane sur l'Atlantique
- 1926: Leurs Petites majestés, Indochinese novel. The novel tells in a rather light way the embarkation and the cruise on the adviso Roncevaux of a king of the kingdom of Sikar (Indochina peninsula), his majesty Pharnavong, his prime minister Prince Ploum, his first mandarin Bang and his three younger wives. The arrival of this little world on a ship of war, however small, considerably disrupts the life of the Pacha, the lieutenant of Kerquibec, and his two officers, ensigns Goyenne, second officer, and Quintard, not to mention the crew ...
- 1927: Le marin
- 1927: Sirènes et tritons, le roman du sous-marin
- 1928: Trop de Bonheur
- 1928: Le Trident
- 1930: Les sept sacrements, roman d'un marin
- 1931: Eaux brûlantes, Paris, is a narrative of travel from France to Indochina. The first chapter relates the life aboard the steamer André-Lebon during the few weeks of transit. The book then describes French Indochina during the colonial exhibition, in a very "colonially correct" genre. It nevertheless offers a good testimony on this great colony at the time of the apogee of the biggest France. A few pages are devoted to the attempted record air link France-Far East by Joseph Le Brix. He also devotes a chapter to Java.
- 1933: Le cargo tragique, Paris
- 1933: La vénus standard, Paris
- 1934: Eaux glacées, Paris, travel history in Manchuria, Japan, Canada and the United States.
- 1934: L’Invincible Armada
- 1936: Arches de discorde
- 1937: La grande fraude, Paris

== Bibliography ==
- Moniot Beaumont, René. "Les écrivains de romans historiques maritimes". Histoire de la littérature maritime. La Découvrance. pp. 329–331.
