= Le bourgeois de Calais =

Opéra comique in three acts

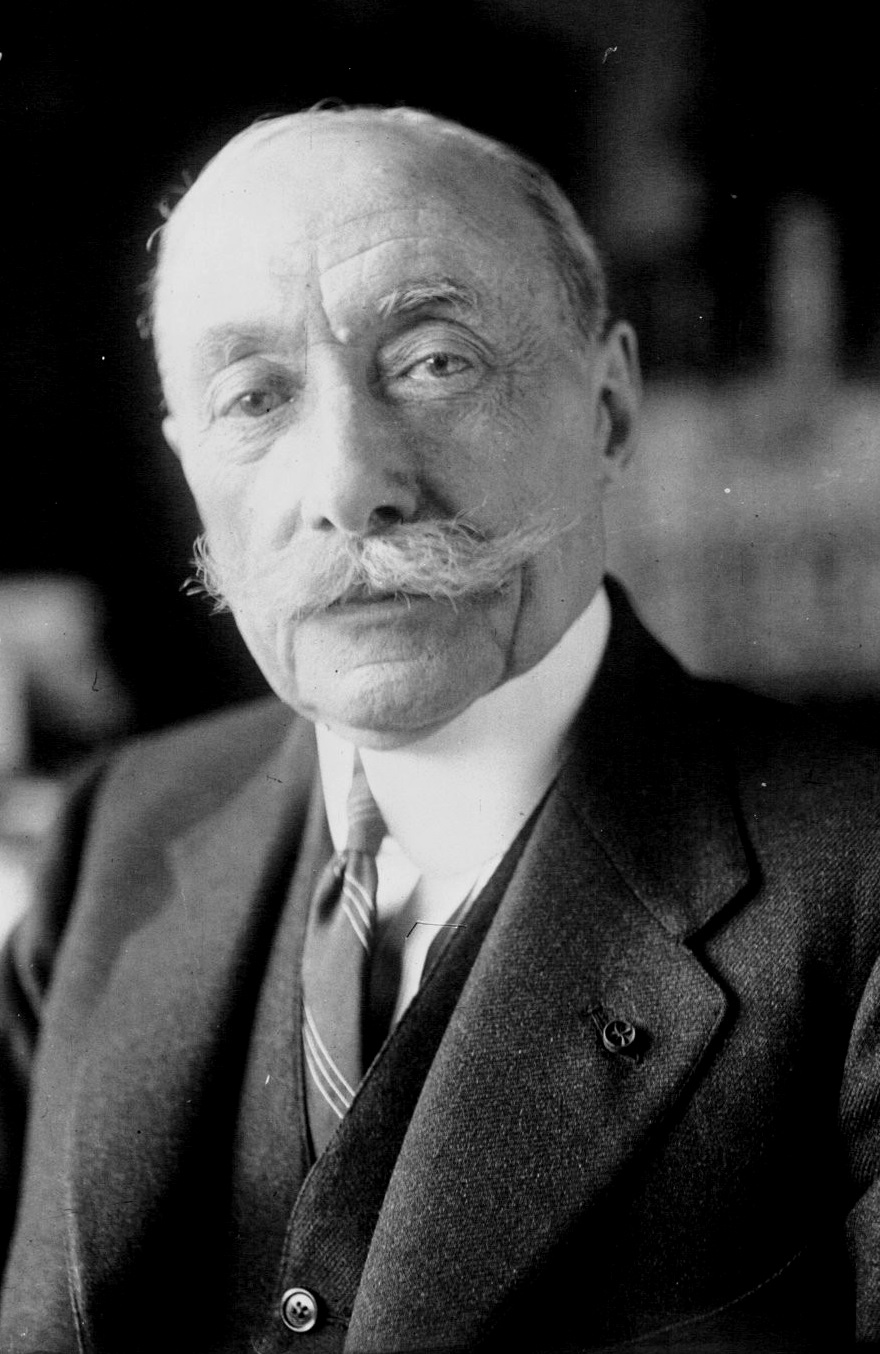
André Messager, 1921

Le bourgeois de Calais is an opéra comique in three acts of 1887, with music by André Messager and a French libretto by Ernest Dubreuil, Paul Burani.

It was first performed at the Théâtre des Folies-Dramatiques on 6 April 1887 and, despite the praise for Messager's music, ran only for 17 performances. Le bourgeois de Calais has parallels with the contemporary French feelings towards loss of Alsace and Lorraine.

== Roles ==
Role	Voice type	Premiere Cast, 6 April 1887 (Conductor: D Thibault)
Le duc de Guise	baritone	Morlet
Lord Tréfort	tenor	Gobin
André	baritone	Dechesne
Maître Aubriet	bass	Bellucci
Chevalier de Champagnolles	tenor	A Guyon
Kerkadec	baritone	Lauret
Mitonnet	baritone	Duhamel
Un sergent	tenor	Speck
D’Andelot		Milot
Comtesse de Civrac	mezzo-soprano	Juliette Darcourt
Marthe	soprano	Lydie Borel
René	tenor	Fanzi
Chorus: Servants, Soldiers, Townspeople.

== Synopsis ==
The opera is set in January 1558.
Henri II recalls the Duc de Guise from Italy and makes him Lieutenant General of the kingdom. The king and all France see de Guise as their protector - and he must live up this hope. On January 1, 1558, the French army reaches Calais. The English garrison is weak. Two forts guard the city approaches, one by sea, one by land; they are captured at the same time on January 3 after a few canon shots. The sea fortress, Risbanc, commanded the port and all communication between Calais and England. On January 6 the Duc de Guise and his men cross the harbour at low tide and lay siege to the castle, Guise leaving there his best men. When the tide comes in, breaking the lines between the castle and the French army, the English try to retake the fort but are repulsed. The governor of Calais surrenders the town the day after. The English citizens are allowed to leave without their possessions. The town is French again after 210 years of English occupation.

By disguising himself in the clothes of the sailor André (fiancé of Marthe, daughter of Aubriet, an alderman of Calais), de Guise can enter the square and bring in his troops right under the nose of the English governor Lord Tréfort. In a subplot, the Comtesse believes – after a prophecy in Nostradamus - she may become the Duchess de Guise, while André thinks he has been duped by the Duke.

Of Messager's score, contemporary writers particularly noted the quartet "Vous avez dans mon ame", the military finale of the first act, the introduction to the second, the scene of the swearing of allegiance, the couplets "C’est une merveilleuse idée", the third act romance "Je vais errant a l’aventure" and the comic song "L'Anglais, premier people du monde".
