= Georges Street =

German-born French composer (1854 – 1908)

Georges Street (21 January 1854 – 6 February 1908) was a German-born French composer.

== Life ==
He was born in Hamburg, the son of Agnes Street-Klindworth (1825–1906) and an unknown father. His mother had briefly been married to a Paris-born Englishman, Ernest Denis-Street, and her son, christened Ernst August Georg, was given the surname Street. Agnes had an affair with the composer Franz Liszt in the mid-1850s, and some suspected that Liszt was the boy's father. In 1868, Agnes moved to Paris together with her widowed father and her sons Georges and Charles.

Street showed musical talent, which his mother encouraged. He took violin lessons with Hubert Léonard and became a follower and supporter of Georges Bizet. Together with André Messager, Maurice Lefèvre and Raoul Pugno, Street regularly played through the score of Bizet's Carmen, which they regarded as "the opera of the century". The musical scholar Alan Walker comments that it was partly due to the advocacy of Street and Messager that the Paris Opéra took Carmen into its regular repertory.

Street and Messager collaborated to compose the score of the 1891 ballet Scaramouche, to a scenario by Lefèvre and Henri Vuagneux. Street's opérette Mignonette (1896), was a parody of Ambroise Thomas's opera Mignon, written thirty years earlier. Street's other theatre works include Au profit des pauvres, Le Dernier des Muelshausen, Kaen, and La Grande légende.

Later in his career, Street became music critic for the newspapers L'Éclair and Le Matin, and was the founding editorial secretary of the latter.

Street died in Paris at the age of fifty-four.

== Sources ==
- Messager, André; Georges Street, Maurice Lefèvre and Henri Vuagneux (1890). Scaramouche: Pantomime-ballet en 2 actes et 4 tableaux. Paris: Choudens fils. OCLC 21820052.
- Pocknell, Pauline (2000). Franz Liszt and Agnes Street-Klindworth : a correspondence, 1854–1886. Hillsdale, NY: Pendragon Press. ISBN 978-1-57647-006-0.
- Walker, Alan (1993). Franz Liszt. Ithaca, NY: Cornell University Press. ISBN 978-0-8014-9421-5.
