= Yvonne Printemps =

French singer and actress (1894–1977)

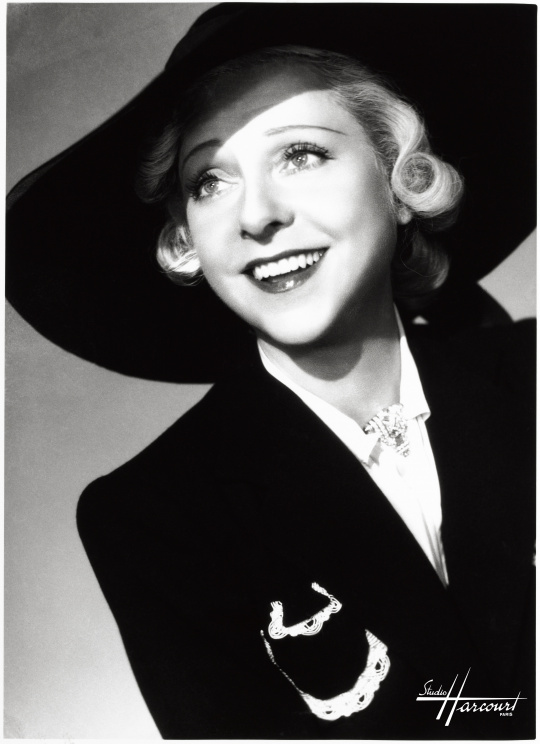
- Printemps in 1943
- Born: Yvonne Wigniolle; 25 July 1894; Ermont, Paris, France
- Died: 19 January 1977 (aged 82); Neuilly, Paris, France
- Resting place: Neuilly-sur-Seine community cemetery, Neuilly, France
- Occupations: Actress; singer
- Years active: 1909–1975
- Spouse: Sacha Guitry (m. 1919; div. 1932)

Yvonne Printemps (French: [ivɔn pʁɛ̃tɑ̃]; born Yvonne Wigniolle; 25 July 1894 – 19 January 1977) was a French singer and actress who achieved stardom on stage and screen in France and internationally.

Printemps went on the stage in Paris at the age of 12, and at 21 she was singled out by the actor, director and playwright Sacha Guitry as a leading lady. In 1919 they were married, and worked closely together until 1932, when they divorced. Printemps never remarried, but had a personal and professional partnership with the actor Pierre Fresnay which lasted until his death in 1975.

As a performer, Printemps was famed for the quality of her singing voice and for her personal charm. Among those who composed for her were André Messager, Reynaldo Hahn, Noël Coward and Francis Poulenc. Her voice could have led her to an operatic career, but guided by Guitry she concentrated on operette and other types of musical show, along with non-musical plays and films. In addition to her many successes in Paris she appeared to great acclaim in the West End of London, and on Broadway in New York.

== Biography ==
=== Early years ===
Printemps was born in Ermont, a northern suburb of Paris, as Yvonne Wigniolle. Despite the misgivings of what she later described as "my highly bourgeois family", she made her debut as a performer at the age of 12 in a revue at La Cigale in Paris. The music critic J. B. Steane writes of her, "A career at the Opéra-Comique seemed possible, for she had a voice of delightful quality with prodigious breath control."

The possibility of an operatic career did not materialise. Printemps was dancing at the Folies Bergère at the age of 13. She was given the sobriquet Printemps (springtime) by her fellow chorus members because of her sunny disposition, and adopted it as her stage name. She appeared in small roles in light musical shows such as Les Contes de Perrault (1913). Louis Verneuil saw her in one of them while he was writing a revue, 1915, and insisted on casting her in the leading part in it. In the revue she performed a parody of the actor-playwright Sacha Guitry, "whose mannerisms she imitated with spry irreverence." Guitry's wife, Charlotte, saw the show, was greatly amused and soon afterwards brought her husband to see it.

=== Early work and marriage ===
Georges Feydeau, Sarah Bernhardt (witnesses), with the groom and bride (r) at the wedding of Sacha Guitry and Printemps, 1919

In November 1915 Guitry cast Printemps in his new revue, which he directed but did not appear in. A year later they acted together in his new comedy, Jean de la Fontaine. It was rumoured that Printemps was having an affair with Guitry's father, the eminent actor Lucien Guitry; whatever the truth of that rumour, it is undisputed that she became romantically involved with Sacha. Charlotte Guitry, discovering the liaison, left her husband; they divorced in 1918 and in April 1919 he married Printemps.

Guitry wrote many plays for her, some musical and others straight comedies. Both he and his father appeared with her in several of them, including Mon Père avait raison and Comment on ecrit l'histoire. They played together not only in Paris, but in the West End of London. All three appeared at the Aldwych Theatre in a four-week season in 1920. Sir John Gielgud wrote that Printemps and her husband "returned … many times to delight London in various pieces artfully contrived by him to show them both off to the best possible advantage." He described her thus:

With a trim, elegant figure, appealing spaniel eyes, and a broad turned-up nose not unlike that of our own Gertrude Lawrence ... her acting had something of the same inimitable brand of impish sentimental comedy. But unlike Gertie Lawrence, whose singing voice, fascinating though it was, could be distinctly unreliable and wobbly, Printemps' tones were exquisitely delicate and true. She was sometimes tempted, perhaps, to prolong her top notes unduly in order to show off her brilliant breath control, and to yield rather too easily to demands for encores.

Guitry and Printemps in Mozart (1925)

In 1925, Guitry had the idea of writing a musical comedy about the life of the youthful Wolfgang Amadeus Mozart while in Paris in the 1770s. To compose the score he approached André Messager, with whom he had successfully collaborated in 1923 on a show for Printemps, L'amour masqué. Messager was unavailable and recommended the young composer Reynaldo Hahn, who accepted the commission. The resulting production, Mozart, took some liberties with historical accuracy, but it proved highly popular. Printemps, in a breeches role, played and sang the young Mozart, with Guitry as the composer's patron, Baron Grimm. Gielgud recalled, "she seemed ravishingly youthful and touching in her powdered wig, black knee breeches and buckled shoes, while Sacha hovered over her with avuncular authority, not attempting to try to sing himself, but contributing a kind of flowing, rhythmic accompaniment with his speeches, delivered in a deep caressing voice." After playing successfully at the Théâtre Edouard VII, the company presented the piece for a three-week season in London in June and July 1926. The critic James Agate wrote, "It is not exaggerating to say that on Monday evening people were observed to cry, and by that I mean shed tears, when Music's heavenly child appeared at the top of the stairs. At that moment of her entrance this exquisite artist made conquest of the house, and subsequently held it in thrall until the final curtain." After the London production, Guitry took the piece to Broadway, Boston and Montreal in late 1926 and early 1927.

=== Later life and career ===
In 1932 Printemps's marriage to Guitry broke up. Guitry soon remarried; Printemps never did so, but became the personal and professional partner of the actor Pierre Fresnay. In February 1934 she had a personal success in London in Noël Coward's Conversation Piece. Coward wrote the role of Melanie with Printemps in mind, and as she spoke practically no English, she learned the part phonetically. Her singing of the big romantic number, "I'll follow my secret heart", was the highlight of the show. The Times said of her performance:

Mlle. Printemps is enchanting. That we did not sooner guess the secret of her secret heart must have been our own fault, for in all else, in every detail of mockery and feeling, she is brilliantly explicit, throwing a glitter of laughing cynicism over every scene in which she appears.

The Observer said, "The best conversation in this piece is not that which occurs on the stage, but that which flashes over the footlights between the bright eyes of Miss Yvonne Printemps and her fascinated audience." Her co-star at the premiere was Coward himself; he habitually avoided long stage runs, and handed over his role to Fresnay in April 1934. Fresnay too won excellent reviews, and his stage partnership with Printemps was greatly admired. In the same year Printemps and Fresnay had a screen hit in Abel Gance's La dame aux camélias. Between then and 1951 she was in eight films alongside him.

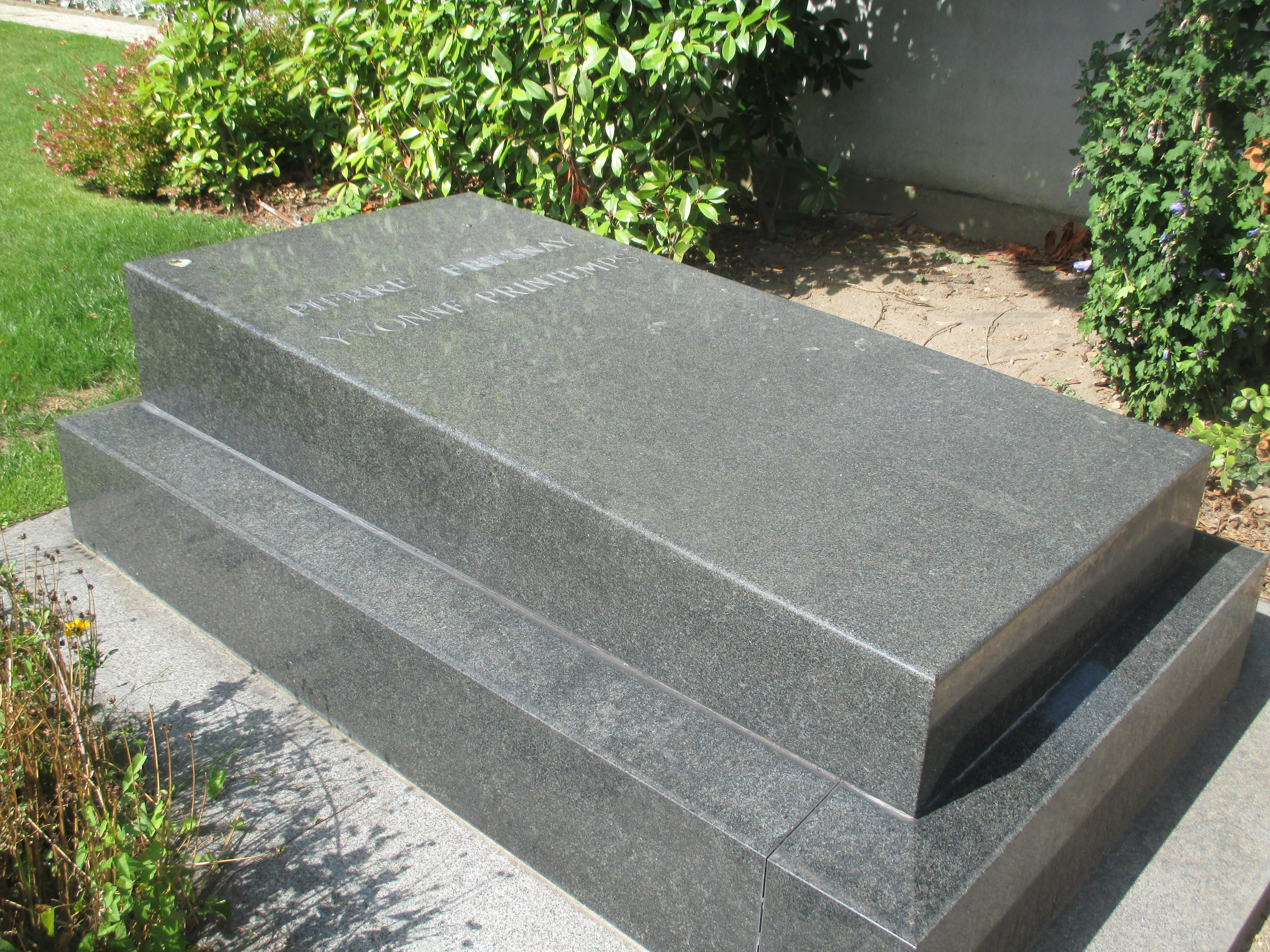
Her grave with Pierre Fresnay in Neuilly-sur-Seine.

In 1937, Printemps had another great success in musical comedy with Oscar Straus's Drei Waltzer, given in French as Trois valses. She and Fresnay starred in the piece on the Parisian stage and on film (Les trois valses). The critic Richard Traubner commented in 2006 that because of the performances of Printemps and Fresnay the film still "hangs over anyone who dares revive the operetta on stage". In 1946 Printemps had another hit in Marcel Achard's Auprès de ma blonde. In 1950 she appeared as Hortense Schneider with Fresnay as Jacques Offenbach, in Achard's film La Valse de Paris. She continued to perform on stage until she was well into her sixties, and remained active with Fresnay, co-directing the Théâtre de la Michodière in Paris with him until his death in 1975.

Printemps died in the Paris suburb of Neuilly in 1977 aged 82. She is interred with Fresnay in the Neuilly-sur-Seine community cemetery.

== Films ==
- Un roman d'amour et d'aventures (1918) (dir. René Hervil and Louis Mercanton)
- Camille (1926)
- The Lady of the Camellias (1934) (dir. Abel Gance) (as Marguerite Gautier)
- Trois valses (1938) (dir. Ludwig Berger and Albert Willemetz) (as Fanny, Yvette and Irène Grandpré)
- Adrienne Lecouvreur (1938) (dir. Marcel L'Herbier) (in the title role)
- Le Duel (1939) (dir. Pierre Fresnay) (as Thérèse Jaillon)
- I Am with You (1943) (dir. Henri Decoin) (as Élisabeth and Irène)
- Convicted (1948) (dir. Georges Lacombe)
- The Paris Waltz (1950) (dir. Marcel Achard) (as Hortense Schneider)
- The Voyage to America (1951) (dir. Henri Lavorel) (as Clotilde Fournier)

== See also ==
- Plays and films of Sacha Guitry
