= Hortense Schneider =

French singer and actor

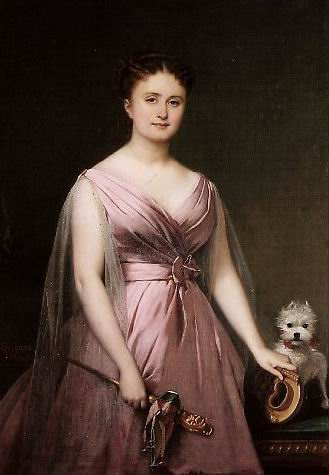
- Hortense Schneider in 1868
- Born: 30 April 1833; Bordeaux, Kingdom of France
- Died: 5 May 1920 (aged 87); Paris, France
- Resting place: Protestant Cemetery, Bordeaux
- Occupation: Soprano

Hortense Catherine Schneider, La Snédèr, (30 April 1833 in Bordeaux, France – 5 May 1920, in Paris, France) was a French soprano, one of the greatest operetta stars of the 19th century, particularly associated with the works of composer Jacques Offenbach.

== Biography ==
Born in Bordeaux as Jeanne Catherine Schneider, where she studied with Schaffner, she made her debut in Agen in 1853, as Inès in La favorite. She chose the stage name "Hortense" after the Emperor's mother.

She came to Paris and was turned down by the director of the Théâtre des Variétés but was noticed by Jacques Offenbach who invited her to the Théâtre des Bouffes Parisiens, where she made her debut in 1855 in Le violoneux. She enjoyed immediate success and created for Offenbach the role of Boulotte in Barbe-bleue and the title roles in La belle Hélène, La Grande-Duchesse de Gérolstein and La Périchole, all resounding triumphs. She also appeared in London and Saint Petersburg, to great acclaim.

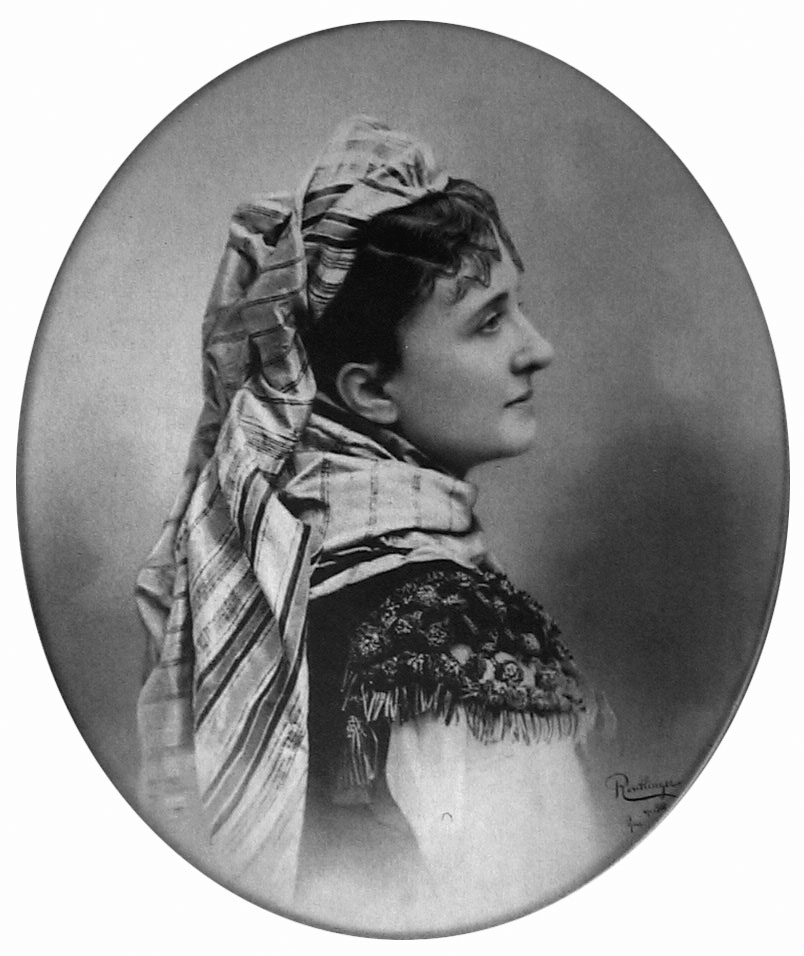
Schneider as la Périchole

An accomplished singer and actress, she was much admired for her brio and verve on stage, was the toast of the Second Empire and a favourite of royal visitors to Paris. La Snédèr was reputedly one of King Edward VII's mistresses (because of the favours which she liberally granted to the members of the nobility, she was known as Le Passage des Princes.). She retired after her marriage in 1878 and died in Paris in 1920; her body rests at the Protestant cemetery in Bordeaux.

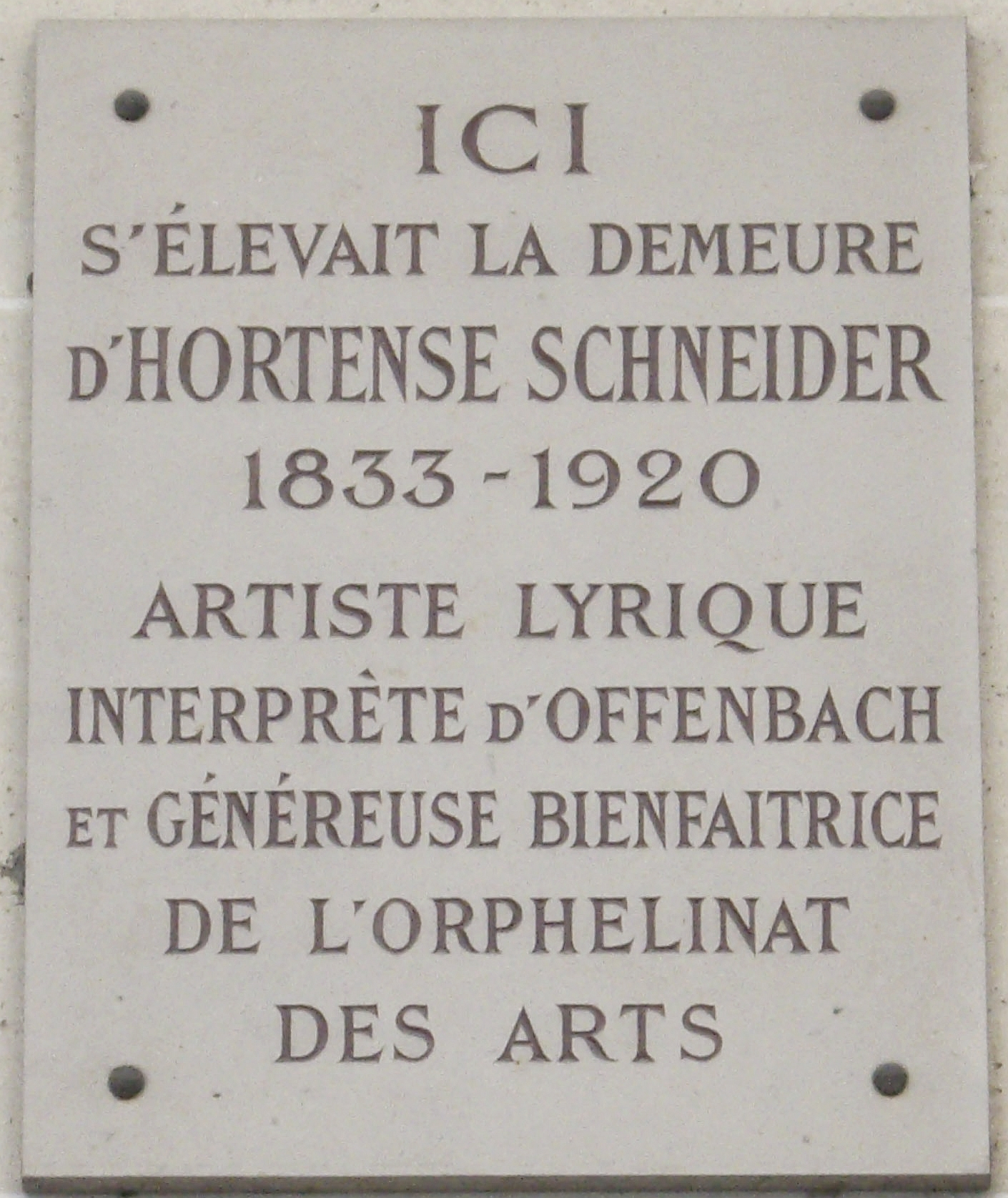
Plaque at site of Schneider's avenue de Versailles home

Her house at 123 Avenue de Versailles was given to L'Orphelinat des Arts (The Association / Les Enfants des Arts) in her will, with an instruction not to change the interior until 1950.

Schneider was the subject of the 1950 film La Valse de Paris by Marcel Achard, where she was played by Yvonne Printemps.

== Sources ==
- Le guide de l'opéra, Roland Mancini & Jean-Jacques Rouveroux, (Fayard, 1986) ISBN 2-213-01563-5
- La diva d'Offenbach. Hortense Schneider (1833–1920), Jean-Paul Bonami, (Romillat, 2004) ISBN 2-87894-080-6
- Peter Hawig: Hortense Schneider. Bedingungen und Stationen einer Erfolgsbiographie. Bad Emser Hefte, Nr. 258. VGDL, Bad Ems 2006, 47 S.
- Friedman, Dennis (2003). Ladies of the Bedchamber. London: Peter Owen Publishers.
