= Isoline (opera) =

Opera on a text by Catulle Mendès

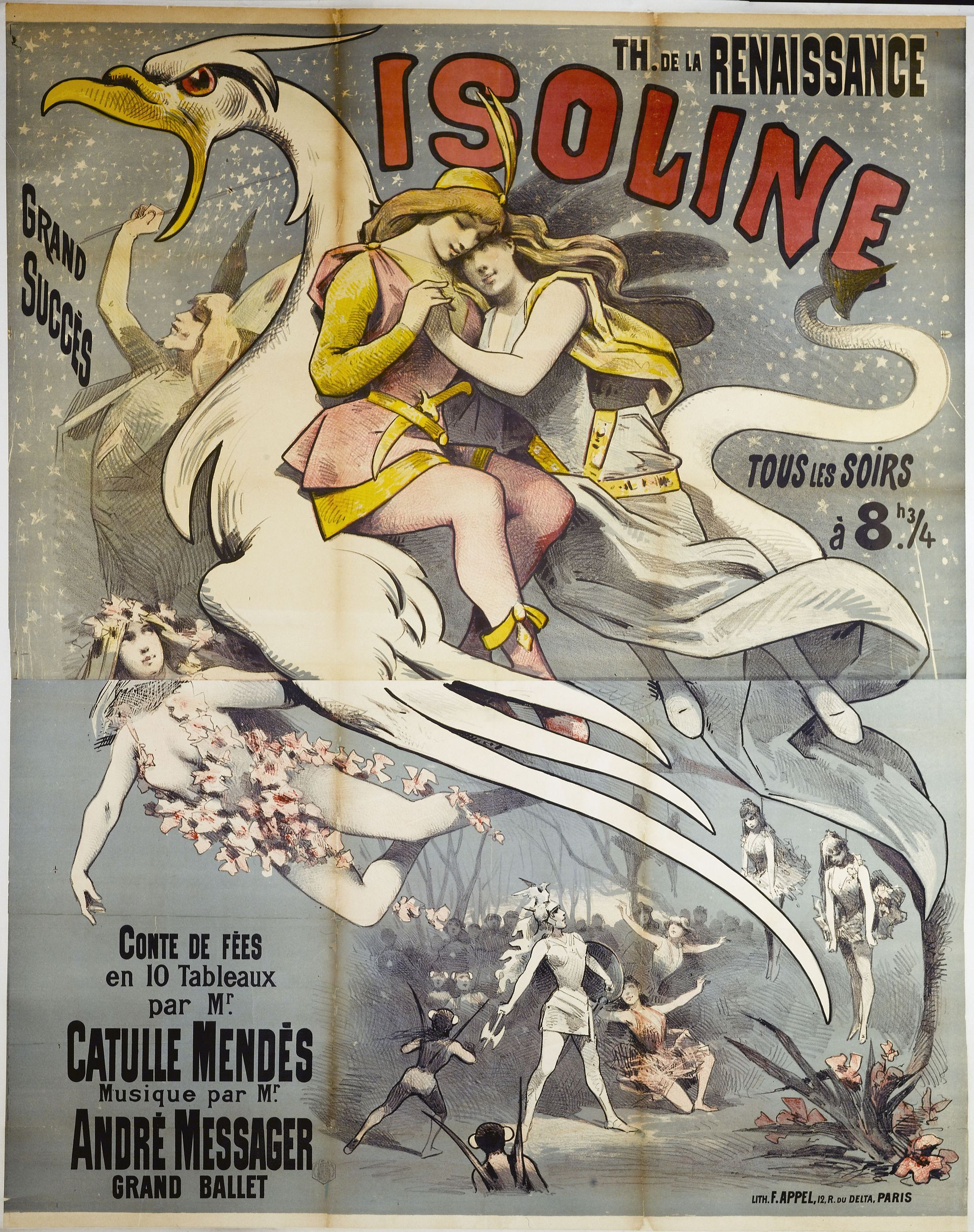
Poster for the premiere

Isoline is an opera, described as a conte de fées (fairy story) in three acts and ten tableaux, on a text by Catulle Mendès, with music by André Messager.

== Background ==
In mid-1888 Catulle Mendès had promised the libretto of Isoline to Emmanuel Chabrier but according to the writer, the Théâtre de la Renaissance wanted Messager to write the music, as he was better known for writing operettas and Chabrier had "too much talent, a talent too epic and grand".

Messager had already composed incidental music for Le petit Poucet, a féerie staged at the Théâtre de la Gaîté in 1885. Messager probably wrote some of the score at Montivillers, near to Le Havre; in order to complete the orchestration in time, he was assisted by Paul Lacôme, a composer and friend of Chabrier. Just after the première, the theatre started heading towards bankruptcy, although nearly 60 performances took place up to mid February (with the conductor Paul Letombe).

== Performance history ==
Isoline was premiered at the Théâtre de la Renaissance, Paris, on 26 December 1888. In the initial run, Isoline was staged for one matinée and 57 evenings, closing on 20 February 1889.

In 1930, Reynaldo Hahn directed a single performance at the Casino in Cannes. The Opéra-Comique gave a series of performances in 1958 directed by Jean-Pierre Ponnelle and conducted by Georges Prêtre. Liliane Berton sang Isoline, Gabriel Bacquier Obéron, and Isolin was made into a tenor, sung by Alain Vanzo.

Three broadcast recordings have been made of the work:

- 21 September 1947 – on Radio France with Janine Micheau (Isoline), Jane Rolland (Isolin) and Willy Clément (Obéron), conducted by Louis Beydts (re-issued by Institut national de l'audiovisuel);
- 8 July 1955, with Liliane Berton, Christiane Jacquin and Camille Maurane, conducted by Jules Gressier; and
- 18 October 1969, with Lina Dachary, Janine Capderou and Bernard Demigny, conducted by Marcel Cariven.

== Roles ==
Roles, voice types, and premiere cast
Role	Voice type	Premiere cast, 26 December 1888 (Conductor: Paul Letombe)
Eros, Obéron	baritone	Louis-Auguste Morlet
Daphnis	tenor	Josef Wolff
Isolin	soprano	Marie-Puebla Nixau
Titania	soprano	Berthe Thibault
Isoline	soprano	Antonia-Louise Aussourd
La Reine Amalasonthe	mezzo-soprano	France
Rosélio	tenor	Mlle Theven
La belle fille, Violante	soprano	Germaine Gallois
Une pensionnaire, Nicette	soprano	Germaine Lapierre
Chloë	soprano	Précourt
First Désolée	mezzo-soprano	Burty
Second Désolée	soprano	Jeanne Tiphaine
Chorus: Four Eros, Duègnes, Désolées, Moines, Demoiselles d'Honneur

== Synopsis ==
As a result of a quarrel between Oberon and Titania over a child, a present from the Empress of the Indies, Oberon has condemned the 16-year-old Princess Isoline to be transformed into a man in her bridal bed on the day of her marriage. To avoid this fate Isoline has been cloistered with her maids of honour in the turret of a castle of her mother Queen Amalasonthe, in an attempt to ensure that she does not suspect that love may exist in the world. Only the young page Rosélio is allowed in her presence.

Prologue – Le rêve d'Isoline
The opera opens on a coast with lemon trees, their branches covered – by magic – with flowers and fruit. A golden galley approaches – the boat of Oberon, king of the elves, in disguise as Eros, en route to Cythère, with happy loving couples as passengers. Princess Isoline sees all this... Oberon then conjures a vision of the handsome young Prince Isolin, son of the Emperor of Credizon, richly dressed, who falls at Isoline's feet. But this was all just a dream...

Sur la tour
Captive in her dark castle room, Isoline recalls her dream. Titania, the godmother of Isoline promises to protect the princess against the plans of Oberon. Oberon's magic brings Isolin to her side and each declares their love.

La vérité sur le mariage
Oberon next makes the walls of the turret room collapse, and Isoline and Isolin fly off on a golden dragon – despite the despairing cries of her surveillants. However, Titania brings the lovers down – to a sad land where the queen is so ugly that all mirrors are banned, rivers and lakes are drained and all the local maidens weep.

Le pays sans miroirs
Oberon appears as a holy man, and proposes that Isolin should marry his fiancée Isoline. Delighted by this, Isolin goes off with the disguised Oberon to arrange the ceremony. Titania, herself disguised as an old beggar, makes Isoline believe that she has become ugly, which drives her to despair. When Isolin returns, Isoline, thinking he wants to marry her through pity, repulses him.

La Chimère d'or et de neige
Despairing, the young man draws his dagger to stab himself, but Isoline sees her true reflection in the dagger's blade, and responds once more to his ardour.

Le joyeux pays
However, the marriage ceremony is interrupted when the army of Queen Amalasonthe appears, to prevent the union of Isoline and Isolin.

Au bord de l'étang
So the stage is set for battle: Isolin and his 1,000 soldiers against Amalasonthe's army; Oberon is convinced that Isolin's side will triumph. Oberon then finds Titania asleep and reflects on his feelings for her, but their duet fails to heal their rift.

La forêt de Brocéliande
A few hours later in the forest of Brocéliande Titania gets the fairies (in a choral ballet) to use their charms to hold captive the prince Isolin. But in battle the forces of Isolin are victorious and Queen Amalasonthe surrenders – Isoline may become his wife.

Le soir des noces
The marriage ceremony goes ahead, but Titania has ensured that while Isoline is transformed into a boy on her first kiss from Isolin, the groom is transformed into a girl.

L'embarquement pour Cythère
So 'Isolin' and 'Isoline' can set sail for Cythère. Oberon and Titania are reconciled and Titania is persuaded to join everyone for the voyage to Cythère.
