= Louis Beydts =

French composer and conductor

Louis Beydts (/bets/) was a French composer, music critic and theatre director, born 29 June 1895 in Bordeaux and died on 15 August 1953 at Caudéran in Gironde.

== Life and career ==
His father was a wine-merchant who played the flute, while his mother played the piano. At 16, having finished his school studies, he went into the family business. Having learnt the piano and tried some composition, at 18 he studied harmony, counterpoint and fugue with Julien Fernand Vaubourgoin, director of the Bordeaux Conservatoire, although Beydts never enrolled there. Through Vaubourgoin he gained a strict classical harmonic technique. Beydts also studied with André Messager to whom he paid homage in Moineau with a variation on the theme of the swing duet.

During the First World War Beydts was mobilized, only returning to civilian life in 1919, picking up his much-appreciated studies with Vaubourgoin until 1924. His parents were supportive of their son's musical ambitions.

In Paris he had a work for voice and orchestra Le Sommeil performed at the Concerts Lamoureux in 1926. In 1927 Adieu was performed by the Concerts Colonne, and Le Promenoir des deux amants at the Concerts Pasdeloup.

His first attempt at operetta was Le Bourreau des cœurs (unperformed), but he went on to write others: Moineau(originally entitled La Noce, staged at the Théâtre Marigny on 13 March 1931) with limited success. In November 1931 la S A D M P (la Société anonyme des messieurs prudents) with words by Sacha Guitry, was seen at the Théâtre de la Madeleine, and on 22 December of the same year le Club les Canards mandarins was performed in Monte Carlo. Another collaboration with Guitry Voyage de Tchong-Li was staged in March 1932. Beydts was among the last generation of composers to conserve and develop the traditional French opérette.

Beydts composed A l’aimable Sabine and mélodies such as La lyre et les amours (cycle, 1938), Jeux Rustiques (Joachim du Bellay, 1936), Mélancolie, Quatre Odelettes, 1929; Quatre Humoresques, 1932; Quatre Chansons, 1935 (Chansons pour les oiseaux (Heyse): La colombe poignardée; Le petit pigeon blue; L'oiseau bleu; Le petit serin en cage); le Coeur inutile, as well as a suite for 14 instruments. He was one of seven composers to contribute to an oratorio Jeanne d'Arc (co-sponsored by the Association Jeune-France), first performed on 28 April 1942 conducted by Charles Munch at the Société des Concerts du Conservatoire. His D’ombre et de soleil was first performed on 2 February 1947 in a Conservatoire concert, with soloist Ninon Vallin and Beydts himself conducting.

He composed incidental music for a Paris production of Numance by Cervantes, as several other plays at the Comédie-Française during and after the war, which led to further commissions for incidental music from other Paris theatres.

In April and May 1941 he acted as artistic director to the recording of Pelléas et Mélisande conducted by Roger Désormière. He finished his career as Director of the Opéra-Comique in Paris from 1952 to 1953, with the 50th anniversary production of Pelléas et Mélisande and the first French production of The Rake's Progress. An important figure in Parisian musical life, Beydts was a close friend of the cellist Pierre Fournier. He died at Caudéran in Gironde. On the day of his funeral, he was honoured in a simple and moving ceremony at the Opéra-Comique after the curtain for Act I of The Rake's Progress - the curtain rose to reveal the cast and management of the theatre facing the house, and Louis Musy, spoke a brief obituary, requested a minute's silence after which the curtain fell slowly.

His musical style has been described as traditional, classical, clear, melodic and of indisputable elegance. His favourite composers were Fauré, followed by Debussy, Gounod, Messager, Ravel and Pierné. Another writer acknowledged his "natural spontaneous melodic style strengthened by a fertile invention" and that he showed an "unerring and resourceful instinct" in setting French verse; his settings of Tristan Klingsor, Tristan L'Hermite and Henri de Regnier "constantly bewitch by their delicate melodic tracery, their suppleness and freedom of line".

His conducting may be heard on the recording of Messager's Isoline and his own La Lyre et les Amours with Pierre Bernac, and A travers Paris.

== Filmography ==
=== Composer ===
- La Kermesse héroïque (1935)
- Pasteur (1935)
- Le Comédien (1948)
- Le Colonel Chabert (1943)
- L'Affaire du courrier de Lyon (1937)
- Woman of Malacca (1937)
- The Silent Battle (1937)
- La Loi du nord (1939)
- The Phantom Baron (1943)
- Deburau (1951)
- La Malibran (1944)
- Les Miracles n'ont lieu qu'une fois (1951)
- Parade en 7 nuits (1941)
- The Paris Waltz (1950)
- Colonel Pontcarral (1942)
- La Dame de Malacca (1937)
- La Piste du nord (1939)
- Monsieur de Falindor (1947)
- Le Diable boiteux (1948, tr. The Lame Devil)
- The Secret of Mayerling (1949)
- Prelude to Glory (1950)
- The Beautiful Image (1951)
- Miracles Only Happen Once (1951)
- The Call of Destiny (1953)

=== Musician ===
- Louise (1939)
- La Malibran (1944)
- La Vie de bohème (1945)
- La Valse de Paris (1950)

=== Actor ===
- La Malibran (1944)

== Discography ==
- La Société Anonyme des Messieurs Prudents - Isabelle Druet, mezzo-soprano (Elle); Jérôme Billy, ténor (Henri Morin); Mathias Vidal, ténor (le gros commerçant); Dominique Coté, baryton (le grand industriel); Thomas Dolié, baryton (le baron), Orchestre régional Avignon-Provence, dir. Samuel Jean (2017, Klarthe) OCLC 1013905847
- Louis Beydts: Mélodies & Songs, Tristan Raës, Cyrille Dubois, CD APPARTE - March 2024
