= Coups de roulis =

Opérette

- Opérette by André Messager
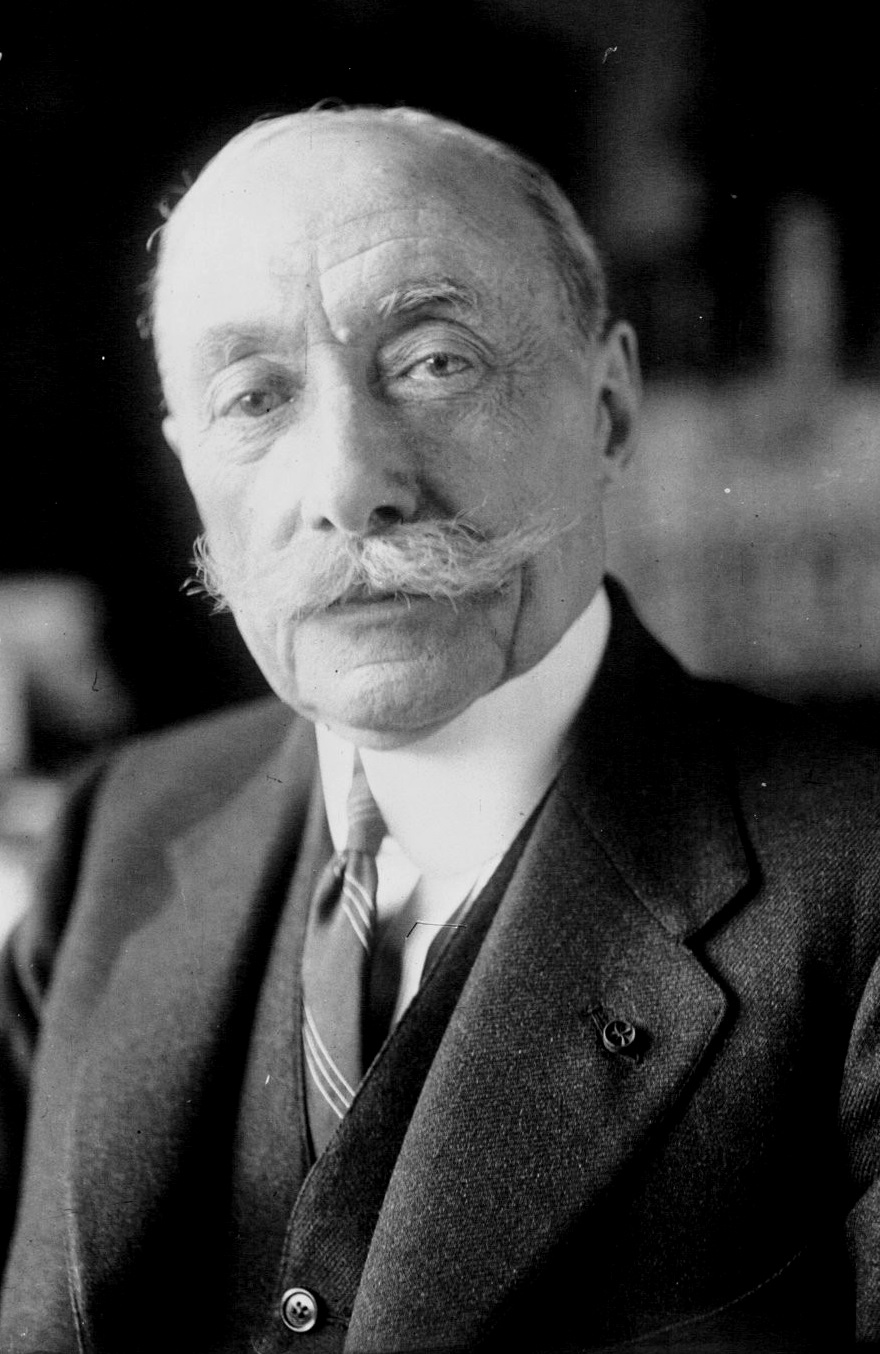
- André Messager in 1921
- Librettist: Albert Willemetz
- Language: French
- Based on: Coups de roulis by Maurice Larrouy
- Premiere: 29 September 1928; Théâtre Marigny, Paris

Coups de roulis is an opérette in three acts with music by André Messager and a French libretto by Albert Willemetz, based on the 1925 novel by Maurice Larrouy. It was Messager's last work, written during remissions of illness, and although from the pen of a 74 year-old shows no signs of old-age or suffering.

== Performance history ==
Coups de roulis was first performed at Théâtre Marigny, Paris, on 29 September 1928, and was still running a few days after the composer's death.

A recording for French radio in 1978 with Isabel Garcisanz, Michel Roux, Jean-Christophe Benoît and Michel Philippe was also broadcast on BBC Radio 3. It was performed in the Metz opera house during the 2000-01 season, and a revival by Les Frivolités Parisiennes was mounted in Tourcoing before transferring to Paris in 2023.

== Roles ==
Role	Voice type	Premiere Cast, 29 September 1928 (Conductor: -)
Puy Pradal	baritone	Raimu
Gerville, ship's captain	bass	Pierre Magnier
Kermao, lieutenant	baritone	Robert Burnier
Pinson, matelot ordonnance	baritone	Gustave Nellson
Béatrice	soprano	Marcelle Denya
Sola Myrrhis	soprano	Maguy Warna
Vice Admiral of Saint Mesmin		Marcel Carpentier
Bellory, steward		Jean Deiss
Muriac, doctor		D'ary Brissac
Haubourdin, lieutenant		Guillet
Blangy, ship's engineer		Antony
Subervielle, officer		Valette
Le Kerec, quarter-master		Ed. Rousseau

== Synopsis ==
Act I : On board the battleship 'Montesquieu'
With Christmas imminent, the crew of the battleship 'Montesquieu' are hoping to spend their leave with families or girlfriends before going on manoeuvres in the Mediterranean. The deputy Puy-Pradal is leading a parliamentary commission of enquiry on board. Arriving on 20 December, he upsets everyone's plans and all on board are forced to prepare to set sail. Puy-Pradal arrives with his secretary – his daughter Béatrice – and once on board he displays his complete ignorance of marine law, and commits endless blunders. Béatrice meanwhile is courted by Gerville, the commander of the 'Montesquieu' and by the young and handsome lieutenant Kermao.

Act II : Cairo
During the stop at Cairo, Puy-Pradal throws a grand official party with dancing, during which the actress Sola Myrrhis appears. She is determined to become a member of the Comédie Française and in Puy-Pradal sees someone who can help her, and seduces him without much trouble. Alone together Béatrice and Kermao swear their love. The officer goes to find his commander to ask him to intercede with Puy-Pradal to allow him to marry his daughter. Gerville knows all too well that his feelings have no chance against those of Kermao but Puy-Pradal won't hear of anyone other than Gerville becoming his son-in-law. Puy-Pradal is falling for Sola Myrrhis; he entrusts his daughter to Gerville and interrupts his mission so as to accompany the young artist on her Egyptian tour, planning to rejoin the 'Montesquieu' later on.

Act III : On board the 'Montesquieu'
After three months of honeymoon and travel, Puy-Pradal and Sola re-embark on the 'Montesquieu'. Béatrice is angry about her father's liaison and tries to find someone to open her father's eyes to what he is doing. Kermao agrees but is surprised by Puy-Pradal with Sola; the deputy breaks off with the actress. Béatrice complains that Kermao was embracing Sola and refuses to speak to him. Gerville reconciles the lovers and manages to convince Puy-Pradal to give his consent to their marriage. Sola Myrrhis will join the Comédie Française, as the deputy has found her talent to be absolutely right. Puy-Pradal, however, learns that he will be part of a ministerial re-shuffle.

== Film ==
A 1931 Jean de la Cour film of the piece was released in May 1932 with Edith Manet (Béatrice), Max Dearly (Puy-Pradal), Lucienne Herval (Sola Myrrhis), Pierre Magnier (Gerville), Roger Bourdin (Kermao), Germaine Roger (Betty), Robert Darthez (Bellory), Hubert Daix (the doctor), Henri Levêque (Haubourdin), Pierre Clarel (Pinson), Robert Brummel, Jacques Erwin (officers).

== Recordings ==
Various excerpts were recorded in 1928 and 1932 including some by members of the original cast.

Coups de Roulis was recorded in full and released in October 1963 with the Chorale Lyrique and Orchestre Lyrique de l'O.R.T.F. conducted by Marcel Cariven, with Lina Dachary, Claudine Collart, Gaston Rey, Aimé Doniat, Jacques Pruvost and René Lenoty. A further recording with soloists, the Chorus and Orchestra of Les Frivolités Parisiennes conducted by Alexandra Cravero was released by B Records in 2024, with a new orchestration.
