= Marc Berthomieu =

French composer, director and writer

Marc Berthomieu was a French composer, director and writer born on 9 December 1906 in Marseille. He died on 11 March 1991 in Paris at age 84.

== Biography ==
Berthomieu studied at Paris Conservatory. He founded the Paris-15th district Conservatory in 1962.

He was awarded a D.M. prize by SACEM, Maurice Ivan Prize by SACD, France Academy Prize, Leo Delibes Prize, Prix Ernest Reyer Prize, Roman Prize, and the Jean Coctot Prize.

== Major works ==
Sources:

- Robert Macaire
- Sacha
- La Belle traversée
- La Tendre Alyne
- 5 Nuances
- Arcadie
