= The Pirates of Penzance =

1879 comic opera by Gilbert & Sullivan

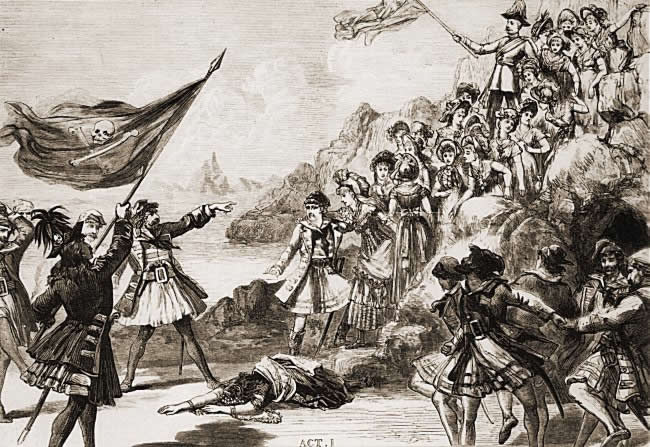
Drawing of the Act I finale

The Pirates of Penzance; or, The Slave of Duty is a comic opera in two acts, with music by Arthur Sullivan and libretto by W. S. Gilbert. Its official premiere was at the Fifth Avenue Theatre in New York City on 31 December 1879, where it was well received by both audiences and critics. Its London debut was on 3 April 1880, at the Opera Comique, where it ran for 363 performances.

The story concerns Frederic, who, having completed his 21st year, is released from his apprenticeship to a band of tender-hearted pirates. He meets the daughters of the incompetent Major-General Stanley, including Mabel, and the two young people fall instantly in love. Frederic learns, however, that he was born on 29 February, and so, technically, he has a birthday only once each leap year. His indenture specifies that he remain apprenticed to the pirates until his "twenty-first birthday", meaning that he must serve for another 63 years. (Note: This figure assumes that Gilbert was ignoring the fact that there was no leap year in 1900. Otherwise, the action of the opera takes place in 1873 instead of 1877, and the figure would be 67 years. See Bradley (1996), p. 244) Bound by his own sense of duty to honour his bond with the pirates, Frederic's only solace is that Mabel agrees to wait for him faithfully. The pirates' maid-of-all-work, Ruth, eventually reveals a fact that saves the day.

The Pirates of Penzance was the fifth Gilbert and Sullivan collaboration and introduced the much-parodied "Major-General's Song". It has been one of the most frequently played Gilbert and Sullivan operas, along with The Mikado and H.M.S. Pinafore. Pirates was performed for over a century by the D'Oyly Carte Opera Company in Britain until the copyrights expired and by many other opera companies and repertory companies worldwide.

Modernized productions include Joseph Papp's 1981 Broadway production, which ran for 787 performances, won the Tony Award for Best Revival and the Drama Desk Award for Outstanding Musical and spawned many imitations; the production was further adapted as a film in 1983. Another Broadway adaptation by Rupert Holmes was presented in 2025 as Pirates! The Penzance Musical.

== Background ==
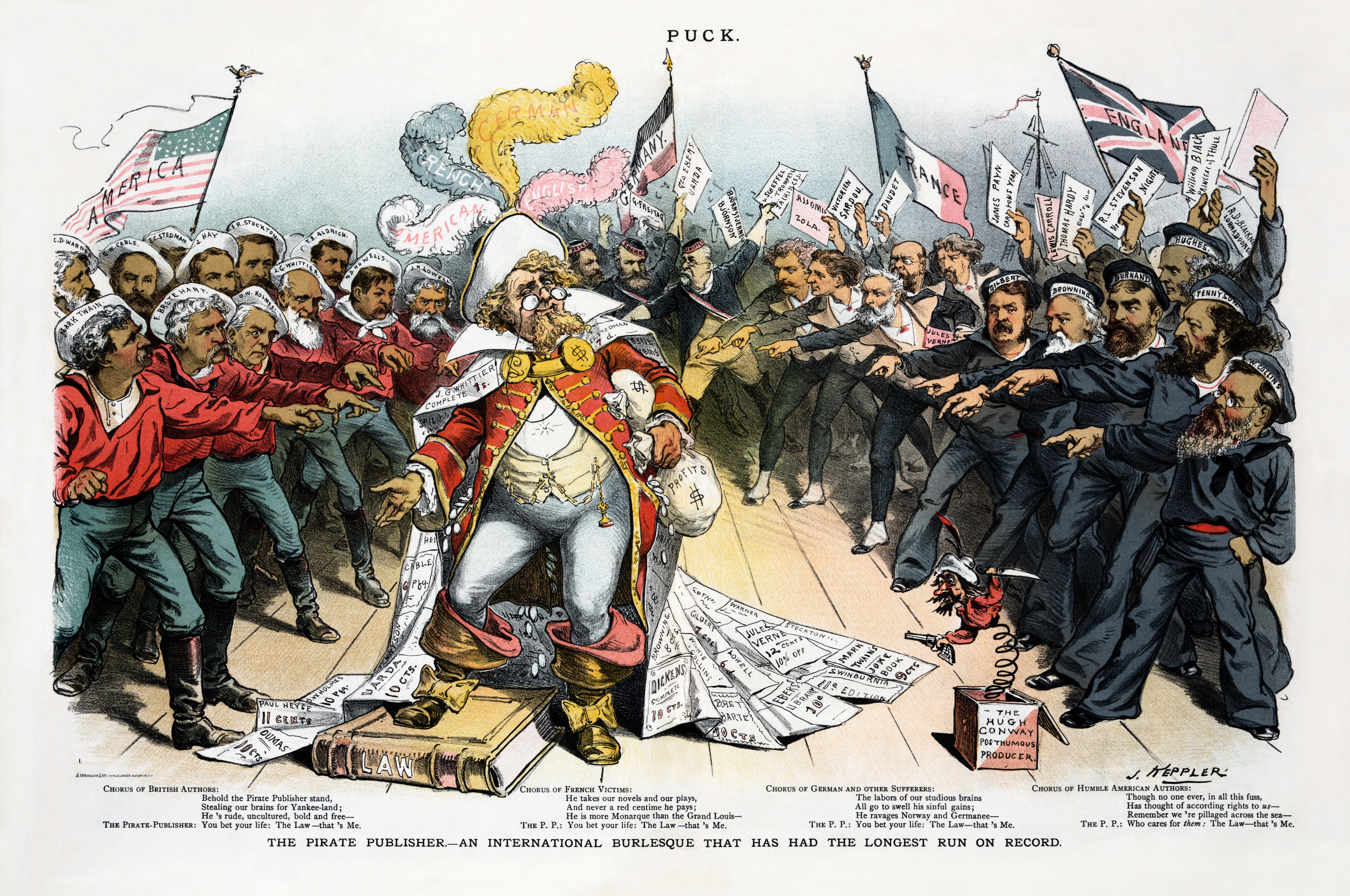
The Pirate Publisher – An International Burlesque that has the Longest Run on Record, from Puck, 1886: Gilbert is seen as one of the British authors whose works are stolen by the pirate publisher.

The Pirates of Penzance was the only Gilbert and Sullivan opera to have its official premiere in the United States. At the time, American law offered no copyright protection to foreigners. After the pair's previous opera, H.M.S. Pinafore, achieved success in London in 1878, approximately 150 American companies quickly mounted unauthorised productions that often took considerable liberties with the text and paid no royalties to the creators. Gilbert and Sullivan hoped to forestall further "copyright piracy" by mounting the first production of their next opera in America, before others could copy it, and by delaying publication of the score and libretto. They succeeded in keeping for themselves the direct profits of the first American production of The Pirates of Penzance by opening the production themselves on Broadway, prior to the London production, and they also operated profitable US touring companies of Pirates and Pinafore. However, Gilbert, Sullivan, and their producer, Richard D'Oyly Carte, failed in their efforts, over the next decade, to control the American performance copyrights to Pirates and their other operas.

Fiction and plays about pirates were ubiquitous in the 19th century. Walter Scott's The Pirate (1822) and James Fenimore Cooper's The Red Rover were key sources for the romanticised, dashing pirate image and the idea of repentant pirates. Both Gilbert and Sullivan had parodied these ideas early in their careers. Sullivan had written a comic opera, The Contrabandista, in 1867, about a hapless British tourist who is captured by bandits and forced to become their chief. Gilbert had written several comic works that involved pirates or bandits. In Gilbert's 1876 opera Princess Toto, the title character is eager to be captured by a brigand chief. Gilbert had translated Jacques Offenbach's operetta Les brigands, in 1871. As in Les brigands, The Pirates of Penzance absurdly treats stealing as a professional career path, with apprentices and tools of the trade such as the crowbar and life preserver.

=== Genesis ===
While Pinafore was running strongly at the Opera Comique in London, Gilbert was eager to get started on his and Sullivan's next opera, and he began working on the libretto in December 1878. He re-used several elements of his 1870 one-act piece, Our Island Home, which had introduced a pirate "chief", Captain Bang. Bang was mistakenly apprenticed to a pirate band as a child by his deaf nursemaid. Also, Bang, like Frederic in The Pirates of Penzance, had never seen a woman before and felt a keen sense of duty, as an apprenticed pirate, until the passage of his 21st birthday freed him from his articles of indenture. Bernard Shaw believed that Gilbert drew on ideas in Les brigands for his new libretto, including the businesslike bandits and the bumbling police. Gilbert and Sullivan also inserted into Act II an idea they first considered for a one-act opera parody in 1876 about burglars meeting police, while their conflict escapes the notice of the oblivious father of a large family of girls. As in Pinafore, "there was a wordful self-descriptive set-piece for Stanley ["The Major-General's Song"], introducing himself much as Sir Joseph Porter had done ... a lugubrious comic number for the Sergeant of Police ... a song of confession for Ruth, the successor [to] Little Buttercup", romantic material for Frederic and Mabel, and "ensemble and chorus music in turn pretty, parodic and atmospheric."

Gilbert, Sullivan and Carte met by 24 April 1879 to make plans for a production of Pinafore and the new opera in America. Carte travelled to New York in the summer of 1879 and made arrangements with theatre manager John T. Ford (Note: Ford had been one of the few managers who had paid Gilbert and Sullivan any kind of fee for performing Pinafore in America, and his reward for a small gesture was great.) to present, at the Fifth Avenue Theatre, the authorised productions. He then returned to London. Meanwhile, once Pinafore became a hit in London, the author, composer and producer had the financial resources to produce future shows themselves, and they executed a plan to free themselves from their financial backers in the "Comedy Opera Company", which eventually succeeded. (Note: Sullivan gave notice to the directors of the Comedy Opera Company in early July 1879 that he, Gilbert and Carte would not be renewing their contract to produce Pinafore with them and that he would withdraw his music from the Comedy Opera Company on 31 July. This followed a closure of the Opera Comique for repairs that Gilbert, Sullivan and Carte used to give them an argument that the original run of the production had "closed". Sullivan wrote to a former producer, John Hollingshead of the Gaiety Theatre, saying: "You once settled a precedent for me which may just at present be of great importance to me. I asked you for the band parts of the Merry Wives of Windsor ... and [you] said, 'They are yours, as our run is over....' Now will you please let me have them, and the parts of Thespis also at once. I am detaining the parts of Pinafore, so that the directors shall not take them away from the Comique tomorrow, and I base my claim on the precedent you set." The Comedy Opera Company directors engaged another theatre to play a rival production of Pinafore, but they had no scenery. On 31 July, they sent a group of thugs to the Opera Comique to seize the scenery and props during the evening performance of Pinafore. Stagehands and cast members managed to ward off their backstage attackers and protect the scenery. The police arrived to restore order, and the show continued. The matter was eventually settled in court, where a judge ruled in Carte's favour about two years later.) Carte formed a new partnership with Gilbert and Sullivan to divide profits equally among themselves after the expenses of each of their shows.

In November 1879, Gilbert, Sullivan and Carte sailed to America with a company of singing actors, to play both Pinafore and the new opera, including J. H. Ryley as Sir Joseph, Blanche Roosevelt as Josephine, Alice Barnett as Little Buttercup, Furneaux Cook as Dick Deadeye, Hugh Talbot as Ralph Rackstraw and Jessie Bond as Cousin Hebe, some of whom had been in the Pinafore cast in London. To these, he added some American singers, including Signor Brocolini as Captain Corcoran. Alfred Cellier came to assist Sullivan, while his brother François Cellier remained in London to conduct Pinafore there. Gilbert and Sullivan cast talented actors who were not well-known stars and did not command high fees. They then tailored their operas to the particular abilities of these performers. The skill with which Gilbert and Sullivan used their performers had an effect on the audience: as critic Herman Klein wrote, "we secretly marvelled at the naturalness and ease with which [the Gilbertian quips and absurdities] were said and done. For until then no living soul had seen upon the stage such weird, eccentric, yet intensely human beings .... [They] conjured into existence a hitherto unknown comic world of sheer delight." Gilbert acted as stage director for his own plays and operas. He sought naturalism in acting, which was unusual at the time, just as he strove for realistic visual elements. He deprecated self-conscious interaction with the audience and insisted on a style of portrayal in which the characters were never aware of their own absurdity but were coherent internal wholes. Sullivan conducted the music rehearsals.

Poster for the copyright performance at Paignton

Sullivan had sketched out the music for Pirates in England. When he arrived in New York, however, he found that he had left the sketches for Act I behind, and he had to reconstruct the first act from memory, or compose new numbers. Gilbert told a correspondent many years later that Sullivan was unable to recall his setting of the entrance of the women's chorus, so they substituted the chorus "Climbing over rocky mountain" from their earlier opera, Thespis. Sullivan's manuscript for Pirates contains pages removed from a Thespis score, with the vocal parts of this chorus altered from their original arrangement as a four-part chorus. Some scholars (e.g. Tillett and Spencer, 2000) have suggested that Gilbert and Sullivan had planned all along to re-use "Climbing over rocky mountain," and perhaps other parts of Thespis. They argue that Sullivan's having brought the unpublished Thespis score to New York, when there were no plans to revive Thespis, might not have been accidental. In any case, on 10 December 1879, Sullivan wrote a letter to his mother about the new opera, upon which he was hard at work in New York. "I think it will be a great success, for it is exquisitely funny, and the music is strikingly tuneful and catching." As was his usual practice in his operas, Sullivan left the overture for the last moment, often sketching it out and entrusting completion of "the details" to an assistant, in this case the company's music director, Alfred Cellier.

Pinafore opened in New York on 1 December 1879 and ran for the rest of December. After a reasonably strong first week, audiences quickly fell off, since most New Yorkers had already seen local productions of Pinafore. In the meantime, Gilbert and Sullivan raced to complete and rehearse The Pirates of Penzance. The work's title is a multi-layered joke. On the one hand, Penzance was a docile seaside resort in 1879, and not the place where one would expect to encounter pirates. (Note: From medieval times and in later centuries, however, Penzance was subject to frequent raiding by Turkish pirates) On the other hand, the title was also a jab at the theatrical "pirates" who had staged unlicensed productions of H.M.S. Pinafore in America. To secure the British copyright, (Note: Performances had to be given in Britain before publication in order to secure copyright.) a D'Oyly Carte touring company gave a perfunctory copyright performance of Pirates the afternoon before the New York premiere, at the Royal Bijou Theatre in Paignton, Devon, organised by Helen Lenoir, who would later marry Richard D'Oyly Carte. The cast, which was performing Pinafore in the evenings in Torquay, received some of the music for Pirates only two days beforehand. Having had only one rehearsal, they travelled to nearby Paignton for the matinee, where they read their parts from scripts carried onto the stage, making do with whatever costumes they had on hand.

=== Original production and aftermath ===
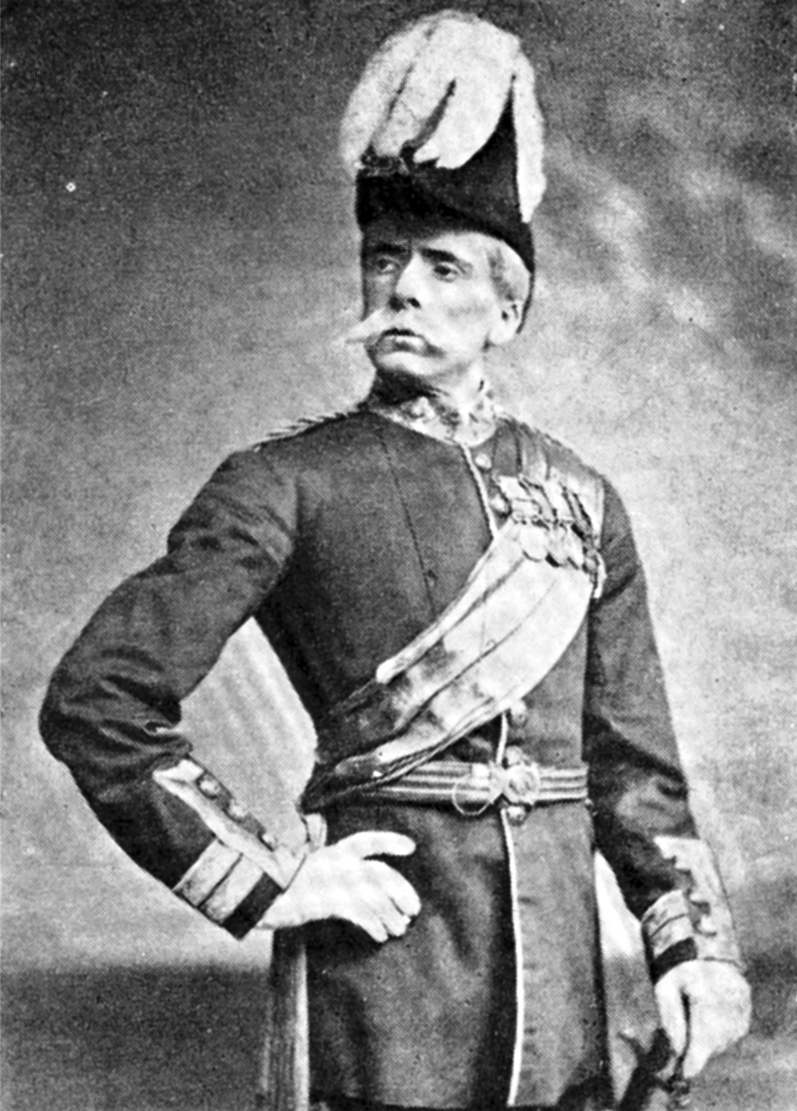
George Grossmith as General Stanley, wearing Wolseley's trademark moustache

Pirates premiered on 31 December 1879 in New York and was an immediate hit. On 2 January 1880, Sullivan wrote, in another letter to his mother from New York, "The libretto is ingenious, clever, wonderfully funny in parts, and sometimes brilliant in dialogue – beautifully written for music, as is all Gilbert does. ... The music is infinitely superior in every way to the Pinafore – 'tunier' and more developed, of a higher class altogether. I think that in time it will be very popular." Shortly thereafter, Carte sent three touring companies around the United States East Coast and Midwest, playing Pirates and Pinafore. Sullivan's prediction was correct. After a strong run in New York and several American tours, Pirates opened in London on 3 April 1880, running for 363 performances there. It remains one of the most popular G&S works. The London sets were designed by John O'Connor.

The critics' notices were generally excellent in both New York and London. The character of Major-General Stanley was widely taken to be a caricature of the popular general Sir Garnet Wolseley. The biographer Michael Ainger, however, doubts that Gilbert intended a caricature of Wolseley, identifying instead General Henry Turner, uncle of Gilbert's wife, as the pattern for the "modern Major-General". Gilbert disliked Turner, who, unlike the progressive Wolseley, was of the old school of officers. Nevertheless, in the original London production, George Grossmith imitated Wolseley's mannerisms and appearance, particularly his large moustache, and the audience recognised the allusion. Wolseley himself, according to his biographer, took no offence at the caricature and sometimes sang "I am the very model of a modern Major-General" for the private amusement of his family and friends.

== Roles ==
- Major-General Stanley (comic baritone)
- The Pirate King (bass-baritone)
- Samuel, his Lieutenant (baritone)
- Frederic, the Pirate Apprentice (tenor)
- Sergeant of Police (bass)

General Stanley's daughters

- Mabel (soprano)
- Edith (mezzo-soprano)
- Kate (mezzo-soprano)
- Isabel (speaking role)

- Ruth, a Piratical Maid of all work (contralto)
- Chorus of Pirates, Police and General Stanley's Daughters

== Synopsis ==
Marion Hood: "Yes, 'tis Mabel!"

=== Act I ===
On the coast of Cornwall, during Queen Victoria's reign, Frederic celebrates the completion of his twenty-first year and the end of his apprenticeship to a gentlemanly band of pirates ("Pour, oh pour the pirate sherry"). The pirates' maid of all work, Ruth, appears and reveals that, as Frederic's nursemaid long ago, she made a mistake "through being hard of hearing": mishearing Frederic's father's instructions, she apprenticed him to a pirate, instead of to a ship's pilot ("When Frederic was a little lad").

Frederic has never seen any woman other than Ruth, and he believes her to be beautiful. The pirates know better and suggest that Frederic take Ruth with him when he returns to civilisation. Frederic announces that, although it pains him, so strong is his sense of duty that, once free from his apprenticeship, he will be forced to devote himself to the pirates' extermination. He also points out that they are not successful pirates: since they are all orphans, they allow their prey to go free if they too are orphans. Frederic notes that word of this has got about, so captured ships' companies routinely claim to be orphans. Frederic invites the pirates to give up piracy and go with him, so that he need not destroy them, but the Pirate King says that, contrasted with respectability, piracy is comparatively honest ("Oh! better far to live and die"). The pirates depart, leaving Frederic and Ruth. Frederic sees a group of beautiful young girls approaching the pirate lair, and realises that Ruth misled him about her appearance ("Oh false one! You have deceived me!"). Sending Ruth away, Frederic hides before the girls arrive.

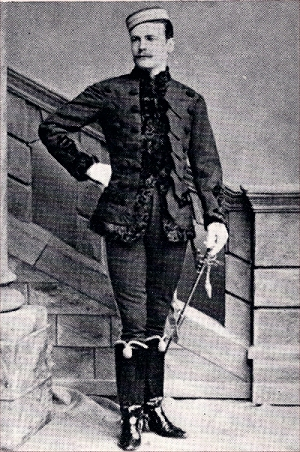
George Power, the original Frederic in London

The girls burst exuberantly upon the secluded spot ("Climbing over rocky mountain"). Frederic reveals himself ("Stop, ladies, pray!"), startling them. He appeals to them to help him reform ("Oh! is there not one maiden breast?"). The girls are fascinated by him, but all reject him, except one: Mabel responds to his plea, chiding her sisters for their lack of charity ("Oh sisters deaf to pity's name for shame!"). She offers Frederic her pity ("Poor wand'ring one"), and the two quickly fall in love. The other girls discuss whether to eavesdrop or to leave the new couple alone ("What ought we to do?"), deciding to "talk about the weather," although they steal glances at the affectionate couple ("How beautifully blue the sky").

Frederic warns the young ladies that his old associates will soon return ("Stay, we must not lose our senses"), but before they can flee, the pirates arrive and capture the girls, intending to marry them ("Here's a first rate opportunity"). Mabel warns the pirates that the girls' father is a Major-General ("Hold, monsters!"), who soon arrives and introduces himself ("I am the very model of a modern Major-General"). He appeals to the pirates not to take his daughters, leaving him to face his old age alone. Having heard of the famous Pirates of Penzance, he pretends that he is an orphan to elicit their sympathy ("Oh, men of dark and dismal fate"). The soft-hearted pirates release the girls ("Hail, Poetry!"), making Major-General Stanley and his daughters honorary members of their band ("Pray observe the magnanimity").

=== Act II ===
The Major-General sits in a ruined chapel on his estate, surrounded by his daughters. His conscience is tortured by the lie that he told the pirates, and the girls attempt to console him ("Oh dry the glist'ning tear"). The Sergeant of Police and his corps arrive to announce their readiness to arrest the pirates ("When the foeman bares his steel"). The girls loudly express their admiration of the police for facing likely slaughter by fierce and merciless foes. The police are unnerved by this and leave reluctantly.

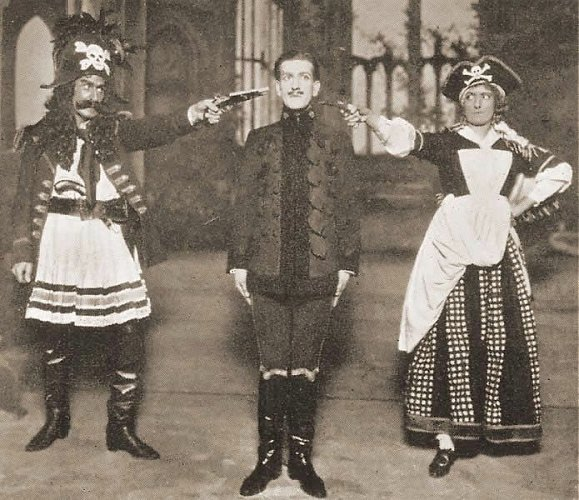
"Have mercy on us!"

Left alone, Frederic, who is to lead the police, reflects on his opportunity to atone for a life of piracy ("Now for the pirates' lair"), at which point he encounters Ruth and the Pirate King. They have realised that Frederic's apprenticeship was worded so as to bind him to them until his twenty-first birthday – and, because that birthday happens to be on 29 February (in a leap year), it means that technically only five birthdays have passed ("When you had left our pirate fold"), and he will not reach his twenty-first birthday until he is in his eighties. Frederic is convinced by this logic and agrees to rejoin the pirates. He then sees it as his duty to inform the Pirate King of the Major-General's deception. The outraged outlaw declares that the pirates' "revenge will be swift and terrible" ("Away, away, my heart's on fire").

Frederic meets Mabel ("All is prepared"), and she pleads with him to stay ("Stay Frederic, stay"), but he feels bound by his duty to the pirates until his 21st birthday – in 1940. They agree to be faithful to each other until then, though to Mabel "It seems so long" ("Oh, here is love, and here is truth"); Frederic departs. Mabel steels herself ("No, I'll be brave") and tells the police that they must go alone to face the pirates. The police muse that an outlaw might be just like any other man, and it is a shame to deprive him of "that liberty which is so dear to all" ("When a felon's not engaged in his employment"). The police hide on hearing the approach of the pirates ("A rollicking band of pirates we"), who have stolen onto the estate, intending to take revenge for the Major-General's lie ("With cat-like tread").

Just then, Major-General Stanley appears, sleepless with guilt, and the pirates also hide ("Hush, hush! not a word"), while the Major-General listens to the soothing breeze ("Sighing softly to the river"). The girls come looking for him. The pirates leap out to seize them, and the Pirate King urges the captured Major-General to prepare for death. The police rush to their defence but are easily defeated. The Sergeant has one stratagem left: he demands that the pirates yield "in Queen Victoria's name"; the pirates, overcome with loyalty to their Queen, do so. Ruth appears and reveals that the pirates are "all noblemen who have gone wrong". The Major-General is impressed by this and all is forgiven. Frederic and Mabel are reunited, and the Major-General is happy to marry his daughters to the noble ex-pirates after all ("Poor Wand'ring Ones" (reprise)).

== Musical numbers ==
Excerpts from the 1920 His Master's Voice recording of the opera, conducted by George W. Byng
Oh, better far to live and die ... Oh, false one, you have deceived me

Oh, sisters, deaf to pity's name ... Poor wand'ring one

When the foeman bares his steel

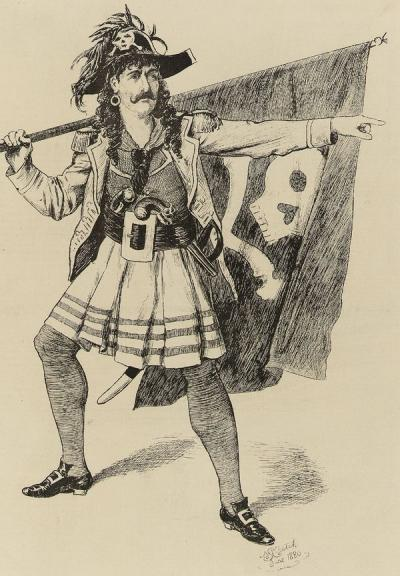
Drawing of Richard Temple as the Pirate King

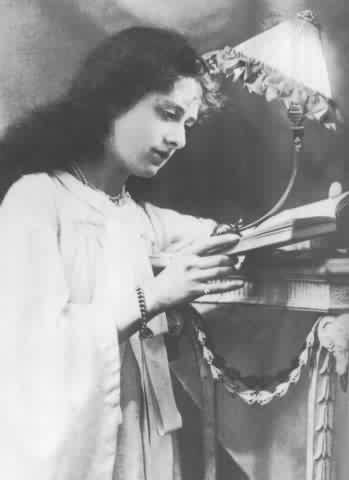
Isabel Jay as Mabel

Pirate King Henry Lytton denounces Major-General C. H. Workman.

- Overture (includes "With cat-like tread", "Ah, leave me not to pine", "Pray observe the magnanimity", "When you had left our pirate fold", "Climbing over rocky mountain", and "How beautifully blue the sky")

Act I

- 1. "Pour, oh pour, the pirate sherry" (Samuel and Chorus of Pirates)
- 2. "When Fred'ric was a little lad" (Ruth)
- 3. "Oh, better far to live and die" (Pirate King and Chorus of Pirates)
- 4. "Oh! false one, you have deceiv'd me" (Frederic and Ruth)
- 5. "Climbing over rocky mountain" (Chorus of Girls)
- 6. "Stop, ladies, pray" (Edith, Kate, Frederic, and Chorus of Girls)
- 7. "Oh, is there not one maiden breast?" (Frederic and Chorus of Girls)
- 8. "Poor wand'ring one" (Mabel and Chorus of Girls)
- 9. "What ought we to do?" (Edith, Kate, and Chorus of Girls)
- 10. "How beautifully blue the sky" (Mabel, Frederic, and Chorus of Girls)
- 11. "Stay, we must not lose our senses" ... "Here's a first-rate opportunity to get married with impunity" (Frederic and Chorus of Girls and Pirates)
- 12. "Hold, monsters" (Mabel, Major-General, Samuel, and Chorus)
- 13. "I am the very model of a modern Major-General" (Major-General and Chorus)
- 14. Finale Act I (Mabel, Kate, Edith, Ruth, Frederic, Samuel, King, Major-General, and Chorus)
  - "Oh, men of dark and dismal fate"
  - "I'm telling a terrible story"
  - "Hail, Poetry"
  - "Oh, happy day, with joyous glee"
  - "Pray observe the magnanimity" (reprise of "Here's a first-rate opportunity")

Act II

- 15. "Oh, dry the glist'ning tear" (Mabel and Chorus of Girls)
- 16. "Then, Frederic, let your escort lion-hearted" (Frederic and Major-General)
- 17. "When the foeman bares his steel" (Mabel, Edith, Sergeant, and Chorus of Policemen and Girls)
- 18. "Now for the pirates' lair!" (Frederic, Ruth, and King)
- 19. "When you had left our pirate fold" [The "paradox" trio] (Ruth, Frederic, and King)
- 20. "Away, away! My heart's on fire!" (Ruth, Frederic, and King)
- 21. "All is prepar'd; your gallant crew await you" (Mabel and Frederic)
- 22. "Stay, Fred'ric, stay" ... "Ah, leave me not to pine" ... "Oh, here is love, and here is truth" (Mabel and Frederic)
- 23. "No, I'll be brave" ... "Though in body and in mind" (Reprise of "When the foeman bares his steel") (Mabel, Sergeant, and Chorus of Police)
- 23a. "Sergeant, approach!" (Mabel, Sergeant of Police, and Chorus of Police)
- 24. "When a felon's not engaged in his employment" (Sergeant and Chorus of Police)
- 25. "A rollicking band of pirates we" (Sergeant and Chorus of Pirates and Police)
- 26. "With cat-like tread, upon our prey we steal" (Samuel and Chorus of Pirates and Police)
- 27. "Hush, hush, not a word!" (Frederic, King, Major-General, and Chorus of Police and Pirates)
- 28. Finale, Act II (Ensemble)
  - "Sighing softly to the river"
  - "Now what is this, and what is that?"
  - "You/We triumph now"
  - "Away with them, and place them at the bar!"
  - "Poor wandering ones!"

== Critical reception ==
The notices from critics were generally excellent in both New York and London in 1880. In New York, the Herald and the Tribune both dedicated considerable space to their reviews. The Herald took the view that "the new work is in every respect superior to the Pinafore, the text more humorous, the music more elegant and more elaborate." The Tribune called it "a brilliant and complete success", commenting, "The humor of the Pirates is richer, but more recondite. It demands a closer attention to the words [but] there are great stores of wit and drollery ... which will well repay exploration. ... The music is fresh, bright, elegant and merry, and much of it belongs to a higher order of art than the most popular of the tunes of Pinafore." The New York Times also praised the work, writing, "it would be impossible for a confirmed misanthrope to refrain from merriment over it", though the paper doubted if Pirates could repeat the prodigious success of Pinafore.

After the London premiere, the critical consensus, led by the theatrical newspaper The Era, was that the new work marked a distinct advance on Gilbert and Sullivan's earlier works. The Pall Mall Gazette said, "Of Mr. Sullivan's music we must speak in detail on some other occasion. Suffice it for the present to say that in the new style which he has marked out for himself it is the best he has written." The Graphic wrote:

That no composer can meet the requirements of Mr. Gilbert like Mr. Sullivan, and vice versa, is a fact universally admitted. One might fancy that verse and music were of simultaneous growth, so closely and firmly are they interwoven. Away from this consideration, the score of The Pirates of Penzance is one upon which Mr. Sullivan must have bestowed earnest consideration, for independently of its constant flow of melody, it is written throughout for voices and instruments with infinite care, and the issue is a cabinet miniature of exquisitely defined proportions. ... That the Pirates is a clear advance upon its precursors, from Trial by Jury to H.M.S. Pinafore, cannot be denied; it contains more variety, marked character, careful workmanship, and is in fact a more finished artistic achievement … a brilliant success.

There were a few dissenting comments: The Manchester Guardian thought both author and composer had drawn on the works of their predecessors: "Mr. Gilbert ... seems to have borrowed an idea from Sheridan's The Critic; Mr. Sullivan's music is sprightly, tuneful and full of 'go', although it is certainly lacking in originality." The Sporting Times noted, "It doesn't appear to have struck any of the critics yet that the central idea in The Pirates of Penzance is taken from Our Island Home, which was played by the German Reeds some ten years ago." The Times thought Gilbert's wit outran his dramatic invention, and Sullivan's music for the new work was not quite as good as his score for The Sorcerer, which the Times critic called a masterpiece.

== Musical analysis ==
The overture to The Pirates of Penzance was composed by Sullivan and his musical assistant Alfred Cellier. It follows the pattern of most Savoy opera overtures: a lively opening (the melody of "With cat-like tread"), a slow middle section ("Ah, leave me not to pine alone"), and a concluding allegro in a compressed sonata form, in which the themes of "How beautifully blue the sky" and "A paradox, a paradox" are combined.

=== Parody ===
The score parodies several composers, most conspicuously Verdi. "Come, friends, who plough the sea" and "You triumph now" are burlesques of Il trovatore, and one of the best-known choral passages from the finale to Act I, "Hail Poetry", is, according to the Sullivan scholar, Arthur Jacobs, a burlesque of the prayer scene, "La Vergine degli Angeli", in Verdi's La forza del destino. However, another musicologist, Nicholas Temperley, writes, "The choral outburst 'Hail, Poetry' in The Pirates of Penzance would need very little alteration to turn it into a Mozart string quartet." Another well-known parody number from the work is the song for coloratura, "Poor wand'ring one", which is generally thought to burlesque Gounod's waltz-songs, though the music critic of The Times called it "mock-Donizetti". In a scene in Act II, Mabel addresses the police, who chant their response in the manner of an Anglican church service.

Sullivan even managed to parody two composers at once. The critic Rodney Milnes describes the Major-General's Act II song, "Sighing softly to the river", "as plainly inspired by – and indeed worthy of – Sullivan's hero Schubert", and Amanda Holden speaks of the song's "Schubertian water-rippling accompaniment", but adds that it simultaneously spoofs Verdi's Il trovatore, with the soloist unaware of a concealed male chorus singing behind him.

=== Patter, counterpoint, and vocal writing ===
Major-General's Song
George Baker sings the "I am the very model of a modern Major-General", conducted by George W. Byng (1920)

Writing about patter songs, Shaw, in his capacity as a music critic, praised "the time-honored lilt which Sir Arthur Sullivan, following the example of Mozart and Rossini, chose for the lists of accomplishments of the Major-General in The Pirates or the Colonel in Patience."

This opera contains two well-known examples of Sullivan's characteristic combination of two seemingly disparate melodies. Jacobs suggests that Berlioz's La damnation de Faust, a great favourite in Sullivan's formative years, may have been the model for Sullivan's trademark contrapuntal mingling of the rapid prattle of the women's chorus in Act I ("How beautifully blue the sky") in 2/4 time with the lovers' duet in waltz time. Jacobs writes that "the whole number [shifts] with Schubertian ease from B to G and back again." In Act II, a double chorus combines the policemen's dogged tune, "When the foeman bares his steel" and the soaring line for the women, "Go, ye heroes, go to glory". In adapting the four-part chorus "Climbing over rocky mountain" from Thespis for re-use in Pirates, Sullivan took less trouble: he wrote only a single vocal line, suitable for soprano voices. Despite this, the number ends with another example of Sullivan's counterpoint, with the chorus singing the second melody of the piece ("Let us gaily tread the measure") while the orchestra plays the first ("Climbing over rocky mountain").

Sullivan set a particular vocal challenge for the soprano who portrays Mabel. The Sullivan scholar Gervase Hughes wrote, "Mabel ... must be a coloratura because of 'Poor wand'ring one!', yet 'Dear father, why leave your bed' demands steady beauty of tone throughout the octave F to F, and 'Ah, leave me not to pine' goes a third lower still." In The Music of Arthur Sullivan (1959), Hughes quoted four extracts from Pirates, saying that if hearing each out of context one might attribute it to Schubert, Mendelssohn, Gounod or Bizet respectively, "yet on learning the truth one would kick oneself for not having recognised Sullivan's touch in all four." Hughes concluded by quoting the introductory bars of "When a felon's not engaged in his employment", adding, "There could never be any doubt as to who wrote that, and it is as English as our wonderful police themselves."

== Versions ==
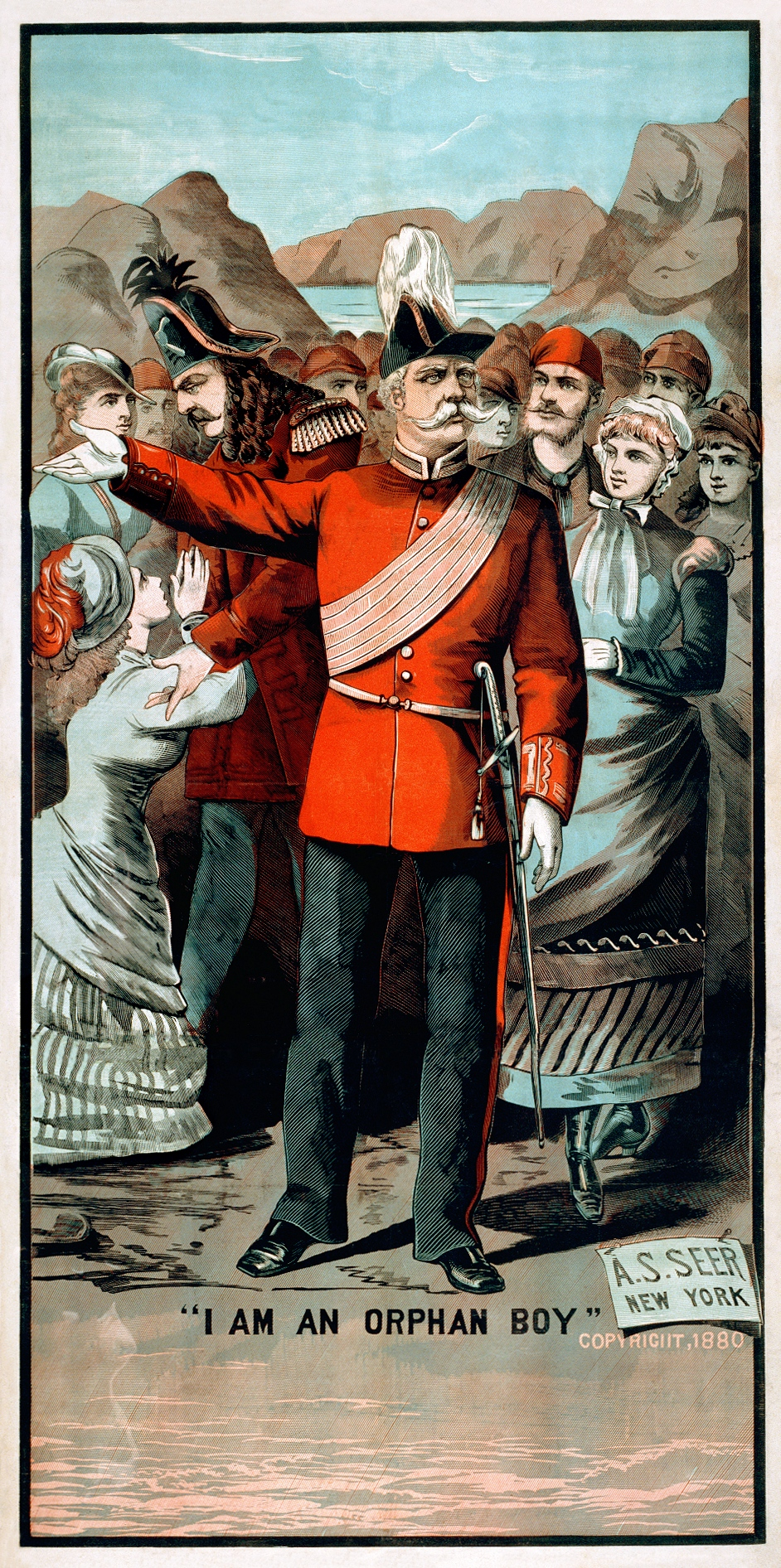
1880 poster

Because the work was premiered in three different places (the Paignton performance and the full productions in New York and London), there are more variations in the early libretto and score of The Pirates of Penzance than in other Gilbert and Sullivan works. Songs sent from New York to the D'Oyly Carte touring company in England for the Paignton premiere were then altered or omitted during Broadway rehearsals. Gilbert and Sullivan trimmed the work for the London premiere, and Gilbert made further alterations up to and including the 1908 Savoy revival. For example, early versions depicted the Pirate King as the servant of the pirate band, and the words of the opening chorus were, "Pour, O King, the pirate sherry". In the original New York production the revelation by Ruth that the pirates are "all noblemen who have gone wrong" prompted the following exchange (recalling a famous passage in H.M.S. Pinafore):

GENERAL, POLICE & GIRLS:	What, all noblemen?
KING & PIRATES:	Yes, all noblemen!
GENERAL, POLICE & GIRLS:	What, all?
KING:	Well, nearly all!

ALL:	... They are nearly all noblemen who have gone wrong. Then give three cheers, both loud and strong, For the twenty noblemen who have gone wrong...

In the original London production, this exchange was shortened to the following:

GIRLS:	Oh spare them! They are all noblemen who have gone wrong.
GENERAL:	What, all noblemen?
KING:	Yes, all noblemen!
GENERAL:	What, all?
KING:	Well, nearly all!

Gilbert deleted the exchange in the 1900 revival, and the Chappell vocal score was revised accordingly. For the 1908 revival Gilbert had the pirates yielding "in good King Edward's name". Despite Helen Carte's repeated urging, Gilbert did not prepare an authorised version of the libretti of the Savoy operas.

In its 1989 production, the D'Oyly Carte Opera Company restored one of the original versions of the finale, which finishes with a variation of "I am the very model of a modern major-general", rather than with the customary reprise of "Poor wand'ring one", but in later revivals, it reverted to the more familiar text.

== Subsequent production history ==
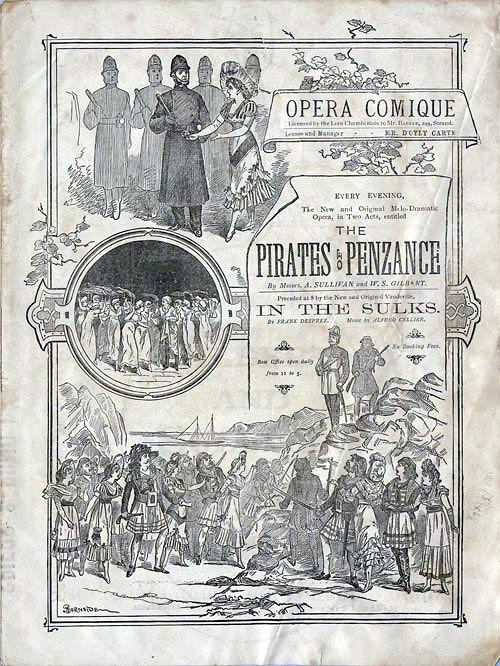
1881 programme cover

The Pirates of Penzance has been one of Gilbert and Sullivan's most popular comic operas. After its unique triple opening in 1879–80, it was revived in London at the Savoy Theatre in 1888 and in 1900, and for the Savoy's repertory season of 1908–09. In the British provinces, the D'Oyly Carte Opera Company toured it almost continuously from 1880 to 1884, and again in 1888. It re-entered the D'Oyly Carte touring repertory in 1893 and was never again absent until the company's closure in 1982. New costumes were designed by Percy Anderson in 1919 and George Sheringham in 1929 (who also executed a new Act I set). Peter Goffin created a new touring set in 1957.

In America, after the New York opening on New Year's Eve, 1879, Richard D'Oyly Carte launched four companies that covered the United States on tours that lasted through the following summer. Gilbert and Sullivan themselves trained each of the touring companies through January and early February 1880, and each company's first performance – whether it was in Philadelphia, Newark, or Buffalo – was conducted by the composer. In Australia, its first authorised performance was on 19 March 1881 at the Theatre Royal, Sydney, produced by J. C. Williamson. There was still no international copyright law in 1880, and the first unauthorised New York production was given by the Boston Ideal Opera Company at Booth's Theatre in September of that year. The opera premiered in a German translation by Richard Genée and Camillo Walzel (Die Piraten) in Austria at the Theater an der Wien on 1 March 1889, and in Düsseldorf, Germany, on 1 December 1936. The first non-D'Oyly Carte professional production in a country that had been subject to Gilbert's copyright (other than Williamsons' authorised productions) was in Stratford, Ontario, Canada, in September 1961, as the copyright expired. In 1979, the Torbay branch of the Gilbert and Sullivan Society presented a centenary tribute to the world premiere performance of Pirates in Paignton, with a production at the Palace Avenue Theatre (situated a few metres from the former Bijou Theatre).

New York has seen over forty major revivals since the premiere. One of these, produced and directed by Winthrop Ames in 1926 at the Plymouth Theatre, ran for 128 performances and gained good notices. A brief 1952 Broadway staging starring Martyn Green, earned Lehman Engel a Tony Award as conductor. Repertory companies that have mounted Pirates numerous times Off-Broadway and on tour in the US have included the American Savoyards (1953–67), the Light Opera of Manhattan (1968–89) and the New York Gilbert and Sullivan Players (1976–present). Professional and amateur productions of Pirates continue with frequency, including at the International Gilbert and Sullivan Festival. The Chicago Lyric Opera and English National Opera each also staged the work in 2004. In 2007 New York City Opera mounted a new production. In 2013, Scottish Opera produced a British touring production co-produced by the trustees of the D'Oyly Carte Opera Company. Richard Suart played Major-General Stanley and Nicholas Sharratt played Frederic.

The following table shows the history of the D'Oyly Carte productions in Gilbert's lifetime (excluding tours):

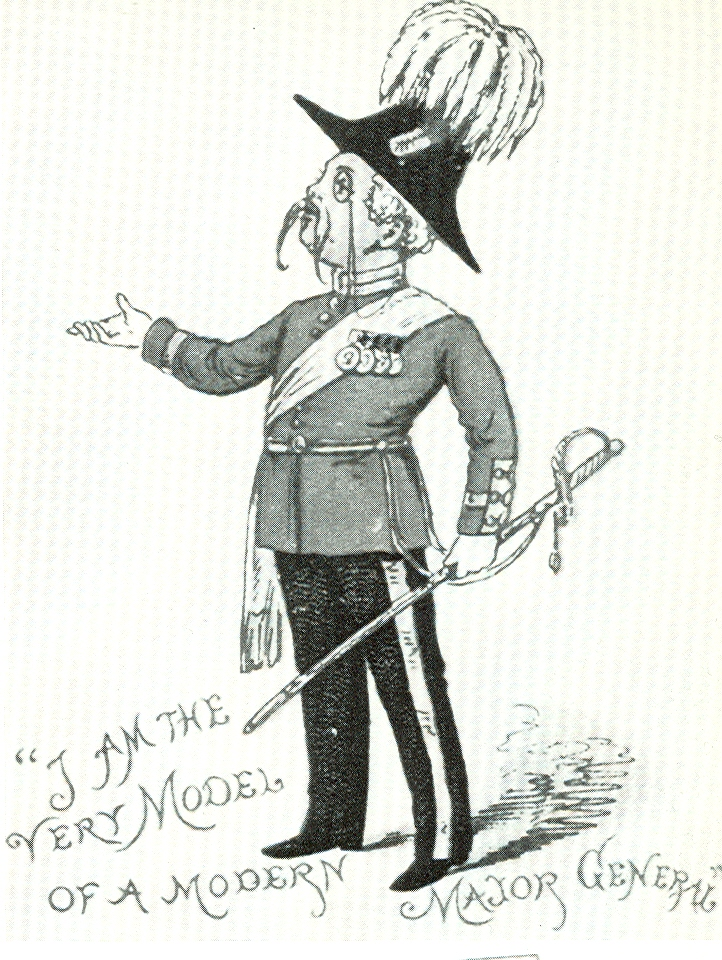
Drawing from programme of children's Pirates, 1884

Theatre	Opening date	Closing date	Perfs.	Details
Bijou Theatre, Paignton	30 December 1879	30 December 1879	1	English copyright performance.
Fifth Avenue Theatre, New York	31 December 1879	6 March 1880	100	Original run in New York. The company toured the Eastern seaboard between 8 March and 15 May. Three other touring companies were launched in January and February 1880.
Fifth Avenue Theatre, New York	17 May 1880	5 June 1880	100	Original run in New York. The company toured the Eastern seaboard between 8 March and 15 May. Three other touring companies were launched in January and February 1880.
Opera Comique	3 April 1880	2 April 1881	363	Original London run.
Savoy Theatre	23 December 1884	14 February 1885	37	Children's Pirates – series of matinées with a juvenile cast.
Savoy Theatre	17 March 1888	6 June 1888	80	First professional revival.
Savoy Theatre	30 June 1900	5 November 1900	127	Second professional revival.
Savoy Theatre	1 December 1908	27 March 1909	43	Second Savoy repertory season; played with five other operas. (Closing date shown is of the entire season.)

=== Papp's Pirates ===
Smith, Ronstadt and Kline at the Delacorte Theatre

In 1980, Joseph Papp and the Public Theater of New York City produced a new version of Pirates, directed by Wilford Leach and choreographed by Graciela Daniele, at the Delacorte Theatre in Central Park, as a Shakespeare in the Park summer event. Musical direction and arrangements were by William Elliott. The show played for 10 previews and 35 performances. It then transferred to Broadway, opening on 8 January 1981 for a run of 20 previews and 787 regular performances at the Uris and Minskoff Theatres, the longest run of any Gilbert and Sullivan production in history. This take on Pirates earned enthusiastic reviews and seven Tony Award nominations, winning three, including the award for Best Revival and for Leach as director. It was also nominated for eight Drama Desk Awards, winning five, including Outstanding Musical and director.

Compared with traditional productions of the opera, Papp's Pirates featured more swashbuckling pirates, a more musical comedy-style of singing and broader humour. It did not significantly change the libretto, but the new orchestration and arrangements changed keys, lengthened dance music and made other minor changes in the score. Two songs, the "Matter Patter" trio from Ruddigore and "Sorry her lot" from H.M.S. Pinafore were interpolated into the show. The production restored Gilbert and Sullivan's 1879 New York ending, with a reprise of the Major-General's song in the Act II finale. Linda Ronstadt starred as Mabel, Rex Smith as Frederic, Kevin Kline as the Pirate King, Patricia Routledge as Ruth (replaced by Estelle Parsons for the Broadway transfer), George Rose as the Major-General, and Tony Azito as the Sergeant of Police. Kline won a Tony Award for his performance. Smith won a Theatre World Award, and Kline and Azito won Drama Desk Awards. Notable replacements during the Broadway run included Karla DeVito, Maureen McGovern and Pam Dawber as Mabel; Robby Benson, Patrick Cassidy and Peter Noone as Frederic; Treat Williams, Gary Sandy, James Belushi and Wally Kurth as the Pirate King; David Garrison as the Sergeant; George S. Irving as the Major-General; and Kaye Ballard as Ruth. The Los Angeles cast of the production featured Barry Bostwick as the Pirate King, Jo Anne Worley as Ruth, Clive Revill as the Major-General, Dawber as Mabel, Paxton Whitehead as the Sergeant, Caroline Peyton as Edith and Andy Gibb as Frederic.

The production opened at the Theatre Royal, Drury Lane, London, on 26 May 1982, to generally warm reviews, for a run of 601 performances, earning an Olivier Award nomination as Outstanding Musical and another for Tim Curry as the Pirate King. Among the cast were George Cole and Ronald Fraser as the Major-General; Pamela Stephenson as Mabel; Michael Praed and Noone as Frederic; Curry, Timothy Bentinck, Oliver Tobias and Paul Nicholas as the Pirate King; Chris Langham as the Sergeant; Annie Ross as Ruth; Bonnie Langford as Kate; and Louise Gold as Isabel. An Australian production opened in Melbourne in January 1984, starring Jon English as the Pirate King, Simon Gallaher as Frederic, June Bronhill as Ruth, David Atkins as the Sergeant and Marina Prior as Mabel. Tours followed. Gallaher's Essgee Entertainment version of Pirates was inspired by the Papp version. The Papp version also inspired foreign-language productions in Germany and elsewhere in Europe. The Papp production was turned into a film in 1983, with the original Broadway principal cast reprising their roles, except that Angela Lansbury played Ruth. The minor roles used British actors miming to their Broadway counterparts. The film has been shown occasionally on television. Another film based loosely on the opera and inspired by the success of the Papp version, The Pirate Movie, was released during the Broadway run.

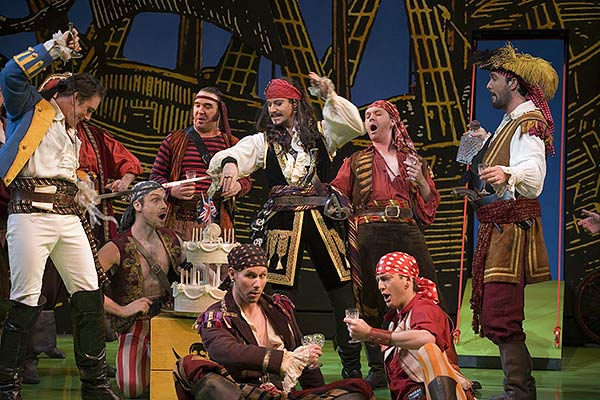
Opera Australia's 2007 touring production of Pirates, with Anthony Warlow as the Pirate King

The Papp production design has been widely imitated, even where traditional orchestration and the standard score are used. Ian Bradley wrote:

[Papp's version] has been regularly revived on both sides of the Atlantic. ... No other production has had as much lasting impact or influence. ... It also helped to promote G&S in places where it has been little performed and bring it to the attention of a much wider and younger audience.

An unlicensed 1982 production was enjoined from transferring to London in a lawsuit. One at the Savoy Theatre in 2004, presented by Raymond Gubbay, used a new musical arrangement to avoid Papp's copyright. Modern productions have combined design elements borrowed from the film franchise Pirates of the Caribbean with aspects of the Papp production. From 2006 to 2007 one such Opera Australia production toured Australia starring Anthony Warlow as the Pirate King. A 1999 UK touring production received this critique: "No doubt when Papp first staged this show in New York and London it had some quality of cheek or chutzpah or pizzazz or irony or something that accounted for its success. But all that's left now ... is a crass Broadway-style musical arrangement ... and the worst kind of smutty send-up of a historic piece of art."

=== 2025 musical version ===
A Roundabout Theatre Company adaptation, Pirates! The Penzance Musical, began previews on Broadway at the Todd Haimes Theatre on 4 April 2025, opened on 24 April and ran through 27 July 2025, for 21 previews and 109 regular performances. It starred David Hyde Pierce as Gilbert/Major General Stanley; Ramin Karimloo as the Pirate King, Jinkx Monsoon as Ruth, Nicholas Barasch as Frederic, Samantha Williams as Mabel and Preston Truman Boyd as Sullivan/Sergeant of Police. Scott Ellis directed, with choreography by Warren Carlyle. Designs were by David Rockwell (sets), Linda Cho (costumes), Donald Holder (lighting) and Mikaal Sulaiman (sound). A concert of this concept staged in October 2022 by Roundabout at the same theatre starred Pierce and Karimloo, with Colton Ryan as Frederic.

Rupert Holmes adapted the libretto with a New Orleans setting. New orchestrations, with styles including French Quarter jazz, blues, Dixieland, boogie-woogie, soft-shoe, calypso, ragtime and rumba, were by Joseph Joubert and Daryl Waters. The overture and four songs were cut, and additions included a passage to the tune of "Good Morrow, Good Mother" (from Iolanthe); a jazz entr'acte (adapted from H.M.S. Pinafore); "The Nightmare Song" (adapted from Iolanthe); "Alone and Yet Alive" (adapted from The Mikado); and the Act 2 finale was adapted from Pinafore. Many lyrics were rewritten; music from act 1 was rearranged to create a new number, "We're Sashayin' Through the Old French Quarter"; and extra dance music was added. The roles of Samuel, Edith, Kate and Isabel were eliminated. In a prologue, Gilbert and Sullivan explain that, in their tour of America, they have so loved New Orleans that they have set the show in that city for the audience at the Theatre of the Renaissance. The show then supposedly unfolds at that venue. Despite rewritten dialogue, the story hews closely to the original plot, but the denouement is changed from the revelation that the pirates are aristocrats to a realization that America is a diverse nation of immigrants.

Most reviews were positive. The critic for Variety wrote that "it is easy enough to put aside almost all quibbles [with the] adaptation ... because the production is so joyous and well-executed". Pirates! was nominated for the 2025 Tony Award for Best Revival of a Musical and three 2025 Drama League Awards, including Outstanding Revival of a Musical. The show grossed a total of $8,058,516. Further productions of this version have followed.

== Historical casting ==
The following tables show the casts of the principal original productions and D'Oyly Carte Opera Company touring repertory at various times through to the company's 1982 closure, the Papp's Pirates Broadway and West End casts and the 2025 Broadway cast.

Role	Paignton 1879	New York 1879	Opera Comique 1880	Savoy Theatre 1888	Savoy Theatre 1900	Savoy Theatre 1908
Major-General	Richard Mansfield	J. H. Ryley	George Grossmith	George Grossmith	Henry Lytton	Charles H. Workman
Pirate King	Frederick Federici	Sgr. Brocolini	Richard Temple	Richard Temple	Jones Hewson	Henry Lytton
Samuel	G. J. Lackner	Furneaux Cook	George Temple	Richard Cummings	W. H. Leon	Leo Sheffield
James	John Le Hay	role eliminated	role eliminated	role eliminated	role eliminated	
Frederic	Llewellyn Cadwaladr	Hugh Talbot	George Power	J. G. Robertson	Robert Evett	Henry Herbert
Sergeant	Fred Billington	Fred Clifton	Rutland Barrington	Rutland Barrington	Walter Passmore	Rutland Barrington
Mabel	Emilie Petrelli	Blanche Roosevelt	Marion Hood	Geraldine Ulmar	Isabel Jay	Dorothy Court
Edith	Marian May	Jessie Bond	Julia Gwynne	Jessie Bond	Lulu Evans	Jessie Rose
Kate	Lena Monmouth	Rosina Brandram	Lilian La Rue	Nellie Kavanagh	Alice Coleman	Beatrice Boarer
Isabel	Kate Neville	Billie Barlow	Neva Bond	Nellie Lawrence	Agnes Fraser	Ethel Lewis
Ruth	Fanny Harrison	Alice Barnett	Emily Cross	Rosina Brandram	Rosina Brandram	Louie René

Role	D'Oyly Carte 1915 Tour	D'Oyly Carte 1925 Tour	D'Oyly Carte 1935 Tour	D'Oyly Carte 1945 Tour	D'Oyly Carte 1950 Tour	D'Oyly Carte 1958 Tour
Major-General	Henry Lytton	Henry Lytton	Martyn Green	Grahame Clifford	Martyn Green	Peter Pratt
Pirate King	Leicester Tunks	Darrell Fancourt	Darrell Fancourt	Darrell Fancourt	Darrell Fancourt	Donald Adams
Samuel	Frederick Hobbs	Joseph Griffin	Richard Walker	Hilton Layland	Donald Harris	George Cook
Frederic	Dewey Gibson	Charles Goulding	John Dean	John Dean	Leonard Osborn	Thomas Round
Sergeant	Fred Billington	Leo Sheffield	Sydney Granville	Richard Walker	Richard Watson	Kenneth Sandford
Mabel	Elsie McDermid	Elsie Griffin	Kathleen Frances	Helen Roberts	Muriel Harding	Jean Hindmarsh
Edith	Nellie Briercliffe	Eileen Sharp	Marjorie Eyre	Marjorie Eyre	Joan Gillingham	Joyce Wright
Kate	Betty Grylls	Aileen Davies	Maisie Baxter	Ivy Sanders	Joyce Wright	Marian Martin
Isabel	Kitty Twinn	Hilary Davies	Elizabeth Nickell-Lean	Rosalie Dyer	Enid Walsh	Jane Fyffe
Ruth	Bertha Lewis	Bertha Lewis	Dorothy Gill	Ella Halman	Ella Halman	Ann Drummond-Grant

Role	D'Oyly Carte 1968 Tour	D'Oyly Carte 1975 Tour	Broadway 1981	D'Oyly Carte 1981 Tour	West End 1982	Broadway 2025
Major-General	John Reed	James Conroy-Ward	George Rose	Alistair Donkin	George Cole	David Hyde Pierce
Pirate King	Donald Adams	John Ayldon	Kevin Kline	John Ayldon	Tim Curry	Ramin Karimloo
Samuel	Alan Styler	Jon Ellison	Stephan Hanan	Michael Buchan	Sylvester McCoy	role eliminated
Frederic	Philip Potter	Colin Wright	Rex Smith	Meston Reid	Michael Praed	Nicholas Barasch
Sergeant	George Cook	Michael Rayner	Tony Azito	Clive Harre	Chris Langham	Preston Truman Boyd
Mabel	Valerie Masterson	Julia Goss	Linda Ronstadt	Vivian Tierney	Pamela Stephenson	Samantha Williams
Edith	Peggy Ann Jones	Patricia Leonard	Alexandra Korey	Jill Pert	Janet Shaw	role eliminated
Kate	Pauline Wales	Caroline Baker	Marcie Shaw	Helene Witcombe	Bonnie Langford	role eliminated
Isabel	Susan Maisey	Rosalind Griffiths	Wendy Wolfe	Alexandra Hann	Louise Gold	role eliminated
Ruth	Christene Palmer	Lyndsie Holland	Estelle Parsons	Patricia Leonard	Annie Ross	Jinkx Monsoon

== Recordings ==
The Pirates of Penzance has been recorded many times, and the critical consensus is that it has fared well on record. The first complete recording of the score was in 1921, under the direction of Rupert D'Oyly Carte, but with established recording singers rather than D'Oyly Carte Opera Company performers. In 1929, The Gramophone said of a new set with a mainly D'Oyly Carte cast, "This new recording represents the high-water mark so far as Gilbert and Sullivan opera is concerned. In each of the previous Savoy albums there have been occasional lapses which prevented one from awarding them unqualified praise; but with the Pirates it is happily otherwise; from first to last, and in every bar, a simply delightful production." Of later recordings by the D'Oyly Carte Opera Company, the 1968 recording (with complete dialogue) is highly regarded: The online Gilbert and Sullivan Discography says, "This recording is one of the best D'Oyly Carte sets of all time, and certainly the best Pirates", and the Penguin Guide to Opera on Compact Disc also recommends it. So too does the Penguin Guide to Recorded Classical Music, alongside the 1993 Mackerras recording. The opera critic Alan Blyth recommended the D'Oyly Carte recording of 1990: "a performance full of the kind of life that can only come from the experience of stage performances". The online Discography site also mentions the 1981 Papp recording as "excellent", despite its inauthentic 1980 re-orchestrations that "changed some of the timbres so as to appeal to a rock-oriented public".

Of the available commercial videos, the Discography site considers the Brent Walker better than the Papp version. More recent professional productions have been recorded on video by the International Gilbert and Sullivan Festival.

Selected recordings

- 1929 D'Oyly Carte – Conductor: Malcolm Sargent
- 1957 D'Oyly Carte – New Symphony Orchestra of London; Conductor: Isidore Godfrey
- 1961 Sargent/Glyndebourne – Pro Arte Orchestra, Glyndebourne Festival Chorus; Conductor: Sir Malcolm Sargent
- 1968 D'Oyly Carte (with dialogue) – Royal Philharmonic Orchestra; Conductor: Isidore Godfrey
- 1981; 1983 Papp's Pirates (with dialogue) – Director: Wilford Leach; musical director: William Elliott; Choreographer: Graciela Daniele
- 1982 Brent Walker Productions (with dialogue) – Ambrosian Opera Chorus, London Symphony Orchestra; Conductor: Alexander Faris; Stage Director: Michael Geliot
- 1990 New D'Oyly Carte – Conductor: John Pryce-Jones
- 1993 Mackerras/Telarc – Orchestra and Chorus of the Welsh National Opera; Conductor: Sir Charles Mackerras
- 1994 Essgee Entertainment (video adaptation) – Director and Choreographer: Craig Schaefer; Orchestrator and Conductor: Kevin Hocking; Additional Lyrics: Melvyn Morrow

== Cultural impact ==
=== Major-General's Song ===
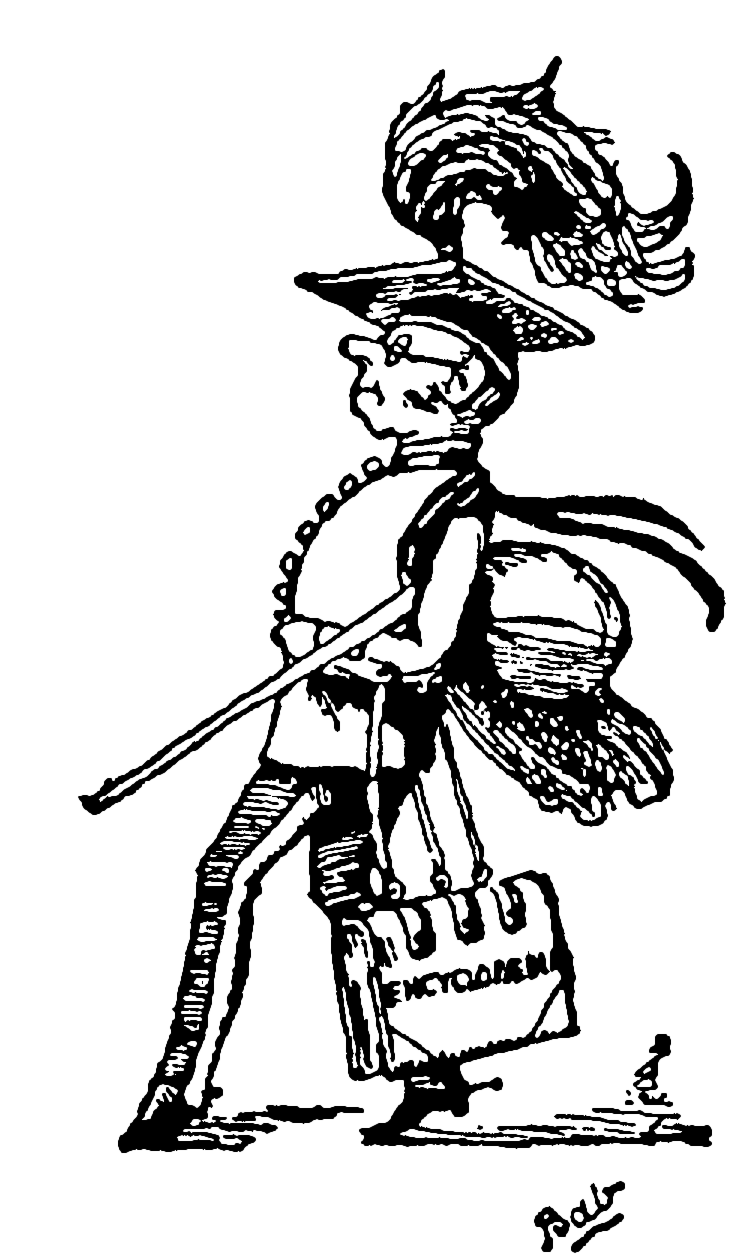
The Major-General carries an encyclopedia in this "Bab" drawing.

Pirates is one of the most frequently referenced works of Gilbert and Sullivan. The Major-General's Song, in particular, is frequently parodied, pastiched and used in advertising. Parody versions have been used in political commentary as well as entertainment media. Its challenging patter has proved interesting to comedians; notable examples include Tom Lehrer's song "The Elements" and David Hyde Pierce's monologue as host of Saturday Night Live. In 2010, comedian Ron Butler released a YouTube pastiche of the song in character as President Barack Obama which, as of May 2025, had garnered more than 1.9 million views.

Pastiche examples include the Animaniacs version, "I am the very model of a cartoon individual", in the episode "H.M.S. Yakko"; the Doctor Who audio "I am the very model of a Gallifreyan buccaneer" in Doctor Who and the Pirates; the Studio 60 on the Sunset Strip version in the episode "The Cold Open" (2006), where the cast performs "We'll be the very model of a modern network TV show"; and the Mass Effect 2 video game version, where the character Mordin Solus sings: "I am the very model of a scientist Salarian".

The song is often used in film and on television, unchanged in many instances, as a character's audition piece, or seen in a "school play" scene. Examples include a VeggieTales episode entitled "The Wonderful World of Auto-Tainment!"; the Frasier episode "Fathers and Sons"; The Simpsons episode "Deep Space Homer"; and the Mad About You episode "Moody Blues", where Paul directs a charity production of Penzance starring his father, Burt, as the Major-General. In The Muppet Show (season 3, episode 4) guest host, comedian Gilda Radner, sings the song with a 7-foot-tall (2.1 m) talking carrot (Parodying the pilot/pirate confusion in Pirates, Radner had requested a 6-foot-tall (1.8 m) talking parrot, but was misheard). In an episode of Home Improvement, Al Borland begins to sing the song when tricked into thinking he is in a soundproof booth. In the Babylon 5 episode "Atonement", Marcus Cole uses the song to drive Dr Stephen Franklin crazy on a long journey to Mars.

Examples of the use of the song in advertising include Martyn Green's pastiche of the song listing all of the varieties of Campbell's Soup and a 2011 Geico commercial in which a couple that wants to save money, but still listen to musicals, finds a roommate, dressed as the Major-General, who awkwardly begins the song while dancing on a coffee table. Gimbels department store had a campaign sung to the tune of the Major-General's Song that began, "We are the very model of a modern big department store." George Washington, in the number "Right Hand Man" from the 2015 musical Hamilton by Lin-Manuel Miranda, refers to himself with irony as "The model of a modern major general", which he rhymes with "men are all". Miranda commented: "I always felt like 'mineral' wasn't the best possible rhyme."

=== Film and television ===
Other film references to Pirates include Kate & Leopold, where there are multiple references, including a scene where Leopold sings "I Am The Very Model of A Modern Major-General" while accompanying himself on the piano; and in Pretty Woman, Edward Lewis (Richard Gere) covers a social gaffe by prostitute Vivian Ward (Julia Roberts), who comments that the opera La traviata was so good that she almost "peed [her] pants", by saying that she had said that she liked it better than The Pirates of Penzance". In Walt Disney's cartoon Mickey, Donald, Goofy: The Three Musketeers (2004), there is a performance of Pirates that becomes the setting for the climactic battle between the Musketeers and Captain Pete. Pirates songs sung in the cartoon are "With cat-like tread", "Poor wand'ring one", "Climbing over rocky mountain" and the Major-General's song. "Poor wand'ring one" was used in the movie An American Tail. The soundtrack of the 1992 film The Hand That Rocks the Cradle includes "Poor Wand'ring One" and "Oh Dry the Glistening Tear". A nonsense pastiche of the Major-General's song in the 2017 film Despicable Me 3, sung by Minions, was termed "amusing" and "the film's finest moment"; it was uploaded to YouTube by Illumination Entertainment as a singalong challenge, which has garnered more than 19 million views as of 2025.

Television references, in addition to those mentioned above, included the series The West Wing, where Pirates and other Gilbert and Sullivan operas are mentioned in several episodes, especially by Deputy Communications Director, Sam Seaborn, who was recording secretary of his school's Gilbert and Sullivan society. In Studio 60 on the Sunset Strip, a poster from Pirates hangs on Matt Albie's office wall. Both TV series were created by Aaron Sorkin. In the pilot episode of the 2008 CTV series Flashpoint, a police officer and his partner sing the policeman's song. In an Assy McGee episode entitled "Pegfinger", Detective Sanchez's wife is a member of a community theatre that performs the opera. In a 1986 episode of the animated television adaptation of The Wind in the Willows entitled A Producer's Lot, several characters put on a production of Pirates. In a 2005 Family Guy episode "Peter's Got Woods", Brian Griffin sings "Sighing Softly", with Peter Griffin's assistance. In a 2012 episode, "Killer Queen", Peter gives a garbled rendition of the Major-General's Song. In the 2009 Criminal Minds episode "The Slave of Duty", Hotch quotes "Oh dry the glist'ning tear". In the 1992 episode "The Understudy" of Clarissa Explains it All, the title character is chosen to understudy Mabel in a school production of Pirates and is unprepared when she must go on; a scene from The Mikado is also heard.

=== Other references ===
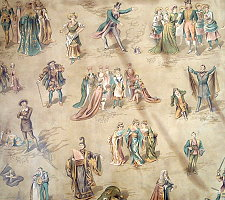
Wallpaper showing characters from Pirates and other Savoy operas

Other notable instances of references to Pirates include a New York Times article on 29 February 1940, memorialising that Frederic was finally out of his indentures. Six years previously, the arms granted to the municipal borough of Penzance in 1934 contain a pirate dressed in Gilbert's original costuming, and Penzance had a rugby team called the Penzance Pirates, which is now called the Cornish Pirates. In 1980, Isaac Asimov wrote a short story called "The Gilbert & Sullivan Mystery" (later retitled "The Year of the Action"), concerning whether the action of Pirates took place on 1 March 1873, or 1 March 1877 (depending on whether Gilbert took into account the fact that 1900 was not a leap year). The plot of Laurie R. King's 2011 novel Pirate King centers on a 1924 silent movie adaptation of The Pirates of Penzance.

The music from the chorus of "With cat-like tread", which begins "Come, friends, who plough the sea," was used in the popular American song, "Hail, Hail, the Gang's All Here." "With cat-like tread" is also part of the soundtrack, along with other Gilbert and Sullivan songs, in the 1981 film, Chariots of Fire, and it was pastiched in the "HMS Yakko" episode of Animaniacs in a song about surfing a whale. In the case Pierson v. Ray, which established the doctrine of qualified immunity for police officers, the United States Supreme Court held that "[a] policeman's lot is not so unhappy that he must choose between being charged with dereliction of duty if he does not arrest when he had probable cause, and being punished with damages if he does." State courts have cited the same song for other purposes: "Where does this extraordinary situation leave the lower... Courts and State Courts in their required effort to apply the decisions of the Supreme Court of the United States...? Like the policeman in Gilbert and Sullivan's The Pirates of Penzance, their 'lot is not a happy one.'"

== Other adaptations ==
Stage

- Di Yam Gazlonim, a Yiddish adaptation of Pirates by Al Grand that continues to be performed in North America. The 2006 production at the National Yiddish Theater Folksbiene was nominated for the 2007 Drama Desk Award for Outstanding Revival. The Montreal Express wrote in 2009, "Grand's adaptation is a delightfully whimsical treatment".
- The Parson's Pirates by Opera della Luna premiered in 1995.
- Pirates! Or, Gilbert and Sullivan Plunder'd (2006), is a musical comedy set on a Caribbean island, involving a voodoo curse that makes the pirates "landsick". It was first presented 1 November 2006 at Goodspeed Opera House in East Haddam, Connecticut, then in 2007 at the Paper Mill Playhouse in Millburn, New Jersey, in 2009 at the Huntington Theatre Company in Boston, Massachusetts, and at The Muny in St. Louis, Missouri, in 2012. Other Gilbert and Sullivan numbers, such as the Nightmare song from Iolanthe are interpolated.
- Pirates of Penzance – The Ballet! premiered in 1991
- Essgee Entertainment produced an adapted version in 1994 in Australia and New Zealand. Their producer, Simon Gallaher (Frederic in the Australian Papp production), produced another adaptation of Pirates that toured Australia from 2001 to 2003
- All-male versions of the opera include a long-running adaptation by Sasha Regan at the Union Theatre in 2009, which transferred to Wilton's Music Hall in London in 2010 and toured in Australia in 2012.

Film and TV

- The Pirate Movie, a 1982 musical romantic comedy film loosely based on the opera.
- The Pirates of Penzance, a 1983 film adaptation of Papp's Broadway production.
- Die Piraten, a German-language version, was premiered on German television in 1968 and starred Arleen Auger as Mabel, Gerd Nienstedt as the Pirate King and Martha Mödl as Ruth, with Franz Marszalek conducting. Mabel falls in love with the Pirate King, among other plot changes. A 2-CD set of the broadcast was issued by Gala Records in 2000.
- Several other television adaptations of the opera have been made, beginning in 1939.

== See also ==
- Our Island Home, one of the sources of the libretto for Pirates

== Sources ==
- Ainger, Michael (2002). Gilbert and Sullivan – A Dual Biography. Oxford: Oxford University Press. ISBN 0-19-514769-3.
- Allen, Reginald (1979). Gilbert and Sullivan in America, The Story of the First D'Oyly Carte Opera Company American Tour. New York: The Pierpont Morgan Library.
- Allen, Reginald (1975). The First Night Gilbert and Sullivan (2nd ed.). Chappell & Co. Ltd. ISBN 0-903443-10-4.
- Bond, Jessie (1930). The Life and Reminiscences of Jessie Bond, the Old Savoyard (as told to Ethel MacGeorge). London: John Lane, The Bodley Head. (Chapters 5 and 6)
- Blyth, Alan (1994). Opera on CD. London: Kyle Cathie. ISBN 1-85626-103-4.
- Bordman, Gerald (1981). American Operetta: From H. M. S. Pinafore to Sweeney Todd. Oxford: Oxford University Press. ISBN 0-19-502869-4.
- Bradley, Ian (1982). The Annotated Gilbert and Sullivan. Harmondsworth, England: Penguin Books. ISBN 0-14-070848-0.
- Bradley, Ian (2005). Oh Joy! Oh Rapture!: The Enduring Phenomenon of Gilbert and Sullivan. Oxford, England: Oxford University Press. ISBN 0-19-516700-7.
- Gänzl, Kurt (1986). The British Musical Theatre—Volume I, 1865–1914. Oxford: Oxford University Press.
- Holden, Amanda (1997). The Penguin Opera Guide. London: Penguin Books. ISBN 014051385X.
- Hughes, Gervase (1959). The Music of Sir Arthur Sullivan. London: Macmillan & Co Ltd.
- Jacobs, Arthur (1986). Arthur Sullivan: A Victorian Musician. Oxford: Oxford University Press. ISBN 0-19-282033-8.
- Lamb, Andrew (Spring 1986). "From Pinafore to Porter: United States–United Kingdom Interactions in Musical Theater, 1879–1929". American Music. 4 (1). University of Illinois Press: 34–49. doi:10.2307/3052183. JSTOR 3052183.
- March, Ivan, ed. (1993). The Penguin Guide to Opera on Compact Discs. Harmondsworth: Penguin Books. ISBN 0-14-046957-5.
- March, Ivan, ed. (2007). The Penguin Guide to Recorded Classical Music. Harmondsworth: Penguin Books. ISBN 978-0-14-103336-5.
- Rees, Terence (1964). Thespis – A Gilbert & Sullivan Enigma. London: Dillon's University Bookshop.
- Rollins, Cyril; R. John Witts (1962). The D'Oyly Carte Opera Company in Gilbert and Sullivan Operas: A Record of Productions, 1875–1961. London: Michael Joseph. Also, five supplements, privately printed
- Shaw, Bernard (1981). Laurence, Dan H. (ed.). Shaw's Music: The Complete Musical Criticism of Bernard Shaw. Vol. 1. London: Max Reinhardt. ISBN 0-370-31270-8.
- Shaw, Bernard (1981). Laurence, Dan H. (ed.). Shaw's Music: The Complete Musical Criticism of Bernard Shaw. Vol. 2. London: Max Reinhardt. ISBN 0-370-31271-6.
- Tillett, Selwyn; Spencer, Roderick (21 September 2002). Forty Years of Thespis Scholarship (PDF). Sullivan Society Festival weekend. Cirencester. Archived from the original on 19 June 2007.
- Williams, Carolyn (2010). Gilbert and Sullivan: Gender, Genre, Parody. New York: Columbia University Press. ISBN 978-0-231-14804-7.
