= Les brigands =

Operetta by Jacques Offenbach

Jacques Offenbach by Nadar, c. 1860s

Les brigands (French pronunciation: [le bʁiɡɑ̃], The Bandits) is an opéra bouffe, or operetta, by Jacques Offenbach to a French libretto by Henri Meilhac and Ludovic Halévy. Meilhac and Halévy's libretto lampoons both serious drama (Schiller's play The Robbers) and opéra comique (Fra Diavolo and Les diamants de la couronne by Auber). The plot is cheerfully amoral in its presentation of theft as a basic principle of society rather than as an aberration. As Falsacappa, the brigand chieftain, notes: "Everybody steals according to their position in society." The piece premiered in Paris in 1869 and has received periodic revivals in France and elsewhere, both in French and in translation.

Les brigands has a more substantial plot than many Offenbach operettas and integrates the songs more completely into the story. The forces of law and order are represented by the bumbling carabinieri, whose exaggerated attire delighted the Parisian audience during the premiere. In addition to policemen, financiers receive satiric treatment. The satire counterpoints lively musical romps and the frequent use of Italian and Spanish rhythms; "Soyez pitoyables" is a true canon, and each act finale is a well-developed whole. A 1983 New York Times article theorized that the music of the piece influenced Bizet in writing Carmen and noted that the librettists for this work supplied Bizet's libretto, but standard studies of Bizet and Offenbach do not mention any such influence.

== Performance history ==
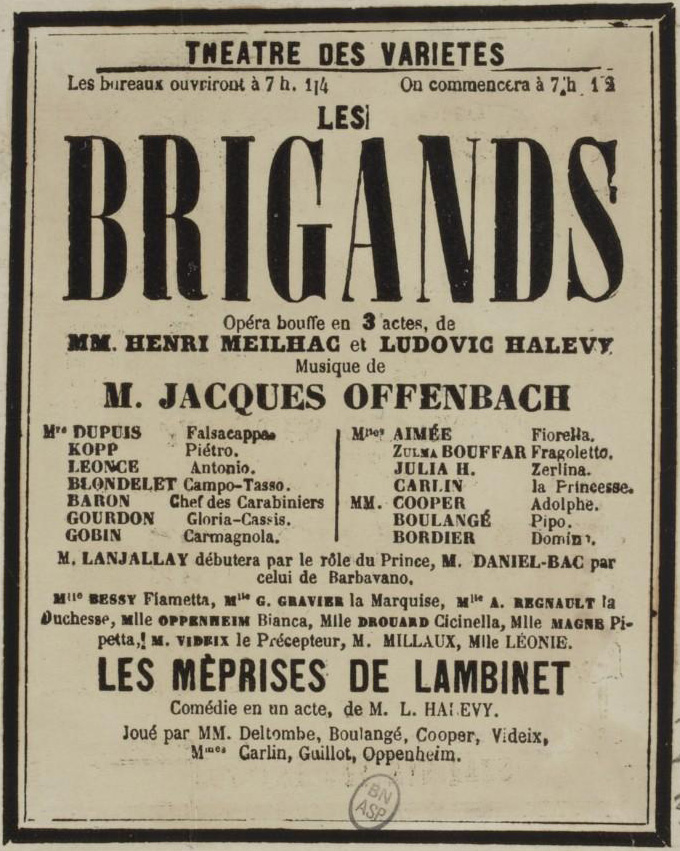
Poster for the first run of Les Brigands

Les brigands was first performed at the Théâtre des Variétés, Paris on 10 December 1869; this version was in three acts. A four-act version was subsequently prepared for a production at the Théâtre de la Gaîté, opening on 25 December 1878. The piece achieved great success as the Second Empire came to an end. Only the outbreak of the Franco-Prussian War in the following months dampened audience enthusiasm. The work was soon popular around Europe and beyond: it was produced in Vienna, Antwerp, Prague, Stockholm, Berlin, Madrid and Budapest in 1870, and in New York City at the Pike's Opera House in 1870–71.

Paris revivals included 1885 with Léonce and Dupuis from the original cast, 1900 with Marguerite Ugalde, Mathilde Auguez and Dupuis and the same year with Tariol-Baugé, at the Gaîté-Lyrique in 1921 with Andrée Alvar, Raymonde Vécart and Jean Périer, and at the Opéra-Comique in 1931 with Marcelle Denya, Emma Luart, Dranem and Louis Musy. In Germany, Gustaf Gründgens mounted the piece twice, at the Städtische Oper in 1932 in Düsseldorf in the late 1950s.

Later revivals have been produced at the Deutsche Oper Berlin in 1978 directed by Peter Ustinov, with Donald Grobe ad Falsacappa, Barry McDaniel as Duke of Mantua, Lisa Otto and Sieglinde Wagner, at the Opéra de Lyon in 1988 with Michel Trempont as Falascappa and Colette Alliot-Lugaz as Fragoletto (recorded by EMI), 1992 at Amsterdam Opera with Michel Sénéchal as Falsacappa, Michèle Lagrange as Fiorella, Brigitte Balleys as Fragoletto, Jules Bastin as Chef des carabiniers and Ryland Davies as Le baron de Campotasso, 1993 at the Opéra Bastille (produced by Jérôme Deschamps and Macha Makeïeff), and at the Opéra-Comique in 2011 with Éric Huchet as Falsacappa, Julie Boulianne as Fragoletto and Loïc Félix as Le caissier (broadcast on Medici TV).

== English versions ==
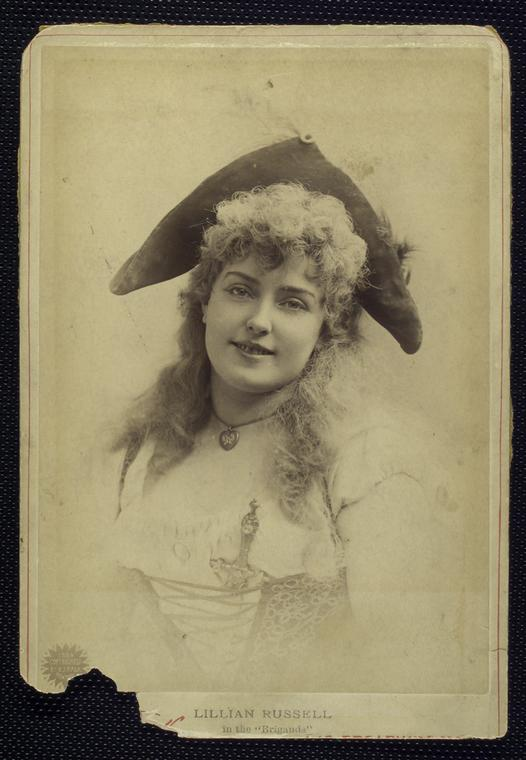
Lillian Russell as Fiorella

The piece was translated in three acts as The Brigands by English dramatist W. S. Gilbert and published by Boosey in 1871 but was not performed until 9 May 1889 at the Casino Theatre, New York City, starring Edwin Stevens as Falsacappa (the brigand chieftain), Lillian Russell as Fiorella, Fred Solomon as Pietro (the brigand lieutenant), Henry Hallam as the Duke, and Fanny Rice as Fragoletto, with an American tour thereafter. Its British premiere was on 2 September 1889 at the Theatre Royal, Plymouth, soon transferring to the Avenue Theatre in London, beginning 16 September 1889, running for about 16 nights until 12 October. It then toured, starring Hallam Mostyn as Falsacappa, H. Lingard as Pietro, Frank Wensley as Fragoletto, Agnes Dellaporte as Fiorella, Marie Luella as the Princess of Granada, and Geraldine St. Maur as Fiametta.

Gilbert was displeased with his own work, which he had created merely to secure the British copyright, and he attempted to prevent its performance in London, without success. He also objected to new songs inserted in the piece but written by another lyricist. Gilbert's arch lyrics pleased operetta audiences, who were delighted to accept a rough-and-tumble pirate band speaking impeccable drawing room English while describing dastardly deeds to gavottes and musical romps in three-quarter time. Many of the characters and situations in the piece are echoed in Gilbert and Sullivan's The Pirates of Penzance (1879) and The Gondoliers (1889). Another English version by H. S. Leigh had been presented at the Globe Theatre in London under the name Falsacappa, beginning on 13 September 1875. Camille Dubois starred as Fragoletto, Julia Vokins was the Princess of Granada and Nelly Bromley was the Prince of Popoli. This version had also been given an 1871 performance in London.

A critical edition of the work by Jean-Christophe Keck, published in 2004, includes the original French libretto by Meilhac and Halévy, the original German version by Richard Genée, W. S. Gilbert's version revised by Richard Duployen and a new English version by Stefan Troßbach

== Roles ==
Roles, voice types, premiere cast
| Role | Voice type | Premiere cast, 10 December 1869 Conductor: Jacques Offenbach |
|---|---|---|
| Adolphe de Valladolid | tenor | Henri Venderjench 'Cooper' |
| Antonio, treasurer to the Duke | tenor | Léonce |
| Barbavano | bass | Daniel Bac |
| Baron de Campo-Tasso | tenor | Charles Blondelet |
| Carmagnola | tenor | Gobin |
| Comte de Gloria-Cassis | tenor | Gourdon |
| Domino | tenor | Bordier |
| Duc de Mantoue | baritone | Constant Lanjallais |
| Falsacappa, the brigand chief | tenor | José Dupuis |
| Fiorella, his daughter | soprano | Marie Aimée |
| Fragoletto, a farmer | mezzo-soprano | Zulma Bouffar |
| La Duchesse | soprano | A Régnault |
| Pipa, wife of Pipo | soprano | Léonie |
| Pipetta, daughter of Pipo | soprano | Fanny Génat |
| Pipo, a landlord | tenor | Boulange |
| Piétro, the brigand lieutenant | tenor | Jean-Laurent Kopp |
| La Princesse de Grenade | soprano | Lucciani |
| Zerlina | soprano | Julia H. |
| Bianca | soprano | Oppenheim |
| Fiametta | soprano | Bessy |
| Ciccinella | soprano | Douard |
| Marquise | soprano | Gravier |
| Chief of the carabinieri | baritone | Baron |
| Preceptor | bass | Videix |
Chorus: Brigands, Carabinieri, Peasants, Cooks, Pages of the Mantuan court, Lords and Ladies of the Grenadan court, Pages of the Princess, Lords and Ladies of the Mantuan court.

== Synopsis ==
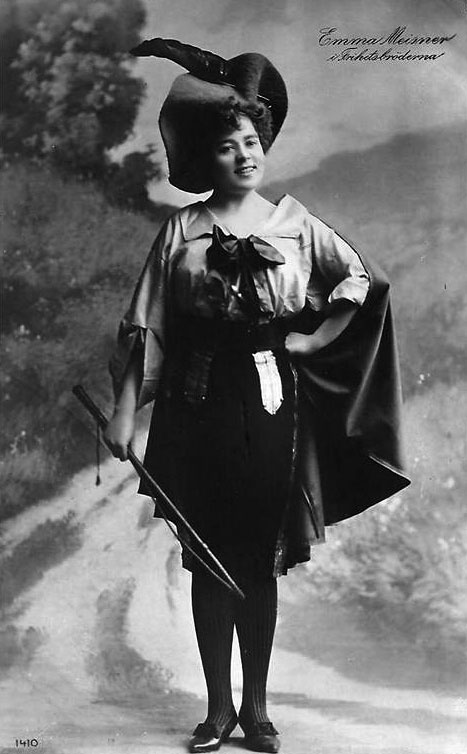
Emma Meissner as Fragoletto at the Oscarsteatern in 1906

=== Act 1 ===
A wild rocky place
The brigands assemble at dawn, but some of them complain to Falsacappa that they cannot live properly on the rewards of their work. He promises an imminent and profitable venture. The marriage of the Princess of Grenade with the Duc de Mantoue has been announced, and the band will be there.

His daughter Fiorella has fallen for the young farmer Fragoletto, whose farm the gang recently raided, and she is beginning to have doubts about their calling. She shows Piétro, the second-in-command a small portrait she has had painted of herself. Fragoletto is brought in by some of the brigands, not unwillingly, as he asks for Fiorella's hand, and to join the band. Falsacappa agrees on condition that Fragoletto prove himself.

Fiorella is left with Piétro, and a handsome stranger enters. He – fascinated by her – has lost his way. When Piétro goes to find help, she decides to warn him – in fact the Duke of Mantua – to flee. Fragoletto arrives with an intercepted message about the union of the Duke and the Princess of Granada, setting out the promise to the Spaniards of a large dowry instead of the debt owed to them. Falsacappa frees the messenger, replacing the princess's portrait in the briefcase with that of his daughter. Fragoletto has earned his place in the band; as the gang celebrate their new member they hear the sound of the boots of the carabinieri approaching, but they pass by without noticing the gang, and the brigands resume their celebration of their plans.

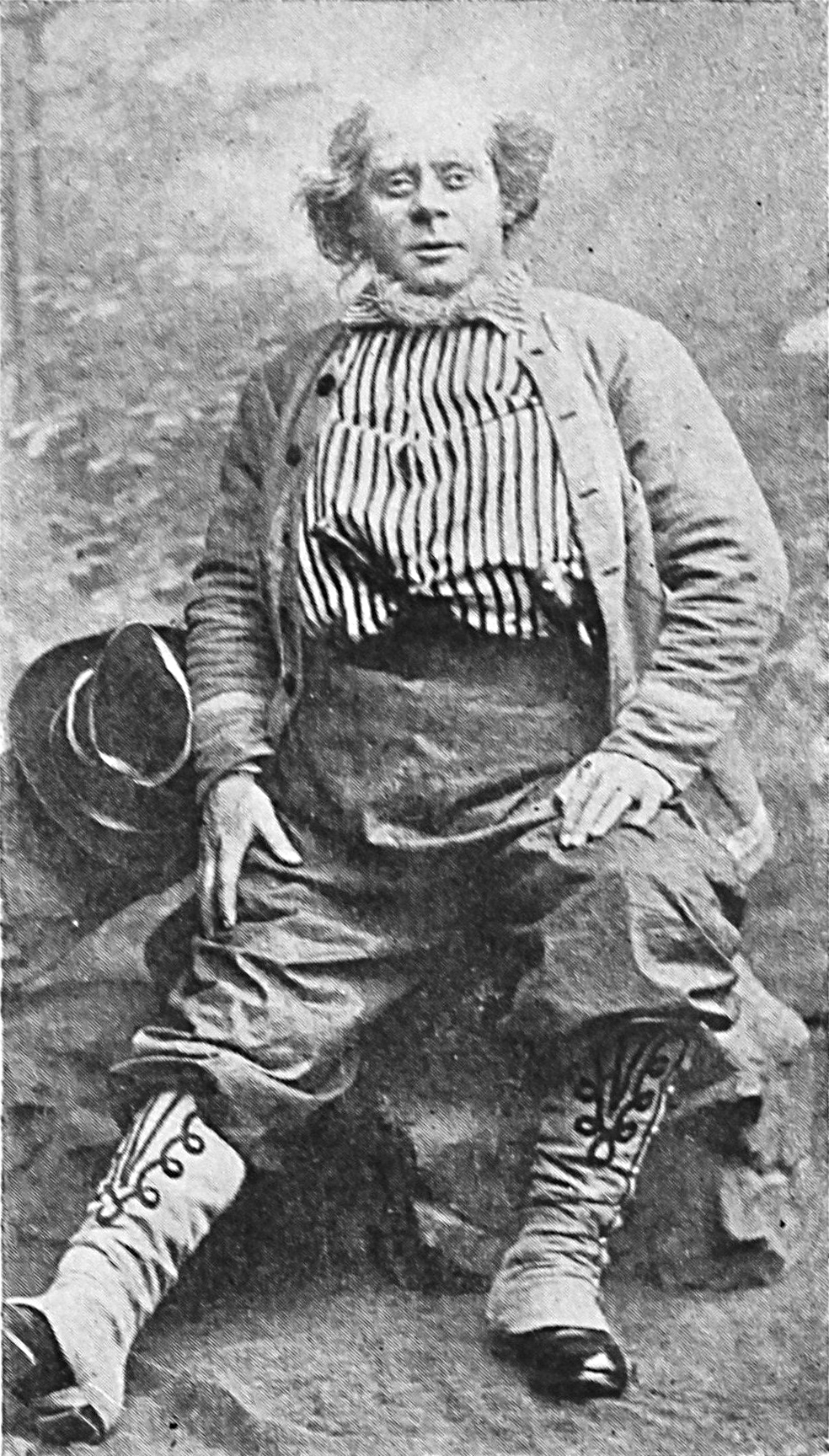
Jean Sandberg as Piétro

=== Act 2 ===
An inn on the frontier
The Mantuan delegation is heading for Pipo's inn on the border of Italy and Spain on the road from Granada to Mantua. Posing as beggars the bandits come to the inn; they quickly overwhelm the hotel staff horrified to be victims of the infamous Falsacappa.

The band plan to disguise themselves as cooks and waiters; then, when the Mantuans arrive, they will capture them in turn and re-disguise themselves as Mantuans, so that when the Granadans arrive they will surprise them, don their clothes and hasten to the Mantuan court to present Fiorella as the princess whose associate (Pietro in disguise) is worth three millions. Fiorella claims her reward, Fragolettos's hand, and the disguising begins.

When the Mantuan party arrive, led by the Baron de Campotasso and accompanied by the carabinieri they fall into the trap, but the brigands have little time to switch clothes again before the Granadan delegation reaches the inn. After a Spanish dance, the Granadans are greeted by Falsacappa as the captain of the carabinieri and Piétro as the Baron de Campotasso. Gloria-Cassis asks about the three million payment but then Fragoletto and Fiorella (as the innkeeper and his lover) enter. The Granadans become confused when told to retire to bed (at two in the afternoon) but do as they are told. Once out of their clothes, the brigands go for them for the next disguise. The innkeeper escapes his bonds and cries for help, but the brigands prevail over the carabinieri who, locked in the cellars, have helped themselves to the wine. The brigands head off towards Mantua.

=== Act 3 ===
A great hall at the court of Mantua
The Duke is taking advantage of his last hours before marriage bidding farewell to his mistresses. The portrait he has received of his bride reminds him of the peasant girl who assisted him in the mountains (and for whom he has been searching ever since). The Duke is also keen to pay off his debt of three million little knowing that his treasurer Antonio has been spending the ducal money on women of his own.

When the fake Granadan delegation arrives led by Falsacappa, the Duke is delighted to see Fiorella again, and she recognizes him as the stranger lost in the mountains. Fiorella, playing the princess of Grenade introduces Fragoletto as her page.

When Falsacappa asks for the money it emerges that the treasurer has squandered the dowry. Falsacappa is furious, but just then the Mantuans, swiftly followed by the Granadans abandoned at the inn, arrive, along with the carabineri. The real princess introduces herself. The brigands admit who they are but when Fiorella enters in her costume from Act 1 and reminds the Duke that she saved him from the brigands, he agrees to an amnesty and they swear to lead good lives from then on.

== Musical numbers ==
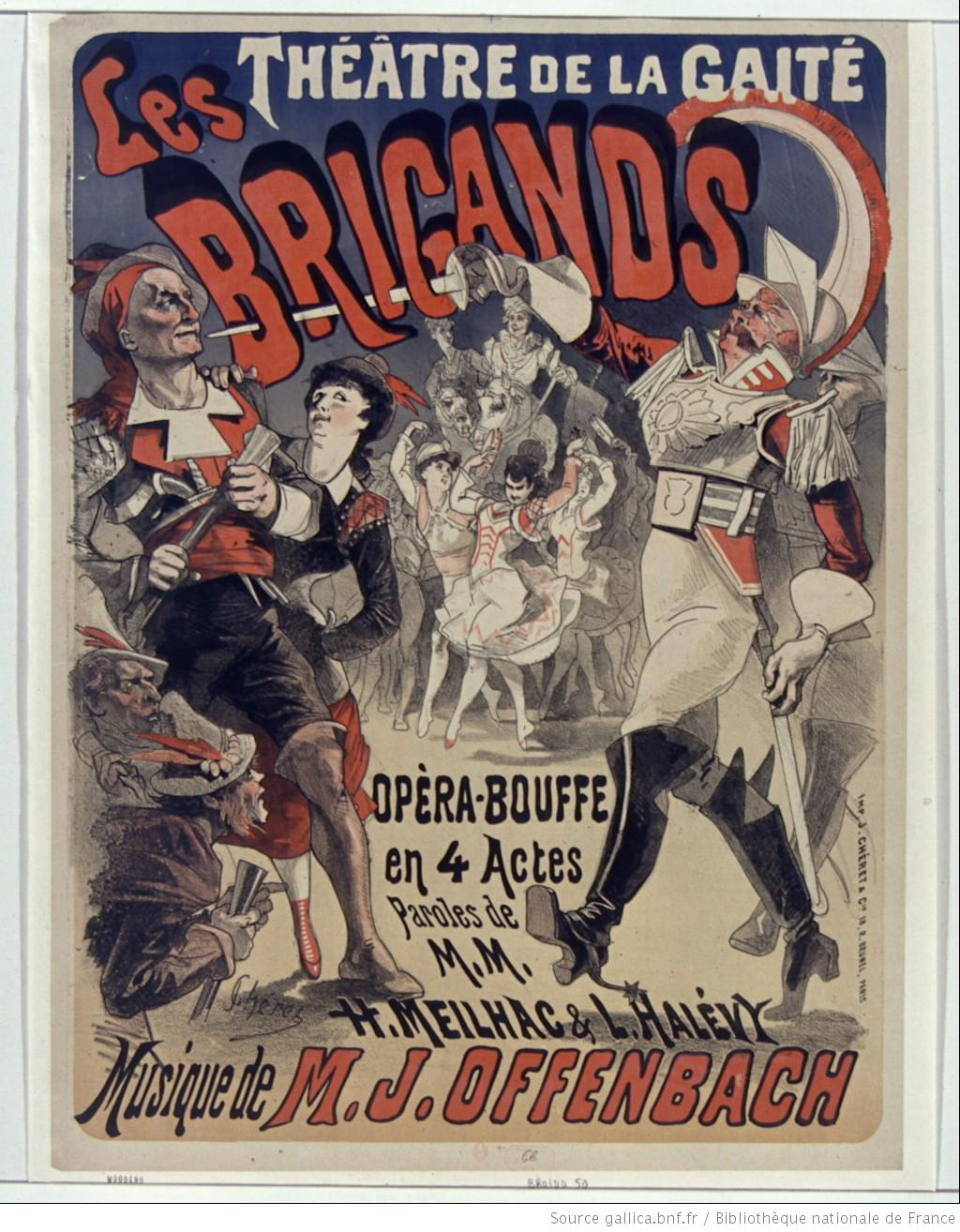
Poster by Jules Chéret for 1878

Act 1

- No.1 A – Chœur des brigands: 'Le cor dans la montagne'
- No.1 B – Couplets des jeunes filles: 'Déjà depuis une grande heure'
- No.1 C – Couplets de Falsacappa: 'Qui est celui qui par les plaines'
- No.1 D – Strette
- No.1 Bis – Melodrame;
- No.2 – Couplets de Fiorella: 'Au chapeau je porte une aigrette'
- No.3 – Morceau d'ensemble: 'Nous avons pris ce petit homme'
- No.4 – Couplets de Fragoletto: 'Quand tu me fis l’insigne honneur...'
- No.4 Bis – Choir de sortie: 'Nous avons pris ce petit homme'
- No.5 – Rondo: 'Après avoir pris à droite'
- No.6 – Saltarelle: 'Ce petit est un vrai luron'
- No.7 – Finale A – Choir la réception: 'Pour cette ceremonie'/B – 'Jure d'avoir du courage... Vole, vole, pille, vole'/C – Orgie: 'Flamme claire'/D – Choir des carabiniers: 'Nous sommes les carbiniers'/E – Strette: 'Flamme claire'

Act 2

- Entracte
- No.9 – Choir: 'Les fourneaux sont allumés' (Fiorella, Fragoletto)
- No.10 – Canon: 'Soyez pitoyables'
- No.11 – Duetto du Notaire: 'Hé! Là! Hé! Là!'
- No.12 – Trio des marmitons: 'Arrête-toi Donc, Je t'en prie' (Fragoletto, Falsacappa, Pietro)
- No.13 – Choir et melodrame: 'A nous, holà! les marmitons'
- No.14 – Choir et couplets de l'ambassade: 'Dissimulons, dissimulons... Nous avons ce matin tous deux' (Campo Tasso, le capitaine)
- No.15 – Choir, melodrame et scene, couplets: 'Entrez-là!... Grenade, Infante des Espagnes...Jadis vous n'aviez qu'une patrie'
- No.16 – Couplets de Fiorella: 'Je n’en sais rien, Madame'
- No.17 – Finale: Choir, Ensemble, Scene: 'Entrez-là!... Tous sans trompettes ni tambour... Quels sont ces cris?...'

Act 3

- No.18 – Entracte
- No.19 – Chœur de fête et couplets du prince: 'L'aurore paraît... Jadis régnait un prince'
- No.20 – Couplets du caissier: 'O mes amours, O mes maîtresses'
- No.21 – Morceau d’ensemble: 'Voici venir la princesse et son page'
- No.22 – Finale: 'Coquin, brigand, traître, bandit!'

== Recordings ==
This work has been recorded a number of times:

- John Eliot Gardiner recorded the three-act version with chorus and orchestra of the Opéra de Lyon for EMI in 1988 (CD 7 49830 2).
- Gilbert's English version was recorded by Ohio Light Opera in 2004, Albany Records, ASIN: B00022FWVS.
- There is a German version by Ernst Dohm, Die Banditen, which was recorded and released in 2002 on the Capriccio label, Catalog: 60090. Conductor, Pinchas Steinberg.
