= Jean-Laurent Kopp =

French actor and singer (1812–1872)

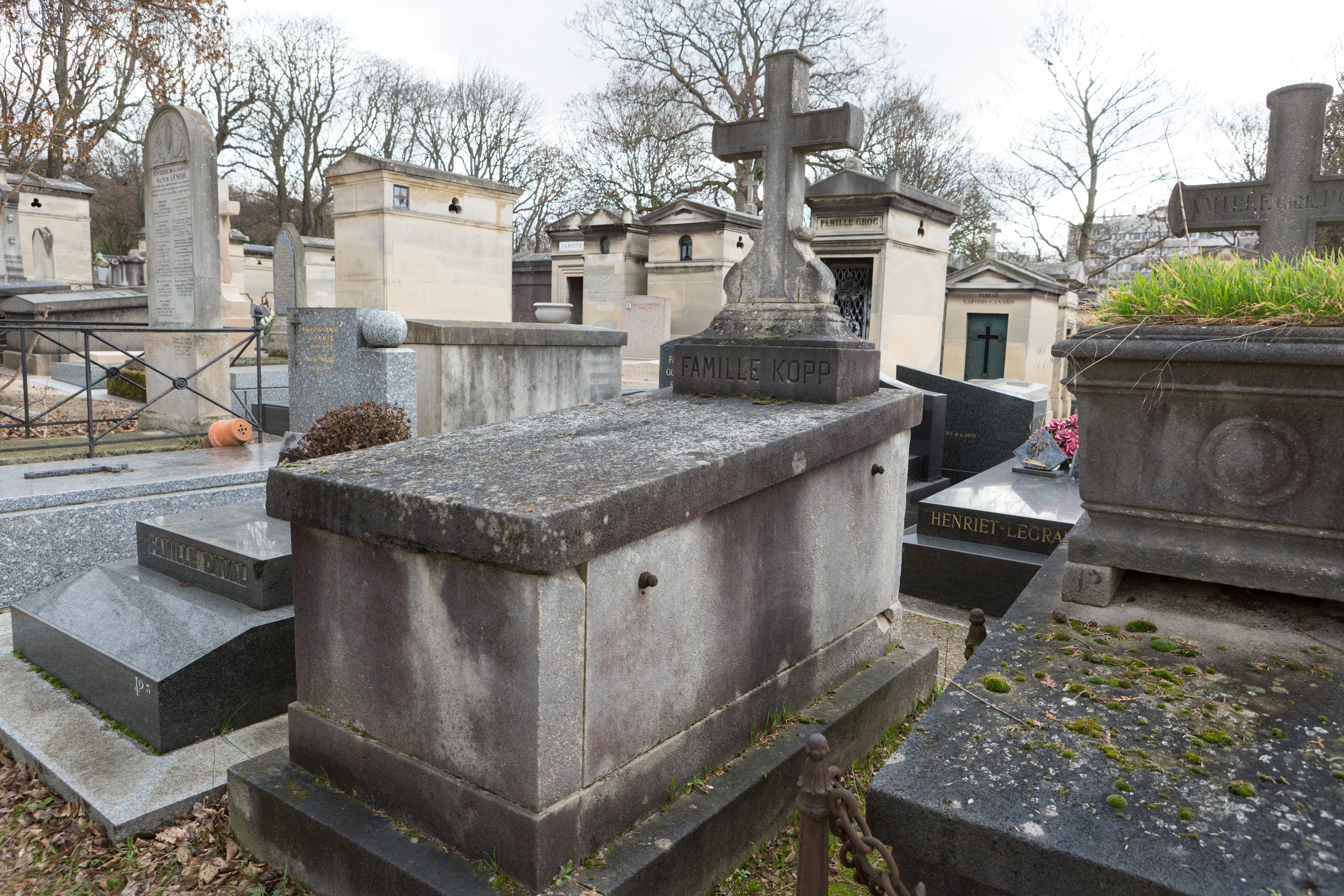
Jean-Laurent Kopp's grave at Père Lachaise Cemetery

Jean-Laurent Kopp (8 November 1812 – 23 September 1872) was a French actor and singer.

== Career ==
Born in Paris, an orphan raised at the Quinze-Vingts National Ophthalmology Hospital, Kopp made his debut at the Théâtre de Belleville before moving, in the role of a comic actor, to the Théâtre Beaumarchais.

After a brief stint at the Théâtre de la Renaissance in 1841, he joined the Théâtre des Variétés where he spent most of his career (except for a long tour of the provinces from 1855 to 1860). He appeared in numerous plays, including many by Labiche including The Italian Straw Hat and others but it was in the opéras-bouffes by Jacques Offenbach that he met his greatest successes: he was in turn Menelaus in La belle Hélène (1864), King Bobêche in Barbe-bleue (1866), Baron Puck in La Grande-Duchesse de Gérolstein (1867), Baptiste in Le pont des soupirs (1868) and Pietro in Les Brigands (1869).

Shortly after appearing in Paris in the premiere of Les cent vierges by Charles Lecocq he committed suicide, for unknown reasons. He was buried in the Cimetière du Père-Lachaise.
