= Mathilde Auguez =

French soprano

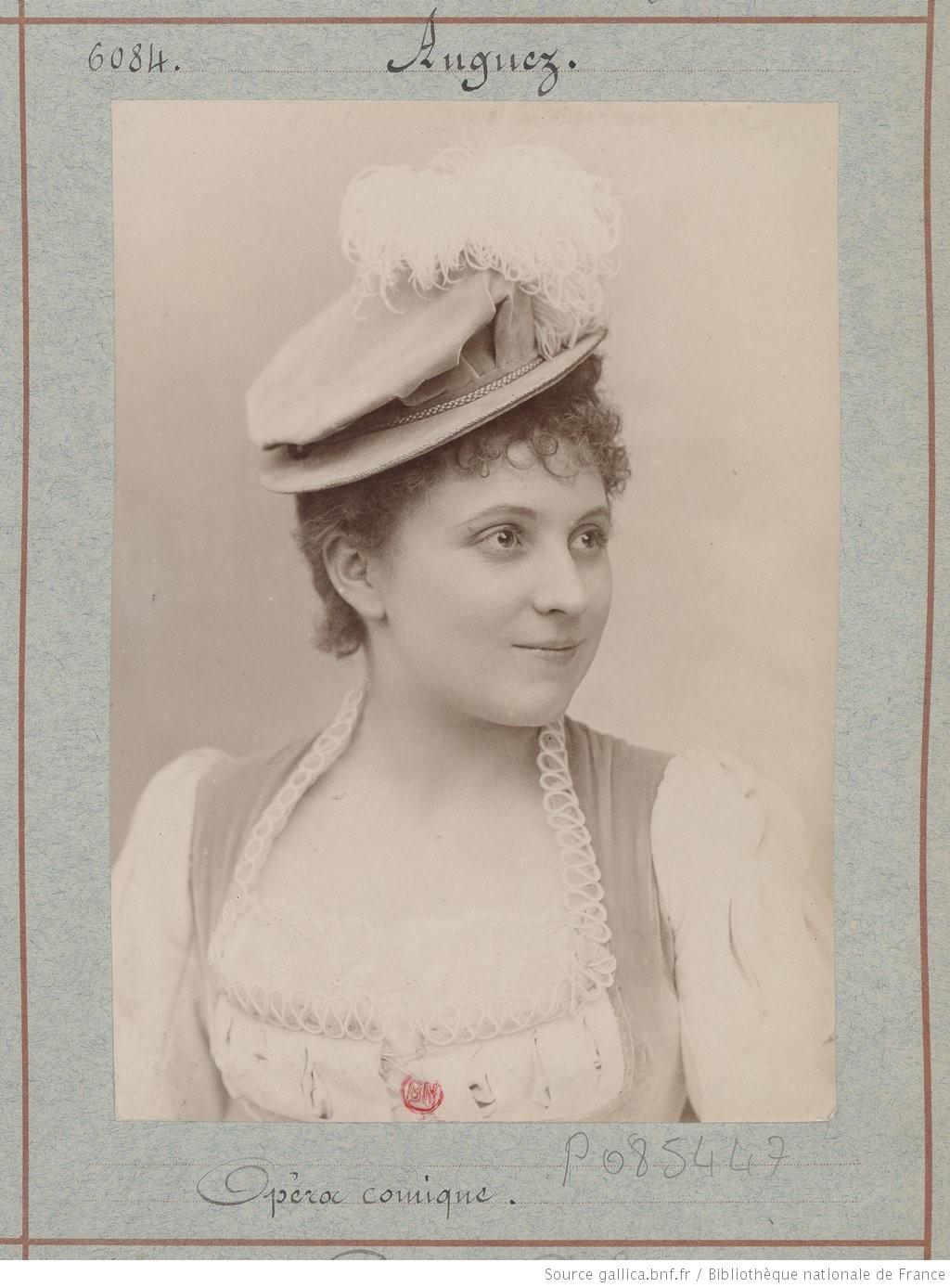
Mathilde Auguez (photo from the Nadar workshop, 1875–1895).

Pauline Mathilde Lucie Auguez de Montalant (28 March 1868 – 18 July 1955) was a French opera singer (light soprano).

== Biography ==
=== Training ===
Auguez was born in Amiens. Her father, Auguste Jules Arsène, was employed by the railway. As a student at the Conservatoire de Paris, she received a third medal for solfège in 1885, a first prize for opéra comique in 1886, a second singing prize in 1887 and a second prize for opéra comique in 1887.

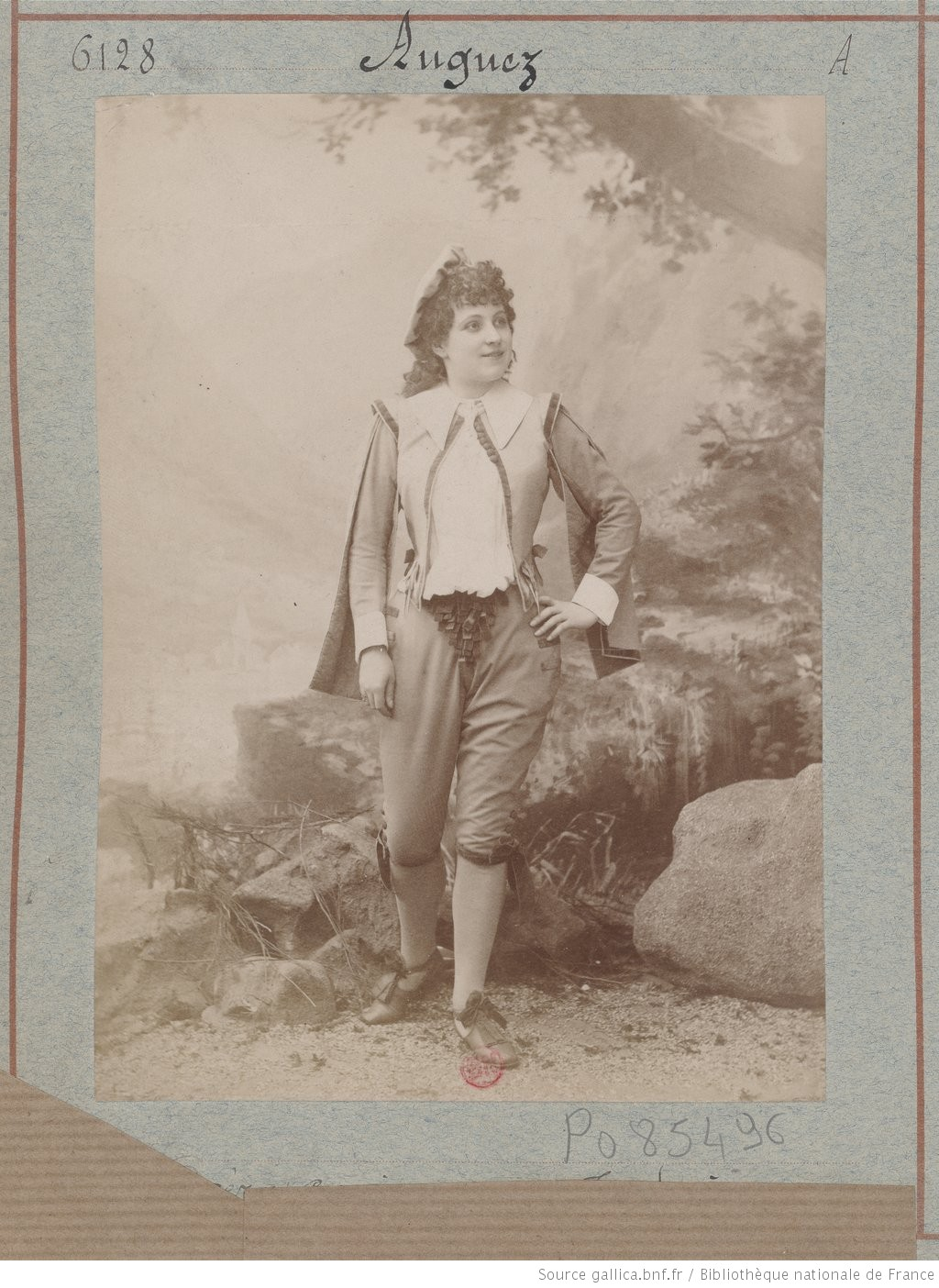
Mathide Auguez as Isabelle in the opera comique Turlupin (album from the Nadar workshop. Vol. 31)

=== Career ===
Her stage debut was in 1887 at the Opéra-Comique. Her first important role, on 29 March 1888, was at that theatre in Madame Turlupin, an opéra comique by Ernest Guiraud, in which she played Isabelle. She then sang in le Baiser de Suzon by Herman Bemberg (premiere, role of Suzon); in Gounod's Mireille and Maillard's Les dragons de Villars. On 30 January 1889, she premiered Louis Varney's la Vénus d'Arles at the Théâtre des Nouveautés. On 11 December 1891, at the Théâtre des Variétés, she was Denise de Flavigny in Hervé's Mam'zelle Nitouche. Later at the Variétés, she played in Offenbach's les Brigands.

In 1894, she gave a song recital at la Bodinière, which earned her this comment in la Caricature:

The divine Romance was dead! when fortunately, in the year of grace 1894, Miss Mathilde Auguez, granddaughter of Loïsa Puget, and Mr. Cooper, grandson of Pierre-Jean Garat, raised it up again.

Her performances were frequently acclaimed by critics. For example, the Journal amusant wrote in 1910:

Auguez de Montalant, who possesses to the supreme degree the science of singing, sang the Panis Angelicus and the Great Air of Redemption wonderfully. It was a great success, as usual. The voice is pure, clear, well timbred, excellent articulation, and Miss Auguez de Montlant also charms the audience with a style and knowledge of very rare nuances nowadays.

On 10 March 1898, she married journalist and playwright Henri Lavedan. Auguez died on 18 July 1955 at her home in the 6th arrondissement of Paris. She is buried with her husband and their daughter Geneviève at Père-Lachaise Cemetery.

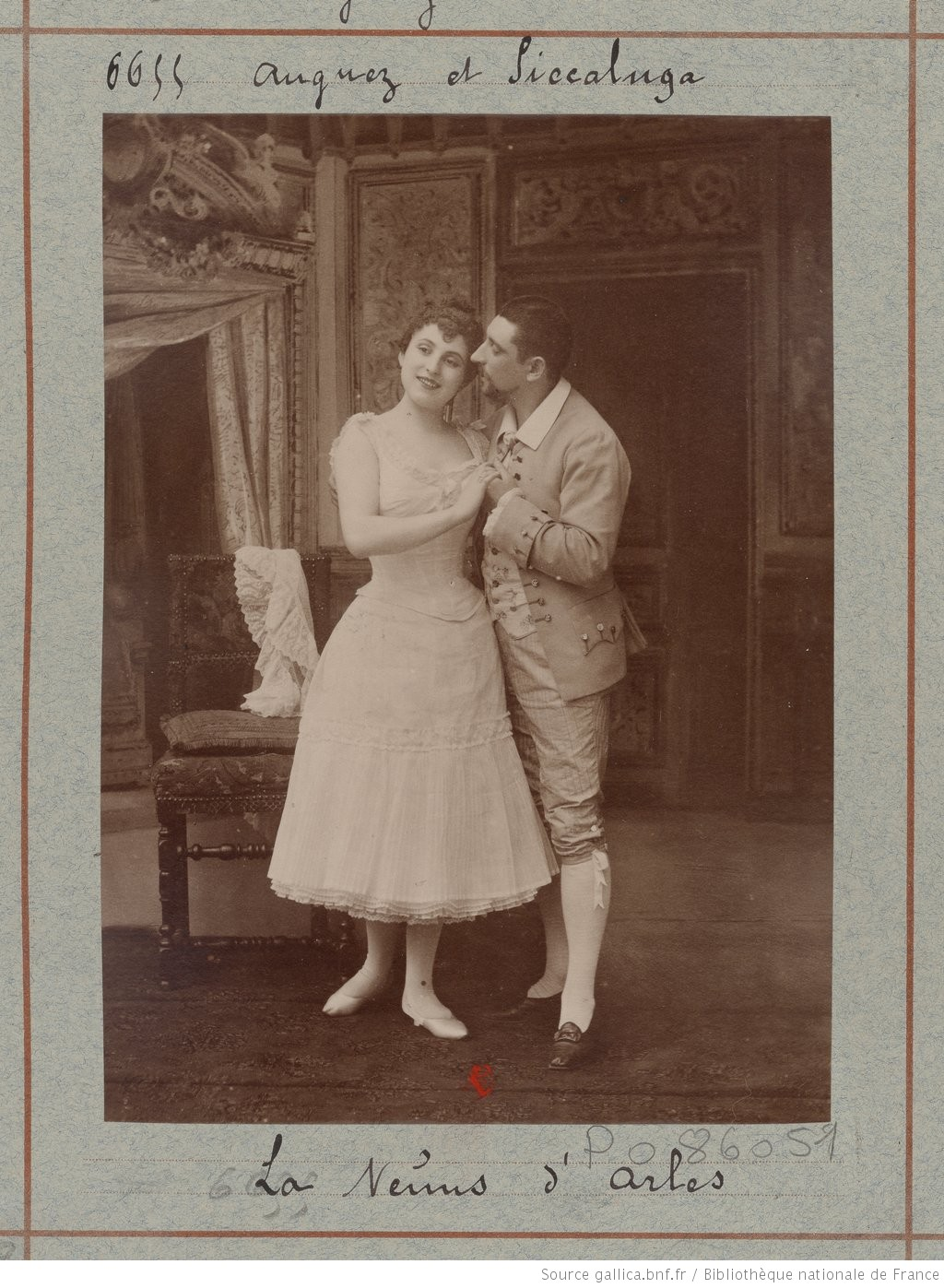
Mathilde Auguez and Albert Piccaluga in la Vénus d'Arles, Nadar workshop.
