= Theatre de la Renaissance =

Coordinates: 29.9656°N 90.0566°W

The Theatre de la Renaissance was a theater in New Orleans, Louisiana. It opened in 1840, with members of the Negro Philharmonic Orchestra performing, and an entirely black cast and music director. The Theatre's programs included variety shows, plays and other productions, aimed at African American audiences.

== See also ==
- List of opera houses
