= Copyright performance =

The copyright performance of a play was a first public performance in the United Kingdom, staged purely for the purpose of securing the author's copyright over the text. There was a fear that, if a play's text was published, or a rival production staged, before its official preview or premiere, then the author's rights would be lost; to forestall these abuses, the practice arose of staging a copyright performance, which was notionally public, but in practice staged hastily before an invited audience with no publicity and no regard for the artistic quality of the acting or production. One legal authority wrote that such a performance, "though probably not necessary to fulfill any legal requirement, permits registration of first performance at Stationers' Hall and gives useful public notice to possible infringers." The practice was common in the decades after the Berne Convention of 1886; the United States was not a signatory, and plays first staged there were ineligible for copyright in the United Kingdom.

George Bernard Shaw's The Philanderer had a copyright performance hastily arranged in 1898 just before its publication in Plays Pleasant and Unpleasant. The play's more controversial scenes were cut from the performance to secure the approval required from the Lord Chamberlain, but restored in the printed version. Many less commercially viable plays were never performed other than in a single copyright performance. Novelists sometimes arranged copyright performances of dramatisations of their works; a single 1897 performance of Dracula enabled the widow of Bram Stoker to sue F. W. Murnau in 1922 when his unlicensed cinematic adaptation Nosferatu was shown in Britain.

Copyright performances were rendered unnecessary by the Copyright Act 1911 (1 & 2 Geo. 5. c. 46), which secured the author's rights over unpublished and unperformed works and derivatives.
