= List of operas and operettas by Edmond Audran =

This is a list of operas and operettas by Edmond Audran (1840–1901).

== List ==
Title	Genre	Subdivisions	Libretto	Première date	Place, theatre
L'ours et le pacha	opéra comique	1 act	after Eugène Scribe and J X B Saintine	1862	Marseille, Grand
La chercheuse d'esprit	opéra comique	1 act	after Charles Simon Favart	April 1866	Marseille, Grand
La nivernaise	opéra comique	1 act		December 1866	Marseille, Gymnase
Le petit poucet	opérette	3 acts		April 1868	Marseille, Gymnase
Le grand mogol	opéra bouffe	3 acts (1877), 4 acts (1884)	Henri Chivot and Alfred Duru	24 February 1877 (first version); 19 September 1884 (second version)	Marseille, Gymnase (first version), Paris, Théâtre de la Gaîté (second version)
Le Saint-Valentin	opérette	1 act	St Armand-Cercle	1878	Paris
Les noces d'Olivette	opéra comique	3 acts	Henri Chivot and Alfred Duru	13 November 1879	Paris, Théâtre des Bouffes Parisiens
La mascotte	opéra comique	3 acts	Henri Chivot and Alfred Duru	28 December 1880	Paris, Théâtre des Bouffes Parisiens
Gillette de Narbonne	opéra comique	3 acts	Henri Chivot and Alfred Duru	11 November 1882	Paris, Théâtre des Bouffes Parisiens
Les pommes d'or	opérette-féerie	3 acts	Henri Chivot and Alfred Duru	12 February 1883	Paris, Théâtre des Menus-Plaisirs
La dormeuse éveillée	opéra comique	3 acts	Henri Chivot and Alfred Duru	29 December 1883	Paris, Théâtre des Bouffes Parisiens
Pervenche	opérette	3 acts	Henri Chivot and Alfred Duru	31 March 1885	Paris, Théâtre des Bouffes Parisiens
Serment d'amour	opéra comique	3 acts	Maurice Ordonneau	19 February 1886	Paris, Théâtre des Nouveautés
Indiana	opéra comique	3 acts	Henry Brougham Farnie	4 October 1886	Manchester, Comedy
La cigale et la fourmi	opéra comique	3 acts	Henri Chivot and Alfred Duru	30 October 1886	Paris, Théâtre de la Gaîté
La paradis de Mahomet	opérette	3 acts		1887	Brussels, Alhambra
La fiancée des Verts-Poteaux	opéra comique	3 acts	Maurice Ordonneau	8 November 1887	Paris, Théâtre des Menus-Plaisirs
Le puits qui parle	opéra comique	3 acts	Beaumont and Paul Burani	15 March 1888	Paris, Théâtre des Nouveautés
Miette	opérette	3 acts	Maurice Ordonneau	24 September 1888	Paris, Renaissance
La petite fronde	opéra comique	3 acts	Henri Chivot and Alfred Duru	16 November 1888	Paris, Théâtre des Folies-Dramatiques
La fille à Cacolet	vaudeville-opérette	3 acts	Henri Chivot and Alfred Duru	10 July 1889	Paris, Théâtre des Variétés
L'Œuf rouge	opéra comique	3 acts	William Busnach and Vanloo	14 March 1890	Paris, Théâtre des Folies-Dramatiques
Miss Helyett	opérette	3 acts	Maxime Boucheron	12 November 1890	Paris, Théâtre des Bouffes Parisiens
L'oncle Célestin	opérette bouffe	3 acts	Maurice Ordonneau and Kéroul	24 March 1891	Paris, Théâtre des Menus-Plaisirs
Article de Paris	opérette	3 acts	Maxime Boucheron	17 March 1892	Paris, Théâtre des Menus-Plaisirs
Sainte Freya	opéra comique	3 acts	Maxime Boucheron	4 November 1892	Paris, Théâtre des Bouffes Parisiens
Madame Suzette	opérette	3 acts	André Sylvane and Maurice Ordonneau	29 March 1893	Paris, Théâtre des Bouffes Parisiens
Mon prince	opéra comique	3 acts	Charles Clairville and Silvain	18 November 1893	Paris, Théâtre des Nouveautés
L'enlèvement de la Toledad	opérette	3 acts	Fabrice Carré	17 October 1894	Paris, Théâtre des Bouffes Parisiens
La duchesse de Ferrare	opérette	3 acts	Maxime Boucheron	25 January 1895	Paris, Théâtre des Bouffes Parisiens
Photis	opéra comique	3 acts	L Gallet	February 1896	Geneva, Grand Théâtre
La reine des reines	opérette	3 acts	Robert de Flers	14 October 1896	Strasbourg, Théâtre de l'Eldorado
La poupée	opéra comique	prelude and three acts	Maurice Ordonneau, after E T A Hoffmann's The Sandman	21 October 1896	Paris, Théâtre de la Gaîté
Monsieur Lohengrin	operetta	3 acts	Fabrice Carré	30 November 1896	Paris, Théâtre des Bouffes Parisiens
Les petites femmes	opérette	4 acts	Sylvane	11 October 1897	Paris, Théâtre des Bouffes Parisiens
Les soeurs Gaudichard	opéra comique	3 acts	Maurice Ordonneau	21 April 1899	Paris, Théâtre de la Gaîté
Le curé Vincent	opérette	3 acts	Maurice Ordonneau	25 October 1901	Paris, Théâtre de la Gaîté
