= La cigale et la fourmi =

Opéra comique by Edmond Audran

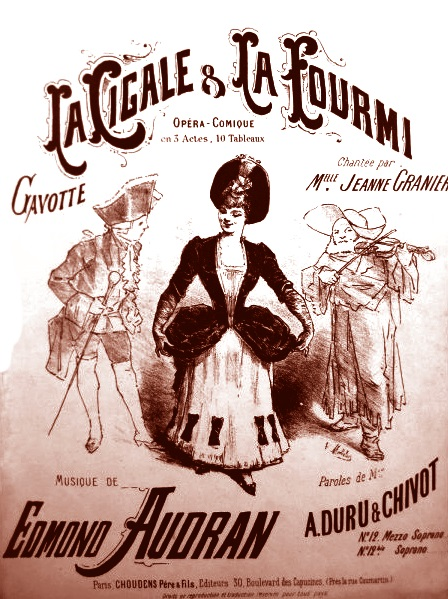
Sheet music for the gavotte from La cigale et la fourmi, the most popular number

La cigale et la fourmi (The Grasshopper and the Ant) is a three-act opéra comique, (Note: Kurt Gänzl and Andrew Lamb categorise the work as an opérette in Gänzl's Book of the Musical Theatre, but the score is published as an opéra comique, and it is so termed in Grove's Dictionary of Music and Musicians.) with music by Edmond Audran and words by Henri Chivot and Alfred Duru. Loosely based on Jean de La Fontaine's version of Aesop's fable The Ant and the Grasshopper, the opera shows the lives of two young women, one prudent, like the ant, the other improvident and reckless, like the grasshopper. Unlike the Aesop fable this version has a happy ending, with the "ant" looking after the destitute "grasshopper".

The work was first performed at the Théâtre de la Gaîté, Paris on 3 October 1886, running for 141 performances. It was later adapted into English for a long-running production in London and productions in New York, Australia and New Zealand.

== Background and first performance ==
After considerable success at the box-office with the opéra comique La mascotte (1880), Audran and his usual librettists, Henri Chivot and Alfred Duru, had written five shows in a row that failed to rival it. Of these, Gillette de Narbonne (1882) and Le grand mogol (1884) both ran for more than 100 performances – regarded as the criterion of reasonable success in Parisian theatres at the time – but a succès fou had proved elusive. Audran tried working with other collaborators – Maurice Ordonneau (Serment d'amour, 1886) and H. B. Farnie (Indiana, 1886) – without conspicuous success, and returned to Chivot and Duru when commissioned to provide a piece for the Théâtre de la Gaîté in Paris. The title characters, the grasshopper and the ant, allude to Jean de La Fontaine's retelling of Aesop's fable The Ant and the Grasshopper, in which the improvident grasshopper sings away the summer, and starves in the winter, unlike the provident ant, who has gathered and stored food in readiness for the season.

The biggest draw at the Gaîté was its leading lady, Jeanne Granier, for whom Audran and his partners wrote the role of Thérèse, the extravagant, feckless heroine. The mezzo-soprano lead, Charlotte, the thoughtful "ant", was sung by Louise Thuillier-Leloir, for whom the collaborators had written before, in Le grand mogol (1884) and Pervenche (1885). La cigale et la fourmi opened on 3 October 1886 and ran for 141 performances, taking just over half a million francs at the box-office, putting it roughly on a par with Le grand mogol but not approaching the success of La mascotte.

== Original cast ==
Act I: Thérèse and Charlotte at front centre

- Thérèse – Jeanne Granier
- Charlotte – Louise Thuillier-Leloir
- La duchesse de Fayensberg – Mdlle. Fassi
- La Frivolini – Mddle. Paula
- La mère Catherine – Mddle. Baudu
- Le chevalier Frantz de Bernheim – Georges Mauguière
- Vincent – M. Alexandre
- Le duc de Fayensberg – M. Raiter
- Guillaume – M. Petit
- Mathias – M. Scipion
- An old beggar – M. Gobereau

Source: Vocal score.

== Synopsis ==
The opera is set in the 18th century in a small Flemish village near the city of Bruges, and later in the city.

Act I
The village, and later, Bruges

The villagers are celebrating the wedding of Guillaume and Charlotte. The latter – like the ant of the fable – is prudent and moderate. Her beloved cousin and foster sister, Thérèse, is like the grasshopper: impulsive, generous and improvident. The girls' uncle, Mathias, has come from Bruges to attend the wedding. He is the maître d'hôtel of the Faisan d'Or, Bruges's grandest hotel. Thérèse is thrilled by Mathias's description of Bruges and its metropolitan delights. Her admirer, Vincent, son of the village schoolmaster, is sad at the prospect that Thérèse will inevitably be drawn away from the village in search of adventure in the city. The benevolent Mathias encourages Vincent to declare his love to Thérèse, which he does, but she says she is not ready to settle down to marriage yet. She conceals herself in Mathias's carriage and gets to Bruges. She persuades her uncle to set her up as a florist in the lobby of the hotel, and spends her first earnings on going to the opera, which fascinates her and excites an ambition to become an opera singer.

Two weeks after Thérèse's arrival in Bruges there is a grand masked ball at the Faisan d'Or, an event much favoured by the local nobility for its scope for amorous intrigue. The Chevalier Frantz de Bernheim comes to rendezvous with the Duchesse de Fayensberg, whose husband is otherwise engaged in a liaison with the dancer La Frivolini. The duke intrudes into Frantz's tête-à-tête with the duchess, who quickly hides behind a screen. The duke is amused to find his friend in an intrigue and does not realise with whom. After the duke leaves, the duchess, shaken at her narrow escape, insists that Frantz should conspicuously flirt with another woman, to put the duke off the scent. Thérèse gains entry to the ball to sell flowers. The duke concludes that she is the object of Frantz's interest, and Frantz plays up to this misapprehension. Thérèse sings for the assembled company, and the duke vows that he will get her into the opera company: the guests drink a champagne toast to the duke's new protégée.

Act II
Bruges

Guillaume and Charlotte have come for their first visit to the city. They are surprised to bump into Vincent who is supposed to be on an educational tour of the country but has followed Thérèse to Bruges. He tells them that they will find her much changed. With the duke's influence she has become a star of the opera, and lives a lavish lifestyle. Both Frantz and the duke are distinctly interested in her, much to the duchess's displeasure.

Charlotte, Guillaume and Vincent overhear the duchess in conversation with Frantz, and are horrified to discover that Thérèse is being used to furnish a smoke-screen for an aristocratic affair. Thérèse is reluctant to believe them, but the manoeuvrings of the duchess and Frantz make it clear that the story is true. At the duke's ball that evening she takes her revenge by singing a song about a rose who wanted to hide its love affair with a butterfly and so bade him make love to a little grasshopper. She then shocks the guests by declaring that Frantz is the butterfly and she is the grasshopper; she does not name the rose but leaves people to guess that it is the duchess. She flees the ballroom and leaves Bruges.

Thérèse's dream – rejected by Charlotte

Act III
Three months later, in the village

Charlotte and Guillaume continue to live their busy, contented rural life. Mathias has come to join them, driven from Bruges by embarrassment about the events at the duke's ball. Vincent has spent much of the three months since the incident searching for Thérèse, but she has vanished from Bruges. So too have Frantz and the duke. The duke has been banished by his Prince, shocked at the scandal in the ducal family, and Frantz, like Vincent, has been searching for Thérèse, having realised that his pretended love for her has become a compelling reality.

When there is nobody about, Thérèse enters. She is weary and down-at-heel, having been walking the country scraping a living as a street singer. She is too nervous to knock at the door of her cousin, and falls asleep outdoors, wrapping her tattered coat around her. She dreams that she has called on Charlotte for aid and been cruelly rejected and, in her sleep, she cries out in despair. The cry wakes the family who hurry outside to find her lying unconscious. When Thérèse wakes she finds herself in bed in the room that she occupied as a young girl, and the horror of the dream is soothed away by the care of her loving family. It is Christmas, and Thérèse is able to enjoy a simple family Christmas again.

Frantz and the duke turn up, and the talk turns to matters of the heart. Vincent suggests that it is time for Thérèse to marry and settle down. But he is not putting himself forward as a suitor: he recognises the devotion displayed by Frantz, whose proposal of marriage Thérèse accepts. The duke receives a letter from the duchess telling him that she has persuaded the Prince to lift his banishment, and all ends happily.

Source: The Era and Gänzl's Book of the Musical Theatre.

== Numbers ==
Act I

- Overture
- Chorus – "Ils ont dit oui" – They said yes
- Song (Charlotte) – "Au temps passé les animaux parlaient" – In times past the animals spoke
- Song (Thérèse) – "Ah! vive la chanson d'été" – Hurrah for the song of summer
- Duet (Thérèse, Vincent) – "Allons, parlez, je vous écoute" – Speak – I am listening
- Ensemble (Charlotte, Thérèse, Vincent, Guillaume, Mathias – "Au revoir" – Goodbye
- Air (Thérèse) – "Mon oncle, la chose est certaine" – Uncle, the thing is certain
- Frantz – "Le Duc d'humeur fort inconstante" – The Duke is of a very inconstant mood
- Chorus – "Le grelot de la folie" – The bell of madness
- Thérèse – "Un jour Margot" – One day Margot
- Finale (Thérèse, Frantz, Vincent, Guillaume, Mathias) – "O vin charmant qui pétille!" – O charming sparkling wine!

Act II

- Chorus – "C'est le jour de kermesse" – It's the day of the fair
- Duet (Charlotte, Guillaume) – "Le père Antoine un matin" – Father Antoine one morning
- Rondo (Vincent) – "Je souffle" – I breathe
- Chorus – "Les mirlitons, les crécelles" – Reed pipes and rattles
- Gavotte (Thérèse) – "Ma mère j'entends le violon" – Mother, I hear a violin
- Villanelle (Charlotte) – "J'aime mieux notre humble foyer" – I prefer our humble home
- Duet (Charlotte, Thérèse) – "Petit Noël avec mystère" – Father Christmas with mystery
- Quartet (Charlotte, Thérèse, Vincent, Guillaume) – "Tu n'as pas, j'en ai l'assurance" – You do not have, I'm sure
- Couplets (Thérèse, Frantz) – "On m'a dit que vous me trompez" – I was told that you deceived me
- Chorus – "En cette demeure spendide" – In this splendid house
- Finale (Thérèse) – "C'est l'histoire d'une cigale" – This is the story of a grasshopper

Act III

- Chorus – "Que dans cette ferme" – What in this farm
- Couplets (Charlotte) – "Le soir lorsque chacun a rempli sa journée" – In the evening when everyone has filled their day
- Romance (Frantz) – "Oui, la raison guidant son coeur" – Yes, the reason guiding his heart
- Dream (Thérèse, Charlotte) – "Frapper à cette porte … Je suis sans pain et sans asile" – Knock on this door ... I am without bread or a place to go
- Chorus of children – "Le cloches en carillon" – The carillon bells
- Duet (Thérèse, Charlotte) – "Petit Noël avec mystère" – Father Christmas with mystery
- Finale (Thérèse) – "O jour béni" – O blessed day

Source: Vocal score.

== Revivals and adaptations ==
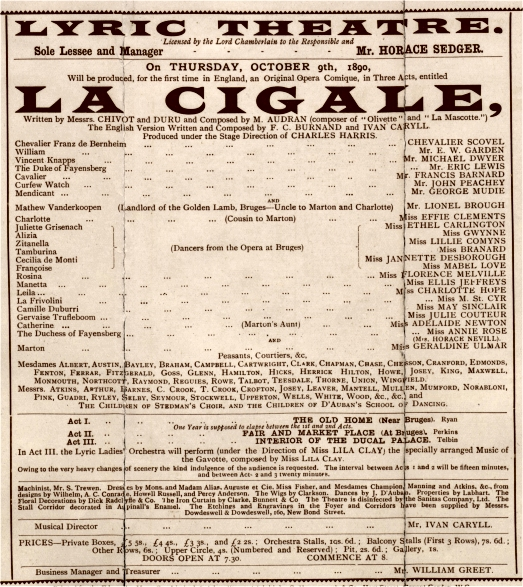
Programme for English premiere, 1890

The piece was revived at the Gaîté in 1887 with Mme Morin, and in 1904 with Juliette Simon-Girard. A production opened at the Lyric Theatre, London, on 9 October 1890, under the title La Cigale, in a version by F. C. Burnand and Gilbert à Beckett, starring Geraldine Ulmar, Eric Lewis and Lionel Brough. Some additional songs were composed by Ivan Caryll for this production. (Note: Caryll's contributions were, in Act I, a new introduction and children's chorus; a song,"Too late" for Franz (sic – Burnand made some changes to characters' names); a chorus, "Dance and sing"; and the finale "La Gloria"; in the second act, "Trifle not with love" (Franz); a trio, "Excuse me, Diva" and a new finale; in the last act, the opening, "Passe pied", and the song "Santa Claus". He also wrote some incidental music and arranged and extended some of Audran's pieces. Gänzl and Lamb note that a second gavotte, this one by Lila Clay, was introduced into the third act.) The London run lasted for 423 performances. (Note: It was not unusual for Audran's works to run longer in London than in Paris.) The same adaptation was presented at the Casino Theatre, New York, on 26 October 1891, starring Lillian Russell, who headed the cast in a revival there the following year. The opera was first produced in Australia, also in the Burnand and à Beckett adaptation, at the Princess Theatre, Melbourne, on 13 February 1892, and was given in New Zealand in 1895 by the Williamson and Musgrove company, starring Nellie Stewart. The opera was given in Italian as La Cicala e la Formia by the Angelini-Gattini Opera Company of Milan at the Century Theatre, New York in April 1913.

== Critical reception ==
The Paris correspondent of the London paper The Era commented that although La cigale et la fourmi was billed as a comic opera, it was in reality "a compound of operetta, vaudeville, drama and extravaganza rolled together somewhat confusedly". He found the story puerile and the dialogue lacking any kind of sparkle; he judged the score to be good in parts, but one that did not advance Audran's reputation. The annual review of Parisian productions Les Annales du théâtre et de la musique also considered the libretto puerile, and thought Audran had done well to rescue it with a score full of happy discoveries and pleasing melodies. (Note: "MM. Chivot et Duru ont été souvent mieux inspirés: rien de moins original et de moins spirituel, de plus puéril et de moins divertissant que le livret enfantin qu'ils ont remis, cette fois, à M. Audran. Le musicien du moins a fort habilement tiré son épingle du jeu, et a trouvé le moyen d'écrire sur ce livret banal une partition toute pleine d'heureuses trouvailles et d'agréable mélodies".) Reviewing the London production, The Era's London critic was more enthusiastic: "A more exquisite comic opera than La Cigale has not been seen in London for many years." Burnand's adaptation of the libretto was judged "pretty, refined, innocent and sympathetic", and Audran's score "the best comic opera music the composer has written". The critic of The Sydney Morning Herald called the piece "a genuine comic opera, characterised by the vivacity and dainty grace of the music and the splendour of its mise-en-scène".

== Recordings ==
The earliest recording of music from the opera was issued on wax cylinder: Marguerite Revel sings the gavotte "Ma mère j'entends le violin". A complete recording of the opera, made in 1955, starring Liliane Berton, conducted by Marcel Cariven, has been released on CD.

== Notes, references and sources ==
=== Sources ===
- Audran, Edmond; Alfred Duru; Henri Chivot (1886). La cigale et la fourmi, vocal score. Paris: Kriegelstein. OCLC 980601466.
- Gänzl, Kurt; Andrew Lamb (1988). Gänzl's Book of the Musical Theatre. London: The Bodley Head. OCLC 966051934.
- La Fontaine, Jean de (1852) [1666]. Fables. Paris: Firmin Didot Frères. OCLC 337376.
- Noël, Edouard; Edmond Stoullig (1883). Les annales du théâtre et de la musique: 1882 (in French). Paris: G. Charpentier. OCLC 762342119.
- Noël, Edouard; Edmond Stoullig (1884). Les annales du théâtre et de la musique: 1883 (in French). Paris: G. Charpentier. OCLC 762324893.
- Noël, Edouard; Edmond Stoullig (1886). Les annales du théâtre et de la musique: 1885 (in French). Paris: G. Charpentier. OCLC 762341977.
- Noël, Edouard; Edmond Stoullig (1887). Les annales du théâtre et de la musique: 1886 (in French). Paris: G. Charpentier. OCLC 762306241.
- Noël, Edouard; Edmond Stoullig (1888). Les annales du théâtre et de la musique: 1887 (in French). Paris: G. Charpentier. OCLC 762314076.
- Traubner, Richard (2003). Operetta: A Theatrical History. London: Routledge. ISBN 978-0-415-96641-2.
