= Marie Grisier-Montbazon =

French actress

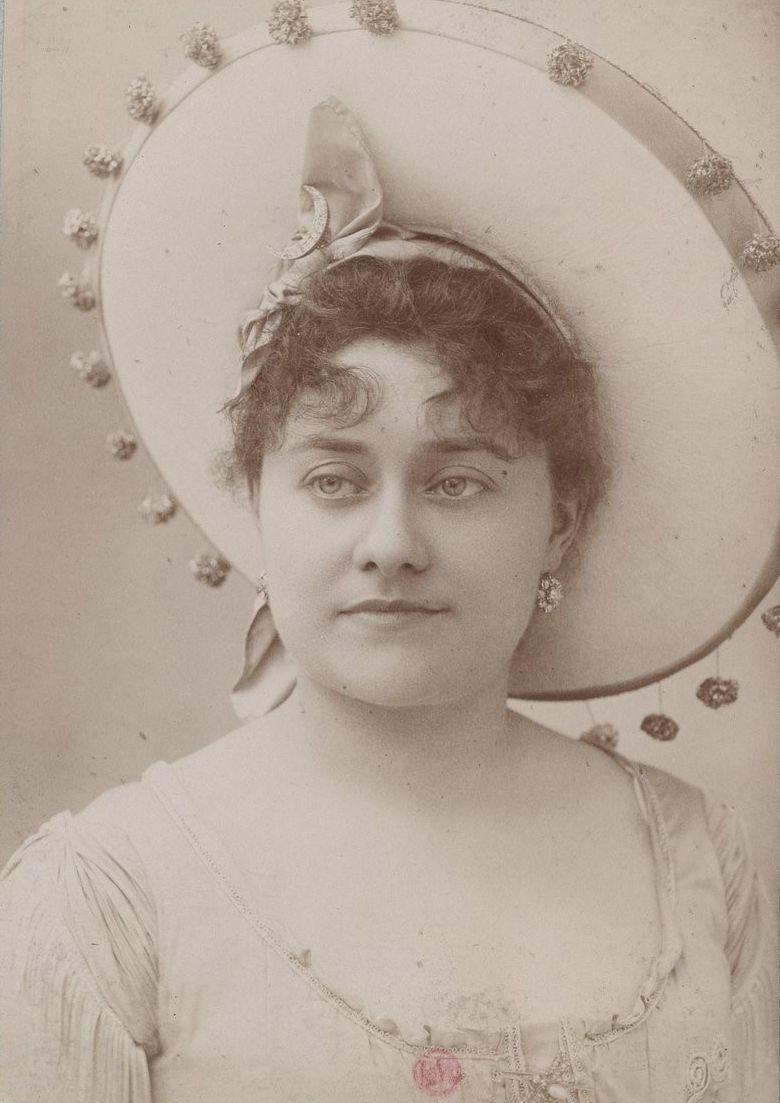
Marie Grisier-Montbazon, Théâtre des Folies-Dramatiques, 1886, Photograph Atelier Nadar.

Marie Grisier-Montbazon (née Marie-Rose Livergne (29 January 1859 − 18 October 1922), sometimes called Marie Montbazon, was a French actress and singer.

== Life ==
Born in Avignon, Montbazon was the daughter of Hippolyte Livergne, an actor known as Montbazon, and Emilie Hody, also an actress.

She was a singer (mezzo-soprano) and operetta actress (a star of the operetta firmament! ) who had brilliant success in the theatre since she played the role of Bettina in the comic opera (in 3 acts) La Mascotte by Henri Chivot and Alfred Duru at the Théâtre des Bouffes-Parisiens in December 1880, for which the composer Edmond Audran, a fellow student of Ménager and Camille Saint-Saëns, had composed the music. Montbazon, throughout her career, always dragged behind her this role which she played eight hundred times in Paris, in the provinces or abroad and which was always demanded of her, on all stages, despite the precaution she took of specifying on her engagements that she would not play La Mascotte.

On all the stages where she appeared, Montbazon knew how to make herself appreciated in all the roles she played. In her role of Gillette, thanks to her well timbred mezzo voice, Montbazon was highly acclaimed and without being comparable to that of "La Mascotte", the success of Gillette de Narbonne was real and if this opera, in our capital (Paris), has not been performed since 1935, it has remained for a long time in the repertoire of provincial theatres.

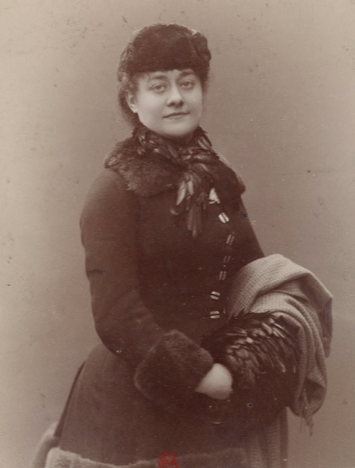
Marie Grisier-Montbazon (atelier Nadar)

She died on 18 October 1922 at her home, 10 rue des Bons Enfants in Bois-Colombes at the age of 63.

== Theatrical roles ==
- Bettina in La Mascotte, comic opera in 3 acts from the libretto by Alfred Duru and Henri Chivot, music by Edmond Audran, performed at the Théâtre des Bouffes-Parisiens in 1880
- Gilette, in Gillette de Narbonne, comic opera in 3 acts based on the libretto by Henri Chivot, Alfred Duru, music by Edmond Audran, performed at the Théâtre des Bouffes-Parisiens in 1882.
- Mam'zelle Crénom in Mam'zelle Crénom, operetta in 3 acts after the libretto by Adolphe Jaime and Georges Duval, music by Léon Vasseur, performed at the Théâtre des Bouffes-Parisiens in 1887.
- Chloé in Le Valet de cœur, operetta in 3 acts, libretto by Paul Ferrier and Charles Clairville, music by Raoul Pugno, performed at the Théâtre des Bouffes-Parisiens in 1888.
- Anita in Les Aventures de Monsieur de Crac, a fairy tale in four acts and twenty-five scenes by Ernest Blum and Raoul Toché, performed at the Théâtre du Châtelet 19 April 1886.

== Filmography ==
- 1917: Par la vérité by Maurice de Féraudy
- 1917: La Villa bleue by Jean-Joseph Renaud
- 1918: Un roman d'amour et d'aventures by René Hervil and Louis Mercanton
- 1921: Miarka, la fille à l'ourse by Louis Mercanton
- 1921: La Maison vide by Raymond Bernard : Marie
- 1922: Les Roquevillard by Julien Duvivier
- 1923: La Souriante Madame Beudet by Germaine Dulac : the maid
