= Les Cent Vierges =

Opérette in three acts with music by Charles Lecocq

Poster for a 1910 revival

Les Cent Vierges (The Hundred Maidens or The Hundred Virgins) is an opérette in three acts, with music by Charles Lecocq and a libretto by Clairville, Henri Chivot and Alfred Duru. It was first produced at the Théâtre des Fantaisies-Parisiennes, Brussels, on 16 March 1872. The plot concerns the British government's efforts to ship brides out to a distant colony for the all-male colonists. Two French women are accidentally on board the ship taking the brides out, and are pursued to the island by their husbands. The four French intruders are threatened by the colonial governor, but after plotting and farcical goings-on, all ends satisfactorily.

The work was rewritten many years after the deaths of its authors and composer, and staged in a version by Albert Willemetz and André Mouëzy-Éon in Paris in 1942 and 1946.

== Background ==
During the Second Empire, Jacques Offenbach had dominated the sphere of comic opera in France, and Lecocq had struggled for recognition. Defeat in the Franco-Prussian War in 1870 brought the Empire down, and Offenbach, who was inextricably associated with it in the public mind, became unpopular and went briefly into exile. Lecocq's rise coincided with Offenbach's temporary eclipse. Before the war his only substantial success had been Fleur-de-Thé (Tea-flower) a three-act opéra-bouffe in 1868. After moving to Brussels at the start of the war, he began composing for the Théâtre des Fantaisies-Parisiennes there. Les Cent Vierges was the first of the three pieces he wrote for the house, before moving back to Paris in 1874, all great box-office successes.

== History ==
The opera was first performed at the Théâtre des Fantaisies-Parisiennes, Brussels on 16 March 1872. A production opened in Paris, at the Théâtre des Variétés, on 13 May 1872. In Brussels the piece was a hit from the outset; the first Paris run was a modest success, and it was not until its first revival in 1875 that the opera became highly popular with the Parisian public.

== Original casts ==
Anna Van Ghell as Gabrielle, Paris 1872

Role	Brussels, March 1872	Paris, May 1872
Le duc Anatole de Quillembois	Mario Widmer	Jean-François Berthelier
Sir Jonathan Plupersonn	Alfred Jolly	Jean-Laurent Kopp
Poulardot	Charlier	Paul Hittemans
Brididick	Nardin	Léonce
Crockley	Durieu	Blondelet
Captain Thomson	Haly	Alexandre Michel
Gabrielle	Gentien	Anna Van Ghell
Eglantine	Delorme	G. Gauthier
Fanny	Dubouchet	Alice Regnault
Paquerette	Debeer	A. Schneider

== Synopsis ==
Act 1
London: an inn

Jeanne Thibault as Gabrielle and Eugène Paravicini as Anatole in Paris revival, 1885

Thibault with Paravicini as the disguised Anatole

Captain Thompson of the Royal Navy tells of Green Island, a distant English possession where there are a hundred male settlers, but no women. Female company had been sent for, but the ship containing the prospective brides never reached its destination. Today a second attempt will be made, and a hundred young women must be enlisted and embarked.

Visitors to London staying at the inn include Duke Anatole de Quillembois and his wife Gabrielle, on honeymoon, and a prosperous French bourgeois couple, M. Poulardot and his wife Eglantine, who have attached themselves to the duke and duchess, to the ducal couple's annoyance. The duke in particular wants to be left alone with his bride to begin their honeymoon.

The husbands leave to take care of the luggage, while the two women decide to visit one of the vessels at the quay – the one on which the maidens are to be carried. Their request to visit is confused with an act of enlistment and Gabrielle and Eglantine are led to the ship in the company of the volunteer wives. When Anatole and Poulardot reappear, it is to learn that their two wives have sailed for Green Island where they will be expected to take a husband.

Act 2
Green Island

The Governor, Sir Jonathan Plupersonn, and his secretary, Brididick, sympathise with, and indeed share, the frustration of the love-starved colonists. Finally a ship arrives. But it holds only 19 women – including Eglantine and Gabrielle. The rest have jumped ship at stopovers. Anatole and Poulardot have sailed in pursuit; they hide to listen and see without being seen. Gabrielle and Eglantine protest and firmly refuse to be married again. The virtue of their wives comforts the two, but their contentment is short-lived: the Governor announces that if the women's husbands come to the island, they will be thrown into the sea. Moments later both husbands have the opportunity to make themselves known to their wives, and a plan is concocted. Poulardot and Anatole, disguised as women, are presented to the Governor as mother and daughter. The allocation of the available brides takes place by drawing lots. The wives are drawn by two colonists; Anatole and Poulardot find themselves engaged to marry the Governor and his secretary.

Act 3
The Governor's Lodge

The wedding party brings together Plupersonn, Brididick, Anatole and Poulardot. Anatole and Poulardot set upon their supposed new husbands and lock themselves in their bridal chamber. Gabrielle and Eglantine do likewise with their two "spouses". and then disguise themselves as men. They are joined by Anatole and Poulardot who no longer hide their true identity. The Governor insists that they must be thrown into the sea. While Eglantine leads an insurrection on the island, Gabrielle tries to seduce the Governor to buy time. Plupersonn, while suspecting the stratagem, delays the execution. Tension rises on the island, but the unexpected arrival of the lost first ship puts an end to all attempts at rebellion. Every man will have his bride, and the four protagonists look forward to billing and cooing in Paris.

Source: Opérette – Théâtre Musical.

== Numbers ==
Act 1

- Overture
- Chorus of drinkers: "Vive le gin, vive la bière!" (Hooray for gin, hooray for beer!)
- Ariette: "J'ai la tête romanesque" ("I have a romantic head" – Gabrielle)
- Duet: "Dans les forêts de l'Amérique" ("In the forests of America" – Anatole, Gabrielle )
- Quintet: "Un turbot?" ("A turbot?" – Anatole, Gabrielle, Poulardot, Eglantine, Crockley)
- Chorus: "Voici le moment de l'enrôlement" ("This is the moment of enlistment")
- Duet: "Nous allons le voir, ce joli navire" ("We'll see it, this pretty ship" – Gabrielle and Eglantine)

Act 2

- Couplets "Sans femme" ("Without woman" – Brididick, Plupersonn)
- Ensemble: "Au bonheur, à la joie, aujourd'hui livrons-nous" ("To happiness and joy, let us yield today" – Chorus, Gabrielle, Eglantine, Anatole, Poulardot)
- Ensemble: "Il faut obéir à la loi" ("You must obey the law" – Plupersonn, Gabrielle, Eglantine)
- Ensemble: "Allez mes tourterelles" ("Go my turtledoves" – Plupersonn, Brididick, colonists, maidens)
- Quatuor: "Silence! Silence!" ("Silence! Silence! – Anatole, Poulardot, Eglantine, Gabrielle)
- Waltz song: "Je soupire et maudis le destin" (I sigh and curse my fate – Gabrielle)
- Ballad: "O Paris, gai séjour" ("O, Paris, gay sojourning-place" – Gabrielle)
- Couplets: "Un petit coup" ("A little drink" – Anatole)
- Finale

Act 3

- Chorus: "Pour faire honneur au gouverneur" ("To honour the governor")
- Quartet: "A table, chassons l'humeur noire" ("At table, let's ban ill humour" – Plupersonn, Brididick, Anatole, Poulardot)
- Duet and ensemble: "Ah! Monsieur le secrétaire" ("Ah! Mr Secretary" – Eglantine, Gabrielle, chorus )
- Déclaration: "Je t'aime ("I love you" – Gabrielle, Pluperson )
- Finale

Source: Opérette – Théâtre Musical.

== Revivals and adaptations ==
In October 1872 The Musical Standard reported that Les Cent Vierges had been staged in Toulouse, Lyon, Lille, and Le Havre, and would be produced in the next few months in Bordeaux, Amiens, Nice, Marseille, Limoges, Grenoble, Algiers, Nimes, Troyes, Madrid, and Vienna. The piece was staged in Italy in May 1872. In December of that year it was given (in French) at the Olympic Theatre, New York. The Brussels company took the production to London in June 1873, with the original cast, except that Pauline Luigini replaced Gentien as Gabrielle.

Two English adaptations were staged in London in 1874 under the titles To the Green Isles Direct and The Island of Bachelors, the latter a Gaiety Theatre production with Arthur Cecil as Anatole, Constance Loseby as Gabrielle and Nellie Farren as Eglantine.

The opera was revived in Paris in 1885 in its original version. In 1942, at the Apollo, Paris, a new version was presented. The text, by Albert Willemetz and André Mouëzy-Éon, reduced the number of acts to two, rearranged the order of the musical numbers, turned the island from a British colony to a French one, and renamed some of the characters. The story remained broadly the same, but introduced a new character, a young painter, Marcel, who is in love with Gabrielle and eventually gets her when Anatole decides that marriage is not for him. This production starred Germaine Roger as Gabrielle. The revised version was revived in Paris in 1946.

== Reception ==
Reviewing the Brussels production, the critic in The Athenaeum praised the "melodious and vivacious" music, and forecast success for the piece when it opened in Paris, where laughing at the English was always popular. (Note: In Paris "les Anglais pour rire will be always welcome".) Another critic from the same paper described the music of the first act as "quite Offenbachish", but thought Lecocq was reaching for a more elevated style in some of the numbers. He singled out Gabrielle's arietta "J'ai la tête romanesque", the waltz-song "Je soupire et maudis le destin", and the air "Je t'aime". He also remarked on the composer's resourceful use of the limited orchestral sources available to him. (Note: The orchestra consisted of one each of flute, piccolo, oboe, clarinet and bassoon; two horns, cornets and trombones; strings and percussion.) The critic in The Musical World also praised the waltz-song, and observed that it was the most popular number with audiences. In the first volume of his Operetta (2015), Robert Letellier describes the piece as "very much of its day: scabrous situations, scenes of exaggerated burlesque, an absence of all verisimilitude, and all acceptable feeling".

== Notes, references and sources ==
=== Sources ===
- Faris, Alexander (1980). Jacques Offenbach. London: Faber & Faber. ISBN 978-0-571-11147-3.
- Gänzl, Kurt; Andrew Lamb (1988). Gänzl's Book of the Musical Theatre. London: The Bodley Head. OCLC 966051934.
- Letellier, Robert (2015). Operetta: A Sourcebook. Volume I. Newcastle: Cambridge Scholars Publishing. ISBN 978-1-4438-6690-3.
- Yon, Jean-Claude [in French] (2000). Jacques Offenbach (in French). Paris: Gallimard. ISBN 978-2-07-074775-7.
