= Le grand mogol =

Opéra bouffe by Edmond Audran

Poster for 1884 Paris production

Le grand mogol is an opéra bouffe in four acts with music by Edmond Audran. The opera depicts the love between an Indian prince and a young Parisienne, and the unsuccessful attempts of conspirators to thwart their romance.

The piece exists in two versions. The first, in three acts, with words by Henri Chivot, was produced at the Théâtre du Gymnase, Marseille, on 24 February 1877. A revised four-act version, with words by Chivot and Alfred Duru, was given at the Théâtre de la Gaîté, Paris, on 19 September 1884.

== Background and first productions ==
In the 1860s and into the 1870s Edmond Audran was a church organist and choirmaster in Marseille. He composed some one-act opéras comiques in the 1860s, but they attracted little attention, and he did not return to the genre until the mid-1870s when Henri Chivot, a family friend, wrote a libretto, Le grand mogol, and invited Audran to set it. The work was accepted by the Théâtre Gymnase, Marseille. The leading lady was the 18-year-old Jane Hading, who soon became a star of light opera in Paris. The opera opened on 24 February 1877 and ran for 60 performances – a run of rare length for a provincial French theatre of the time.

After this, Audran gave up his church post and moved to Paris, where he soon had a solid success with his opéra comique Les noces d'Olivette (1879), which ran for over a year in London, and extended his international fame with La mascotte (1880). In the mid-1880s, together with Chivot and the playwright Alfred Duru, Audran revised and expanded Le grand mogol as an opéra-bouffe in four acts. The new version was produced on 19 September 1884 at the Théâtre de la Gaîté, where it ran for 248 performances.

== Original cast ==
Crakson: costume design by Draner

Except for Jane Hading as Irma, Les Annales du théâtre et de la musique give no details of the 1877 Marseille cast. The 1884 Paris cast was:

- Prince Mignapour – M. Cooper
- Joquelet, travelling dentist – M. Alexandre
- Nicobar, grand vizier – M. Mesmaker
- Madras, innkeeper – M. Gobereau
- Palace officer – M. Berville
- Captain Crakson – M. Scipion
- Irma – Mme. Thuillier-Leloir
- Princess Bengaline – Mlle. Gélabert

Source: Libretto.

== Synopsis ==
In some printed editions of the final Paris version the second and third acts are joined together, and Act IV becomes Act III. The opera is set in the Kingdom of Delhi in 1750.

Act I

Design for Act I

A public square in Almora, near Delhi

At the court of the Great Moguls, the custom is that the Crown Princes must remain chaste until they reach the age of majority, on pain of losing their rights to the throne. The prince must at all times wear a magical white pearl necklace, which will turn black if he strays from the path of virtue.

It is two days until Prince Mignapour reaches the age of majority and ascends the throne. He is less concerned about his accession than about finding Irma, a young Frenchwoman he met two months ago and fell in love with. Irma and her brother, Joquelet, have fled from France to avoid their creditors. He has become a travelling dentist and she a snake charmer. Mignapour finds Irma in Almora and declares his love; she willingly accepts his proposal of marriage.

There are three people unhappy about the betrothal. Princess Bengaline, the prince's cousin, is ambitious to be his wife and share the throne; the Grand Vizier, Nicobar, has pinned his political future on Bengaline's plans; and Captain Crakson, an unattractive English officer, is in love with Irma.

Act II
The palace gardens

Crakson, Bengaline and Nicobar plot to prevent the marriage of Irma and the prince. They decide to prevent his accession to the throne by leading him to lose his innocence. Bengaline and her retinue of bayadères surround the young man, and nearly provoke him to a kiss, but the sudden intrusion of Joquelet prevents it in the nick of time.

Mignapour tries to persuade Irma to meet him in the rose garden at midnight. She does not agree, but he lives in hope. At night he is in the care of bodyguards whom he cannot elude. He asks Crakson, who has access to supplies, to drug the guards. Crakson does so, but keen to have Irma to himself, he drugs Mignapour too, and while the latter is unconscious, Crakson swaps the white necklace for a black one, before going to meet Irma in the garden. Unfortunately for the plotters, Bengaline has had a similar idea, and it is she, disguised as Irma, whom Crakson meets in the rose garden. Neither realises the real identity of the other.

Act III
A hall in the palace

Before the wedding of his sister, Joquelet tactfully attempts to explain what is expected of a bride. After a ballet, Prince Mignapour finally appears, but, to the amazement of all, his necklace has turned black. It is assumed that he has lapsed from virtue. Nicobar reveals that the guards saw someone answering to the prince's appearance embracing a woman in the rose garden. There is uproar and the prince is ejected from the palace.

Act IV
The hall of a caravanserai

Joquelet finds an old casket. When it is finally opened, after much difficulty, it is found to contain a document which reveals that earlier Great Moguls invented the myth of the magic necklace to keep their heirs on the path of virtue. Bengaline had earlier found the casket, thus learning the facts, and then disposed of it. But when it falls into the hands of Joquelet it becomes clear to all that the black necklace has no significance whatever. Mignapour will become Grand Mogul and can marry his little Parisienne. Bengaline attempts to stop the marriage by telling how she trysted with Mignapour in the rose garden, but when it emerges that she actually met Crakson she finds to her fury that she is obliged to marry him.

Source: Libretto and Gänzl's Book of the Musical Theatre.

== Numbers ==
Act I

- Overture
- Chorus and song (Chorus, Joquelet) –"Allons et point de paresse … Mon nom est Joquelet" – Come on, no idleness … My name is Joquelet
- Couplets (Irma) –"Je ne veux pas de vous pour époux " – I do not want you for a husband
- Narration (Irma) –"Si le prince, m'a-t-on conté" – If the prince, so I am told
- Chorus and couplets (Chorus, Bengaline) –"Place à Bengaline … J'aime l'éclat des cours" – Make way for Bengaline … I love the brilliance of the court
- Duet (Mignapour, Bengaline) –"Je voudrais révéler à la nature entière" – I would like to reveal the whole nature
- Romance (Mignapour) –"Si j'étais un petit serpent" – If I were a little snake
- Finale (Irma, all) –"Pour voir Irma … Allons, petit serpent" – To see Irma … Come on, little snake

Acte II

- Entr'acte
- Buffo trio (Crakson, Nicobar, Bengaline) –"Si le Prince se marie" – If the Prince gets married
- Couplets (Bengaline) –"Qu'on me laisse agir à mon gré" – Let me act as I please
- Duet (Joquelet, Irma) –"Dans ce beau palais de Delhi" – In this beautiful palace of Delhi
- Couplets (Mignapour) –"Un antique et fort vieil adage" – An old, very old adage
- Chorus of bayadères and song (Chorus, Bengaline) –"Nous sommes prêtresses d'Indra … L'indolente panthère" – We are Priestesses of Indra … The lazy Panther
- Chorus and couplets (Chorus, Irma) –"Sur l'ordre de sa hautesse … Dans nos guingettes de Paris" – On the order of His Highness … In our Parisian bars
- Finale (All) –"Le jour viens de finir" – The day has just finished

Acte III

- Chorus – "Gardiens du palais" – Guardians of the palace
- Chorus – "O soleil, quand de tes feux" – O sun, when your fires
- Couplets (Joquelet) –"Au moment de te marier" – When you get married
- Finale (All) –"Silence! le voici qui s'avance … Pardon, je ne suis éveillé qu'à demi" – Silence! He is coming … I'm sorry, I'm half awake

Act IV

- Entr'acte
- Chorus –"Après les pénibles voyages" – After painful journeys
- Song (Joquelet) –"Petite sœur, il faut sécher tes larmes" – Little sister, you must dry your tears
- Song (Mignapour) –"Par tout le pays, je chemine" – Throughout the country I walk
- Duet (Mignapour, Irma) –"O ma maîtresse bien aimée" – O my beloved mistress
- Couplets (Bengaline) –"A la femme en naissant" – To the woman at birth
- Quartet (Irma, Mignapour, Crakson, Joquelet) –"Ah! pour moi quelle heureuse chance" – Ah! for me, what a happy chance
- Finale (All) –"D'où vient un pareil tapage" – What is all the fuss?

Source: Opérette – Théâtre Musical.

== Revivals and adaptations ==
The Gaîté staged seven revivals of the piece between 1885 and 1915. There was a new production at the Théâtre des Folies-Dramatiques in 1922. In 1949 the Grand Théâtre de Genève presented a new version in two acts; this production was then seen in Paris at the Gaîté. During the 2002–2003 season the Théâtre Odéon, Marseille, staged a revival.

An English production opened at the Comedy Theatre, London, on 17 November 1884. The adaptation was by H. B. Farnie, who substantially rewrote the book. The device of the pearl necklace was retained, but the plot was radically altered and new characters introduced, including a comic Frenchman played by Frank Wyatt; Joquelet and Irma became an English pair, Charley Jones and his girlfriend Emma (Fred Leslie and Florence St John) who adopt the Indian personas Ayala and Djemma. The aspect of the piece most remarked on was that St John used real snakes in her snake-charming scene. Otherwise the piece was tepidly received and closed after eight weeks.

The first American production was in 1881 at the Bijou Opera House on Broadway, in Farnie's version, starring Lillian Russell and Selina Dolaro. There were three revivals there between 1882 and 1887. A German production was staged in Berlin in 1885.

== Critical reception ==
Reviewing the Paris premiere Les Annales du théâtre et de la musique found the libretto lightweight, sustained by Audran's "primitive" music and the splendid staging. The reviewer of The Era wrote:

The libretto is gay and sometimes witty, though MM. Chivot and Duru have often written brighter dialogue. The situations, if not quite novel, afford opportunities for mise-en-scène and much scope to the musician. M. Audran has seized it to indulge in his usual sentimentality, and his personages – not excepting the terrible dentist – warble tender ditties from one end of the score to the other. I shall best describe the music by saying that it is very 'nice', and this quality is also its principal drawback.

Reviewing the London adaptation, William Beatty-Kingston wrote in The Theatre, "There is not a spontaneous or unaffected melody in the whole work … a dull work of minute intrinsic value." The Times expressed regret that so intelligent an artist as Florence St John should have let herself be involved in so inane a spectacle, and added, "M. Audran's score is as feeble as the action it serves to illustrate".

== References and sources ==
=== Sources ===
- Chivot, Henri; Alfred Duru (1923) [1884]. Le grand mogul, Opéra-bouffe en quatre actes. Paris: Stock. OCLC 494799580.
- Gänzl, Kurt; Andrew Lamb (1988). Gänzl's Book of the Musical Theatre. London: The Bodley Head. OCLC 966051934.
- Noël, Edouard; Edmond Stoullig (1885). Les annales du théâtre et de la musique: 1884 (in French). Paris: G. Charpentier. OCLC 68567504.

=== Further reading ===
- Gänzl, Kurt (2001). "Le Grand Mogol". The Encyclopedia of the Musical Theatre. Vol. II (second ed.). New York: Schirmer Books. OCLC 45715912.
