= Surcouf (opéra comique) =

French opéra comique

Poster for first production, 1887

Surcouf is a French opéra comique in three acts and a prologue, music by Robert Planquette, libretto by Henri Chivot and Alfred Duru, premiered on 6 October 1887 at the Théâtre des Folies-Dramatiques in Paris. It ran for a modestly successful 96 performances.

An English version was given in London at the Prince of Wales Theatre in January 1889, under the title Paul Jones, in an adaptation by H. B. Farnie. This version did better at the box-office than the original Paris production, running in the West End for most of 1889, and being staged subsequently around the British Isles and in Australia and the US.

== Background and first performance ==
Planquette had come to national and international notice ten years earlier, with his opéra comique Les cloches de Corneville (1877), which broke box-office records in Paris and London. Over the succeeding decade he had some further successes but nothing to match that of the 1877 work. Chivot and Duru were an experienced team of librettists who had written the words for successes by Charles Lecocq and Edmond Audran. This was the only work on which the three collaborated.

The librettists took as their central character a real historical figure, Robert Surcouf, a French privateer of the period during and after the French Revolution. The first performance of the opera was at the Théâtre des Folies-Dramatiques on 6 October 1887, where it ran until 27 December, a total of 96 performances, a reasonable run for the period, but not a spectacular success.

== Original cast ==
Gobin, Morlet and Guiton fils in original 1887 production

- Robert Surcouf – Louis-Auguste Morlet
- Kerbiniou – M. Montrouge
- Gargousse – Charles Constant Gobin
- Flageolet – A. Guiton fils
- MacFarlane – M. Duhamel
- Thompson – M. Marcelin
- Marcof – M. Riga
- Paimboeuf – M. Speck
- William – M. Gelly
- Harry – M. Milot
- Arabelle – J. Darcourt
- Yvonne – Mdlle. Darcelle
- Madame Paimboeuf – Mdlle. Barthe
- Agathe – Mdlle. Sarah

Source: The Era.

== Synopsis ==
=== Prologue ===
The prologue is set in 1798 in the Channel port of Saint-Malo, where the historical Surcouf was born. He is first portrayed as a young man, employed by a rich shipowner called Kerbiniou. Surcouf loves his employer's niece, Yvonne, but Kerbiniou forbids the marriage because Surcouf has no money. Resolving to earn enough to marry Yvonne, Surcouf volunteers for service in a privateer ship commanded by Maroof. Yvonne promises to wait for his return if he comes back within four years.

=== Act I ===
Surcouf returns to Saint-Malo with his new riches

Four years have elapsed and an uneasy peace prevails between Britain and France. Surcouf has not returned; he is rumoured to be dead. Yvonne has remained faithful to her vow. Kerbiniou has married a young English widow, Arabelle, who has encouraged Yvonne to marry another Briton, Captain Thompson of the Royal Navy. Surcouf returns, vastly enriched by booty captured from British ships. But Yvonne is away, on a pilgrimage. Being a native of perfidious Albion Madame Kerbiniou, determined that her niece by marriage will marry Thompson, spins Surcouf a false story, telling him that Yvonne has already married the Englishman. Infuriated, Surcouf challenges Thompson to a duel. Before the duel can take place, Yvonne returns and the truth is discovered. Thompson, learning that France and Britain are now once again at war has his men ambush and overpower Surcouf. The British government has put a price on Surcouf's head, and he is carried on board Thompson's ship, which sets sail for England. Two of Surcouf's crew, Gargousse and Flageolet, having witnessed the kidnapping alert their shipmates and the pirate corvette sets off in hot pursuit of the British ship. Yvonne, anxious to join her lover, is on board.

=== Act II ===
The action takes place in a British Channel port, commanded by the preposterous and dim-witted Major MacFarlane. He is Arabelle Kebiniou's uncle, and she is in the town. Surcouf breaks free of his captors but in his flight he meets Arabelle. She is about to call the troops when he tells her that they are older acquaintances than she realises. It was he who rescued her from a crocodile while she was bathing in Sumatra. Arabelle ceases to be his enemy and becomes his firm friend. To protect him she introduces him to Major MacFarlane as her husband. When Kerbiniou appears on the scene MacFarlane takes him for the missing pirate and has him arrested. Captain Thompson's arrival clears up the error and Surcouf is arrested in Kerbiniou's place. Before he can be led to prison his men arrive, overcome the incompetent and cowardly English, and march off in triumph with their chief to their ship.

=== Act III ===
The final act is set at sea. Thompson's frigate pursues the privateers' corvette, but the plucky Frenchmen win the ensuing battle, capture the frigate and sail it into Saint-Malo. Surcouf's marriage to Yvonne concludes the opera.

Source: The Era.

== Numbers ==
Costumes for Surcouf and Gargousse

Costumes for Thompson and Arabelle

Costumes for Kerbiniou and Yvonne

- Prologue
  - Introduction and chorus – Holà, Matelots
  - Duet – Moi je suis Gargousse et moi Flageolet
  - Chorus – Allons Robert
  - Couplets de Surcouf – Chacun Ia voit à ma mine
  - Couplets d'Yvonne – Ayez foi dans l'avenir
  - Finale – On va mettre à la voile
- Act I
  - Entr'acte
  - Rondeau-valse (Arabelle) – J'avais emmené ma négresse
  - Prayer (Yvonne and chorus) – Sainte-Anne en qui j'espère
  - Chorus – Oui, c'est lui notre fameux corsaire
  - Air de Surcouf – Oui, c'est mol mes amis
  - Trio (Arabelle, Kerbiniou and Thompson) – Bravo, j'ai tout entendu
  - Duet (Yvonne and Surcouf) – Vous avez douté de moi
  - Finale – Entendez-vous
- Act II
  - Entr'acte
  - Chorus of servants – Pour que chacun puisse faire
  - Couplets d'Arabelle – Mon premier était d'un blond fade
  - Duet (Arabelle, Surcouf) – C'est lui, le corsaire
  - Buffo duet (Gargousse and Flageolet) – Belle Italie
  - Chorus of guests – Puisque l'on nous invite
  - Ensemble – O surprise étonnante
  - Waltz – Tournoyons les valsons
  - Chorus – Nous sommes pleins d'impatience
  - Finale – Un lâche, ah c'est assez
    - Air de Surcouf – Bonsoir Angleterre
- Act III
  - Entr'acte
  - Duet (Yvonne, Surcouf) – Vogue, vogue, léger navire
  - Couplets (Gargousse) – Dedans l'Inde ou règne Angleterre
  - Air de Surcouf – Mon navire c'est beau
  - Finale – Amis que dans St-Malo

== English version: Paul Jones ==
Agnes Huntington in the title role in Paul Jones, the English adaptation of Surcouf, 1889

A Parisian critic observed after the premiere at the Folies-Dramatiques that the "patriotic bunkum" of the plot of the opera was calculated to appeal to French audiences but was unlikely to go down well in London. The critic speculated that the exaggerated anti-English sentiments might be the authors' revenge for the supposed slight to French naval courage in the "Poor parley-voo" song in Gilbert and Sullivan's Ruddigore premiered in London earlier that year. For the English version of Surcouf, to which Planquette contributed some new numbers, the plot was completely overhauled. The adapter, H. B. Farnie, cut the prologue entirely and eliminated the Anglo-French hostilities. He also reverted to an old tradition that Gilbert and Sullivan had striven to get away from: cross-dress casting – the hero in this version was sung by the American contralto Agnes Huntington.

In the London version, entitled Paul Jones, the hero (a fictionalised version of the Scottish-American sailor John Paul Jones) is an apprentice to Bicoquet, a ship's chandler in Saint-Malo. He loves his employer's niece, Yvonne, but she is already being wooed by Don Rufino, a rich and well-connected Spanish naval officer. Paul is told that if he can earn a million francs he will be considered as an alternative suitor. Kestrel, the American captain of a privateer ship comes to Saint-Malo to recruit crew members. Paul, together with two locals, Bouillabaisse and Piere, joins him. Three years pass. Bicoquet has married Rufino's sister, and Yvonne is on the point of being married to Rufino. Paul returns in time, having gained the necessary money by piracy, but Rufino has him taken prisoner. The last act shifts the scene to the island of Estella where the governor, Don Trocadero, is expecting his nephew Rufino. Bricocquet arrives, and as Paul is rumoured to have escaped Bricoquet is taken for him and arrested. Paul and his crew arrive and overpower the Spaniards, and he is then able to marry Yvonne.

The piece opened at the Prince of Wales Theatre on 13 January 1889. The principal members of the London cast were:

- Paul Jones – Agnes Huntington
- Rufino – George Preston
- Bicoquet – Henry Ashley
- Don Trocadero – Frank Wyatt
- Kestrel – Templar Saxe
- Bouillabaisse – Harry Monkhouse
- Petit Pierre – Albert James
- Yvonne – Miss Wadman
- Madame Bouillabaisse – Phyllis Broughton
- Malaguera – Kate Cutler

Source: The Era.

The piece ran, with some cast changes, until mid-December. Carl Rosa, who presented the piece in London, assembled a second company that toured the work in the British Isles. At various stages in the tour the leading role was sung by a baritone rather than a female singer. This version was played in Australia from March 1890. Agnes Huntington starred in a production of the work in New York in April 1891.

== Sources ==
- Noël, Édouard; Edmond Stoullig (1888). Les annales du théatre et de la musique, 1887. Paris: Charpentier. OCLC 10740989.
- Williams, Carolyn (2011). Gilbert and Sullivan: Gender, Genre, Parody. New York and Chichester: Columbia University Press. ISBN 978-0-231-14804-7.
