= Gillette de Narbonne =

French opera by Alfred Duru and Henri Chivot

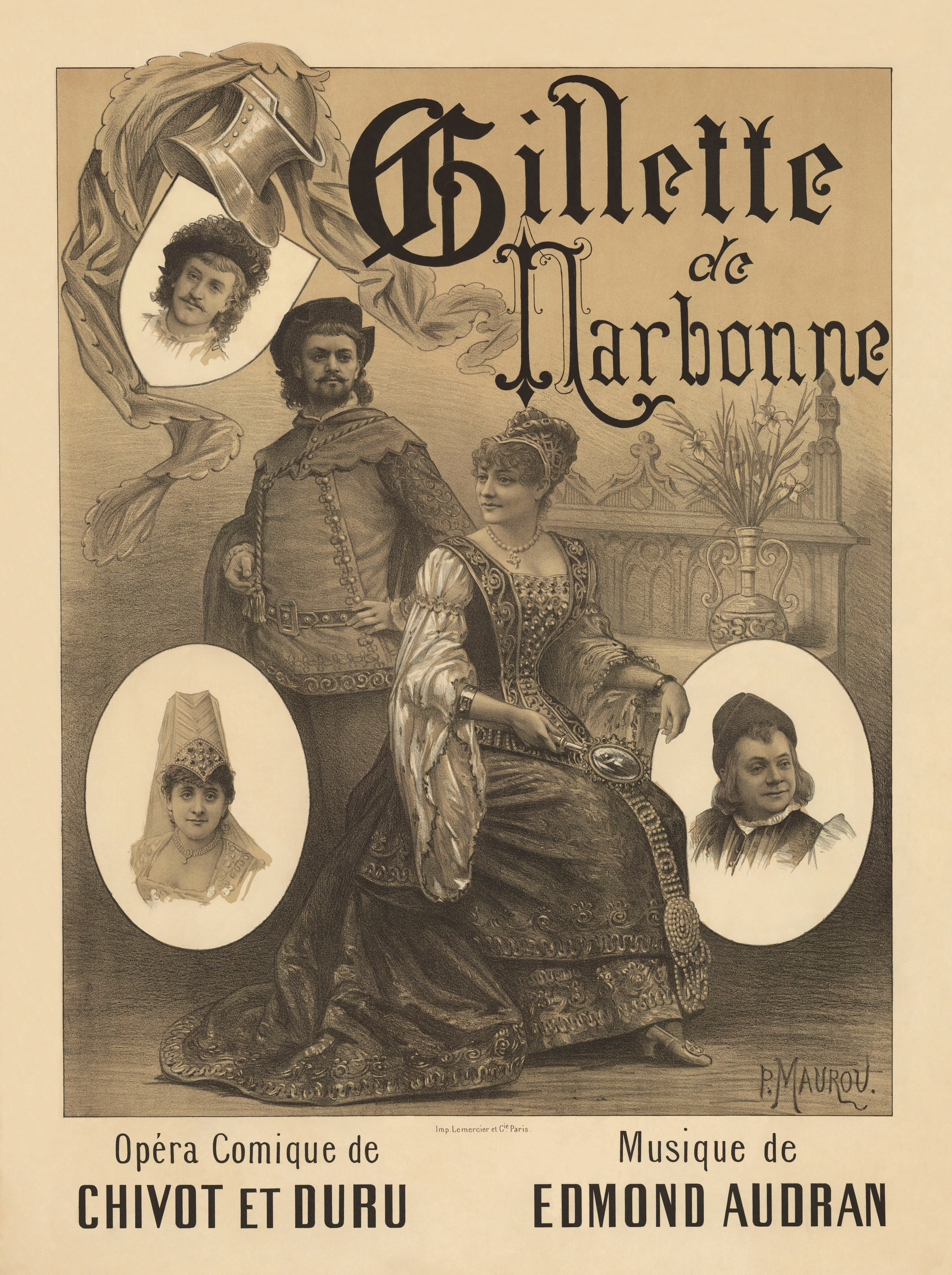
Poster by Paul Maurou for the original production.

Gillette de Narbonne is an opéra comique in three acts, with music by Edmond Audran and words by Alfred Duru and Henri Chivot. It is based on a fabliau from The Decameron. It depicts a rejected bride posing as another woman to deceive her husband into consummating their marriage.

The first performance was on 11 November 1882 at the Théâtre des Bouffes-Parisiens, Paris, where it ran for 122 performances, until the following March. Productions followed in London, where the piece failed to run, and Berlin, where it was more successful.

== Background and first performance ==
In the 1850s the Théâtre des Bouffes-Parisiens had been celebrated for its association with Jacques Offenbach. It had declined in the 1860s, but under a new director, Louis Cantin, appointed in 1877, it made a strong recovery. In 1880 Cantin staged Louis Varney's Les mousquetaires au couvent which played for more than 250 performances - a very good run for the time - followed by Edmond Audran's La mascotte, which was given more than 450 times in 1881 and 1882. The replacement for La mascotte, Varney's Coquelicot, made little impression, and Cantin turned again to Audran and his regular librettists, Alfred Duru and Henri Chivot.

The authors based their plot on the story from The Decameron on which Shakespeare based All's Well That Ends Well. They wrote for a cast largely familiar from their earlier work, including the mezzo-soprano Marie Montbazon, the tenor Charles Lamy and the baritone Louis Morlet.

The opera premiered on 11 November 1882. Without rivalling the exceptional success of La Mascotte, Gillette de Narbonne performed satisfactorily at the box office, running for 122 performances from November until the following March.

== Original cast ==
Louis Morlet as Roger

- Roger – Louis Morlet
- Olivier – Charles Lamy
- Griffardin – M. Maugé
- King René – M. Riga
- Sénéchal – M. Desmonts
- Barigoul – M. Pescheux
- Gillette – Marie Montbazon
- Richard – Paul Jorge
- Rosita – Mme. Gélabert
- Chateauneuf – Mme. Rivero
- Boislaurier – Mme. D'Arly
- Paola – Mme. Deligny

== Synopsis ==
Act I
15th-century Provence

Gillette has been brought up among the family of the young Count Roger, and when her father, a doctor of great talent, died without leaving her a penny, the little girl was adopted by Roger's mother. Gillette has long loved Roger, but he has paid little attention to her.

René, king of Provence, is afflicted with a malady that has been pronounced incurable by all his doctors. (Note: The reviewer in The Era pointed out that the librettists had prudently changed the king's affliction from an anal fistula (as in Boccaccio and Shakespeare) to terminal consumption, as the former "would have sent a Parisian audience into such titters that the fate of the operetta would have been jeopardised at the outset".) Although Gillette's father left her no money, she inherited his unique prescriptions, and she determines to save the good king's life. She goes from Narbonne to Aix with her pharmacopoea and a tambourine, paying her way by singing and dancing. She is admitted to the court and gives René a medicine that cures him within a week.

Marie Montbazon as the disguised Gillette

The king promises his young physician the gift she most wishes for in reward for her services, and Gillette replies that since coming to court she has met her old companion, Count Roger, and would like above else to marry him. Roger, a smooth and dashing philanderer, has been extremely attentive to her since her arrival at court, but has no wish whatever to marry her or anyone else. The king commands that the forthcoming church service to celebrate his recovery will also be the wedding service for Roger and Gillette. After the marriage ceremony the reluctant bridegroom refuses to consummate the marriage and leaves immediately for Naples, where war is waging. He leaves Gillette a note saying that he will never recognise her as his wife until the day when she can show him the ring he now bears on his finger, and present him with a child of which he is the acknowledged father.

Act II
An inn near Naples, a month later

Roger is accompanied by Olivier, King René's handsome son, who has come to Italy in search of action, both military and amatory. They are both greatly taken by Rosita, who is the wife of their colleague Griffardin and the niece of their host at the inn. Gillette arrives, in male clothes, masquerading as her own twin brother. She takes Rosita into her confidence. Rosita agrees to an assignation with Roger, demanding from him as the price of her compliance the ring he wears. In the darkness, Gillette replaces Rosita, and so Roger unwittingly consummates his marriage. The amorous episode is curtailed by the incursion of enemy soldiers who take Roger prisoner.

Act III
The castle of the Counts of Lignolles in Provence

Ten months later, Gillette is now the mother of a vigorous baby boy. Roger returns from captivity on the day on which King René and his court are celebrating the baptism of the heir of the Lignolles. Gillette pretends to be indifferent to Roger, who now realises how attractive she is. He is horrified because he supposes that Olivier is not only the baby's godfather but the real father. Gillette lets him fret for a while, before showing him the ring, the witness of their love. Roger kneels before his wife and swears eternal love.

== Numbers ==
Act I

- Overture
- Couplets (Olivier) "D'abord quel beau commencement" – First, what a beautiful beginning
- Chorus "Ah ! quel bonheur" – Ah! what happiness
- Provençal song (Gillette) "Il est un pays où la terre" – It is a country where the land
- Air (Roger) "A mes regards émus" – In my eyes filled with emotion
- Duo (Roger, Gillette) "Rappelez-vous nos promenades" – Remember our walks
- Chorus "Qu'un gai carillon s'élance" – Let a cheerful chime ring
- Couplets (Gillette) "Quand on atteint un certain âge" – When you reach a certain age
- Chorus "Sautons tous comme des fous" – Let us all jump like mad
- Round (Rosita, chorus) "Claudine dans notre village" – Claudine in our village
- Finale "Le Comte et Gillette ont échangé" – The Count and Gillette exchanged

Act II

- Entr'acte
- Ensemble "Ici nous trouvons un asile" – Here we find refuge
- Chorus of soldiers "Pendant que l'on chemine" – While walking
- Romance (Roger) "Elle a la figure mutine" – She has a mischievous figure
- Trio (Roger, Olivier, Rosita) "Voyez quelle tournure aimable" – See what a nice turn
- Scene "Puisque notre couvert est mis" – As our cover is in place
- Sergeant's Song (Gillette) "En avant Briquet" – Forward, Briquet!
- Turlututu couplets (Rosita) "Quand un luron me prend la taille" – When a fellow takes me by the waist
- Serenade (Olivier) "La lune blafarde" – The pale moon
- Couplets-duetto (Gillette, Roger) "A votre doigt, que vois-je donc" – On your finger, what do I see
- Finale "Ces clameurs lointaines" – These distant clamours

Act III

- Entr'acte
- Chorus "Pour le fils de la Comtesse" – For the son of the Countess
- Trio (Rosita, Chateauneuf, Boislaurier) "D'un bel enfant rose et charmant " – A beautiful, pink, charming child
- Couplets of the dodo (Rosita) "Quel plaisir, quel enivrement" – What fun, what intoxication
- Couples of the godfather (Olivier) "Permettez-moi ma commère" – Let me gossip
- Ariette (Gillette) "On m'avait dans une cage" – I was in a cage
- Song (Roger) "Mon seul bien, désormais, c'est toi" – The only good thing for me is you
- Duetto (Gillette, Roger) "Ah ! fuyons au doux pays" – Ah! let us flee to the sweet country
- Chorus and scene "Le cloche ici nous dit" – The bell tells us
- Finale "C'est d'un fabliau de Boccace" – This is a Boccaccio fabliau

== Revivals and adaptations ==
The piece was given in London in an adaptation by Henry Savile Clarke at the Royalty Theatre on 19 November 1883. The plot was bowdlerised to accommodate Victorian British sensibilities: the disguised Gillette merely trysts with her husband, and obtains the ring with no hint of the bedroom. Kate Santley was praised in the title role, but the rest of the cast was judged thoroughly inadequate. Audran's music was mildly praised, but critics thought it fell short of his score for La mascotte. Additional music by Walter Slaughter and Hamilton Clarke was added. The production closed within a month. The piece did better in Berlin, where Gillette von Narbonne ran well in 1884–1885.

The most recent production in Paris was in 1935 (with Fanély Revoil and André and Suzanne Baugé), although the work remained in the repertoire of provincial theatres in France for many years after that. The Odéon Theatre, Marseille mounted a production in 2005.

== Critical reception ==
Les Annales du Théâtre et de la Musique though finding the libretto and score weaker than those of La mascotte acknowledged that the piece had appealed to the Parisian public. The reviewer felt that the words "pretentious" and "banal" were perhaps too strong, but expressed disappointment, having expected better and more original work from Audran and his collaborators. The Paris correspondent of The Era thought more highly of the piece, judging that nothing better had appeared in Paris since La mascotte, and finding the music more poetic than anything Audran had written previously.

== Recordings ==
Complete audio and video recordings have been issued, the former conducted by Pierre Tellier and the latter by Georges Devaux.

== Notes, references and sources ==
=== Sources ===
- Audran, Edmond; Alfred Duru; Henri Chivot (1882). Gillette de Narbonne vocal score. Paris: Choudens. OCLC 66645965.
- Noël, Edouard; Edmond Stoullig (1883). Les annales du théâtre et de la musique: 1882 (in French). Paris: G. Charpentier. OCLC 762342119.
- Noël, Edouard; Edmond Stoullig (1884). Les annales du théâtre et de la musique: 1883 (in French). Paris: G. Charpentier. OCLC 762324893.
