= Selina Dolaro =

British singer, actress-manager

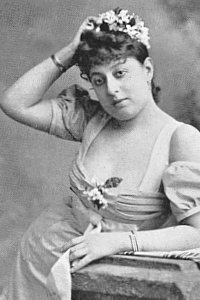
Portrait of Selina Dolaro

Selina Simmons Belasco Dolaro (20 August 1849 – 23 January 1889) was an English singer, actress, theatre manager and writer of the late Victorian era. During her career in operetta and other forms of musical theatre, she managed several of her own opera companies and directed the Royalty Theatre in London. She is best remembered as a producer of the original production of Trial by Jury by Gilbert and Sullivan. Dolaro sang the title role in the opera Carmen in the first English language version of that opera with the Carl Rosa Opera Company. She also wrote plays and novels.

== Early life ==
Dolaro was born in London to Jewish parents, Benjamin Simmons, a violinist and conductor, and Julia (née Lewis). She received early music lessons from her father's colleagues, and she attended the Paris Conservatory as a teenager. In 1865, at the age of sixteen, she married Isaac Dolaro Belasco, an Italian Jew of Spanish descent, in Upper Kennington, with whom she had four children, including the actress Genevieve Belasco (1872–1956); they divorced in 1873. By 1870, she had adopted Dolaro as her stage name.

== Career in England ==
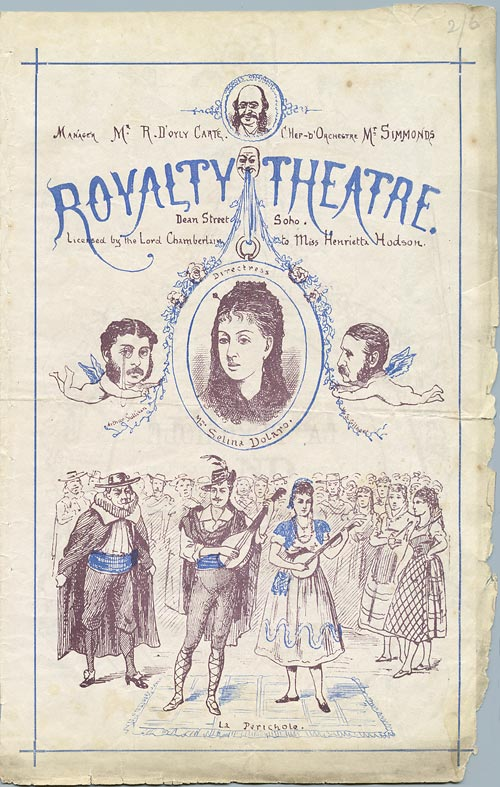
Programme cover of April 1875 for La Périchole and Trial by Jury, with caricatures of Gilbert and Sullivan as cherubs framing a portrait of Dolaro

Dolaro made her stage debut at the Lyceum Theatre, in the role of the Spanish princess, Galsuinda, in Hervé's operetta Chilpéric in 1870 and soon played there in Offenbach operettas. Successes at various London theatres followed: After a season at the Gaiety Theatre, London, Dolaro starred in an English-language Offenbach adaptation called Breaking the Spell, on tour with Fred Sullivan's Operetta Company in 1871. In 1872 Dolaro was a leading performer in H. B. Farnie's English-language adaptation of Offenbach's Geneviève de Brabant, in Hervé's Doctor Faust and in a burlesque of Ferdinand Hérold's Zampa ("Charmingly sung by Miss Dolaro in imitation of Mdlle Chaumont", said The Times) She also appeared in the title role of Bizet's Carmen in the first English-language production, with the Carl Rosa Opera Company, opposite Durward Lely as Don José. In 1873, Dolaro divorced her husband on the grounds of his adultery and desertion; she brought up her two sons and two daughters on her own income.

By January 1875, Dolaro was director of the Royalty Theatre, where her father served as musical director. She starred as the title character in Offenbach's La Périchole, uniting "vivacity as an actress" with "taste and skill as a singer". As a replacement afterpiece to La Périchole, her new theatre manager, Richard D'Oyly Carte, commissioned Trial by Jury from W. S. Gilbert and Arthur Sullivan. Sullivan conducted the opening night performance of Trial on 25 March, but Dolaro's father generally conducted the orchestra thereafter until the end of its initial run on 12 June 1875.

Dolaro took her Madame Selina Dolaro's Comic Opera Co. on tour between 13 June and 10 October 1875, as the theatre was closed during the hot summer months. On their return, Charles Morton became manager of the theatre. Dolaro returned to the position in January 1876 when, again working with Carte, she played Malvina in The Duke's Daughter. Dolaro continued to perform both in London and on tour, appearing at the Alhambra Theatre in 1877. In 1879 she worked at the Folly Theatre, which she also managed for the time.

== In the United States ==
Dolaro travelled to the United States that autumn, appearing in October at the Academy of Music in New York City in the title role of Carmen, but reviews were mixed, with one critic commenting that she seemed "much more at home" performing in burlesque and comic opera. She then joined a touring comic opera troupe before returning to London. In 1880 she appeared again at the Globe Theatre as Cerisette in Farnie & Genee's The Naval Cadets. Soon thereafter she moved to New York, where she spent the next few seasons performing in comic opera. There, she worked under Carte's agency while appearing as Girola in Bucalossi's Les Manteaux Noirs and Katrina in Robert Planquette's Rip van Winkle and as the Fairy Queen in Gilbert and Sullivan's Iolanthe, all in 1882 at the Standard Theatre. The same year she played the title role in Olivette at the Bijou Opera House. In 1883, an opinion piece in the New York Herald by a Reverend Philip Germond denounced "play-acting as a godless life". Dolaro responded with a spirited defence of her profession: "Had I not been 'launched' on this 'godless life,' I should probably have been a burden to some parish or perhaps launched on what I regard as indeed a godless life. ... Is it not enough that we must slave as we do to earn the means to educate and train our children so as to enable them to become useful members of society without being assailed even from the pulpit with such outrageous slander?"

Dolaro's last part was Minnie Marden in an adaptation of Victorien Sardou's Agnes in 1886.

== Health decline and death ==
Soon after her performance in Agnes Dolaro's health began to decline as she began to struggle with tuberculosis. Her last appearance was in New York as a supernumerary in a benefit production of Hamlet for Lester Wallack, played at Daly's Theatre in May 1888.

She died of a stroke in New York City in January 1889 at the age of 39 and was buried in the Beth Olam Cemetery in New York City.

== Publications ==
Dolaro's play, In the Fashion (later known only as Fashion), ran in New York between 1887 and 1888. Her Mes amours: Poems, Passionate and Playful, based on love letters that she had received, was published in 1888. She also wrote a play called Justine.

Dolaro also wrote novels, including:

- The Princess Daphne, Belford, Clarke & Co. (US), 1888 (Edward Heron-Allen with Selina Dolaro – a tale of psychic vampirism, involving mesmerism, doppelgangers and metapsychosis)
- Bella Demonia, Belford, Clarke & Co. (US), [c.1889] (ghost written for Dolaro by Heron-Allen – an historical novel concerning the Russo-Turkish War of 1877–78), published shortly after her death by Lippincott's Magazine
- The Vengeance of Maurice Denalguez, Belford, Clarke & Co. (US), [c.1889] (ghost written for Dolaro by Heron-Allen)
