= Fleur-de-Thé =

1868 operetta by Charles Lecocq

Poster for original production, 1868

Fleur-de-Thé (French pronunciation: [flœʁ də te], Teaflower) is a three-act opéra bouffe with music by Charles Lecocq and words by Alfred Duru and Henri Chivot. The story centres on a French bar-keeper, who is saved from a bigamous marriage to an aristocratic young local by the intervention of his real wife, with the aid of champagne and French sailors. It is set in China to appeal to the 1860s French fashion for Chinoiserie.

The opera was first produced at the Théâtre de l'Athénée, Paris, on 11 April 1868. It was Lecocq's first substantial success and ran for an entire season. It was revived several times in its first three years.

== Background and first performances ==
Lecocq enjoyed an early success in 1856, when he and Georges Bizet shared the first prize in a competition for composers of comic opera, organised by Jacques Offenbach. Lacking the connections to secure commissions from Parisian theatres, Lecocq spent the next decade in obscurity and routine work as a teacher, accompanist and répétiteur. His luck changed in 1867 when William Busnach, manager of the Théâtre de l'Athénée engaged him. His first two-act work, L'amour et son carquois, presented in January 1868, was a modest success, and Busnach commissioned a three-act piece, teaming Lecocq with the established duo of librettists, Alfred Duru and Henri Chivot. Lecocq and his collaborators set the piece in China to appeal to the current French fashion for orientalism.

The work nearly failed to open: the chorus walked out after the dress rehearsal because they had not been paid, but Busnach managed to find the necessary money. Once the first night was under way, on 11 April 1868, the performers, as well as the audience, were enthusiastic about the piece. Désiré, who played the Mandarin, declared at the final curtain that this had been the Athénée's best production yet.

== Original cast ==
Désiré, who played Tien-Tien

- Eustache Pinsonnet Cantinier (proprietor of a bar) – M Sytter
- Tien-Tien Mandarin, Chief of Police – M Désiré
- Ka-o-Lin Captain of the "Tigers" warriors – M Léonce
- Césarine Pinsonnet's wife – Mlle Irma Marié
- Fleur-de-Thé Tien-Tien's daughter – Mlle Lucie Cabel
- Corbillon Ship's helmsman – M Fontenelle

== Synopsis ==
=== Act 1 ===
A French bar on the banks of a Chinese river
The mandarin Tien-Tien, the Chief of Police, is about to visit the French man-of-war La Pintade, in the city's harbour. His daughter, Fleur-de-Thé, has begged permission to accompany him, but this being contrary to Chinese custom, he has refused to take her. She has determined to go by herself and has sent for a palanquin. The bearers, frightened by some unusual noise, abandon her, leaving her alone in the street. She takes refuge in the nearest building, which is a cantine française – a bar for sailors and locals – run by Pinsonnet and his wife Césarine. Pinsonnet, rather taken with her beauty, promises Fleur-de-Thé his protection. Alarmed by the approach of her father, who happens to stray into the place, she conceals herself in the next room. She is discovered there by the jealous Césarine, who immediately hands her over to her father. Tien-Tien, in accordance with local custom, announces that when an unmarried Chinese woman is seen by a stranger, he must marry her, or be executed. Pinsonnet is arrested.

=== Act 2 ===
Tien-Tien's residence
Pinsonnet is given the alternative of marrying or being impaled. He states that he is already married, but that makes no difference to the Chinese, who consider a French marriage no marriage, and he consents, not very reluctantly, to be a Chinese bridegroom. He is accordingly raised to the rank of a mandarin to bring him to suitable status for marriage to Tien-Tien's daughter. This is much resented by her former fiancé, the swaggering soldier Ka-o-Lin. At this point Césarine arrives to deliver some wine ordered by Tien-Tien. She is astonished to find her husband thoroughly at home in the house of Tien-tien, and married to his daughter. She is indignant, but is pleased to find that Fleur-de-Thé hates the situation as much as she does. They agree that Fleur-de-Thé will elope with Ka-o-Lin, and Césarine, concealed by the bridal veil, will impersonate the bride. The elopement fails, as all doors are strictly guarded.

=== Act 3 ===
The Blue Kiosk – a small pavilion
Pinsonnet tries to persuade his wife to remain as an extra or subordinate wife: such things, he says, are common in China, as witness Tien-Tien's twelve wives. Césarine pretends to comply, and, together with Fleur-de-Thé, torments him until he is disillusioned with double matrimony. Tien-Tien discovers the trick played by Césarine, and, in a fury, condemns Pinsonnet to the stake. Césarine uses champagne as a weapon, plying Tien-Tien with Veuve Clicquot, and the Pinsonnets are rescued by sailors from the French ship at the quayside and carried off to safety.

== Numbers ==
=== Act I ===
- Ouverture
- Chœur de Matelots – "A boire! à boire! à boire!"
- Chanson de la Cantinière – "Vivandière, Cantinière"
- Couplets de Pinsonnet – "J'ai couru grossir la foule"
- Duo de Fleur-de-Thé et Pinsonnet – "A l'éviter j'ai réussi" – "Depuis longtemps ayant l'envie"
- Chœur de Chinois – "Vive le grand Tien-Tien!"
- Chinoiserie, chantée par Tien-Tien – "Je suis clairvoyant connue un sphinx "
- Morceau d'ensemble – "Ah! quelle étrange aventure!"
- Final – "Avançons avec prudence"

=== Act II ===
- Entr'acte "
- Trio – "La loi du Tsinn est fort claire"
- Confidence, chantée par Ka-o-Lin – "Je suis né dans le Japon"
- Scène du mariage – "Au son du gong, de la cithare"
- Ariette, chantée par Césarine – "En tous pays l'homme est un être"
- Final – "L'astre aux rayons d'opale"

=== Act III ===
- Entr'acte
- Romance, chantée par Pinsonnet – "Césarine à mes vœux docile"
- Duo de Pinsonnet et Césarine – "Rappelle-toi, ma chère amie"
- Couplets de l'alcôve – "Ensuite, dans la nuit obscure"
- Chœur – "Honneur, honneur, honneur!"
- Ronde du Clicquot et final – "Ce n'est pas un vin de carême"

== Revivals ==
After its initial run, which lasted for the rest of the season, the piece was revived in September 1869, transferring to the larger Théâtre des Variétés. In 1871 a French company took the opera to London, where it played at the Lyceum Theatre to capacity audiences who included several members of the British royal family. The piece was played in New York in the same year. An English translation by J. H. Jarvis was presented at the Criterion Theatre in London in 1875.

== Critical reception ==
The notices for the first production were enthusiastic. Le Ménestrel found the libretto very funny and observed that Lecocq's music showed a composer of true gaiety of temperament. L'indépendance dramatique praised the text, the performers and the score, its sole reservations being that Lecocq had not taken the opportunity to incorporate some genuine Chinese music, and that his finale verged on vulgarity as the rest of the score had not. The reviewer for Paris-programme said that the piece would attract all Paris. "This musical fantasy is indescribable, it must be seen to appreciate it properly. There is nothing wittier, funnier, more coquettish, better imagined, better played, than Fleur-de-Thé." The critic added that Lecocq's score would provoke Hervé (Note: A pirated contemporary American edition of the libretto attributed the music not to the then unknown Lecocq but to Hervé, then the more celebrated and marketable composer of opérette.) and Offenbach to envy. After the piece opened in the US, The New York Times regarded it as "one of the choicest buffo operas of the day ... It is full of melody of a singularly elegant turn; its numbers are orchestrated with infinite taste".

== Notes, references and sources ==
=== Sources ===
- Traubner, Richard (2016). Operetta: A Theatrical History. London: Routledge. ISBN 978-1-138-13892-6.
