= Alfred Duru =

French playwright and operetta librettist (1829–1889)

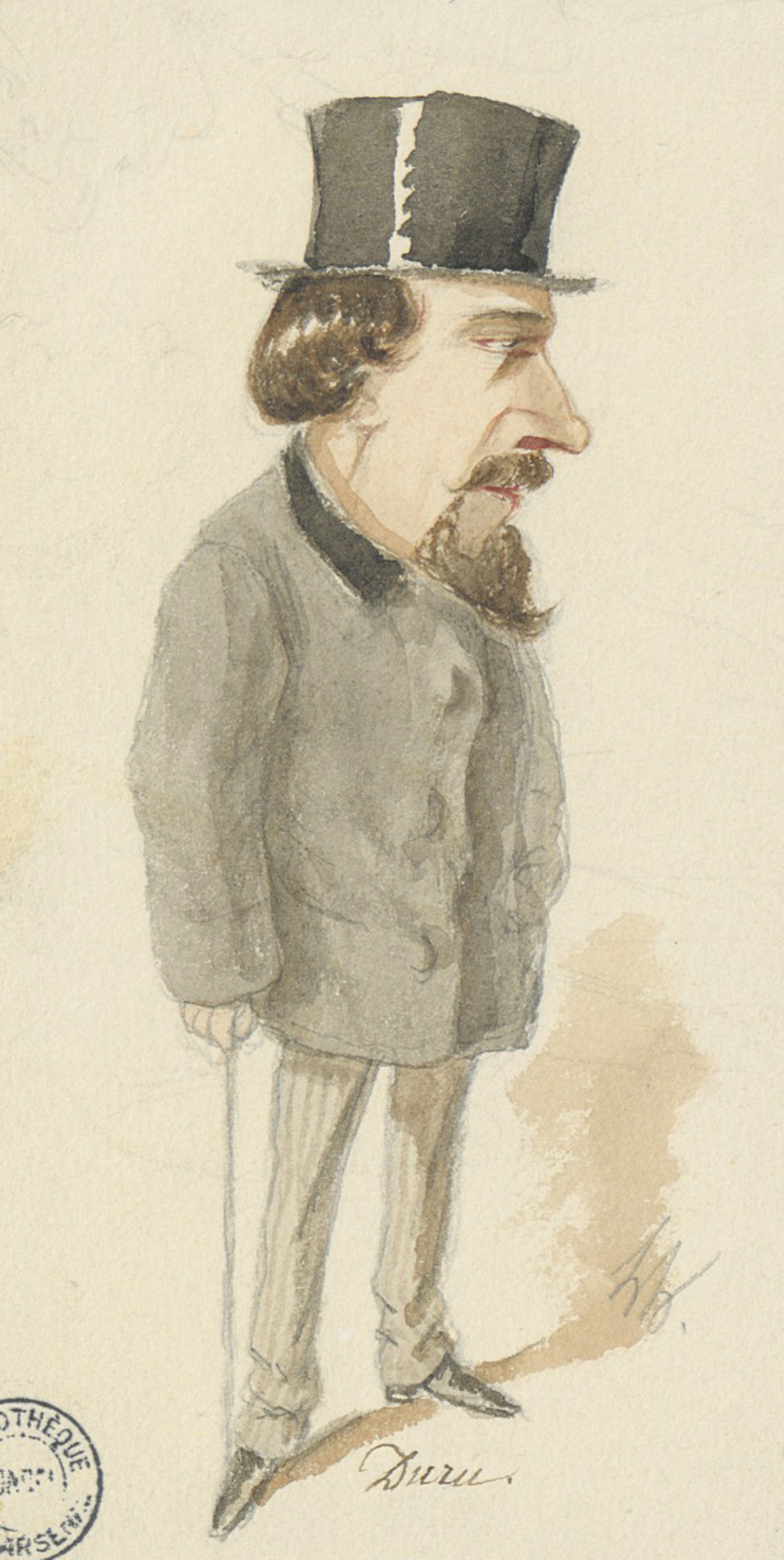
- Alfred Duru by Lhéritier
- Born: 22 November 1829; Clichy
- Died: 28 December 1889 (aged 60); 17th arrondissement of Paris
- Occupations: Playwright; Librettist
- Spouse: Clémence Constance Bernage

Henri Alfred Duru (22 November 1829 – 28 December 1889) was a 19th-century French playwright and operetta librettist who collaborated on more than 40 librettos for the leading French composers of operetta: Hervé, Offenbach, Lecocq and Audran.

== Biography ==
His father was Jacques Denis Duru (Charonne, 1784 – Paris, 18 September 1863) and his mother Avoye Eugénie Leterrier (Villiers-le-Bel, 10 May 1790 – Paris, 26 January 1871), married in Paris on 29 July 1824. As a boy he was a classmate of his principal future literary collaborator, Henri Chivot.

Duru was working as an engraver when in 1857, in collaboration with his friend from the same quartier, Henri Chivot, they wrote “L'Histoire d'un gilet”, a three-act drame-vaudeville. The piece played at the Folies-Dramatiques of the Boulevard du Temple, and on 14 November 1857 inaugurated the new theatre on the Rue de Bondy. From this time onwards, Duru worked continuously in the theatre, usually in collaboration with Chivot.

He produced almost a hundred comédie en vaudevilles, comedies and operetta libretti, which played successfully on the stages of Paris. Chivot and Duru were known for the ingenuity of their subjects, fantasy of the episodes, pure comic situations and gaiety of the dialogues.

In December 1889 he caught the flu, during the 1889–90 flu pandemic and at first seemed to be recovering, but died after a relapse.

He died before he could see his final collaboration with Chivot Le Voyage de Suzette, which opened at the Théâtre de la Gaîté on 20 January 1890. At his interment at Père Lachaise Cemetery on 31 December 1889, a speech was given on his grave by Armand d'Artois on behalf of the Société des auteurs et compositeurs dramatiques.

== Works ==
- 1873: L’Homme du lapin blanc, three-act comédie en vaudeville
- 1870: La Boite à Bibi, folie-vaudeville

In collaboration with Chivot

- 1857: L'Histoire d'un gilet, drame-vaudeville in three acts, (premiere Folies-Dramatiques 14 November 1857)
- 1858: Mon nez, mes yeux, ma bouche, three acts, with Siraudin
- 1850: La Femme de Jephté, three-act vaudeville
- 1860: Les Splendeurs de Fil d’acier, three acts
- 1861: Le Songe d’une nuit d’avril, two acts
- 1863: Pifferaro, one act
- 1864: Les Mères terribles, one-act comedy, given at the Odéon, (first work by Duru and Chivot on a larger stage)
- 1865: La Tante Honorine, three-act comedy (second work by Duru and Chivot in a serious genre, for the same theatre)
- 1865: Les Orphéonistes en voyage, play in five acts and ten tableaux
- 1865: Le Rêve, opéra comique in one act by Edmond Savary, first performed 13 October 1865 Théâtre Lyrique
- 1865: Un homme de bronze, one-act vaudeville
- 1865: Les Médiums de Gonesse, one-act folie
- 1856: Les Chevaliers de ta Table ronde, three-act opéra bouffe, music by Hervé
- 1867: Un Pharmacien aux Thermopyles, one-act vaudeville
- 1868: Le Luxe de ma femme, one-act vaudeville
- 1868: L'île de Tulipatan, one-act opéra bouffe, music by Offenbach
- 1868: Fleur-de-Thé, three-act opéra bouffe, music by Charles Lecocq
- 1868: Le Soldat malgré lui, two-act operetta, music by Frédéric Barbier
- 1869: Le rajah de Mysore, opérette bouffe in one act (21 September 1869 Paris, Bouffes-Parisiens), music by Lecocq
- 1869: Le Carnaval d’un merle blanc, three-act comédie en vaudeville, Théâtre du Palais-Royal
- 1869: Le Docteur Purgandi, opérette bouffe in one act, music by Victor Robillard
- 1872: Les cent vierges, three-act operetta, with Clairville, music by Lecocq
- 1875: La Blanchisseuse de Berg-op-Zoom, three acts, music by Léon Vasseur
- 1870: Le Pompon, three-act opéra comique, music by Lecocq
- 1877: Le grand mogol, opéra bouffe in three acts, music by Audran (revised, in four acts for Paris in 1884)
- 1878: Madame Favart, three acts, music by Offenbach
- 1873: Les Braconniers, opéra bouffe in three acts, music by Offenbach
- 1879: Les noces d'Olivette, three-act opéra comique, music by Edmond Audran
- 1880: La Fille du tambour-major, three-act opéra comique, music by Offenbach
- 1880: Le Siège de Grenade, four-act vaudeville
- 1881: La Mère des compagnons, three-act opéra comique, music by Hervé
- 1881: La Mascotte, three-act opéra comique, music by Audran
- 1881: Les forfaits de Pipermans, one-act vaudeville
- 1882: Bocace, adaptation of German libretto into three-act opéra comique, music by Suppé (as Boccaccio)
- 1882: Gillette de Narbonne, opéra comique in three acts, music by Audran
- 1882: Le Truc d’Arthur, three-act comedy
- 1883: La Picarde, three-act opéra comique, music by Audran
- 1883: La Princesse de Canarie, three-act opéra comique, music by Lecocq
- 1883: L’Oiseau bleu, three-act opéra comique, music by Lecocq
- 1883: La Dormeuse éveillée, three-act opéra comique, music by Audran
- 1885: Pervenche, three-act opérette, music by Audran
- 1885: Les Noces d’un réserviste, four-act vaudeville
- 1886: La cigale et la fourmi, opéra comique in ten tableaux, music by Audran
- 1887: Surcouf, three-act opéra comique with a prologue, music by Robert Planquette
- 1890: Le Voyage de Suzette, opérette in three acts music by Vasseur (first performed 20 January 1890, Théâtre de la Gaîté)

In collaboration with Labiche

- 1875: Doit-on le dire?, three-act comedy
- 1874: Madame est trop belle, three-act comedy.
- 1875: Les Samedis de Madame, three-act comedy.
