= La mascotte =

Opéra comique by Edmond Audran

Poster for first production, 1880

La mascotte (The Mascot) is a three-act opéra comique with music by Edmond Audran and words by Alfred Duru and Henri Chivot. The story concerns a farm girl who is a "mascotte": someone with the mystic power to bring good luck to all around her, so long as she remains a virgin.

The opera opened at the Théâtre des Bouffes Parisiens, Paris, on 28 December 1880, and had an initial run of 301 performances. Productions followed in other continental European countries, the Americas, Britain and Australia. The title of the piece introduced the word "mascotte" into standard French usage, "mascot" into English, and other variants of it into several more languages.

== Background and first production ==
In 1880 "mascotte" was a fairly new French slang word derived from the Provençal term mascoto, meaning "spell" or "bewitchment". At the time it was as unknown to standard French dictionaries as to English. (Note: The first recorded use of the word was in 1867. A journalist reported after the premiere of the opera that he had looked in vain for "mascotte" in the Dictionnaire de l'Académie française and four other authoritative dictionaries. The current (9th) edition of the Académie's dictionary defines the word as "Personne, animal ou objet qui est regardé comme fétiche, comme porte-bonheur" – "Person, animal or object that is regarded as a fetish, as a lucky charm". The word was absorbed into English as "mascot" (1881) and into other languages: German "Maskottchen", Spanish "mascota", Dutch "mascotte", Czech "mascota" and Greek "μασκότ (maskót)") According to Audran's son, the inspiration for La mascotte came from a trinket given to Audran's wife, who was from Provençe, by her seafaring brother; it was a good-luck charm that nobody but Madame Audran was allowed to touch: "Edmond, ne touche pas à ma mascotte". Audran conceived the idea that a person might also be a mascotte, and suggested this as a theme to his collaborators, the librettists Alfred Duru and Henri Chivot.

La mascotte came near the beginning of Audran's career as a composer of works for the Parisian stage. His first big success, Les noces d'Olivette, opened at the Théâtre des Bouffes Parisiens in 1879, and La mascotte was written for the same house. It opened on 28 December 1880 and ran for 472 performances, taking well over a million francs at the box office. (Note: The total was 1,372,522 francs, which according to the Historicalstatistics.org converter is equal to about €6,006,137 in 2015 terms.) The success of La mascotte was so great that the intendant of the Bouffes-Parisiens and Audran entered into a five-year contract under which Audran would compose for no other Paris theatre.

At the premiere of the piece four principals were making their Paris debuts, all of them successfully. The two women were Marie Montbazon (later known as Marie Grisier-Montbazon), who played Bettina, and Mdlle Dinelli (Fiametta). The former was from a theatrical family well known in the French provinces, making her Paris debut at the age of 21; she went on to a successful career, starring in new works by Audran and others during the 1880s and 1890s. Dinelli as Fiametta was equally well received, but had a short career, curtailed by mental illness in 1883. The two male débutants were the tenors: the lyric Lamy and the comic Raucourt, both praised by the Revue musicale.

== Roles ==
Role	Voice type	Original cast
Laurent XVII, Prince of Piombino	baritone	Paul Hittemans
Fiametta, his daughter	soprano	Dinelli
Prince Fritellini of Pisa, Fiametta's fiancé	tenor	Charles Lamy
Rocco, a farmer	tenor	Raucourt
Pippo, a shepherd	baritone	Louis Morlet
Bettina, the mascot	mezzo-soprano	Marie Montbazon
Parafante, sergeant	baritone	Pescheux
Mathéo, inn-keeper	bass	Desmonts
Peasants, lords and ladies of court, soldiers, etc.

Source: Vocal score.

== Synopsis ==
The action is set in the principality of Piombino, Tuscany in the 16th century.

Act I

Marie Montbazon as Bettina, 1880

Louis Morlet and Marie Montbazon as Pippo and Bettina

Rocco, a farmer, is the persistent victim of misfortune. However hard he works, things keep going wrong for him. He compares himself ruefully to his brother Antonio, who farms with great success just down the road. To his dismay, Antonio sends him a new worker, Bettina, a keeper of turkeys, and girlfriend of his shepherd, Pippo: Rocco feels he is not in need of more workers but of better luck.

Bettina brings with her a letter from Antonio, which Rocco neglects to read. Had he read it he would know that Bettina is a mascotte, who mysteriously brings good fortune to her employer and everyone else with whom she is connected. Such beings were created by the benevolent God to counter the evil that stalks the world. As long as they remain pure and chaste their power continues; only a virgin can be a mascotte. As soon as Bettina arrives Rocco's luck starts to improve. The ruler of the principality, Laurent XVII, is out hunting with his daughter, Fiametta, and her fiancé, Prince Fritellini of Pisa, and honours Rocco's farm with a visit. Laurent is as jinxed as Rocco. He loses wars, makes disastrous investments, has no luck when hunting, and has a rebellious daughter who baulks at an arranged marriage with Fritellini. Laurent's bad fortune continues: he tumbles into a barrel of wine. Rocco provides him with a change of clothes, in which Laurent finds Antonio's unread letter. Reading it he discovers the truth about Bettina's mystic power and decrees that she must accompany him to his court. He fabricates a story that she has been discovered to be a long-lost aristocrat.

Act II

Since Bettina has been resident at the castle, prosperity has returned to the Prince's affairs. He is so solicitous about her comfort that the court believes she is his mistress, although in fact he is determined that she shall not be anyone's mistress, as her continued beneficent influence as mascotte depends on her continuing virginity. Pippo, disguised as one of a troupe of entertainers, gets into the castle and finds his beloved. Recognised, he is arrested and thrown into a dungeon, where Fiametta visits him. She noticed him on the farm and found him highly attractive. They are discovered tête-à-tête, but Laurent, far from being angry, finds it convenient to marry his daughter off to Pippo, as this will remove any danger that Bettina and Pippo might marry. Bettina, angry at what she sees as Pippo's desertion, says she will marry Laurent. Fritellini, furious, leaves the palace, threatening retaliation. His father is ruler of the powerful neighbouring state of Pisa, and there will be war. Pippo and Bettina, realising that they are being manipulated, escape through a window.

Act III

Without his mascotte, Laurent's luck has become dreadful again. He is defeated in battle by Fritellini's forces. Pippo and Bettina have joined the latter's ranks. Laurent and Fiametta flee the castle, disguised as vagabonds. They arrive at Fritellini's camp just as the marriage of Captain Pippo and Bettina is taking place. The Prince is delighted, as this will end the good luck the mascotte has brought to Fritellini and those around him. Rocco, to avenge himself on the fallen autocrat, explains to Pippo about the mascotte and the consequences if he consummates his marriage: he will lose his high status in Fritellini's company and become a simple shepherd again. Pippo hesitates, but love wins. The fugitive Prince and his daughter are recognised and arrested. Fiametta is so beautiful in her rags and Fritellini looks so dashing in his beautiful uniform that the two are reconciled and the war can be ended. Happiness becomes general when it emerges that being a mascotte is hereditary, and Bettina emerges from the bridal chamber blushing and promising to have twins.

Source: Gänzl's Book of the Musical Theatre.

== Numbers ==
1881 vocal score

- Acte I
  - Overture
  - Chorus – "La vendange se termine" – Harvesting is over
  - Couplets of sweet wine (3 peasants) – "Il fait fuir l'humeur morose" – It banishes gloom
  - Ballade (Pippo, chorus) – "Un jour le diable" – One day the devil
  - Chorus of village boys – "Allons la belle" – Come, pretty one
  - Couplets (Bettina) – "N'avancez pas ou je tape" – Don't approach me or I'll hit you
  - Chorus – "On aime à voir après la chasse" – After the hunt one loves to see
  - Couplets of omens (Laurent) – "Les gens sensés et sages" – Wise and sagacious people
  - Couplets (Fiametta) – "Ah! qu'il est beau" – Ah, how fine it is
  - Couplets of "je ne sais quoi" (Fritellini, Fiametta) – "D'un athlète ou d'un villageois" – An athlete or a villager
  - Duet (Bettina, Pippo) – "Je sens lorsque je t'aperçois" – I feel when I see you
  - Finale (all) – "On sonne, on sonne" – They ring the bells
- Act II
  - Entr'acte
  - Chorus – "Qu'elle est belle" – She is beautiful,
  - Couplets (pages) – "Excusez mon audace extrême" – Excuse my extreme boldness
  - Duet (Bettina, Laurent) – "Ah laissez-moi!" – Oh leave me!
  - Couplets (Bettina) – "Que je regrette mon village" – How I miss my village
  - Chorus – "Ah! quel spectacle charmant" – Ah, what a charming sight
  - Air (Pippo) – "Salut à vous seigneur!" – Hail, Prince
  - Duet (Pippo, Bettina) – "Sais-tu que ces beaux habits-là" – Do you know these beautiful clothes
  - Couplets (Fritellini) – "Des courtisans qui passeront" – Courtiers, as they pass
  - Couplets (Laurent) – "Chasser le cerf au son du cor" – Hunting the deer to the sound of the horn
  - Finale (all) – "C'est le futur de la princesse" – He is the princess's intended
- Acte III
  - Entr'acte
  - Chorus of soldiers – "Verse, verse à boire" – Pour, pour the drinks
  - Entrance of the Prince (Fritellini) – "Très bien? bonjour, soldat" et – Very good, hello, soldier
  - Couplets of the tambour (Fritellini) – "De nos pas marquant la cadence" – Marking time for our steps
  - Entrance of the strolling minstrels (chorus) – "Ne tremblez pas braves gens" – Do not tremble, good people
  - Song of the orang-outan (Fiametta) – "Le grand singe d'Amérique" – The great ape of America
  - Entrance of the wedding party (Pippo, chorus) – "Je touche au but" – I am nearing the goal
  - Quartet (Bettina, Pipo, Laurent, Rocco) – "Quoi Pippo! quand je vous réclame" – What Pippo! When I call you
  - Finale (all) – "Pourquoi donc crier ainsi" – Why shout so.

Source: Vocal score.

== Revivals and adaptations ==
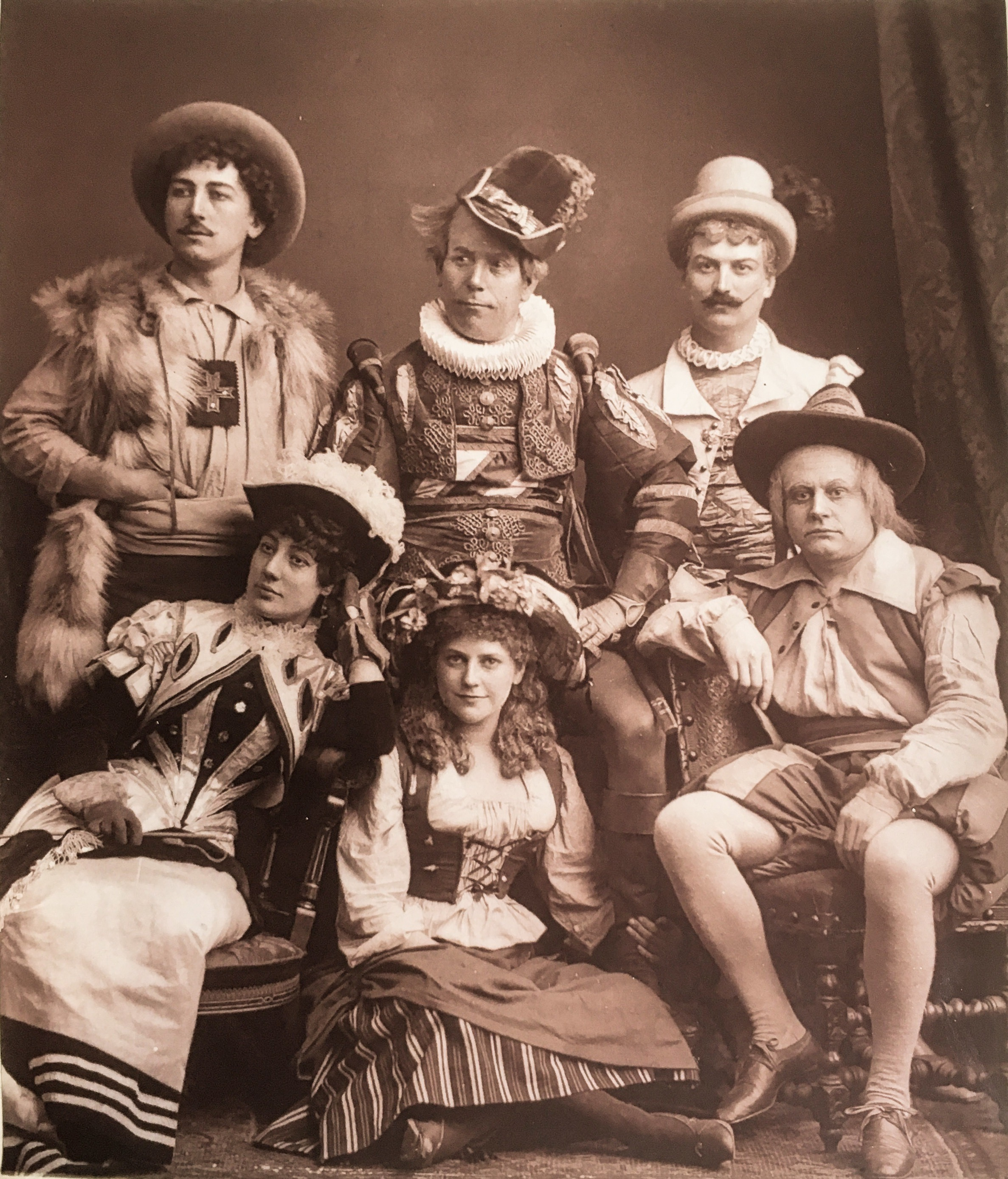
The principal cast of La Mascotte at the Comedy Theatre in London, 1881

There were twelve revivals of the piece in Paris between 1883 and 1944.

The work was presented in Vienna at the Theater an der Wien on 12 February 1881 and revived in 1893. Brussels first saw the piece the next month. The first production in New York was at the Bijou Opera House on 5 May 1881, starring Emma Howson. Ten New York revivals between then and 1887 (including one in German) are detailed in Gänzl's Book of the Musical Theatre, which notes that there were regular productions in subsequent years, including 1892, 1909 and 1926.

The first London production was at the Comedy Theatre, on 15 October 1881 in an adaptation by Robert Reece and H. B. Farnie, starring Violet Cameron, Henry Bracy, Lionel Brough and Minnie Byron. The piece was revived in the West End in 1882, 1884, 1888 and 1893. It was staged in Berlin at the Friedrich-Wilhelmstadtisches Theater on 25 October 1881. An Australian production was presented at the Theatre Royal, Sydney on 25 October 1882. There were productions in Italy (1882) and Brazil (1888). The town of Piombino in Tuscany, where the opera is supposedly set, staged a production in 2012.

A film version of The Mascot was directed by Léon Mathot in 1935 starring Germaine Roger, Lucien Baroux and Dranem.

== Critical reception ==
The Annales du théâtre et de la musique commented that the piece starts off as opéra comique but in the second act crosses the boundary into opérette, "but none the worse for that". (Note: "Jetée dans le moule de l'opéra-comique, cette donnée fantaisiste ne tarde pas à trouver ce cadre trop étroit, et dès le second acte nous la retrouvons franchissant bravement la limite qui la sépare de l'opérette. La pièce n'en est pas plus mal venue pour cela.") The writer observed that he had judged the score by higher standards than applied to most light operatic shows, which was a compliment to Audran; of the twenty-plus numbers in his score, there were five or six where the composer's personal imagination and musicianship were, the reviewer considered, displayed with complete originality. Reviewing the Paris production, The Morning Post found the work "a decided advance" on Audran's earlier work, the music "tasteful and pleasing throughout, with a gay amusing story, wittily told." According to the Encyclopædia Britannica Eleventh Edition, "Many of [Audran's] operas, La mascotte in particular, reveal a degree of musicianship which is rarely associated with the ephemeral productions of the lighter stage."

== Recordings ==
The Académie Nationale de l'Opérette lists two complete recordings of the opera, one conducted by Ronald Benedetti, with Geneviève Moizan, Denise Cauchard, Robert Massard and Lucien Baroux, and the other conducted by Marcel Cariven, with Freda Betti, Huguette Hennetier, Willy Clément, Gaston Rey, Raymond Amade and Robert Destain. The Académie Nationale site lists two complete video recordings, the first from 1957, the second from 1961, both conducted by Georges Derveaux.

== Legacy: Mascot ==
La mascotte is credited with bringing the word "mascot" into the English language. The Oxford Dictionary of Word Origins states, "The French operetta La Mascotte by Edmond Audran had its première on 29 December 1880. The next year the word made its first appearance in English. French mascotte derives from masco (witch) in the dialect of southern France. At first mascot meant simply "a person or thing supposed to bring good luck" and did not have to be carried or displayed, as now."

== Notes, references and sources ==
=== Sources ===
- Audran, Edmond; Alfred Duru; Henri Chivot (1900). La mascotte, vocal score. Paris: Choudens. OCLC 68760602.
- Gänzl, Kurt; Andrew Lamb (1988). Gänzl's Book of the Musical Theatre. London: The Bodley Head. OCLC 966051934.
- Noël, Edouard; Edmond Stoullig (1881). Les annales du théâtre et de la musique: 1880 (in French). Paris: G. Charpentier. OCLC 762330267.
- Noël, Edouard; Edmond Stoullig (1882). Les annales du théâtre et de la musique: 1881 (in French). Paris: G. Charpentier. OCLC 762324252.
