= Les noces d'Olivette =

Opéra comique by Edmond Audran

Les noces d'Olivette is an opéra comique in three acts composed by Edmond Audran, with a libretto by Alfred Duru and Henri Charles Chivot. The farcical romance story concerns Olivette, who loves Valentine (who is also loved by a Countess) but is engaged to a sea captain, who she refuses to marry. Valentine secretly weds Olivette, the captain declares that Olivette is his rightful bride, Valentine is arrested, Olivette is disowned, but eventually her marriage to Valentine is upheld.

It premiered in Paris in 1879. English-language adaptations were mounted in 1880 in both London, where it played for 466 performances, and New York. Revivals followed.

== Premiere ==
The work premiered under the direction of Louis Cantin in Paris on 13 November 1879 at the Théâtre des Bouffes-Parisiens. Alfred Jolly sang the role of the Duc des Ifs, with Élise Clary as Olivette and Giulia Bennati as the Countess.

== English adaptation ==
The opera played for 466 performances, entitled Olivette, at the Strand Theatre in London from 1880 to 1881 in an English-language adaptation by H. B. Farnie, starring Florence St. John. Olivette opened at the Bijou Opera House in New York City on 25 December 1880. It was revived there the next Christmas and in 1882; a squib in The New York Times noted that it "has been drawing good-sized audiences [and] seems to retain its hold upon the public favor. The cast at the Bijou includes Mme. Dolaro as Olivette". it also played at the American Theatre in New York City in March 1899.

== Roles and role creators ==
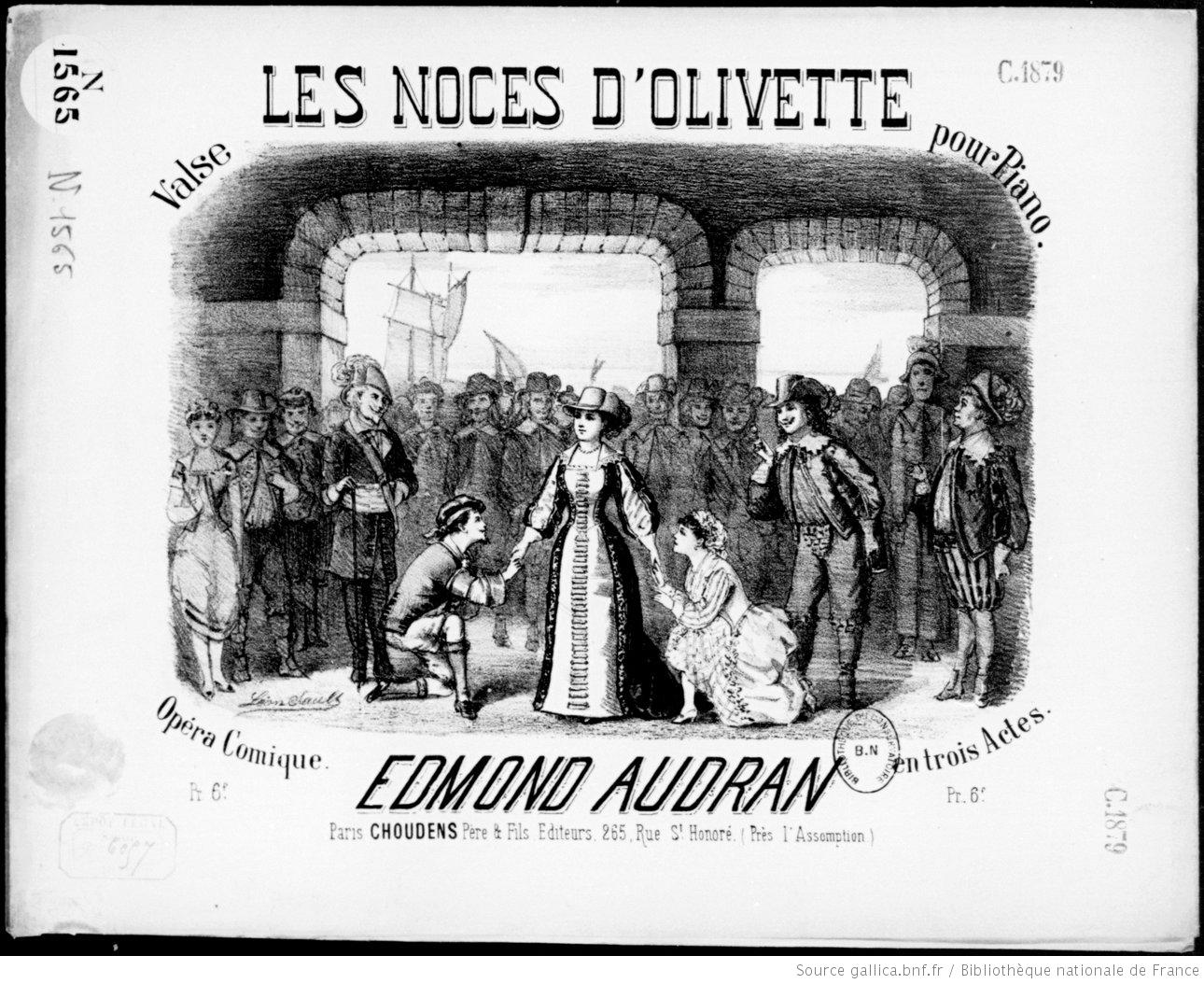
1879 illustration

Roles, voice types, premiere cast
Role	Voice type	Premiere cast, 13 November 1879
Captain De Merimac, of the Corvette "Cormorant"	tenor	Gerpré
Valentin, officer in the Roussillon Guards, his nephew	tenor	Marcelin
Duc des Ifs, cousin and heir presumptive to the Countess of Roussillon	tenor	Alfred Jolly
Marvejol, Seneschal to the Countess of Roussillon and Maire of Perpignan	baritone	Desmonts
Lonfuseau	tenor	Pescheux
Lartimon		Bartelot
Un aubergiste		Lespinasse
Olivette, daughter of the Seneschal	soprano	Élise Clary
Bathilde, Countess of Roussillon	soprano	Giulia Bennati
Ourika		Rivero
Mistigris		Becker
Moustique, De Merimac's cabin boy	soprano	Gabrielle
Marinette		Barnolle
Toinon		Mauriane
Lajinjole		Lynnès
Fanchette		Gerardi
Margotte		Castelli
Pavillon		Forty
Simone		Jeanne
Madelinette		Linville
Laviron		Noblet
Maids of Honor, midshipmen on board the "Cormorant", sailors, and maids at the "Mainbrace Tavern".

== Synopsis ==
Act 1

In the town of Perpignan, Olivette is engaged to a sea captain, De Merimac. Olivette has just returned from the convent where she fell in love with Valentine, nephew of De Merimac. When the captain arrives, Olivette, who is described as an "angel of sweetness and obedience", tells him to leave, as she will not marry him. The captain is not worried, for he is sure he has it in his power to force her to marry him. The countess of Roussillon has promised him anything he wants because the captain had previously rescued her chimpanzee from a watery grave. He writes to her asking her to order the marriage. The captain is unexpectedly called off on a three month voyage and is unable to go through with the nuptials. The countess, who is also in love with Valentine, has come to Perpignan to be near him. She requests the marriage according to the captain's instructions and Valentine, pretending to be the elder De Merimac, quietly weds Olivette himself.

Act 2

The countess gives a ball in honor of the wedding. Valentine is having a difficult time impersonating both his uncle and himself by frequent changes of clothing. The captain returns from his voyage and is recognized as the bridegroom. Valentine, coming in suddenly and dressed as the old man, is confronted by the captain and forced to explain. The captain declares that Olivette is his rightful bride.

Act 3

Olivette plans to get rid of the captain with a conspiracy. The countess thwarts the plan by declaring her intention to marry Valentine. The Countess is imprisoned on De Merimac's ship, "The Cormorant". When Olivette and Valentine, disguised as sailors, are making their getaway, Valentine is seized. Olivette manages to set the countess free and puts on the countess's clothes, passing her own on to the countess's maid Veloutine. The fickle Duke courts Olivette, thinking that she is the Countess. The Duke boasts of his success so loudly that both the captain and Valentine disown Olivette until she is able to prove an alibi. Eventually, things are straightened out, the marriage of Valentine and Olivette is upheld, the countess finally acknowledges the Duke's advances, and the captain is left to console himself.
