= Edmond Audran =

French composer

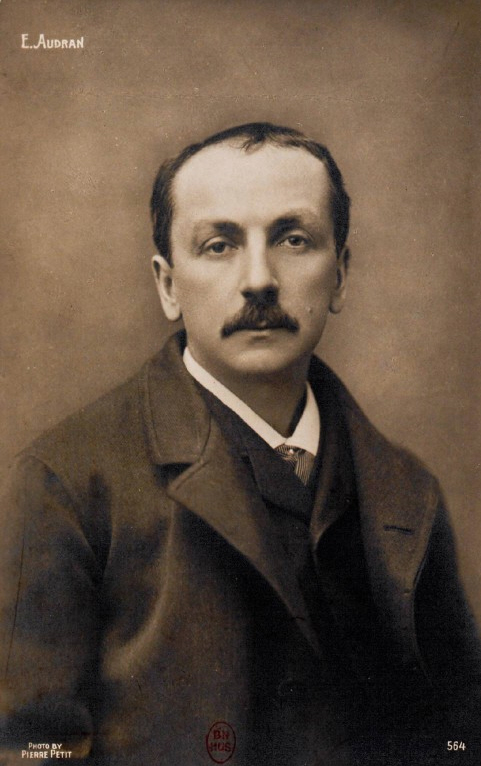
Photo of Audran by Pierre Petit, Bibliothèque nationale de France

Achille Edmond Audran (12 April 1840 – 17 August 1901) was a French composer best known for several internationally successful comic operas and operettas.

After beginning his career in Marseille as an organist, Audran composed religious music and began to write works for the stage in the 1860s and 1870s. Among these, Le grand mogol (1877) was the most popular and was later revived in Paris, London and New York. In 1879 he moved to Paris, where some of his pieces achieved considerable success both in France and abroad, including Les noces d'Olivette (1879), La mascotte (1880), Gillette de Narbonne (1882), La cigale et la fourmi (1886), Miss Helyett (1890) and La poupée (1896).

Most of his works are now neglected, but La mascotte has been revived occasionally and has been recorded for the gramophone.

== Early life and career ==
Audran was born in Lyon, the son of Marius-Pierre Audran (1816–87), who had a career as a tenor at the Opéra-Comique. He studied music at the École Niedermeyer under Jules Duprato, where he won the prize for composition in 1859. In 1861 his family moved to Marseille, where his father accepted the post of singing teacher, later becoming director of the conservatory.

Poster for the 1884 production of Le grand mogol in Paris.

Audran became organist of the church of St Joseph there, for which he wrote religious music including, in 1873, a mass that was also performed in Paris at St Eustache. He made his first appearance as a dramatic composer at Marseilles with L'Ours et le Pacha (1862), a musical version of one of Eugène Scribe's vaudevilles. This was followed by La Chercheuse d'Esprit (1864), a comic opera, also produced at Marseille. Audran's compositions included a funeral march on the death of Giacomo Meyerbeer, which was performed with some success; some songs in the Provençal dialect, including La cour d'amour (Marseilles, 1881), and various sacred pieces. He produced a Mass (Marseille, 1873), an oratorio, La sulamite (Marseille, 1876), Adoro te, a motet (Paris, 1882) and numerous minor works, but he is known almost entirely as a composer of light opera.

== Operetta successes ==
While still in Marseilles, Audran wrote a half dozen operettas, the most successful of which was Le grand mogol (1877), with a libretto by Henri Chivot. Together with the playwright Alfred Duru, Audran and Chivot revised the piece for a Paris production in 1884. He moved to Paris in 1879, "where at first he occupied a humble lodging in a garret", but he was soon prosperous, with the success of Les noces d'Olivette (1879), which had "an enormous vogue". The work speedily found its way to London (as Olivette), in an English translation by H. B. Farnie, and ran for more than a year at the Strand Theatre (1880–81). The critic of The Pall Mall Gazette, predicting "a brilliant and enduring success", wrote, "Bizet in his Carmen has scarcely been more successful in catching the atmosphere of Andalusia than has M. Audran in assigning to Les Noces d'Olivette that of Provence."

After Audran moved to Paris, most of his stage works were premiered there before being presented abroad, but four of his works were premiered elsewhere: La paradis de Mahomet (Brussels, 1887), Photis (Geneva, 1896), Indiana (Manchester, 1886) and La reine des reines ( Strasbourg, 1896). In Paris, the success of La mascotte (1880) was so great that the intendant of the Bouffes-Parisiens and Audran entered into a five-year contract under which Audran would compose for no other Paris theatre. He worked with a large number of librettists, but his most frequent collaborators were Maxime Boucheron, Chivot, Duru and Maurice Ordonneau. Of one of his collaborations, a critic wrote, "I might dispose of the new three-act comic opera brought out at the Bouffes-Parisiens by simply stating that its title is Pervenche, that its libretto is by MM. Chivot and Duru, its score by M. Edmond Audran, and that both authors and composer have adhered so closely to their well-known style as to necessitate no further call on your space."

Audran's music met with as much favour in England as in France, and all but a few of his works were given in English adaptations in London theatres. The most successful of Audran's many comic operas were: Le grand mogol (Marseille, 1877; Paris, 1884; London, as The Grand Mogul, 1884 with a libretto by Farnie, starring Florence St. John, Fred Leslie and Arthur Roberts; New York as The Snake Charmer, 1881); La mascotte (Paris, 1880; New York, 1881; London, as The Mascotte, 1881 with a libretto by Farnie, and cast including Lionel Brough and Henry Bracy); Gillette de Narbonne (Paris, 1882; London, as Gillette, 1883, libretto by H. Savile Clarke, with additional music by Walter Slaughter and Hamilton Clarke); La cigale et la fourmi (the grasshopper and the ant) (Paris, 1886; London, as La Cigale, 1890; English version by F. C. Burnand, starring Geraldine Ulmar, Eric Lewis and Brough); Miss Helyett (Paris, 1890; London, as Miss Decima, 1891, libretto by Burnand); and La poupée (Paris, 1896; London, 1897, libretto by Arthur Sturgess, starring Courtice Pounds and Willie Edouin).

== Later years and death ==
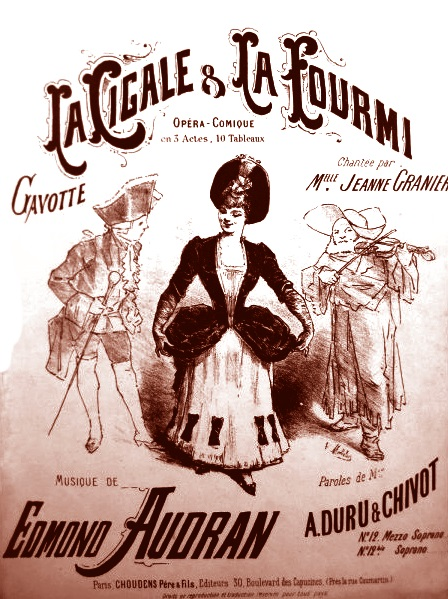
Sheet music for the gavotte from La cigale et la fourmi

During his last few years, Audran suffered mental and physical illness and was forced to withdraw from Parisian society. He died in Tierceville on the north coast of France at the age of 61.

== Critical assessment ==
According to the Encyclopædia Britannica Eleventh Edition, Audran was one of the best of the successors of Jacques Offenbach:

He had little of Offenbach's humour, but his music is distinguished by an elegance and a refinement of manner which lift it above the level of opera bouffe to the confines of genuine opera comique. He was a fertile if not a very original melodist, and his orchestration is full of variety, without being obtrusive or vulgar. Many of his operas, La mascotte in particular, reveal a degree of musicianship which is rarely associated with the ephemeral productions of the lighter stage.

In 1957, the critic Philip Hope-Wallace wrote, "Those who attend on seaside bandstands will know the name of Edmond Audran … for his overtures to La Mascotte, La Poupie [sic] and Miss Helyett still set the old squares' feet a-tapping. If he never quite shook out of his sleeve any little inspiration which could rival Offenbach he made a very good second best talent go a long way. He himself did not greatly care for La Mascotte ... thinking his other works more subtle." Few of Audran's works have been recorded, but a French set of La mascotte was issued in 1957. La mascotte is credited with bringing the word "mascot" into the English language. The Oxford Dictionary of Word Origins states, "The French operetta La Mascotte by Edmond Audran had its première on 29 December 1880. The next year the word made its first appearance in English. French mascotte derives from masco 'witch' in the dialect of southern France. At first mascot meant simply 'a person or thing supposed to bring good luck' and did not have to be carried or displayed, as now."
