= Henri Chivot =

French writer and playwright

- Chivot, 1890s
- Born: 13 November 1830; Paris
- Died: 18 September 1897 (aged 66); Le Vésinet
- Occupations: Writer, librettist

Henri Charles Chivot (French pronunciation: [ɑ̃ʁi ʃaʁl ʃivo]; 13 November 1830 – 18 September 1897) was a French writer and playwright, mostly known as an operetta librettist.

== Biography ==
Henri Chivot was born in Paris on 13 November 1830. He worked, successively, as a clerk, a lawyer, an employee of the Paris-Lyon-Mediterranean railway, and later the head of that company's Paris office. He wrote his first play in collaboration with Marc-Michel – Une Trilogie de pantalons (A Trilogy of Trousers), a comic one-act vaudeville, which was performed at the Théâtre du Palais-Royal in 1855. His next production, Sous un hangar (Under a Shed, 1857), a one-act vaudeville like its predecessor, was his first solo play. He continued to write comedies and dramas, mainly in collaboration with his friend Alfred Duru. His plays were presented at the Théâtre des Variétés, the Palais-Royal, the Théâtre des Folies-Dramatiques and other houses.

From 1865 Chivot became a librettist and in collaboration, particularly with Duru, he wrote more than forty librettos for operettas or opéras comiques for composers famous in the second half of the 19th century. Of these, according to Grove's Dictionary of Music and Musicians, the ones that have held their place in the French repertory most successfully are Offenbach's La fille du tambour-major, Audran's Le grand mogol and La mascotte and Lecocq's Les cent vierges. Other composers for whom Chivot and Duru wrote were Hervé, Franz von Suppé and Robert Planquette. He said that he modelled his writing on that of Eugène Scribe, Eugène Labiche and Félix-Auguste Duvert, taking note of their careful construction and theatrical craft. After Duru died in 1889, Chivot continued to write for the theatre, and was working on a new piece for the Palais-Royale at the time of his own death.

Chivot had two daughters and one son, the military painter Charles Chivot. He died at his home in Le Vésinet, near Paris on 18 September 1897, aged 66.

== Works ==
- 1866: Zilda ou la Nuit des dupes, written with Vernoy de St-Georges, for Friedrich von Flotow
- In constant collaboration with Alfred Duru for:
- Hervé,
  - 1866: Les Chevaliers de la Table Ronde
- Charles Lecocq
  - 1868: Fleur-de-Thé
  - 1869: Gandolfo
  - 1872: Les cent vierges
- Edmond Audran
  - 1879: Les noces d'Olivette
  - 1880: La Mascotte
  - 1882: Gillette de Narbonne
  - 1884: Le Grand Mogol
- Jacques Offenbach
  - 1868: L'Ile de Tulipatan
  - 1873: Les Braconniers
  - 1878: Madame Favart
  - 1879: La Fille du tambour-major;
- Robert Planquette
  - 1887: Surcouf
