= Andrew Lamb (writer) =

English writer, music historian, lecturer and broadcaster (born 1942)

Andrew Martin Lamb (born 23 September 1942) is an English writer, music historian, lecturer and broadcaster, known for his expertise in light music and musical theatre. In addition to his musical work, Lamb maintained a full-time career as an actuary and investment manager.

== Biography ==
Lamb was born in Oldham, Lancashire, the son of Harry Lamb, a schoolmaster, and his wife Winifred, née Emmott. He was educated at Werneth Council School, Oldham, Manchester Grammar School and Corpus Christi College, Oxford. He graduated in mathematics in 1963, gaining a master's degree in 1967 and a Doctorate of Letters in 2006. In addition to his musical work, he maintained a full-time career as an actuary and investment manager with major financial institutions in the UK, having qualified as a Fellow of the Institute of Actuaries in 1972. He married in 1970 and has two daughters and a son. He has been a member of Lancashire County Cricket Club since 1954.

In 1980, Lamb was a member of the Arts Council of Great Britain Light Opera Enquiry, and in 1988 he was a member of the jury of the Offenbach International Singing Competition in Paris. He was a member of the Advisory Board of The New Grove Dictionary of Opera, and from 1987 to 1996 he assisted Antonio de Almeida on the latter's ultimately unpublished Offenbach thematic catalogue. In 1995 he performed in Dan Crawford's production of Noël Coward's Cavalcade, appearing as the Stage Manager at the Churchill Theatre, Bromley, and the Major Domo at Sadler's Wells Theatre, London. In 2008 he wrote the programme article for the production of Amadeo Vives's La Generala at the Teatro de la Zarzuela in Madrid, and in 2009 he was a speaker at the Ruperto Chapí Centenary Congress in Valencia, Spain. He has also given talks for English National Opera at the Coliseum Theatre, London, and at the Buxton Festival. He is a member of the Honorary Board of the Centro Studi Eric Sams.

Grove's Dictionary of Music and Musicians describes Lamb as "a noted authority on the lighter forms of music theatre" and notes the lucidity of his extensive writings on a wide range of musical topics, including zarzuela, operetta, American and British musical theatre, Arthur Sullivan, the Strauss family, Jacques Offenbach, Jerome Kern and the Waldteufels. In 2012, Lamb instituted a project to honour the composer Edward James Loder that resulted in musical events in Bath in 2015, CD recordings of Loder's piano music and his opera Raymond and Agnes, and a book commemorating the Loder family, edited by Nicholas Temperley, to which Lamb contributed a biographical chapter.

== Writings ==
Lamb's books and biographies, relating mostly to musical theatre, include the following:

- Jerome Kern in Edwardian London, Littlehampton, 1981; enlarged, Inst. for Studies in Amer. Music (Brooklyn, New York), 1985. ISBN 0-914678-24-8
- Gänzl's Book of the Musical Theatre (with Kurt Gänzl), Bodley Head (London), 1988. ISBN 0-370-31157-4
- The Moulin Rouge (ed.), Alan Sutton / St. Martin's, 1990. ISBN 0-86299-753-4 / ISBN 0-312-04566-2
- Light Music from Austria: Reminiscences and Writings of Max Schönherr (ed.), Peter Lang Pub., 1992. ISBN 0-8204-1671-1
- Skaters' Waltz: The Story of the Waldteufels, Fullers Wood Press (Croydon, England), 1995. ISBN 0-9524149-0-2
- An Offenbach Family Album, Fullers Wood Press, 1997. ISBN 0-9524149-1-0
- Shirley House to Trinity School, Fullers Wood Press, 1999. ISBN 0-9524149-2-9
- 150 Years of Popular Musical Theatre, Yale University Press (New Haven, Connecticut), 2000. ISBN 0-300-07538-3
- Leslie Stuart: Composer of Florodora, London: Routledge, 2002. ISBN 0-415-93747-7
- Leslie Stuart: My Bohemian Life (ed.), Fullers Wood Press, 2003. ISBN 0-9524149-3-7
- Fragson: The Triumphs and the Tragedy (with Julian Myerscough), Fullers Wood Press, 2004. ISBN 0-9524149-4-5
- The Merry Widow at 100, Fullers Wood Press, 2005. ISBN 0-9524149-5-3
- A Life on the Ocean Wave: The Story of Henry Russell, Fullers Wood Press, 2007 ISBN 0-9524149-6-1; second, revised edition, by Kurt Gänzl, SUNY Press, 2026 ISBN 9798855805994
- William Vincent Wallace: Composer, Virtuoso and Adventurer, Fullers Wood Press (West Byfleet, England), 2012. ISBN 978-0-9524149-7-1

He has written extensively for periodicals including Gramophone, The Musical Times, Opera, Music and Letters, The Listener, and Wisden Cricket Monthly. He is a contributor and advisory editor to The Oxford Dictionary of National Biography and wrote more than 150 articles in The New Grove Dictionary of Music and Musicians, including biographies of George M. Cohan, Noël Coward, Jerome Kern, Charles Lecocq, Franz Lehár, Andrew Lloyd Webber, Lionel Monckton and Jacques Offenbach, and articles on revue, musical comedy, music hall, parlour song and operetta. He was a member of the Advisory Board of The New Grove Dictionary of Opera. Online examples of his writing include articles on Gershwin's Cuban vacation, two 1890s English comic opera tours of South America, and the zarzuelas La generala and El maestro Campanone.

He has also compiled albums of songs by Lehár for Glocken Verlag (ISMN M-57006-019-1, ISMN M-57006-109-9, ISMN M-57006-111-2 and ISMN 979-0-57006-115-0) and of operetta numbers by Offenbach for Choudens (ISBN 978-1-84938-035-5).
