= Conchita Gélabert =

French opera singer

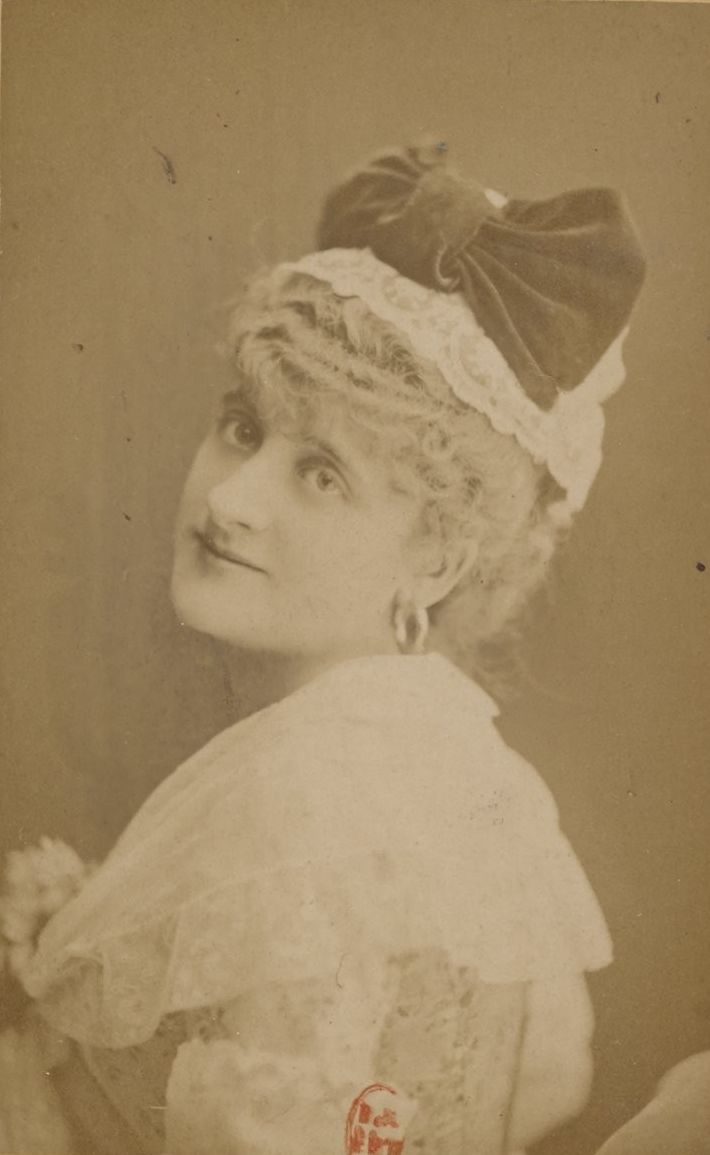
Conchita Gélabert by Nadar

Maria Conchita Gélabert (1857–1922) was a lyrical artist and actress of Spanish origin who performed in France at the end of the 19th century.

== Biography ==
Born in Madrid, Gélabert entered the Conservatoire de Paris in 1873 and obtained a first run off in opéra comique in 1876. In 1877, she was hired at the Théâtre des Folies-Dramatiques where she created Les Cloches de Corneville, then at the Théâtre de la Gaîté, Le Grand Mogol, Le Voyage de Suzette, La Fille du tambour-major.

Because of an unfortunate love story, she abandoned the theatre in 1890, and lived in retirement since then. She died alone and forgotten in Paris.

== Repertoire ==
- 1876: Jeanne, Jeannette et Jeanneton, opéra-comique by Charles Clairville, Alfred Delacour; music by Paul Lacôme, premiere on 27 October 1876, Théâtre des Folies-Dramatiques.
- 1877: Les Cloches de Corneville, opéra-comique by Robert Planquette, libretto by Clairville and Charles Gabet, at the Théâtre des Folies-Dramatiques.
- 1878: Le Buisson d'écrevisses, operetta by Jules-Henry Vachot and Marc Constantin, music by Félix Pardon, premiered at the Théâtre des Bouffes-Parisiens.
- 1879: Madame Favart, opéra-comique in three acts by Jacques Offenbach, libretto by Alfred Duru and Henri Chivot, Théâtre des Folies-Dramatiques .
- 1884: François les bas-bleus opéra-comique by Ernest Dubreuil, Eugène Humbert, Paul Burani, music by Firmin Bernicat, completed by André Messager at the Grand Théâtre de Bordeaux.
- 1884: Le Grand Mogol, operetta in four acts, lyrics by Chivot and Duru, music by Edmond Audran Théâtre de la Gaîté.
- 1885: Niniche, comédie-vaudeville in three acts, by Alfred Hennequin and Albert Millaud, music by Marius Boullard, Grand-Théâtre du Havre.
- 1885: Les Pommes d'Or, opérette-féerie in 3 acts by Chivot, Duru, Henri Blondeau, Hector Monréal, Théâtre des Célestins.
- 1886: La Fille du tambour-major, Théâtre des Célestins.
