= Les cloches de Corneville =

Opéra comique composed by Robert Planquette

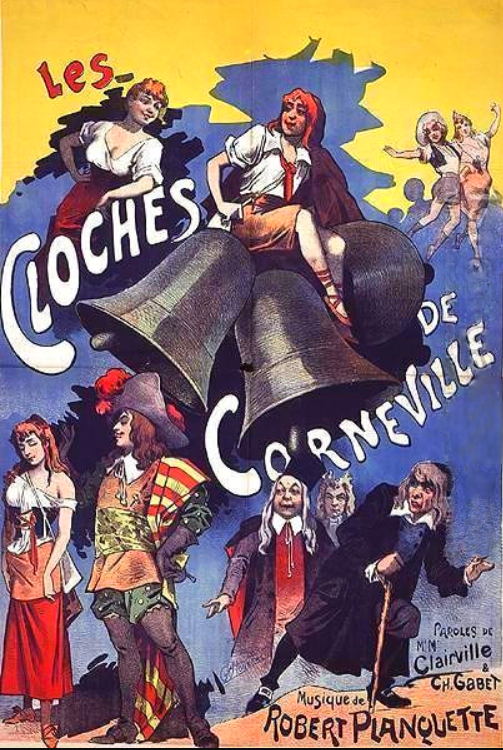
Poster for original production

Les cloches de Corneville (French pronunciation: [le klɔʃ də kɔʁnəvil], The Bells of Corneville, sometimes known in English as The Chimes of Normandy) is an opéra-comique in three acts, composed by Robert Planquette to a libretto by Louis Clairville and Charles Gabet. It premiered in Paris in 1877.

The story, set at the turn of the 18th century, depicts the return of an exiled aristocrat to his ancestral castle, the machinations of the miserly steward to secure the family's fortune for himself, and the changing amorous pairings of the four juvenile leads. Aspects of the plot were criticised by contemporary critics as derivative of earlier operas.

The opera was Planquette's first full-length stage work, and although he later wrote twelve more, including Rip Van Winkle, which was a hit in London, he never equalled the international success of this first venture. It broke box-office records in Paris and London, where it set a new long-run record for musical theatre worldwide, and it was continually revived in Europe and the US during the rest of the 19th century. Since then it has remained in the repertoire for occasional productions in France.

== Background ==
There are conflicting accounts of the genesis of the piece. According to the Académie nationale de l'opérette, Gabet and Clairville had Planquette set their libretto, which they then offered, unsuccessfully, to various managements; it was initially rejected because of its similarity to Boieldieu's La dame blanche and Flotow's Martha. Excerpts from the score were published and sold well, with the result that Charles Cantin, manager of the Théâtre des Folies-Dramatiques, became interested in staging the piece. The alternative account, in the Encyclopédie de l'art lyrique français, is that Cantin accepted the libretto and commissioned Hervé to set it. The authors were unwilling to introduce additional broad comedy effects called for by Hervé, and Cantin, who liked to encourage rising talent, turned to Planquette to set the piece. (Note: The article on the piece in Grove's Dictionary of Music and Musicians corroborates the second account to the extent of referring to "The libretto of Les cloches de Corneville, originally intended for Hervé".)

Juliette Girard as Serpolette, 1877

Since 1867 the Folies-Dramatiques had presented a series of opéras bouffes and comiques; the principal composers were Hervé and Charles Lecocq. (Note: Hervé's L'œil crevé (1867), Chilpéric (1868), Le petit Faust and (1869) La belle poule (1875); and Lecocq's La fille de Madame Angot (1873).) For the new opera Cantin assembled a strong cast. The leading lady of his company, Conchita Gélabert, had just left to retire into private life but was persuaded back, and Cantin had recently recruited an 18-year-old newcomer Juliette Girard, an alumna of the Conservatoire de Paris, who took the other soprano lead. The two tenor roles were taken by the popular Simon-Max and Ernest Vois. Although he wrote twelve more full-length operas, Planquette never equalled the success of this, his first stage work.

== First production ==
The opera was first presented at the Fantaisies-Parisiennes on 19 April 1877, and ran for 596 performances, taking in more than 1.6 million francs at the box office, equal to about 6,700,000 euros in 2015 terms. It was clear well before the final curtain that the piece was a success. Several numbers were repeatedly encored, and the cast were widely praised for their acting and, on the whole, their singing.

== Original cast ==
Role	Voice type	Premiere cast, 19 April 1877 (Conductor: )
Gaspard, a miser	baritone	Ange Milher
Germaine, his niece	soprano	Conchita Gélabert
Serpolette, a foundling	soprano	Juliette Girard (Note: During the run of the piece, Girard married Simon-Max, her onstage lover, and was then billed as Juliette Simon-Girard.)
Henri, Marquis de Corneville	tenor	Ernest Vois
Jean Grenicheux, a fisher lad	tenor	Simon-Max
The bailiff of Corneille	baritone	François-Louis Luco
Gertrude, Jeanne, Manette and Suzanne et al, belles of Corneville
Registrar, Assessor, Notary
Villagers and attendants of the Marquis

== Synopsis ==
Act 1 – Scene 1 – A wooded trail near Castle Corneville, in the time of Louis XIV

Vois, Gélabert, Milher and Luco in the original production

The miserly old Gaspard is steward to the exiled Marquises of Corneville. He maintains possession of the castle and the family's money by convincing the locals that it is haunted. He wants to force his niece, Germaine, to marry the old bailiff, because the latter has become suspicious of Gaspard and threatens to investigate his conduct of the Marquis's affairs. But Germaine feels under an obligation to Jean Grenicheux, an aristocratic young fisherman, who claims that he once rescued her from drowning. Gaspard has a maid named Serpolette, whom he found as a child abandoned in a field. She has grown into a pert beauty and is the object of gossip by the local women, who call her good-for-nothing. She too is enamoured of Grenicheux.

A stranger dressed as a sea captain arrives, whom Germaine attempts to turn away from the castle, saying it is haunted and telling him that the castle's bells will only ring again when the rightful master returns. The stranger is actually Henri, Marquis de Corneville, returning from exile. He has come to retake his castle and fields. He recalls his youth and particularly a young girl who fell into the sea. He pulled her out and never saw her again.

Act 1 – Scene 2 – The market of Corneville
At the market, twice a year, people can hire domestic servants or coachmen. Germaine, Serpolette and Grenicheux all engage themselves to the mysterious Henri, hoping to escape old Gaspard.

Act 2 – A large hall in Castle Corneville
Marquis Henri brings his new employees to the castle at night and reveals his true identity. He tries to reassure them about the ghosts. He has resolved to restore his immense castle, which has been badly neglected in his absence. He discovers a letter in the castle stating that the infant Vicomtesse de Lucenay was at one time in danger and so was entrusted to Gaspard to be brought up under a false name. Everyone thinks this must refer to Serpolette. Henri also finds himself becoming attracted to Germaine. She tells him the story about how Grenicheux saved her, and how she feels obliged to marry him. Henri realises that Germaine is the girl that he himself had rescued and that Grenicheux's claims to have done so are false.

Meanwhile, old Gaspard arrives at night in a boat to visit his gold, thinking the castle is empty. Henri and the others, clad in suits of armour, jump out, ring the bells of the castle and capture the old trickster. The shock drives the old man mad.

Act 3 – The grounds of Castle Corneville
After the renovation of the castle and the ringing of the bells, Henri is recognised as the rightful master of the Castle of Corneville. He gives a feast for the whole village, and his guests rejoice. Gaspard, who has lost his reason, wanders from group to group, singing. Serpolette is assumed to be the Vicomtesse of Lucenay, because the page from the birth register of the village, noting the births of Serpolette and Germaine, has disappeared (Gaspard had stolen it). Grenicheux has become factotum to the Vicomtesse Serpolette and is now courting her.

Henri has fallen in love with Germaine, although she is only a servant in his household. He orders Grenicheux to confess his deception, but not to reveal the name of the actual rescuer. Germaine overhears their conversation. Henri asks Germaine to be his wife, but she demurs, believing that a servant cannot marry a Marquis. Gaspard, recovering his senses, remorsefully declares that his pretended niece is the rightful Vicomtesse de Lucenay (and Serpolette simply a gypsy orphan), and so the Marquis may wed Germaine. Henri forgives Gaspard, Serpolette takes Grenicheux, and all ends happily, as the bells of Corneville are set ringing.

== Musical numbers ==
Poster for original 1877 production

Simon-Max as Grenicheux, 1877

- Overture
- Act 1, Scene 1: A forest near the village of Corneville
  - 1. Chorus – "C’est le marché de Corneville" – "On dit, sans contredit" (This is Corneville market – They say, without a doubt)
  - 2. Rondo – "Dans ma mystérieuse histoire" (In my mysterious history) – Serpolette
  - 3. Chanson du mousse – "Va, petit mousse" (Go, little cabin boy) – Grenicheux
  - 4. Duet – "Même sans consulter mon coeur" (Even without asking my heart) – Germaine, Grenicheux
  - 5. Légende des cloches – "Nous avons hélas! perdu d'excellents maîtres" (Legend of the bells – We have, alas, lost excellent masters) – Germaine, chorus
  - 6. Rondo-waltz – "J'ai fait trois fois le tour du monde" (I've been round the world three times) – Henri
  - 7. Chorus – "C’est affreux, odieux" (It's awful, odious!)
- Act 1, Scene 2: The Fair of Corneville
  - Entr'acte
  - 8. Couplets – "Je ne sais comment faire" (I don't know how) – Grenicheux
  - 9a. Chorus "Sur le marche de Corneville (On Corneville market)
  - 9b. Chorus "Vous qui voulez des servantes" (You who want servants)
  - 9c. Finale – "Jeune fille, dis-moi ton nom" (Tell me your name, young woman)
- Act 2 – A Hall in the Chateau of Corneville
  - 10. Chorus – "À la lueur de ces flambeaux" (By the light of these torches)
  - 10b. Air – "Ne parlez pas de mon courage" (Do not speak of my courage) – Germaine
  - 10c. Trio – "Fermons les yeux" (Close your eyes – Serpolette, Grenicheux, Bailiff)
  - 10d. Song – "Pristi, sapristi" (Serpolette)
  - 11. Song – "J'avais perdu la tête et ma perruque" (I have lost my head and my wig) – Bailiff
  - 12. Song – "Sous des armures à leur taille" (Wearing armour that fits them) – Henri, chorus
  - 13. Ensemble and couplets – "Vicomtesse et marquise" (Viscountess and marquis) – Serpolette, Henri, chorus
  - 14. Duet – "C'est elle et son destin le guide" (It is she, and her destiny guides her) – Germaine, Henri
  - 15. Chorus and quintet – Gloire au valeureux Grenicheux" (Glory to the brave) – Grenicheux
  - 16. Finale and couplets –"C'est là, c’est là qu'est la richesse" (This is where the money is) – Gaspard, Grenicheux, chorus
- Act 3 – A Park, with a statue and shrubbery
  - Entr'acte and dance
  - 17. Chanson des gueux – "Enfin, nous voilà transportés" (Song of the beggars – At last we are transported) – Gaspard
  - 18. Chorus – "Regardez donc quel équipage" (Look what a crew)
  - 18b. Song – "oui, c'est moi, c'est Serpolette" (Yes, it's me, it's Serpolette) – Serpolette
  - 19. Chanson du cidre – "La pomme est un fruit plein de sève" (Cider song – The apple is a fruit full of juice) – Serpolette and chorus
  - 20. Rondo-waltz – "Je regardais en l'air" (I have looked in the air) – Grenicheux
  - 21. Romance and duet – "Une servante, que m'importe" (A maid – what do I care!) – Germaine, Henri
  - 22. Final de l'acte III – "Pour le tresor que tu nous abandonnes" (For the treasure you leave us)

== Revivals and adaptations ==
Charles Constant Gobin (Bailiff) and M. Larbaudière (Grenicheux) in 1889 revival at the Folies-Dramatiques

Productions outside France soon followed the premiere. Brussels first saw the piece in October 1877, at the Théâtre des Fantaisies Parisiennes. In the same month, it was given in English as The Chimes of Normandy at the Fifth Avenue Theatre in New York. There was also another New York run in 1878. Later productions included one as The Bells of Corneville at the Victoria Theatre in New York, beginning on 21 April 1902. Oscar Hammerstein I mounted a production at the Manhattan Opera House as part of a season of opéra comique in 1909.

In 1878 productions opened in London, Berlin and Vienna. The London production opened at the Folly Theatre, on 28 February under the original French title but with an English libretto by H. B. Farnie and Robert Reece that closely followed the original. The production transferred to the larger Globe Theatre in August as The Chimes of Normandy. Edward Solomon conducted; Violet Cameron and Shiel Barry starred as Germaine and Gaspard. It played for a total of 705 performances, setting a new world record for a musical theatre run, which was not overtaken until Dorothy, ten years later. The first Berlin production opened in March 1878 at the Friedrich-Wilhelm-Städtisches Theater and the first in Vienna was in September at the Theater an der Wien.

In Paris there were frequent new productions during the rest of the century. Within ten years of the premiere it had passed its 1,000th performance in Parisian theatres. The opera remained in the repertoire into the 1940s in Britain and the 1960s in France, and it still receives some productions today.

== Critical reception ==
The contemporary reviews were mixed. Les Annales du théâtre et de la musique commented, "M. Planquette probably thinks he has written music … but 'musiqette' would be an appropriate term. His score is a collection of derivative polkas, waltzes and rondos." The same critic praised the performers, who, he said were good enough to stop him collecting his hat and cane and leaving. The critic Alfred Mortier suggested that the piece might be called "The Elderly Dame Blanche" or the "Gioconda of Quillebeuf". Félix Clément, in his Dictionnaire des opéras (1880), called the piece a plagiarism of Martha and La dame blanche adapted for the benefit of lovers of the suggestive. He thought the popularity of the work worrying and "harmful to the interests of real composers". The Paris correspondent of The Era found the score "agreeable, not very original, but melodious" and commended the excellent taste of the orchestrations. Reviewing the London production, The Theatre thought the composer gifted, although stronger in writing melodies than in harmony or orchestration; he found "his sparkling music has the effervescence of champagne". When the piece opened in Vienna a reviewer commented on the resemblance of the plot to La dame blanche and Martha, and found the music unoriginal but natural and pleasing.

In Operetta: A Theatrical History (2016), Richard Traubner considers Planquette had a gift for "rhythmic variety and the pulsations that keep songs alive" but was less outstanding as a melodist, and deficient in the areas of harmony and orchestration. (Note: There is no evidence that Planquette had any help with the orchestration of Les cloches de Corneville, but during his career some parts of his scores were given to assistants to orchestrate.) Reviewing a CD release of a recording of the work, Raymond Walker wrote, "The score just flowed with sparkling melodies, variety of rhythm, novel orchestral texture and bright colour. Throughout lovely motifs like the one representing the Bells weave in and out of the music."

== Recordings and films ==
There have been two recordings of the complete score. The first, a mono set in 1955, featured Huguette Boulangeot (Germaine), Ernest Blanc (Henri); Jean Giraudeau (Grenicheux); Colette Riedinger (Serpolette), André Balbon (bailiff) and Louis Musy (Gaspard), with an unnamed chorus and orchestra conducted by Pierre Dervaux. A stereo set from 1973 featured Mady Mesplé (Germaine), Bernard Sinclair (Henri), Charles Burles (Grenicheux), Christiane Stutzmann (Serpolette), Jean Giraudeau (bailiff), and Jean-Christophe Benoît (Gaspard), with the chorus and orchestra of the Théâtre national de l'opéra de Paris, conducted by Jean Doussard.

The first experiment in synchronising sound and motion pictures in 1894 featured one of the songs from Les cloches de Corneville. In what is now called The Dickson Experimental Sound Film, William Kennedy Dickson was filmed and recorded playing the "Chanson du mousse" on the violin, while two of his colleagues danced to it. In 1917 Thomas Bentley directed a silent film of the opera.

== Notes, references and sources ==
=== Sources ===
- Gänzl, Kurt; Andrew Lamb (1988). Gänzl's Book of the Musical Theatre. London: The Bodley Head. OCLC 966051934.
- Noël, Edouard; Edmond Stoullig (1878). Les annales du théâtre et de la musique (in French). Paris: Charpentier. OCLC 567413682.
- Traubner, Richard (2016). Operetta: A Theatrical History. London: Routledge. ISBN 978-1-138-13892-6.
