= The Three Musketeers (1932 film) =

1932 film

- Directed by: Henri Diamant-Berger
- Written by: Auguste Maquet (play); Henri Diamant-Berger
- Based on: The Three Musketeers by Alexandre Dumas
- Produced by: Fernand Méric
- Starring: Aimé Simon-Girard; Henri Rollan; Thomy Bourdelle
- Cinematography: Maurice Desfassiaux
- Edited by: Rosa Bozzano; Jack Léonard
- Music by: Jean Lenoir
- Production company: Films Diamant
- Distributed by: Monopol Film
- Release date: 9 December 1932
- Running time: 246 minutes
- Country: France
- Language: French

The Three Musketeers (French: Les trois mousquetaires) is a 1932 French historical adventure film directed by Henri Diamant-Berger and starring Aimé Simon-Girard, Henri Rollan and Thomy Bourdelle.The film is an adaptation of Alexandre Dumas's 1844 novel The Three Musketeers, and was the first version to be as a sound film. It was shot at the Epinay Studios of Eclair in Paris. The film's sets were designed by the art director Marc Lauer.

It is a remake of Diamant-Berger's own silent film-series The Three Musketeers (1921), again with Aimé Simon-Girard and Henri Rollan as D'Artagnan and Athos.

== Cast ==
- Aimé Simon-Girard as d'Artagnan - le chef des trois mousquetaires
- Henri Rollan as Athos - l'un des trois mousquetaires
- Thomy Bourdelle as Porthos - l'un des trois mousquetaires
- Jean-Louis Allibert as Aramis - l'un des trois mousquetaires
- Blanche Montel as Constance Bonacieux
- Edith Méra as Milady de Winter - une aventurière sans foi ni loi
- Andrée Lafayette as La reine Anne d'Autriche (Anne of Austria)
- Esther Kiss as Ketty
- Marcelle Monthil as Dona Estefana
- Geneviève Félix as La supérieure
- Lulu Vattier as Mme Coquenard
- Hélène Larra as La duchesse de Chevreuse
- Renée Varville as Mme de Launois - l'espionne du Cardinal
- Georges Tourreil as Felton
- Robert Ozanne as de Wardes
- Paul Colline as Planchet
- Henri Baudin as Le comte de Rochefort
- Maurice Escande as Buckingham
- Harry Baur as Tréville
- Fernand Francell as Le roi Louis XIII
- Serjius as Mousqueton
- Bill Bocket as Grimaud
- Teddy Michaud as Giovanni
- Romain Bouquet as M. Bonacieux
- Samson Fainsilber as Cardinal Richelieu
- Tony Pary as de Winter
- Edmond Van Daële as Le père Joseph
- René Hiéronimus as Bazin
- Odette Olga
- Colette Salomon
- Germaine Risse
- Laurent Morléas
- Joffre
- Jean Arbuleau
- Ernest Faguais
- Alexandre Mathillon
- Nicolas Redelsperger
- André Lorière

== Bibliography ==
- K. L. Maund & Phil Nanson. The Four Musketeers: The True Story of D'Artagnan, Porthos, Aramis & Athos. Tempus, 2005.
