= The Adventurer (1934 film) =

1934 film directed by Marcel L'Herbier

- Directed by: Marcel L'Herbier
- Written by: Marcel L'Herbier
- Based on: The Adventurer by Alfred Capus
- Starring: Victor Francen; Blanche Montel; Henri Rollan
- Cinematography: Armand Thirard
- Music by: Jean Wiener
- Production company: Pathé-Natan
- Distributed by: Pathé-Natan
- Release date: 18 June 1934
- Running time: 82 minutes
- Country: France
- Language: French

The Adventurer (French: L'Aventurier) is a 1934 French drama film directed by Marcel L'Herbier and starring Victor Francen, Blanche Montel and Henri Rollan. It was shot at the Joinville Studios in Paris and on location around Grenoble. The film's sets were designed by the art directors Lucien Aguettand and Robert Hubert. It is based on a 1910 play of the same title by Alfred Capus.

== Synopsis ==
After more than a decade away, having been disowned by his family, Étienne Ranson returns to Grenoble from French Africa having made a fortune. He discovers that his uncle's glovemaking business is now in serious trouble. Despite being rejected as the black sheep of his family, he is now regarded as a potential saviour.

== Cast ==
- Victor Francen as Étienne Ranson/Pierre Stols
- Blanche Montel as Marthe
- Henri Rollan as André Varèse
- Gisèle Casadesus as Geneviève
- Alexandre Rignault: Karl Nemo
- Kissa Kouprine as Madame Nemo
- Abel Tarride as Guéroy
- Lucien Pascal as Jacques Guéroy
- Jean Joffre as Framié
- Pierre Juvenet as the prefect
- Paul Oettly as the leader
- D'Ambreville as the old worker
- Jean Marais as the young worker
- Huchet as Félix

== Bibliography ==
- Crisp, Colin. French Cinema—A Critical Filmography: Volume 1, 1929-1939. Indiana University Press, 2015.
