= Juliette Simon-Girard =

French opera singer

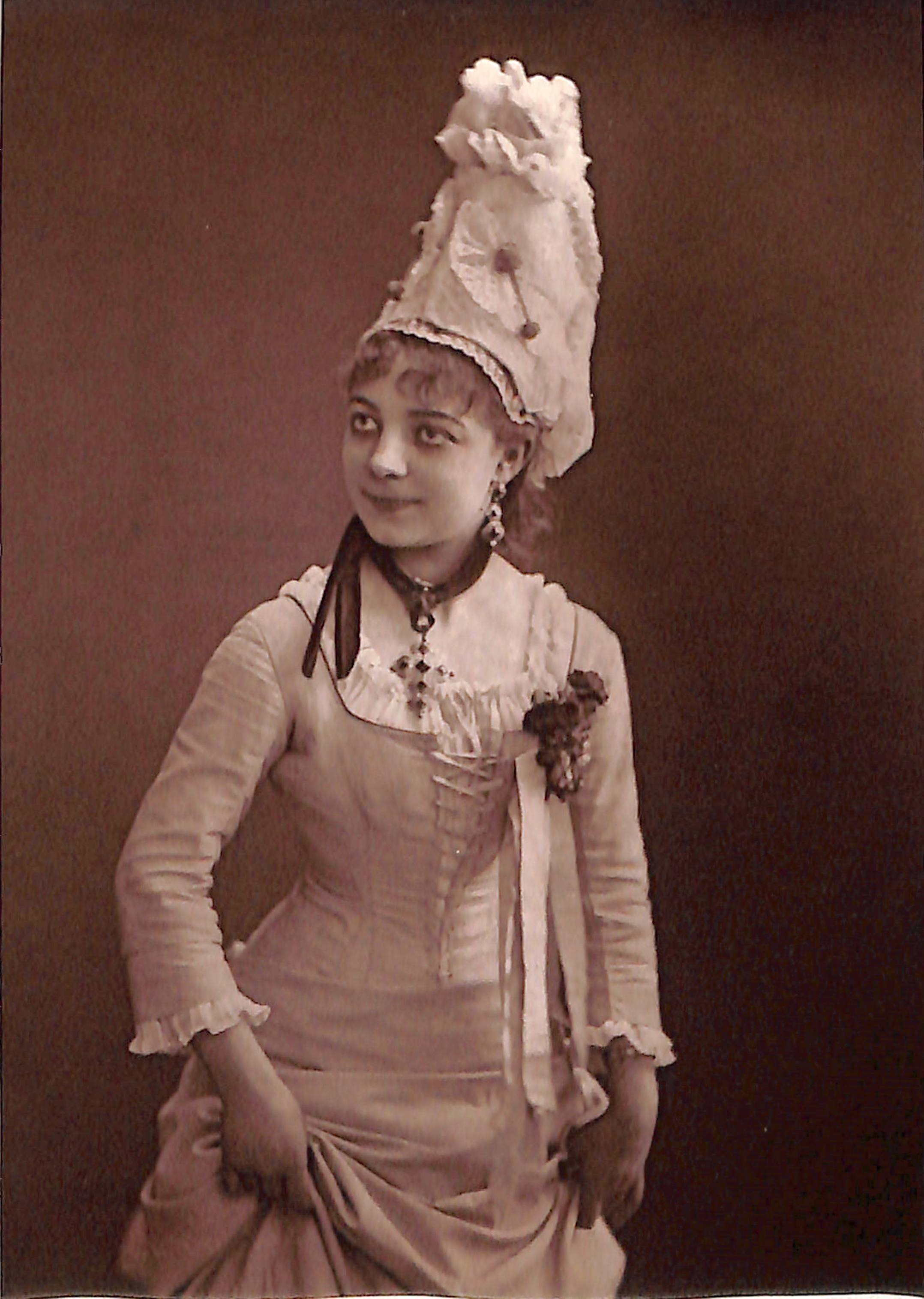
Juliette Simon-Girard at the Théâtre des Folies-Dramatiques

Juliette-Joséphine Simon-Girard (French pronunciation: [ʒyljɛt ʒozefin simɔ̃ ʒiʁaʁ]; 8 May 1859 – 1954) was a French soprano, principally in operetta. Her father, Philippe Lockroy, was an actor at the Comédie Française, and her mother was Caroline Girard, of the Opéra-Comique.

== Career ==
Girard was born at Paris. After studies at the Conservatoire in 1876 (in the class of Henri de Régnier) she made her debut at the Théâtre des Folies-Dramatiques as Carlinette in Offenbach's La foire Saint-Laurent on 10 February 1877, and then became an overnight star by creating the role of Serpolette in Les cloches de Corneville on 19 April 1877. During the run of Les cloches de Corneville she met and married the well-known tenor Simon-Max, thereafter becoming Mme Simon-Girard.

At the age of 19, she created the title role in Offenbach's Madame Favart; then La fille du tambour-major in 1879 becoming one of Paris's most popular performers, prominent on the city's stages for 30 years.

At the Folies-Dramatiques she also created roles in Beau Nicolas (1880), Les poupées de l'infante (1881), Fanfan la tulipe (1882), La princesse des Canaries (1883); moving to the Théâtre des Nouveautés she was in the premiere of La vie mondaine. On return to the Folies-Dramatiques she replaced Ugalde in Les petits mousquetaires and then created the title role in La fauvette du temple (17 November 1885). After singing with her husband in the premiere of La chatte blanche, at the Théâtre du Châtelet on 2 April 1887, she spent a year in Belgium which included the premiere of Lecocq's Ali-Baba.

Simon-Girard's return to Paris was at the Théâtre de la Gaîté in 1888 in revivals of Le grand Mogul and La fille du tambour-major, before creating the title role in Voyage de Suzette on 20 January 1890. After several productions at the Théâtre de la Renaissance (where she created Mlle Asmodée in 1891 and La femme de Narcisse in 1892, and revived La jolie parfumeuse in 1892, she went back to the Folies-Dramatiques and created Eva in Varney's Miss Robinson on 17 July 1892.

From 1893, she was at the Théâtre des Bouffes Parisiens with more premieres including Olga in Pessard's Mam'zelle Carabin (3 November 1893). She met her second husband Félix Huguenet while performing in L'enlèvement de la Toledad in 1894, and from then on took on more comedy acting parts.

In November 1899 she took the title role at the Théâtre des Variétés in a major and successful revival of La belle Hélène, which ran for over five hundred performances.

In 1903, Simon-Girard made recordings of songs from Offenbach operettas (Barbe-bleue, Belle Hélène, Madame Favart, La Jolie Parfumeuse, La Périchole and La Grande-Duchesse), excerpts from Les cloches de Corneville, and songs by Messager, Audran and Lecocq.

Complete discography (all 23 titles were cut in Paris, in 1903, for the Gramophone & Typewriter Company)
Catalogue number	Matrix number	Title, excerpt, composer
33189	1740F	Madame Boniface : Couplets de la Marguerite (Lacôme)
33190	1741F	Miss Robinson : Valse des ramiers (Varney)
33309	1751F	La Belle Hélène : Amours divins (Offenbach)
33310	1752F	Madame Favart : Ronde des vignes (Offenbach)
33311	1753F	La Femme de Narcisse : C'est la fille à ma tante (Varney)
33312	1754F	La Fille de Madame Angot : Jadis les rois (Lecocq)
33313	1755F	Malagueña - Valse chantée (Fahrbach)
33316	1830F	Les Cloches de Corneville : On dit (Planquette)
33317	1831F	Les Cloches de Corneville Dans ma mystérieuse histoire
33327	1912F	La Jolie Parfumeuse : La famille Bruscambille (Offenbach)
33328	1913F	La Fauvette au Temple : Valse de la fauvette (Messager)
33329	1914F	La Fauvette au Temple : Rondeau des blés
33330	1915F	Les Cloches de Corneville : Chanson du cidre (Planquette)
33331	1916F	Le grand Mogol : Le petit vin de Suresnes (Audran)
33332	1917F	Le Voyage de Suzette : Valse d'ivresse (Baggers)
34018	1918F	La Mascotte : Duo des dindons (Audran) [duet with Jean Delvoye]
33358	2029F	Les Dragons de Villars : Couplets de l'hermite (Maillart)
33359	2030F	Carmen : Je dis que rien ne m'épouvante (Bizet)
33371	2113F	Le Grand Mogol : Allons, petit serpent (Audran)
33372	2114F	La Périchole : Air de la lettre (Offenbach)
33373	2115F	La Périchole : Couplets de l'aveu
33374	2116F	La Grande-Duchesse de Gérolstein : Légende du verre (Offenbach)
33375	2117F	La Grande-Duchesse de Gérolstein : Dites-lui

She died at Nice. Her son was Aimé Simon-Girard.
