= Monique de Pondeau =

- Born: Monique Germaine Albane Soueix de Pondeau; January 3, 1929; Versailles, France
- Died: December 16, 1988 (aged 59) Saint-Laurent-et-Benon, Gironde, France
- Education: Conservatoire de Paris
- Occupations: Opera singer, voice teacher
- Spouse: André Dran

Monique de Pondeau (3 January 1929 – 16 December 1988) was a French soprano, active mainly from the 1950s to the 1970s, and a voice teacher at the Bordeaux Conservatoire.

== Biography ==
Born Monique Germaine Albane Soueix de Pondeau in Versailles, she studied voice and began performing on French stages in the mid-1950s. In 1956, she performed the role of Passerole in the opera Le Chevalier de neige at the Grand Théâtre de Nancy under the direction of Jésus Etcheverry. The production was revived at the Opéra-Comique during the 1960–1961 season.

She joined the company of the Paris Opera. There, she sang the role of Elvire in La Muette de Portici in 1971, performing alongside André Mallabrera and Pierre Lamy under the direction of Jean Doussard. The same year, she portrayed Claudine in La Fille du tambour-major alongside Christiane Harbell and Louis Musy, conducted by Richard Blareau. Earlier in 1962, she performed the role of Monica in Gian Carlo Menotti's The Medium at the Opéra-Comique, appearing alongside Denise Scharley and Solange Michel.

After 1971, de Pondeau turned her focus toward teaching. She became a voice professor at the Bordeaux Conservatoire, where she trained several notable students, including Agnès Massias-Bognenko, who won multiple awards in her class.

She died on 16 December 1988 in Saint-Laurent-et-Benon (Gironde).

== Personal life ==
Monique de Pondeau was the mother of the operatic tenor Thierry Dran. Through him, she was the grandmother of tenor Julien Dran, continuing three generations of opera singers within the family.

== Repertoire ==
Operatic roles performed by Monique de Pondeau
Year	Work	Role	Venue	Ref.
1956	Le Chevalier de neige	Passerole	Grand Théâtre de Nancy	
1960–1961	Le Chevalier de neige	Passerole	Opéra-Comique	
1962	The Medium (Le Médium)	Monica	Opéra-Comique	
1971	La Muette de Portici	Elvire	Opéra de Paris	
1971	La Fille du tambour-major	Claudine	Opéra de Paris	

== Recordings ==
Commercial recordings
Year	Work	Role	Conductor	Label	Ref.
1971	La Muette de Portici	Elvire	Jean Doussard	Accord	
1971	La Fille du tambour-major	Claudine	Richard Blareau	Accord	
