= Aimé Simon-Girard =

French actor

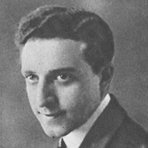
- Born: Aimé Max Simon; 20 March 1889; Paris, France
- Died: 15 July 1950 (aged 61); Paris
- Occupation: actor
- Years active: 1921—1948 (in film)

Aimé Simon-Girard (20 March 1889 – 15 July 1950) was a French film actor. He was the son of the tenor Nicholas Simon-Max and the soprano Juliette Simon-Girard.

He played a leading role as d'Artagnan in the silent film Les Trois Mousquetaires (1921), the first film adaptation of the novel and his screen breakthrough role.

He starred in 20 films between 1921 and 1948.

== Selected filmography ==
- Les Trois Mousquetaires (1921)
- Fanfan la Tulipe (1925)
- The Three Musketeers (1932)
- Arsene Lupin, Detective (1937)
- Francis the First (1937)
- The Pearls of the Crown (1937)
- Alexis, Gentleman Chauffeur (1938)
- The Black Cavalier (1945)
- Mandrin (1947)
