= Jean Joffre =

French actor (1872–1944)

- Born: 12 November 1872; Rivesaltes, France
- Died: 21 February 1944 (aged 71); Paris, France
- Occupation: Actor
- Years active: 1911–1943 (film)

Jean Joffre (1872–1944) often styled simply as Joffre was a French film and stage actor. A character actor he played a variety of supporting roles in theatre and the cinema during his career. His final screen appearance was in the 1943 film The Count of Monte Cristo.

== Selected filmography ==
- The Little Cafe (1919)
- Les Trois Mousquetaires (1921)
- My Aunt from Honfleur (1923)
- Le Miracle des loups (1924)
- Education of a Prince (1927)
- When Love Is Over (1931)
- The Dream (1931)
- Moonlight (1932)
- The Three Musketeers (1932)
- The Adventurer (1934)
- Little Jacques (1934)
- Gaspard de Besse (1935)
- Lovers and Thieves (1935)
- The Assault (1936)
- Samson (1936)
- Culprit (1937)
- Marthe Richard (1937)
- Abused Confidence (1938)
- Adrienne Lecouvreur (1938)
- Rasputin (1938)
- Orage (1938)
- The City of Lights (1938)
- The New Rich (1938)
- Behind the Facade (1939)
- The End of the Day (1939)
- Thérèse Martin (1939)
- The Phantom Wagon (1939)
- Beating Heart (1940)
- Narcisse (1940)
- The Black Diamond (1941)
- Colonel Pontcarral (1942)
- The Benefactor (1942)
- The Count of Monte Cristo (1943)

== Bibliography ==
- Crisp, Colin. French Cinema—A Critical Filmography: Volume 1, 1929-1939. Indiana University Press, 2015.
- Goble, Alan. The Complete Index to Literary Sources in Film. Walter de Gruyter, 1999.
