= Rip Van Winkle (operetta) =

Operetta by Robert Planquette

Fred Leslie as Rip Van Winkle, 1882

Rip Van Winkle is an operetta in three acts by Robert Planquette. The English language libretto by Henri Meilhac, Philippe Gille and Henry Brougham Farnie was based on the short stories "The Legend of Sleepy Hollow" (1820) and "Rip Van Winkle" (1819) by Washington Irving after the play by Dion Boucicault and Joseph Jefferson.

It first played at the Comedy Theatre in London in 1882 and ran for 328 performances, starring Fred Leslie in the title role. It then toured and was revived in Britain. It also played in New York, Vienna, Dresden, and in Paris, where it was revived in productions over the next 50 years.

== Background and performance history ==
The piece was based on a non-musical adaptation of Washington Irving's stories presented by Dion Boucicault, which ran in London for 172 performances in 1865 and, in a revised version, 154 performances in 1875. The libretto for the operetta was by Henri Meilhac, Philippe Gille and H. B. Farnie.

The piece opened at the Comedy Theatre in London on 14 October 1882 and ran for 328 performances. It starred Fred Leslie, Violet Cameron, W. S. Penley, Lionel Brough and Sadie Martinot. Richard D'Oyly Carte organised a touring production in 1883 with D. A. Arnold as Rip and a supporting cast headed by Fred Billington, Lottie Venne and David Fisher. The work was revived at the Comedy in 1884, with Leslie again in the lead.

There was a brief New York run in 1882 starring J. H. Ryley, Richard Mansfield and Selina Dolaro. There were productions in Vienna and Dresden.

In 1884 the piece was given in Paris under the title Rip with a French libretto by Meilhac, Gille and Farnie at the Théâtre des Folies-Dramatiques, opening on 11 November and running for 120 performances. The cast included Simon-Max and Mily-Meyer. The work was revised and revived in Paris in 1894, and for seven more productions between 1900 and 1938.

In 2023, Rip Van Winkle was revived by Gothic Opera, with performances in London at Hoxton Hall.

== Roles and original cast ==
Fred Leslie as the old Rip

- Rip Van Winkle (A Village Good-For-Nothing) – Fred Leslie
- Derrick Van Slous (The Village Lawyer and Rip's Rival) – W. S. Penley
- Peter Van Dunk (Burgomaster of Sleepy Hollow) – Louis Kelleher
- Diedrich Knickerbocker (Village Schoolmaster and Local Poet) – E. Wilmore
- Captain Hugh Rowley (Of the British Army) – Fred Darrell
- Nick Vedder (Landlord of The "George III" Inn) – Lionel Brough
- Gretchen (Wife of Rip Van Winkle) – Violet Cameron
- Sara And Jacintha (Two of her Gossips) – Clara Graham and Constance Lewis
- Katrina (A Village Flirt - Daughter of Nick Vedder) – Sadie Martinot (later, Camille Dubois)
- Little Hardcase (Clerk to Derrick) – Madge Milton
- Hans (His Nephew) – Effie Mason
- Alice (Rip's Little Daughter) – Alice Vicat
- Tom Tit (Bugler to Rowley's Company) – Rose Moncrieff
- Leedle Jan (Katrina's Brother) – Master Gollop
- Gape (Waitress At The "George III" Inn) – Grace Hawke
- Captain Hendrick Hudson – S. H. Perry
- Four Lieutenants – W. S. Rising, Constance Lewis, Clara Graham and Rose Moncrieff
- Cabin Boy – Madge Milton
- The Goblin Steward – Mr. Storey
- Master Gunner – M. Villa
- Max Schneider (Rural Postman) – Clara Graham
- Chicken (Potboy at the "George Washington Hotel") – Rose Moncrieff
- Mopps (Chambermaid at the Inn) – Madge Milton

The following cast changes occur as children in Act I later become adults:

- Alice Van Winkle (Daughter of Rip) – Violet Cameron
- Lieut. Hans Van Slous (Now of the U.S. Frigate "Constitution") – W. S. Rising
- Jan Vedder (Now Proprietor of the "George Washington Hotel") – Lionel Brough

== Musical numbers ==
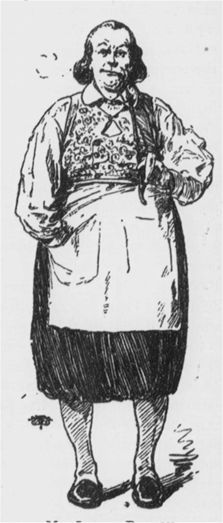
Lionel Brough as Nick Vedder

- Overture

Act I

- No. 1. Chorus, Scene and Couplets - "Far and near our cry be heard, Long life to great George the Third!"
- No. 2. Exit of Peasants, etc. - "Yes, it is a common thing, thus to use one's Queen or King"
- No. 3. Rip Van Winkle - "Oh! where's my girl of whom I'm fond? Wherever can my darling be?"
- No. 4. Canoe Song - Gretchen & Rip - "Where floweth the wild Mohawk river, a-down the long rushes that quiver"
- No. 5. Chorus of Cowards - "Can't you see we're coming? (Hang their horrid drumming)"
- No. 6. Legend of the Kaatskils - Gretchen & Chorus - "From deep forest hoary, lift in awful glory mountains grey and old"
- No. 7. Rip Van Winkle & Children - "Ere the marriage contract is drawn, what have you got to live upon?"
- No. 8. Rondo - Katrina & Chorus - "'Tis the hour we girls ne'er fail, with a pitcher and a tale, at the old draw-well"
- No. 9. Finale Act I - "When I come back 'twill be no more to roam; thenceforth to stay with thee at home"

Act II - Scene 1

- Entr'acte & Melodrame
- No. 10. Lantern Chorus & Ballad - Gretchen & Katrina - "By the thicket path we are trudging slow"
- No. 10½. Exit & Reprise - "Our search in vain, let's home again! By the thicket path we are trudging slow"
- No. 11. Patrol Chorus - "Keep all in step! Keep all in step! Keep all in step! The night is dark and low'ring"
- No. 12. Gretchen, Rip & Derrick - "Now won't you come along with me? You do not care for me I see!"
- No. 13. Echo Song - Rip van Winkle & Chorus - "Ho! ho! ho! ho! Friend echoes, why do ye fail?"
- No. 13½. Melodrame - (The Demon Dwarf)

Act II - Scene 2

- No. 14. Scene - Rip & Chorus, and Sea Song - Hudson, - "Hendrick Hudson I am call'd, from the underwaters hailing"
- No. 15. Nine-Pins Song - 2nd. Lieutenant & Chorus - "Say, my lads, what game we'll play?"
- No. 16. Serenade - 1st. Lieutenant & Chorus - "I've had lady-loves in my day, with lips rose-red and a lustrous eye"
- No. 17. Pas Seul - Danse des Buveurs, and Pas de Fascination
- No. 18. Finale Act II - "Sunk to sleep on the ground, he's spell-bound! Slumber, mortal bold"

Act III - Scene 1

- Entr'acte and Woodcutters' Chorus - "Before our broad axes, lo! they fall, the kings of the forest, old and tall!"

Act III - Scene 2

- No. 19. Election Chorus, Couplets & Ensemble - Katrina - "Whatsoever may be won in this afternoon's elections"
- No. 20. Rondo - Katrina & Chorus - "Folks do say, who are wise and able, that when tongues got all mixt at Babel"
- No. 21. Letter Song - Alice - "I dare not break the seal! What fear, what doubt I feel... I've liv'd so long with sorrow"
- No. 22. Hammock Song - Lieutenant van Slous & Chorus - "Oh, proud and high the feeling, o'er the sailor stealing"
- No. 22½. Melodrame - Entrance of Rip Van Winkle
- No. 23. Rip - "The thirsty sun burns on the noon-tide brink, yet hotter, yet hotter! ..."
- No. 24. Alice, Van Slous, & Rip - "I know you not! My father's dead! ... Old man, I fear your reason's fled!"
- No. 25. Chorus - "Some say, now that the voting is done, the finish will be exciting"
- No. 26. Finale Act III - "From deep forest hoary, lift in awful glory, mountains grey and old, that myst'ry and tradition hold!"

== Recordings and broadcasts ==
Extended extracts from Rip in French were issued in 1958 by Pathé Records, with Michel Dens as Rip, Claude Devos, Jean-Christophe Benoît and Liliane Berton, conducted by Jules Gressier. A 1961 radio broadcast with Charles Daguerressar as Rip, Lina Dachary, Freda Betti, and Claudine Collart, conducted by Marcel Cariven, was issued on CD in 1991 by Musidisc/Gaieté Lyrique.

The CHARM database of old recordings lists solos and arrangements from the work from the earliest days of recording, with performers including Gabriel Soulacroix, Peter Dawson, Florrie Forde, Seymour Hicks, the Musique de la Garde Républicaine and the Band of the Coldstream Guards.

== Sources ==
- Gänzl, Kurt; Andrew Lamb (1988). Gänzl's Book of the Musical Theatre. London: The Bodley Head. OCLC 966051934.
- Herbert, Ian, ed. (1972). Who's Who in the Theatre (fifteenth ed.). London: Sir Isaac Pitman and Sons. ISBN 978-0-273-31528-5.
