= De afwezige =

- Directed by: Albert Capellani
- Written by: George Mitchell (play)
- Starring: Henri Étiévant; Henri Rollan; Jeanne Grumbach
- Distributed by: Dutch Film Société; Pathé Paris
- Release date: 2 May 1913
- Running time: 40 minutes
- Countries: Netherlands; France
- Language: Silent

De Afwezige is a 1913 Dutch silent drama film directed by Albert Capellani. It was released on 2 May 1913.

== Plot ==
Dries, a farmer and widower, lives with his mother-in-law, Grietje, and his son Peter. He falls in love with Minna, a widow, and marries her despite the opposition of his family and friends. In anger, his son, Peter, leaves home to enlist, while Grietje takes up her residence in another cottage. Six years pass, during which Grietje becomes acquainted with Minna's daughter Dina (en bemiddelt tussen de twee families). Peter falls ill in Sumatra, but after falling in love with Dina, through photographs, he recovers and is drafted home again to Holland. He meets Dina and the two find that they truly love. Minna now sets herself to bring about a general reunion, and she eventually succeeds in doing so.

== Cast ==
- Henri Étiévant as Dries Schoonejans
- Henri Rollan as Peter Schoonejans
- Jeanne Grumbach as Schoonmoeder Grietje/Mother-in-law Grietje
- Germaine Dermoz as Minna Petrus
- Raymonde Dupré as Dina
- Henri Collen
