= La fauvette du temple =

Opéra comique in three acts with music by André Messager

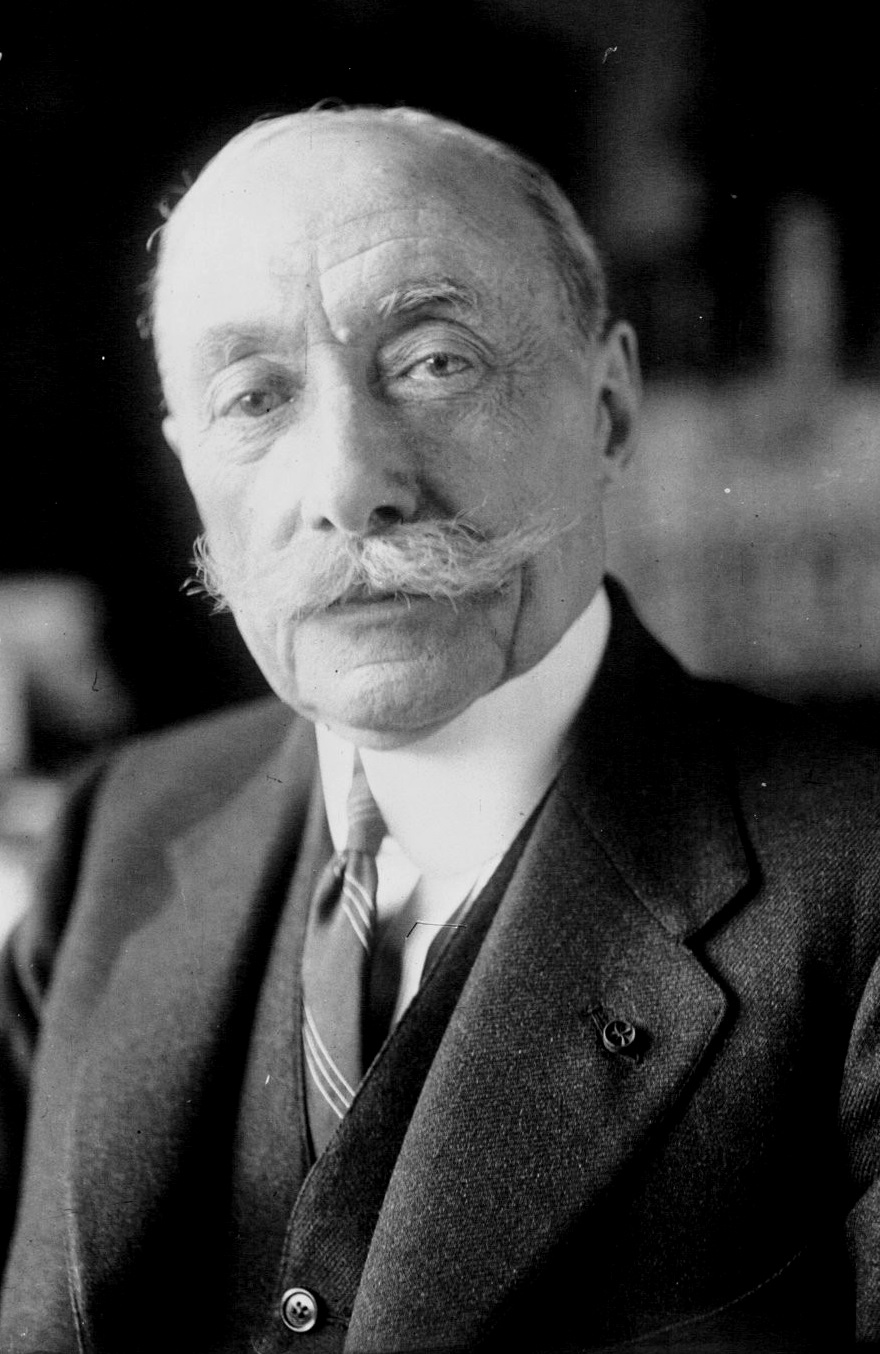
André Messager, 1921

La fauvette du temple (French pronunciation: [la fovɛt dy tɑ̃pl]) is an opéra comique in three acts of 1885, with music by André Messager and a French libretto by Paul Burani and Eugène Humbert.

The libretto bears some similarities to the outline of a vaudeville in three acts by the Cogniard brothers, La cocarde tricolore - épisode de la guerre d'Alger, seen at the old Folies-Dramatiques on 19 March 1831. Traubner describes the opera as "a militaristic, patriotic affair with Algerian scenes". It was first performed at the Théâtre des Folies-Dramatiques on 17 November 1885 and ran for 150 performances.

== Roles ==
Role	Voice type	Premiere Cast, 17 November 1885 (Conductor: Thibault)
Saint-Angénor	tenor	Gobin
Joseph Abrial	tenor	Simon-Max
Pierre Aubertin	baritone	Jourdan
Ben Ahmed	bass	Chauvereau
Trécourt	bass	Riga
Gransac		Duhamel
Bou Maleck		Valdor
Sélim		Van de Gend
Thérèse	soprano	Juliette Simon-Girard
Zélie	soprano	Vialda
Ali		Savary
Tarata		Hicks
Rosette		Weil
Conscripts, zouaves, Arabs, grisettes, and workers.

== Synopsis ==
=== Act 1 ===
Act 1 takes place in Paris in 1840 near the Rotunda of the Temple, with the flower-shop and a wine-shop in view.
Pierre Aubertin is the fiancé of Thérèse – the pretty flower-girl, called the 'la fauvette du temple' – and Joseph Abrial, is betrothed to his love Zélie. Thérèse is overheard singing by the former star singer turned teacher Saint-Angénor, who is determined to make her his pupil – he says to make her fortune, but also so that he can prove the value of his singing method. Pierre and Joseph are called up and obliged to depart as soldiers for seven years. Saint-Angénor agrees to a demand from Thérèse, that, in return for becoming his pupil, he will give 2,000 francs to buy out Pierre from his military service. But Pierre, suspicious of the professor, refuses to take the money and leaves for Africa, while Saint-Angénor plans to go to Italy with his new pupil and her 'maid' Zélie.

=== Act 2 ===
Act 2 is set near an oasis in Algeria, two years later.
After a scene in which Joseph expresses his boredom with army life and Lieutenant Pierre leads off the zouaves, an attachment of Arabs led by Bou Maleck emerge from the rocks. Ben-Ahmed and his men prepare a massive bomb of gunpowder for the Frenchmen when they return, and leave. Now Ali ushers in Angénor with Thérèse and Zélie. Thérèse has come to north Africa with her friend and Saint-Angénor in search of Pierre, with whom she is still in love. Ben-Ahmed, enamoured of Thérèse, returns and despatches Saint-Angénor to teach singing to his harem. Now Pierre and Joseph return and demand to know the whereabouts of a singer, 'Frasquita' (Thérèse’s stage name), who gave a concert the previous day and was arrested along with her manager. Ben-Ahmed refuses and condemns the two Frenchmen to death. Joseph takes the disguise of a mute guard, sabotages the Arabs' arms and sounds the alarm to his comrades. The fauvette, Angénor and Zélie have been taken away by Ali, so the Frenchmen head off for Mascara.

=== Act 3 ===
The last act, set in a square in Mascara, opens with Arabs citizens fleeing the invading French soldiers. After Pierre has lamented his loss of Thérèse, Saint-Angénor enters disguised as an Arab. After explaining to Trécourt who he is, and where the Fauvette is, Joseph enters and is soon re-united with Zélie who has been expelled from the harem. Soon too Thérèse appears with Ben-Ahmed but is rescued by the French, and all ends well.
