= Henri Rollan =

French actor

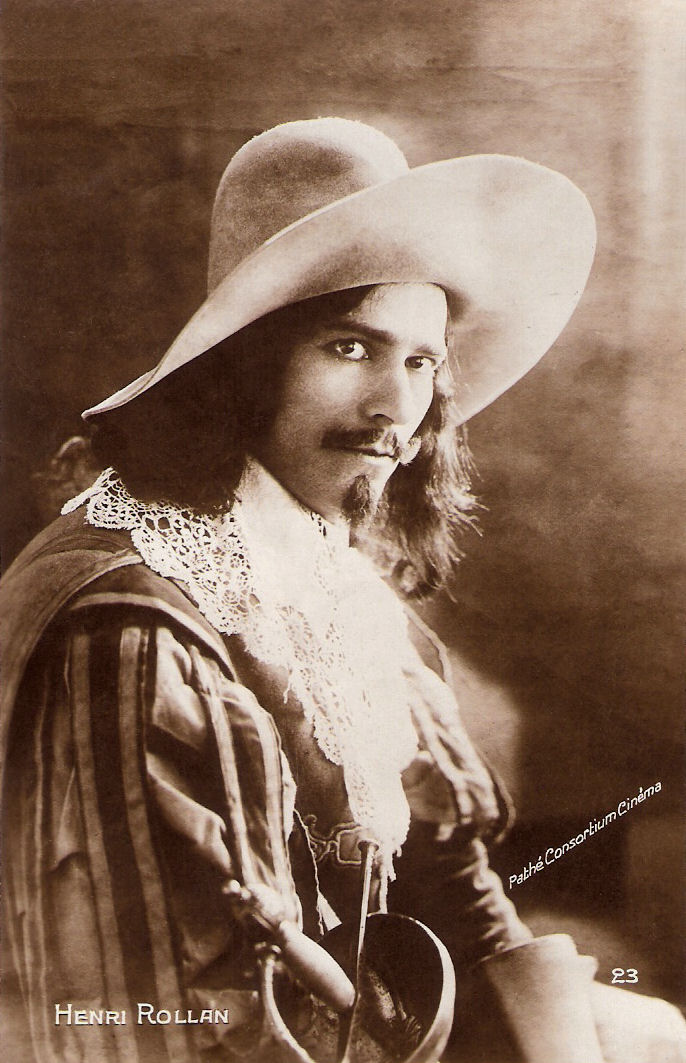
- Rollan in Les Trois Mousquetaires
- Born: 23 March 1888; Paris, France
- Died: 23 June 1967 (aged 79); Paris, France
- Occupation: Film actor
- Years active: 1910–1962

Henri Rollan (23 March 1888 – 23 June 1967) was a French film actor. He appeared in more than 40 films between 1910 and 1962.

== Selected filmography ==
- De afwezige (1913)
- Les Trois Mousquetaires (1921)
- The Three Masks (1921)
- Paris Qui Dort (1925)
- Alone (1931)
- Moonlight (1932)
- The Three Musketeers (1932)
- The Ironmaster (1933)
- Miquette (1934)
- The Scandal (1934)
- Primerose (1934)
- The Adventurer (1934)
- Bux the Clown (1935)
- The Mysteries of Paris (1935)
- La Garçonne (1936)
- The Phantom Gondola (1936)
- Temptation (1936)
- The Dark Angels (1937)
- Giuseppe Verdi (1938)
- Troubled Heart (1938)
- Shot in the Night (1943)
- The New Masters (1950)
- Les joueurs (1951)
- Bluebeard (1951)
- The Case of Doctor Galloy (1951)
- Fanfan la Tulipe (1952)
- The Lovers of Marianne (1953)
- The Adventures of Arsène Lupin (1957)
