= Maurice Desfassiaux =

French cinematographer

- Born: 1 February 1886; Paris, France
- Died: 22 December 1956 (aged 70); Deuil-la-Barre, Val-d'Oise, France
- Other name: Henri Maurice Desfassiaux
- Occupation: Cinematographer
- Years active: 1913–1940 (film )

Maurice Desfassiaux (1886–1956) was a French cinematographer.

== Biography ==
The Parisian native learned his craft from the ground up at the Pathé production company and began his career as a camera assistant. He quickly rose to the position of chief cameraman and, in this role, was already shooting short silent films before the First World War, mostly productions by the film pioneer Henri Andréani. The outbreak of war in 1914 interrupted his work, and he was drafted.

== Selected filmography ==
- The Three Musketeers (1921)
- I Have Killed (1924)
- The Crazy Ray (1925)
- Carmen (1926)
- The Porter from Maxim's (1927)
- The Italian Straw Hat (1928)
- Cagliostro (1929)
- Paris by Night (1930)
- My Aunt from Honfleur (1931)
- The Three Musketeers (1932)
- Moonlight (1932)
- Miquette (1934)
- A Foolish Maiden (1938)

== Bibliography ==
- Powrie, Phil & Rebillard, Éric. Pierre Batcheff and stardom in 1920s French cinema. Edinburgh University Press, 2009.
