= Moonlight (1932 film) =

1932 French comedy film by Henri Diamant-Berger

- Directed by: Henri Diamant-Berger
- Written by: Blanche Oelrichs; Henri Diamant-Berger
- Produced by: Henri Diamant-Berger
- Starring: Blanche Montel; Claude Dauphin; Henri Rollan
- Cinematography: Maurice Desfassiaux
- Music by: Jean Lenoir
- Production company: Les Films Diamant
- Distributed by: Compagnie Universelle Cinématographique
- Release date: 14 November 1932
- Running time: 77 minutes
- Country: France
- Language: French

Moonlight (French: Clair de lune) is a 1932 French comedy film directed by Henri Diamant-Berger and starring Blanche Montel, Claude Dauphin and Henri Rollan. The film was shot on location around Cannes.

== Synopsis ==
While sailing on a yacht off the French Riviera a shy young man and the owner's daughter are shipwrecked on an island.

== Cast ==
- Blanche Montel as Lucie
- Claude Dauphin as Jacques
- Henri Rollan as Le philosophe
- Jean Joffre as Ernest
- Yvonne Rozille as Berthe Lydiane
- Jeanne Cheirel as La baronne Jeanne de Bonasette
- Lulu Vattier as Noémie
- Andrée Lorraine as Andrée
- Georges Térof as Un marin

== Bibliography ==
- Oscherwitz, Dayna & Higgins, MaryEllen. The A to Z of French Cinema. Scarecrow Press, 2009.
