= Yvonne Rozille =

French film actress

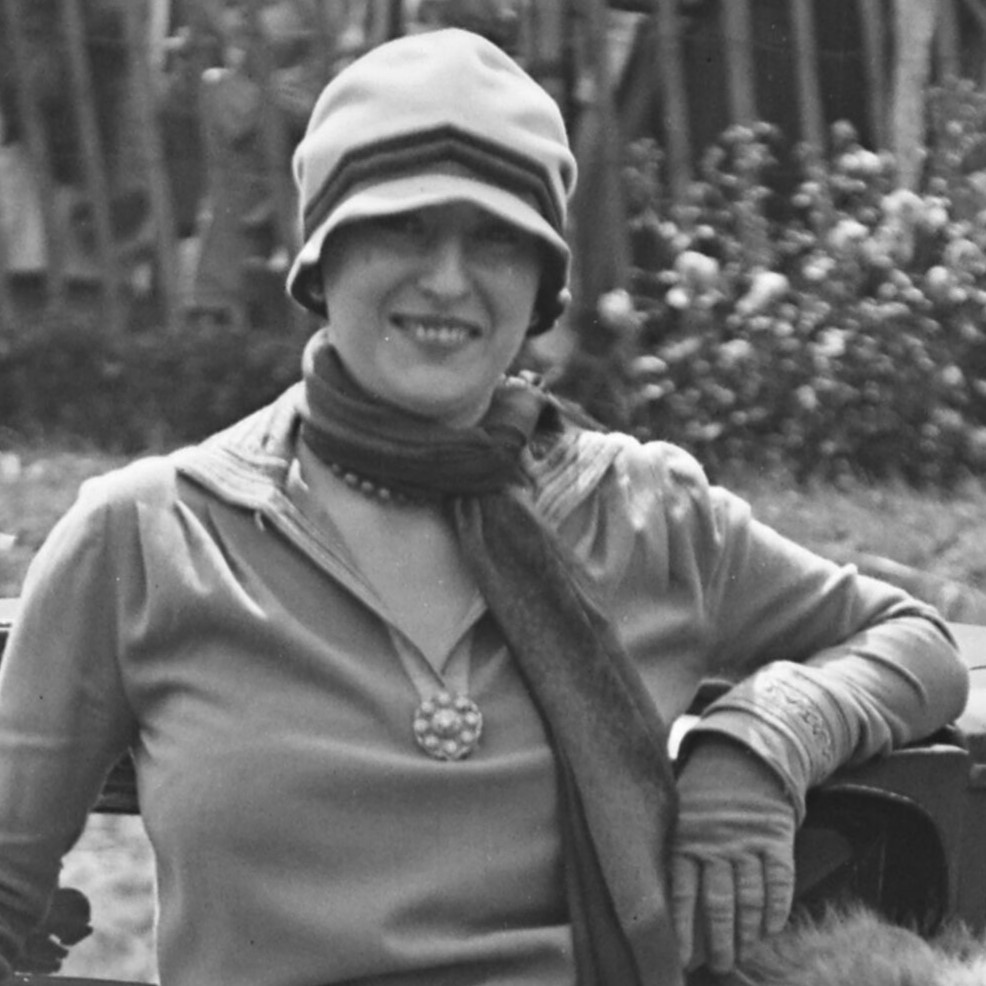
French operetta singer, stage actress and film actress Yvonne Rozille in 1927

Yvonne Rozille, née Marie-Yvonne Gilberte Rouzille (5 January 1900, Commentry – 1 December 1985, Grasse) was a French film actress.

In 1937, she married Georges Gaillard, honorary prefect and codirector of the Théâtre du Vaudeville, founder of the Revue de Hollande.

== Filmography ==
- 1931: Ma tante d'Honfleur by André Gillois
- 1931: Mariage d'amour by Henri Diamant-Berger (short film)
- 1932: Moonlight by Henri Diamant-Berger : Berthe Lydiane
- 1935: The Happy Road by Georges Lacombe : Tante Anna
- 1935: L'École des vierges by Pierre Weill
- 1935: Le Train d'amour by Pierre Weill
- 1935: La Coqueluche de ces dames by Gabriel Rosca
- 1936: Tout va très bien madame la marquise by Henry Wulschleger
- 1936: La Madone de l'Atlantique by Pierre Weill
- 1937: Un soir à Marseille by Maurice de Canonge
- 1937: Arsène Lupin détective by Henri Diamant-Berger
- 1937: La Fessée by Pierre Caron : Princesse Henriette
- 1938: L'Avion de minuit by Dimitri Kirsanoff
- 1939: Le Moulin dans le soleil by Marc Didier
- 1939: Face au destin by Henri Fescourt
- 1939: Louise by Abel Gance : Une cliente
- 1939: The Spirit of Sidi-Brahim by Marc Didier
- 1945: Mensonges by Jean Stelli : Madame Dumontel
- 1949: Manèges by Yves Allégret
- 1963: Let's Rob the Bank by Jean Girault

== Bibliography ==
- Jean Méry, « Yvonne Rozille », Cinémonde, n° 374, 19 December 1935, p. 958
