= Caroline Girard =

French opera singer

Caroline Girard (French pronunciation: [kaʁɔlin ʒiʁaʁ]; 7 April 1830) was a French operatic Mezzo-soprano. She was the mother of Juliette Simon-Girard.

== Career ==
Girard was born in Paris and studied at the Paris Conservatory.

She became a principal singer at the Théâtre Lyrique in Paris in 1853, creating many roles including Margot in Le diable à quatre by Solié/Adam in 1853, Columbine in Le tableau parlant by Grétry in 1854, Nancy/Aenchen in Robin des Bois by Weber in 1855, Pétronille in Le sourd ou l'auberge pleine by Adam in 1856, Antonio in Richard Coeur-de-lion by Grétry in 1856, Fatime in Oberon by Weber in 1857, Barbarina in Les noces de Figaro in 1858, Florette in Les rosières by Hérold in 1860 and Papillon/Despina in Peines d'amours perdues by Mozart/Shakespeare in 1863.

Moving in 1863 to the Opéra-Comique, where she was described as a 'dugazon', she made her debut there as Lucette in La fausse magie on 16 July 1863. She took part in the premieres of Les Bourguignonnes in 1863, Sylvie (1864) in the title role, Les absents (1864), Fils du brigadier (1867) as l'hôtelière Catellna, La grand'tante (1867) as La Chevrette, Robinson Crusoé (1867) as Suzanne, and La fille du tambour-major (1879) as the Duchesse Della Volta (where she also appeared with her daughter and son-in-law). At the Bouffes Parisiens she created the role of Léona in Maître Péronilla in 1878.

Her other roles at the Salle Favart included Nicette in Le Pré aux clercs, Suzette in Marie, Mazet in La Colombe, Babel in le Nouveau Seigneur du village, Madeleine in Le postillon de Lonjumeau, and in 1868 she recreated the role of Georgette in Les dragons de Villars.

On 24 August 1863, she sang in the cantata Après la victoire by Lefébure-Wély at the Opéra-Comique.

== Roles created at Théâtre Lyrique ==
- Lisbeth in La fille invisible by Boieldieu, 1854
- Simonette in La promise by Clapisson, 1854
- Olivette in Schahabaham II by Gautier in 1854
- Christine in Le roman de la rose by Pascal in 1854
- Ines in Une nuit à Séville by Barbier in 1855
- Don Luiz in Les lavandières de Santarem by Gevaert in 1855
- Georgette in Les dragons de Villars by Maillart in 1856
- Inésille in Les nuits d’Espagne by Semet in 1857
- Nanette in Margot by Clapisson in 1857
- Jacqueline in Le médecin malgré lui by Gounod in 1858
- Myrtille in L’agneau de Chloe by Montaubry in 1858
- Lulli, (breeches role) in Les petits violons du roi by Louis Deffès in 1859
- Laure in Gil Blas by Semet in 1860
- Le Baron de Gonesse/Louis XV in Le café du roi by Deffès in 1861
- Title role in L’ondine by Semet in 1863
