= La fille du tambour-major =

Opéra comique by Jacques Offenbach

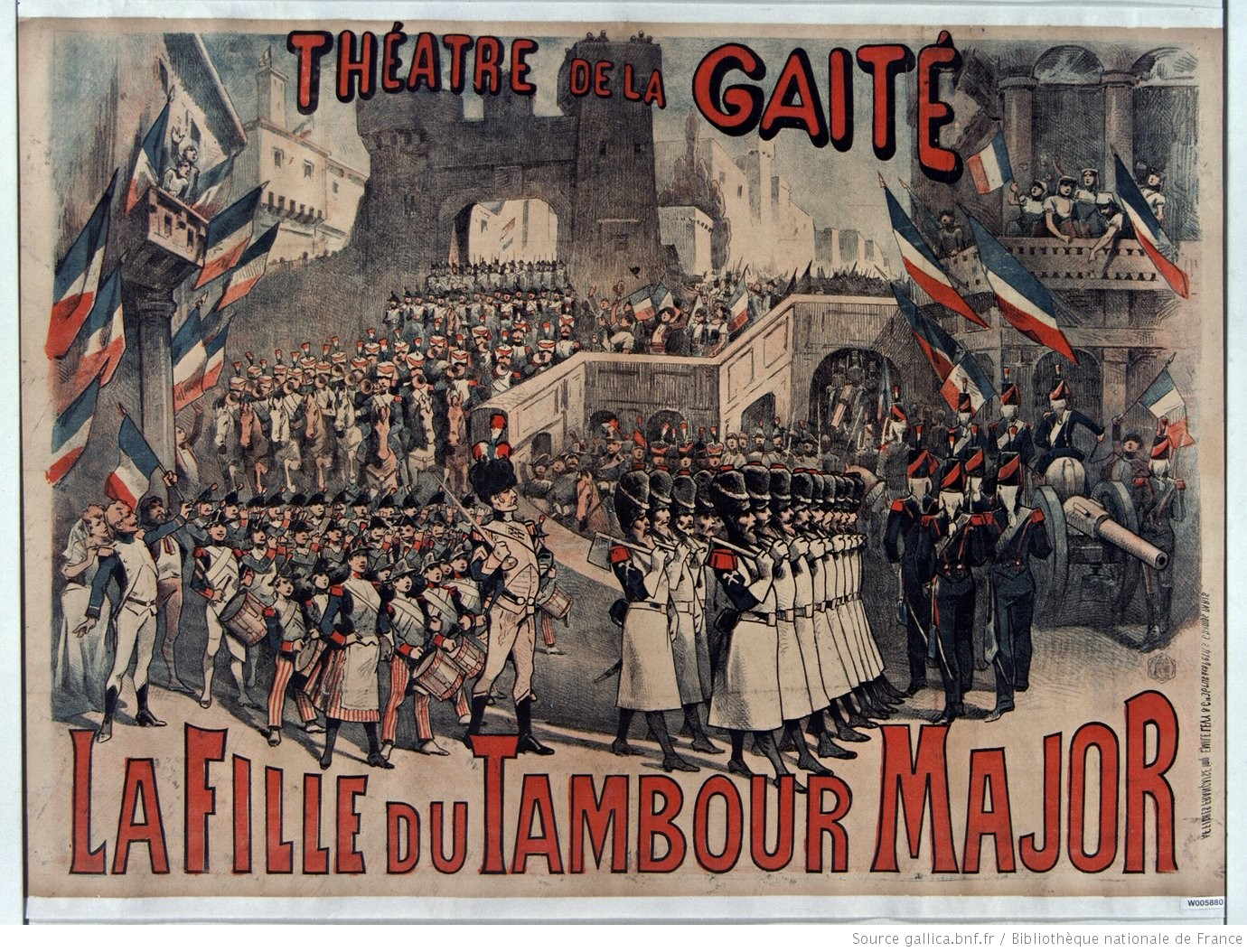
Poster for 1889 revival

La fille du tambour-major (French pronunciation: [la fij dy tɑ̃buʁ maʒɔʁ], The Drum Major's Daughter) is an opéra comique in three acts, with music by Jacques Offenbach and words by Alfred Duru and Henri Chivot. It was one of the composer's last works, premiered less than a year before his death. It opened at the Théâtre des Folies-Dramatiques, Paris, on 13 December 1879, and, after a successful initial run, was frequently revived in Paris and internationally, but in recent times has not been among the Offenbach operas most frequently staged.

The plot, which has elements in common with Gaetano Donizetti's 1840 comic opera La fille du régiment, depicts a young woman discovering her real identity, renouncing her aristocratic upbringing, and marrying a dashing soldier.

== Background and first performance ==
After immense success in the 1860s, Offenbach suffered a brief period of unpopularity with the Parisian public in the early 1870s for his association with the fallen Second Empire. His position as the pre-emininent composer of operetta was threatened by the rise of Charles Lecocq, but by the later years of the 1870s he had recovered his popularity. Madame Favart (1878) had run for more than 200 performances at the Théâtre des Folies-Dramatiques: a run of half that length was reckoned a success in the Parisian theatres of the time. The writers Alfred Duru and Henri Chivot were established authors of librettos for comic operas, having collaborated with Lecocq, Léon Vasseur, Edmond Audran and, in 1868, Offenbach (L'île de Tulipatan). To follow Madame Favart the three wrote La fille du tambour-major for the Folies-Dramatiques and its company, which starred Parisian favourites including Juliette Simon-Girard, Caroline Girard and Simon-Max. The story of the new work was regarded as a variation on Gaetano Donizetti's La fille du régiment (1840). In the earlier work the heroine, who has been brought up by an army regiment, is in reality, the daughter of a marchioness; in Duru and Chivot's version, the heroine's mother is a duchesse, and her father is drum major of an army demi-brigade.

The opera was first staged at the Folies-Dramatiques on 13 December 1879. It was billed as the composer's 100th work. (Note: In his 1981 biography of Offenbach, Alexander Faris comments, "It depends how you count". In his list of the composer's works there are several operas that were so extensively revised for revivals as to count as new works.) It received a standing ovation, and was the last of his premieres that he lived to attend. The piece was very successful, running for over 240 performances, taking more than 600,000 francs at the box office, (Note: Equivalent to approximately €2,751,138 in modern terms.) and was still playing when the composer died in October 1880.

== Roles ==
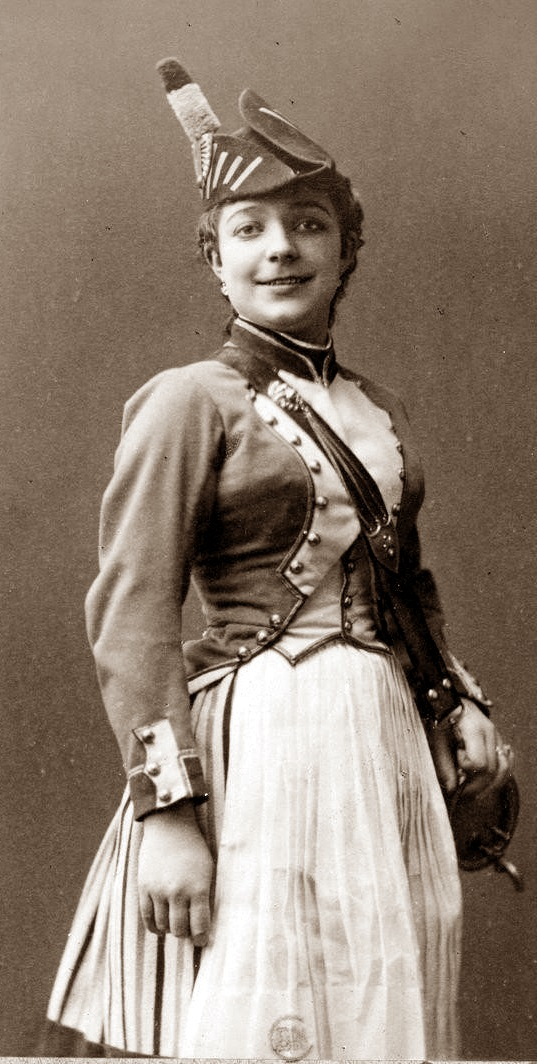
Juliette Simon-Girard as Stella

| Role | Voice type | Premiere Cast, December 13, 1879 (Conductor: - ) |
|---|---|---|
| Stella, putative daughter of the Della Voltas | soprano | Juliette Simon-Girard |
| Duc Della Volta | tenor | Édouard Maugé |
| Duchesse Della Volta | mezzo-soprano | Caroline Girard |
| Robert, a lieutenant | baritone | Lepers |
| Monthabor, a drum-major | bass | François-Louis Luco |
| Griolet, a drummer | tenor | Simon-Max |
| Claudine, regimental vivandière | soprano | Noémie Vernon |
| Mother Superior | soprano | Hélène Réval |
| Marquis Bambini | tenor | Bartel |
| Clampas | baritone | Henriot |
| Francesca | soprano | Listrelle |
Soldiers, Nuns, Convent inmates, Gentlemen and Ladies, People

== Synopsis ==
The opera is set in northern Italy at the beginning of the 19th century.

=== Act I ===
==== The garden of a convent school in the town of Biella. ====
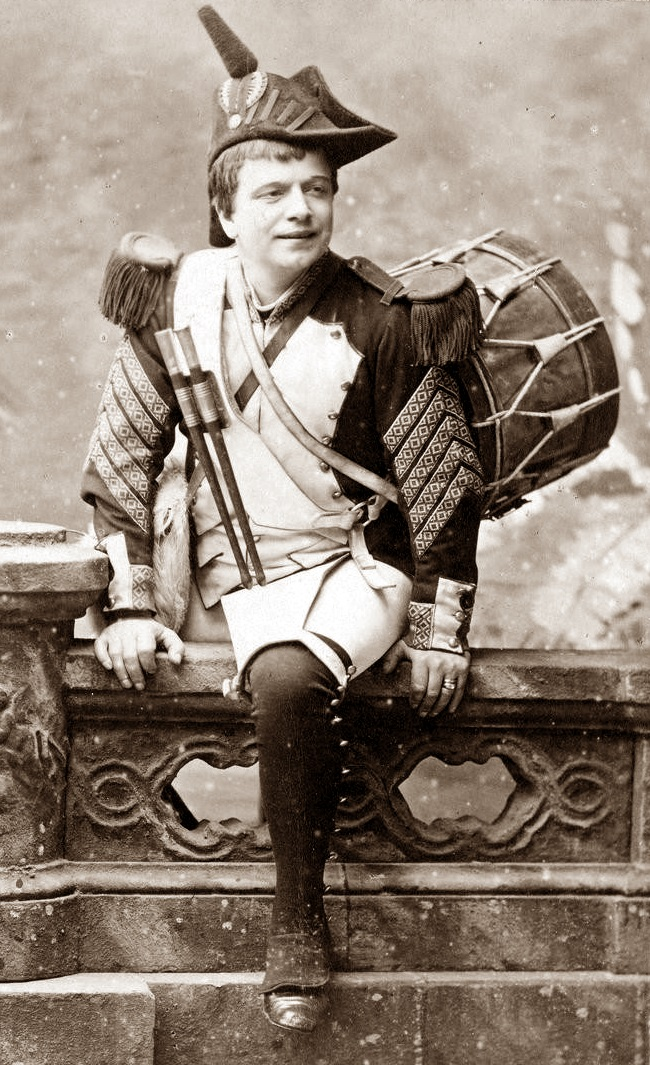
Simon-Max as Griolet

The convent is in a war zone, as the revolutionary French army and the occupying Austrians fight for possession of the territory. As the French forces advance, the Mother Superior of the convent moves her pupils to safety in a more secure buildings, forgetting that one pupil, Stella, has been left behind, locked up in the linen cupboard as a punishment for singing a seditious, anti-Austrian, pro-French song. The French troops arrive, led by Lieutenant Robert; among their number are the drummer, Griolet, and the drum major, Monthabor. The men are tired, hungry and thirsty. Their vivandière, Claudine, cannot help them, as her supplies of food and drink have run out. The soldiers raid the convent's stores, and in doing so they find Stella. She is rather frightened at first, but the charm of the dashing Lieutenant Robert reassures her, and she offers to prepare a meal for them all.

The obvious mutual attraction of Robert and Stella annoys Claudine, who is much attracted to the lieutenant. She, in turn, is oblivious to the devotion of the ex-tailor Griolet, who tries in vain to engage her interest. The genial Monthabor is unimpressed with all talk of romance and marriage. He tells his comrades that in civilian life, when he was a dyer in Paris, he met a pretty washerwoman, and married her – a grave mistake as she was impossible to live with and they divorced a few years later. She vanished, taking their only child, a daughter, with her. The soldiers eat the excellent meal Stella has made for them, and march on, somewhat reluctantly on Robert's part, as he is loth to leave Stella. Once the French have left, the Duc della Volta and the effete Marquis Ernesto Bambini enter. The marquis has a financial hold over the duc, who is accordingly willing to allow Bambini to marry Stella. Suddenly the garden fills with people. The Mother Superior and her girls have been unable to reach their intended sanctuary and return, surrounded by the French soldiers. The duc is scandalised when he learns that Stella has been left alone with a detachment of enemy troops, but she firmly defends their conduct towards her. The duc angrily hustles her away.

=== Act II ===
==== The ducal palace in Novara ====
Costume designs, 1879: Claudine (top) and Robert and the duc (below)

While Stella continues to refuse to marry Bambini, the duc and duchesse attempt to persuade her and to keep Bambini happy. The French army has continued its advance and has arrived at Novara. Robert, Monthabor and Griolet take temporary residence in the palace, as does Claudine, determined to keep an eye on Robert, under the same roof as Stella. While this is going on, the duc's guests begin arriving for a ball intended to mark Stella's wedding. The party is interrupted by Monthabor, who comes to protest at being lodged in the attic. He comes face to face with the duchesse: they are both thunderstruck. She is his ex-wife and the mother of his daughter. The duchesse hastily orders that the Frenchmen are to be given the best rooms in the house, and she denies to Monthabor that Stella is his long-lost child. Stella finds herself alone with Robert. The two young people are quick to admit their mutual love. Monthabor is not satisfied with the explanations of his ex-wife. He questions Stella about her childhood and soon realises that she truly is his daughter. Stella changes into a new vivandiere uniform (made by Griolet and intended for Claudine) and announces to the assembled guests that she is French and the daughter of the drum-major. She has decided to follow her real father, but at this point the Austrian army, counter-attacking, invades the palace, and the act ends with a battle.

=== Act III ===
==== Scene 1: The Golden Lion inn, Milan ====
Claudine and Robert have been separated from their comrades during the skirmish, and they take refuge at an inn run by her uncle, a strongly pro-French activist, who distributes French tricolore flags to his customers. The duc and Bambini arrive in pursuit, assuming Robert has Stella with him. Stella arrives with Griolet and Monthabor: the three are convincingly disguised as, respectively, a little English coachman, a young Italian lord, and a Capuchin friar. Robert is recognised and arrested. The duc agrees to have him released on condition that Stella marries Bambini.

==== Scene 2: A square in Milan ====
The bridal procession enters. The bridal veil conceals the fact the Claudine has secretly taken Stella's place, to thwart the duc's plans. Robert, who does not know of the substitution, intervenes to prevent the sacrifice of the one he loves, and the subterfuge is discovered. The duc, furious, orders everyone arrested but, as the police lead Robert and Claudine away, martial music is heard. The main French army has entered Milan. Soldiers pour into the square and the jubilant people wave French flags. The duc prudently has a complete change of loyalties. Robert is freed to go to his Stella and Claudine gives the faithful Griolet her hand and heart, and a double wedding can take place.

Source: Gänzl's Book of the Musical Theatre.

== Numbers ==
Act I

- Overture
- Choeur des pensionnaires "Reçois sainte madone", Chanson du fruit défendu "Prenez les grappes empourprées" – Chorus of the boarders "Receive holy Madonna", Song of forbidden fruit "Pick the red clusters" – Stella
- Choeur et couplets "Par une chaleur si forte" – Chorus and couplets "With so much heat" – Robert, Griolet, Monthabor, chorus
- Couplets de l'âne "Ce n'est pas un âne ordinaire" – Couplets of the donkey "This is not an ordinary donkey" – Claudine, all
- Ensemble "De grâce, ayez pitié de moi" – Ensemble "Please, have mercy on me" – Stella, Robert, soldiers
- Couplets du tailleur "Tout en tirant mon aiguille" – Tailor's couplets "While pulling my needle" – Griolet
- Choeur "Puisque le couvert est mis", Couplets "Depuis longtemps l'Italie… Petit Français, brave Français – Chorus "Because the table is set", Couplets "For a long time Italy ... Little Frenchman, brave Frenchman – Stella
- Légende "Il était une grand princess" – Legend "There was a great princess" – Claudine, Griolet
- Final I: Ensemble "Messieurs, les militaires", Couplets "Pour recevoir un régiment" Final "Allons, dépêchons et partons" – Finale I: Ensemble "Gentlemen, the military", Couplets "To receive a regiment", Finale "Come, hurry and leave" – Stella, all

Act II

- Entr'acte
- Couplets "Examinez ma figure" – Couplets "Examine my face" – the Duchess
- Rondeau " Ah ! vraiment je le déclare" – Rondeau "Ah! I really declare it " – Stella
- Quatuor du billet de logement "C'est un billet de logement" – Quartet of the billetting notice "It is a billet of lodging" – Robert, the Duke, Monthabor, Griolet
- Couplets " Eh bien ! en voilà des manières" – Couplets "Well! There are ways " – Claudine
- Ensemble et valse "Dansons et valsons" – Ensemble and waltz "Dansons et valsons" – Chorus, the Duke, Monthabor, the Duchess
- Duo "Tenez, j'aurai de la franchise" – Duet "Here, I'll have frankness" – Stella, Robert
- Couplets de l'uniforme "le voilà, ce bel uniforme" – Couplets of the uniform "Here it is, this beautiful uniform" – Griolet
- Final II: Choeur "Par devant monsieur le notaire", Chanson de la fille du Tambour Major "Que m'importe un titre éclatant" Final – Finale II: Chorus "In front of Monsieur le Notaire", Song of the Drum Major's daughter "What do I care for a brilliant title" Finale – Stella

Act III

- Entr'acte
- Choeur et scène "Chut, il faut de la prudence" (Claudine, Robert Clampin), Tarentelle "Nous étions à Novare" – Chorus and scene "Hush, we must be cautious" (Claudine, Robert Clampin), Tarantella "We were in Novara" – Robert, Claudine, choir
- Gigue "Je suis le p'tit cocher" – Gigue "I'm the little coachman" – Stella, all
- Quatuor "Oui, ce sont vos amis" (Stella, Griolet, Robert, – Quartet "Yes, they are your friends" – Stella, Griolet, Robert, Monthabor
- Duo de la confession "L'autre jour, contre toute attente" – Duet of confession "The other day, against all odds" – Monthabor, the Duchess
- Final III: Choeur nuptial "Un mariag' s'apprête", ensemble, "Ecoutez, c'est le chant du départ" et final " La fille du tambour-major" – Finale III: Bridal Chorus "A Husband Is Getting Ready", Together, "Listen, It's the Song of Departure" and Finale "The Drum Major's Daughter" – all

Source: Vocal score.

== Critical reception ==
The opera was generally well received. The critic Félix Clément was tepid, writing of unoriginal music and short-breathed phrases, but he found numbers to praise, specifically Stella's song of the forbidden fruit, Claudine's song of the donkey, Griolet's sewing song and several of the dance numbers. Edouard Noël and Edmond Stoullig, in Les annales du théâtre et de la musique, praised the work highly, and said it deserved a long run. Among modern critics, Richard Traubner writes of "so exciting, so thrilling a score, set to an amusing libretto". The authors of The Penguin Guide to Recorded Classical Music write that the piece "fizzes with good tunes", has one of the composer's best waltz-tunes, a dashing tarantella, and an abundance of good character numbers.

== Revivals ==
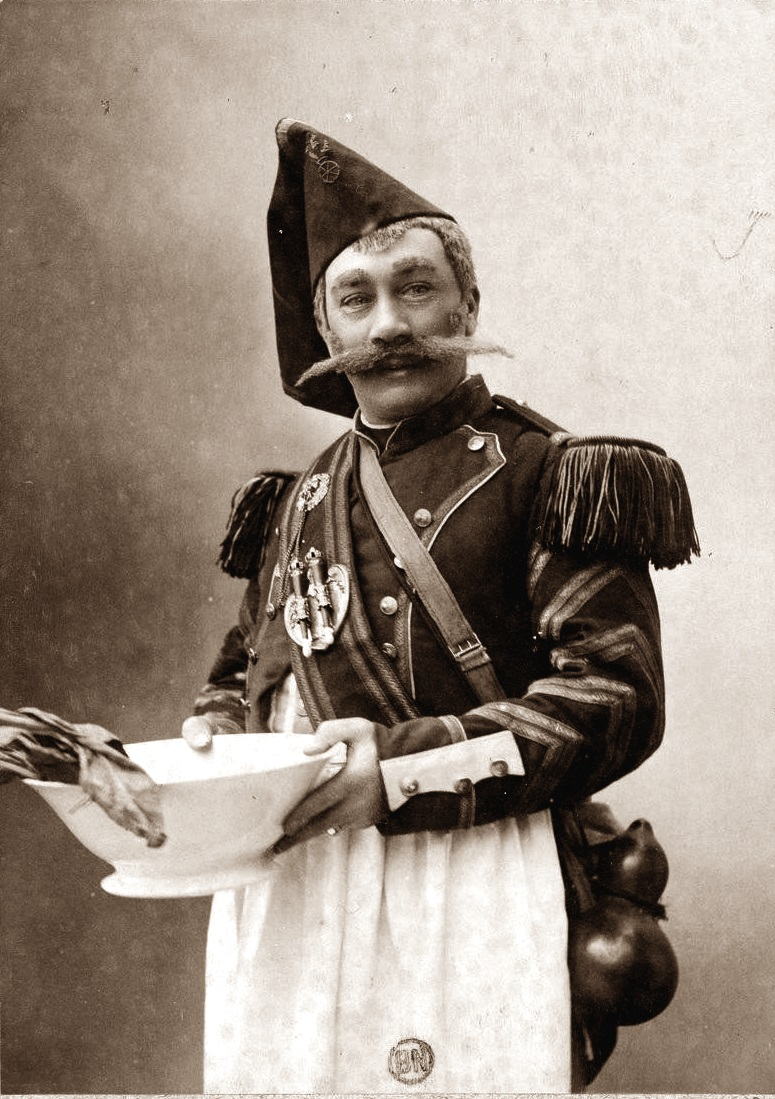
Eugène Vauthier as Monthabor in the 1889 revival at the Gaîté

In Paris there were revivals at the Folies-Dramatiques (1884), the Théâtre de la Gaîté (1889, 1891 and 1913), the Théâtre du Château d’Eau (1901), the Gaîté-Lyrique (1920 and 1945. The first Gaîté production surpassed the box-office success of the 1879 run, earning nearly a million francs. (Note: €4,840,571 in modern terms.)

In April 1880 productions opened at the Theater an der Wien in Vienna and the Alhambra Theatre, London. The latter, in an English version by H. B. Farnie, starred Constance Loseby and Fred Leslie, with the role of Griolet played en travesti by Fannie Leslie. The production ran there until January 1881, when it transferred to the Connaught Theatre, with a different cast. The work was given in French at the Shaftesbury Theatre, London, in 1908.

A New York production, sung in French by Maurice Grau's company, opened at the Standard Theatre in September 1880. Farnie's English version, starring Selina Dolaro, opened at the 14th Street Theatre the following month. Dolaro later toured the US in the piece. Under the title The Drum Major another English version played at the Casino Theatre in 1889, starring Pauline Hall. An Australian production opened in June 1881, and In Berlin the opera was given at the Walhalla Theater in September 1883.

In more recent times, the work has been presented by the Odéon, Marseille (May 2018), but has not been among Offenbach's more frequently revived operas.

== Recordings ==
- Recordings on operadis-opera-discography.org.uk

== See also ==
- Libretto in WikiSource

== Notes, references and sources ==
=== Sources ===
- Faris, Alexander (1980). Jacques Offenbach. London: Faber & Faber. ISBN 978-0-571-11147-3.
- Gänzl, Kurt; Andrew Lamb (1988). Gänzl's Book of the Musical Theatre. London: The Bodley Head. OCLC 966051934.
- March, Ivan; Edward Greenfield; Robert Layton; Paul Czajkowski (2009). The Penguin Guide to Recorded Classical music 2010. London: Penguin. ISBN 978-0-14-104162-9.
- Noël, Édouard; Edmond Stoullig (1880). Les annales du théatre et de la musique, 1879. Paris: Charpentier. OCLC 1024149992.
- Offenbach, Jacques (1879). La fille du tambour-major. Paris: Choudens. OCLC 1047467783.
- Traubner, Richard (2016). Operetta: A Theatrical History. London: Routledge. ISBN 978-1-138-13892-6.
