= Charles Gabet =

French playwright and librettist

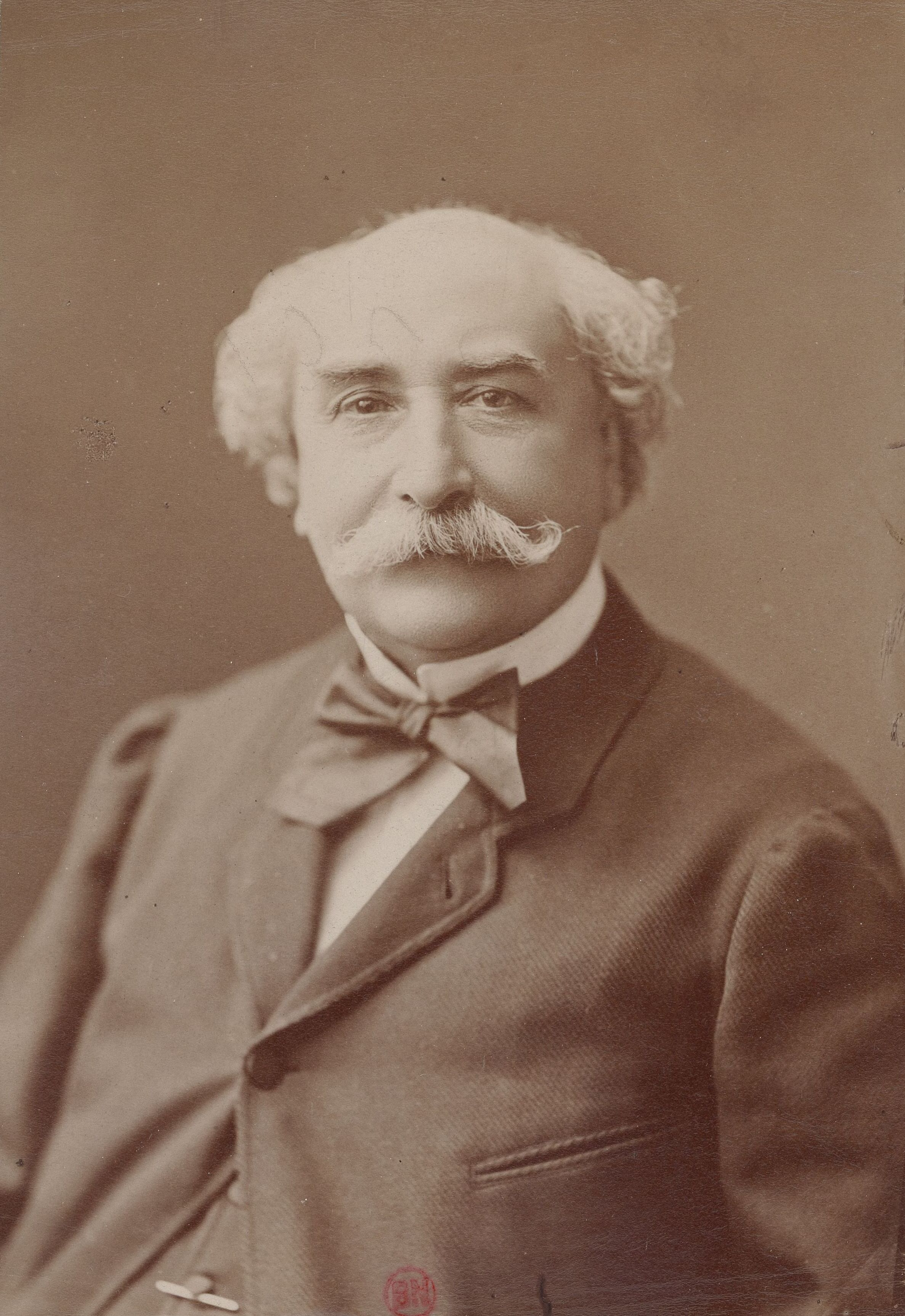
Gabet by Nadar

Émile Étienne Charles Gabet (16 May 1821 in Paris – 15 January 1903) was a 19th-century French playwright and librettist.

== Biography ==
Gabet was the son of the painter Charles Gabet and his wife Françoise Ursine Eugénie Viquesnel.

He led parallel careers as a commissaire de police and a dramatist. He was commissaire de police of the Porte-Saint-Martin quartier (that of théâtres of the boulevards Saint-Martin and Strasbourg). As a playwright and librettist, he worked with several major authors of his time: Alexandre Dumas, Clairville and Adolphe d'Ennery. He also parodied Victor Hugo with a malicious Ruy-Black, lampooning Ruy Blas.

He died at the age of 81 in 1903 in his home at 89 rue du Faubourg-Saint-Martin in Paris.

== Works ==
- 1848: Le Socialisme, à-propos burlesque mêlé de couplets, Spectacle-Concert (24 December)
- 1853: Un pacha dérangé, one-act vaudeville, in collaboration with Amédée de Jallais, Théâtre des Délassements-Comiques (25 August)
- 1854: Un système conjugal, one-act comédie en vaudeville, in collaboration with Adolphe d'Ennery
- 1854: Allez-vous-en, gens de la noce, pochade in 1 act mingled with couplets, in collaboration with A. de Jallais, Théâtre du Vaudeville (14 October)
- 1855: Le Palais de Chrysocale, ou les Exposants et les exposés, contre-exposition de l'Exposition, mêlée de couplets, in collaboration with Clairville, Théâtre des Variétés (23 July)
- 1857: Les Compagnons de Jéhu, drama in 5 acts and 15 tableaux from the novel by Alexandre Dumas, set in music by Fossey, Théâtre de la Gaîté (2 July).
- 1858: Cœur qui soupire…, one-act operetta, set in music by Fossey, Théâtre de la Gaîté (12 June)
- 1858: La bouteille à l'encre, féérie in 3 acts and 20 tableaux, Théâtre des Délassements-Comiques (4 September)
- 1859: La Femme de Valentino, one-act vaudeville, Théâtre des Délassements-Comiques (22 February)
- 1859: La Conquête de la paix, hymne patriotique
- 1862: Le Mérite des femmes, one-act comédie en vaudeville, Théâtre des Délassements-Comiques (5 November)
- 1869: Une nourrice sur lieu, one-act comédie en vaudeville, Théâtre de l'Ambigu (15 March)
- 1872: Les Griffes du Diable, pièce fantastique in 3 acts and 12 tableaux, imitated from Sedaine, in collaboration with Clairville, Théâtre des Menus Plaisirs (18 April)
- 1872: Ruy-Black, ou les Noirceurs de l'amour, parody in 1 act and 2 tableaux, in verse and in prose, Théâtre des Folies Bergère (20 April)
- 1873: Coupe de cheveux à 50centimes, esquisse de la vie parisienne in 1 act, Théâtre de la Renaissance (30 May)
- 1873: Le Pantalon de Casimir, one-act operetta, set in music by J. de Billemont, Concert de l'Eldorado (31 May)
- 1873: Le Trésor des dames, one-act play, Théâtre des Folies-Dramatiques (8 August)
- 1874: Le Nouvel Achille, one-act play, Théâtre des Folies-Dramatiques (25 June)
- 1876: Les Billets doux, one-act comedy, Théâtre des Folies-Dramatiques (26 August)
- 1877: Les Cloches de Corneville, opéra comique in 3 acts and 4 tableaux and one ballet, in collaboration with Clairville and set in music by Robert Planquette, Théâtre des Folies-Dramatiques (19 April)
- 1880: L'Avocat des maris, one-act comedy, Théâtre des Bouffes-Parisiens (12 January)
- 1895: Vendredi 13
