= Simon-Max =

French opera singer

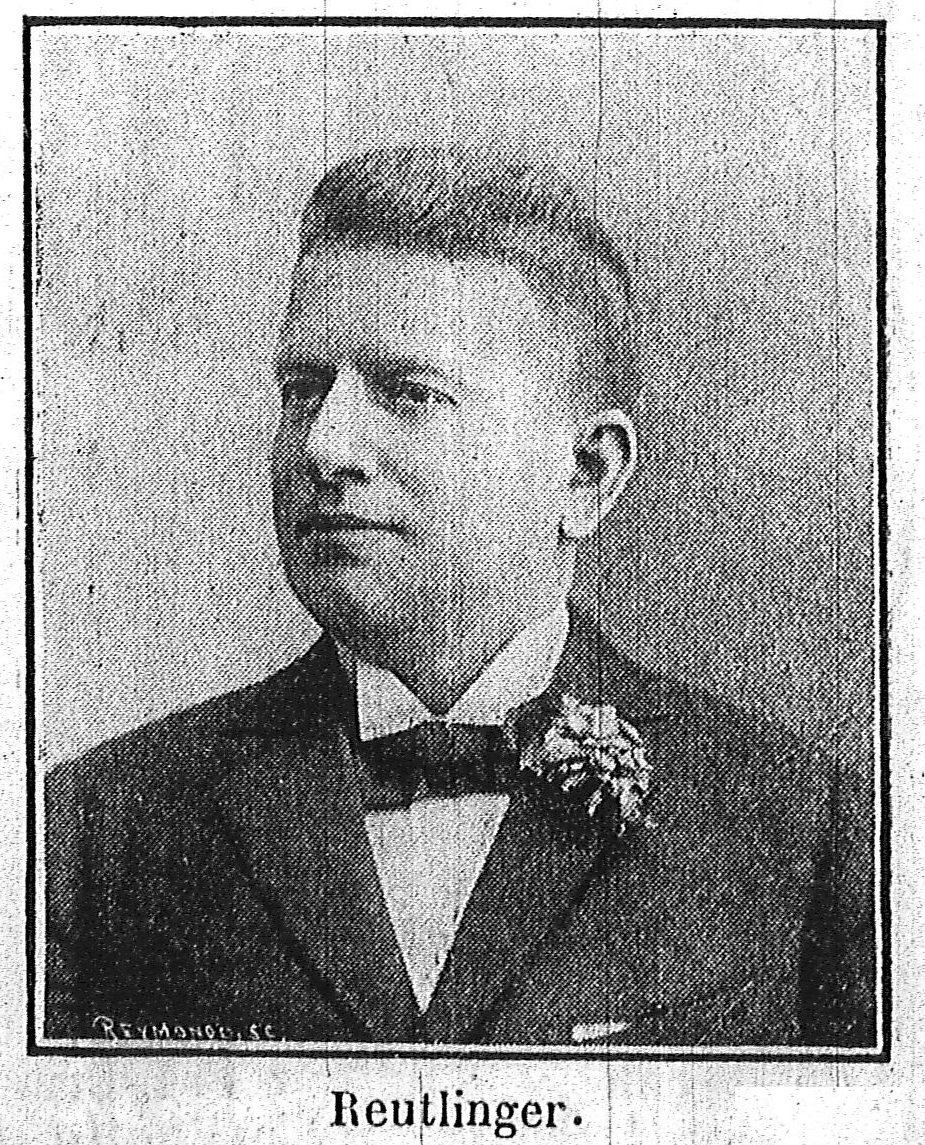
Simon-Max

Nicolas-Marie Simon (1852 in Reims, France – 1923), known as Simon-Max, was a French tenor who was mainly active in Paris in the field of opera-bouffe.

After musical studies in Reims he made his debut in 1875 at the Théâtre de la Renaissance as Janio in La reine Indigo then on 9 September that year at the Théâtre des Folies-Dramatiques as Anatole de Quillembois in Les cent vierges by Lecocq. At the Folies-Dramatiques he went on to sing in the premieres of Les cloches de Corneville on 17 April 1877 (Jean Grenicheux), La fille du tambour-major on 13 December 1879 and Madame Favart on 28 December 1878 (Hector de Boispréau).

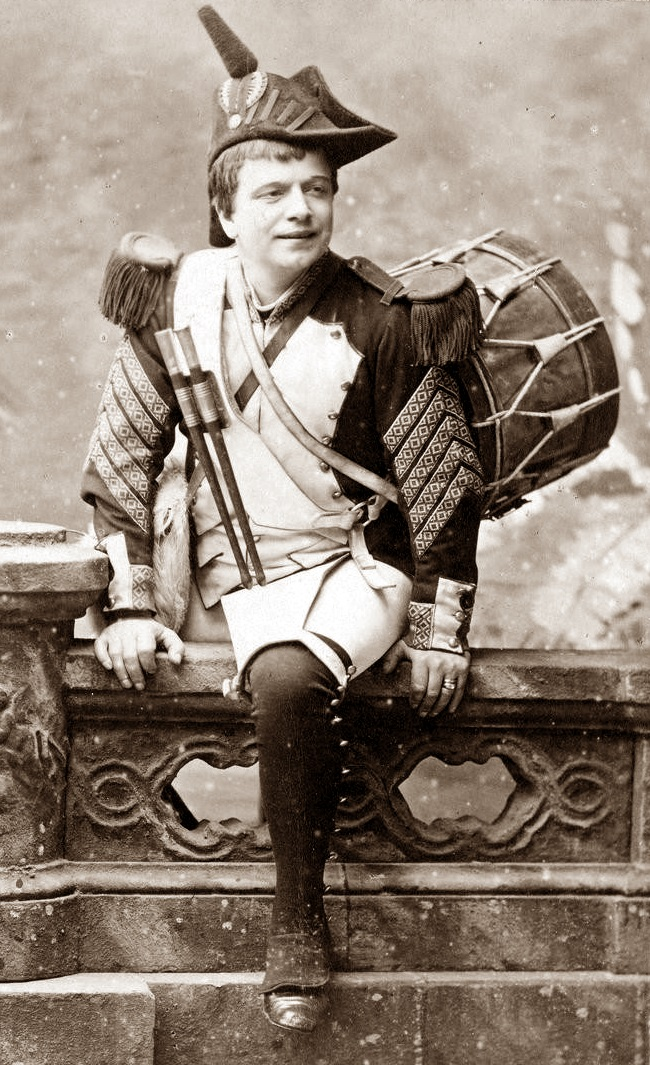
Simon-Max-Fille-du-tambour-major, 1879, Nadar

Other premieres included Cottinet in Le petit Parisien (16 January 1882), Inigo in La princesse des Canaries (9 February 1883), Ischabod in the French premiere of Rip (11 November 1884), Planchet in Les petits mousquetaires (5 March 1885), Michel in Fanfan la tulipe, (21 October 1882), Joseph Abrial in La fauvette du temple (17 November 1885), and singing in revivals of La fille de Madame Angot (Pomponnet) among others. He created Zizi in Ali-Baba in Brussels alongside his wife in 1887.

Simon-Max then worked at the Théâtre du Châtelet, at the Gaité (Mignapour in Le grand Mogol in 1889, creating Pinsonnet in Le voyage de Suzette on 20 January 1890, Pierrot in Le petit poucet in 1891), at the Théâtre des Bouffes-Parisiens (Don Géranios in Madame la Présidente, 1902, Plum-Quick in Florodora, 1903, and a 1908 revival of La petite boheme as Barbemuche).

Further appearances included the Théâtre de la Renaissance (Smithson in Miss Helyett, 1900, Fritzchen in Lischen et Fritzchen, 1900); and at the Théâtre Dejazet (Martelin in Radinol a du coton, 1901).

While the proprietor of the casino in Villerville, a whale was beached which Simon-Max bought, selling the oil and flesh before conserving the skin and converting the body to a theatre large enough to take 100 in the audience. The bizarre character of the Théâtre Baleine helped the success of a show entitled « Jonas Revue ». The whale theatre was moved to Paris, but burnt down the following winter.

He was the founding director of the Prévoyance théâtrale.

During the run of Les cloches de Corneville he met and married the young soprano lead Juliette Simon-Girard.
