= Les Trois Mousquetaires =

1921 film directed by Henri Diamant-Berger

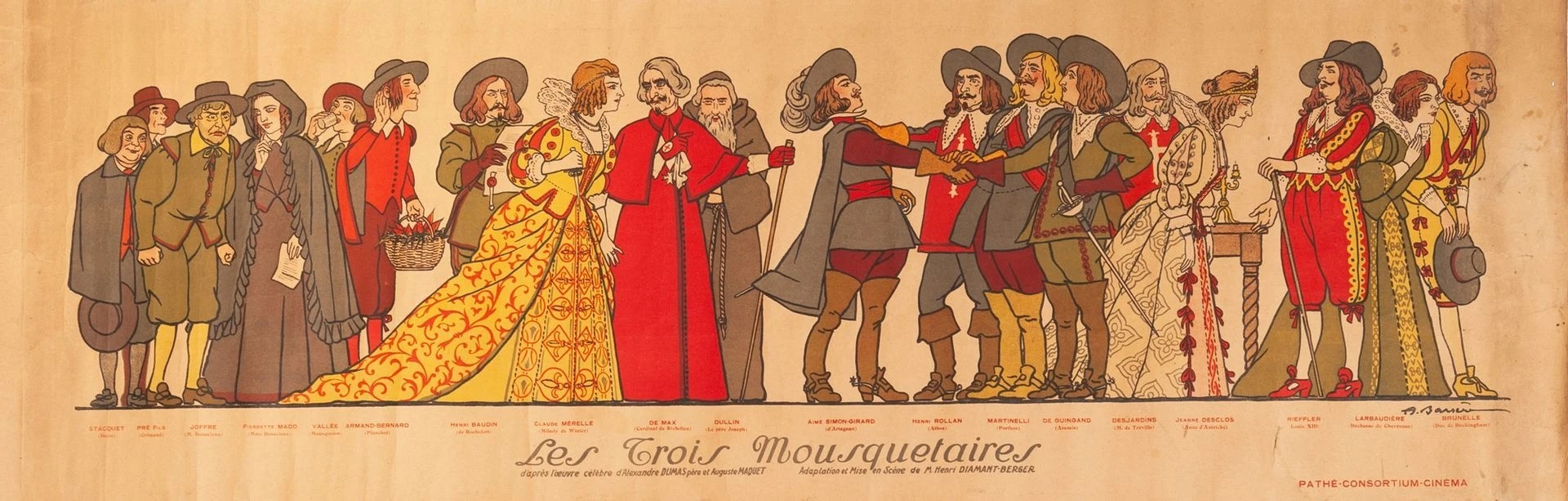
- Poster by Adrien Barrère (1921)
- Directed by: Henri Diamant-Berger
- Written by: Auguste Maquet
- Based on: The Three Musketeers; 1844 novel by Alexandre Dumas
- Starring: Aimé Simon-Girard; Henri Rollan; Charles Martinelli
- Cinematography: Maurice Desfassiaux
- Distributed by: Pathé Frères
- Release date: 1921
- Running time: 14 episodes with 26 minutes
- Country: France

Les Trois Mousquetaires (The Three Musketeers) is a 1921 French silent adventure film serial directed by Henri Diamant-Berger based on the 1844 novel by Alexandre Dumas, père.

== Cast ==
- Aimé Simon-Girard ... d'Artagnan
- Henri Rollan ... Athos
- Charles Martinelli ... Porthos
- Pierre de Guingand ... Aramis
- Pierrette Madd ... Madame Bonacieux
- Jean Joffre ... M. Bonacieux
- Jeanne Desclos ... The queen Anne d'Autriche
- Édouard de Max ... Richelieu
- Claude Mérelle ... Milady de Winter
- Henri Baudin ... Rochefort
- Charles Dullin... Father Joseph
- Maxime Desjardins ... Tréville
- Armand Bernard ... Planchet
- Louis Pré Fils ... Grimaud
- Antoine Stacquet ... Bazin
- Marcel Vallée ... Mousqueton
- Germaine Larbaudrière ... The duchesse de Chevreuse
- Gaston Jacquet ... De Winter
- Blanche Altem ... Doña Estefana
- Mme. Joffre ... The Mother Superior
- Georgette Sorelle ... A sister
- Paul Hubert ... Felton
