= Huchet =

Huchet is a surname of French origin. Notable people with that name include:

- Éric Huchet (born 1962), French lyric tenor
- Sarah Huchet (born 1994), French footballer
- Francis Joseph Huchet (1927–1959), Jersey criminal
- Claire Huchet Bishop (1898–1993), Swiss children's writer and librarian

== See also ==
- Émile-Huchet, thermal power plant in Moselle department, France
