= Madame Favart =

Opéra comique, or operetta, by Jacques Offenbach

Jacques Offenbach by Nadar, c. 1860s

Madame Favart (French pronunciation: [madam favaʁ]) is an opéra comique, or operetta, in three acts by Jacques Offenbach. The French libretto was written by Alfred Duru and Henri Chivot.

== Performance history ==
After defeat in the Franco-Prussian War (1870) ended Napoleon III's reign, Offenbach's popularity declined in Paris, and he toured Britain and the United States. He continued producing new operettas in Paris, but most of the decade would pass before he enjoyed another hit.

Madame Favart was first staged at the Théâtre des Folies-Dramatiques in Paris on 28 December 1878, starring Juliette Simon-Girard in the title role and Simon-Max as Hector de Boispréau; it played for 208 performances. A new production was mounted at the Théâtre des Bouffes-Parisiens on 4 March 1884, then at the Théâtre des Menus-Plaisirs in 1888 with Anna Judic in the title role. Other productions in Paris include 1911 at the Théâtre Apollo and at the same theatre in 1913.

It was mounted in a version by Julius Hopp at the Theater an der Wien with Marie Geistinger on 7 February 1879, and later the same year in Leipzig and Berlin.

The work was very popular in the 19th century, not only in France. It was revived, as a co-production between the Paris Opéra Comique, the Opéra de Limoges and the Théâtre de Caen in a setting by Anne Kessler in June 2019 at the Salle Favart in Paris, with Marion Lebègue in the title rôle and Anne-Catherine Gillet as Suzanne ; Laurent Campellone conducted.

== English adaptation ==
An English version, adapted by H. B. Farnie, opened at the Strand Theatre in London on 12 April 1879 starring Florence St. John in the title role, Claude Marius (1850–1896) as Favart, and Walter H. Fisher, then Henry Bracy as Hector. The production famously ran for 502 performances, remarkably successful for the time, although it marked the last high point of the conquest of London by the French composer, whose place, already challenged by Lecocq and Planquette in the British capital, was soon taken by Gilbert and Sullivan.

== Roles ==
Premiere poster

Role	Voice type	Premiere cast, December 28, 1878, (Conductor: Jacques Offenbach)
Madame Favart, an actress	soprano	Juliette Simon-Girard
Charles-Simon Favart, her husband, a playwright	baritone	Lepers
Hector de Boispréau	tenor	Simon-Max
Major Cotignac	bass	François-Louis Luco
Suzanne, his daughter	soprano	Marie Gélabert
Marquis de Pontsablé	tenor	Édouard Maugé
Biscotin, an innkeeper	bass	Jean-Baptiste Octave
Sergent Larose	tenor	Jules Speck
Travellers, Guests, Officers and Soldiers, Fifes and Cantinières, Cooks, Inn waiters, the cast of 'La Chercheuse d’esprit'

== Synopsis ==
Place: France
Time: 18th century

It is a fantasy plot built around the real-life celebrated French actress Marie Justine Benoîte Duronceray (1727–1775), her playwright-manager husband Charles-Simon Favart (1710–1792) and the actress-admiring general Maurice de Saxe (1696–1750), who also appears in the verismo opera Adriana Lecouvreur.

At an inn in Arras a coach arrives and the passengers go to their rooms. Among them is Major Cotignac and his daughter Suzanne, who have been followed on horseback by Hector de Boispréault, who wants to marry Suzanne. Cotignac is trying to secure a post for a relative to whom the major will offer his daughter's hand once the appointment is confirmed. On discovering that Suzanne and Hector are secretly in love, he agrees that if Hector can obtain the position of police lieutenant, he may marry her.

The innkeeper Biscotin is hiding in his cellar the writer Favart, who has fled to escape the Maréchal de Saxe because his wife (the Madame Favart of the title) has refused the Maréchal's advances, for which the noble has had her put in a convent. But Justine Favart now arrives at the inn, disguised as a street singer, having escaped the nuns. She is searching for her husband; but is amazed to find an old childhood mate Hector. Soldiers now enter to search the inn for Favart, but she manages to get them merry and sends them off on a false scent. Hector is unable to obtain the police appointment, but Favart, now in disguise and ready to flee with his wife, to elope with Suzanne. Cotignac enters, furious at having been made to wait by the Governor, who had been flirted with by Madame Favart pretending to be Hector's wife, thus winning the position for Hector. Hector, Suzanne and the Favarts (in disguise) go off to Douai.

By act 2, Hector and Suzanne are wed, and he has begun work in Douai, with the Favarts playing his servants. Pontsablé arrives unannounced and invites himself to stay with the new police lieutenant and his wife; so Madame Favart is obliged to again impersonate Hector's wife while her husband interrupts the Governor's advances at strategic moments. Madame Favart pretends to faint when the Governor tells her that he knows where Favart is in hiding. At a reception for Hector as the new police lieutenant, the Governor arrives, with Mme. Favart in yet another disguise, this time the Comtesse de Montgriffon, who persuades Pontsablé that the real Madame Favart is on the road to Saint-Omer. Pontsablé dashes off in pursuit, only to return in company with the real Comtesse de Montgriffon who has told him that Madame Favart is disguised as a servant-girl, who is now Suzanne in disguise. He arrests her, believing her to be Madame Favart and sends her to the Camp of Maréchal de Saxe in Fontenoy.

The third act takes place in the camp at Fontenoy where Cotignac announces that Parisian star Mme. Favart will perform in La Chercheuse d'esprit by her husband. Suzanne is anxious that if she has to go on stage it will be obvious that she is not the actress. Now Hector and Justine arrive at the camp disguised as a pair of Tyroleans; she is amazed to see that she is billed to appear before the camp, including the King. She goes to his tent to try to explain her situation, but the monarch believes that she is just acting. Just as Pontsablé is about to wreak vengeance on Suzanne and Hector, Madame Favart pulls a note from a bouquet given by the King announcing the resignation of the Governor. Hector and Suzanne are now free to go and Favart is appointed as the manager of the Opéra-Comique.

== List of musical numbers ==
Act 1

- Overture
- Trio and couplets (Suzanne, Hector, Favart)
- Couplets, "Dans une cave obscure" (Favart)
- Chorus and scena (Mme Favart)
- Couplets (Mme Favart)
- Couplets, "Ma mere aux vignes m'envoyit" (Mme Favart)
- Escape trio (Favart, Hector, Suzanne)
- Finale (Couplets and stretta)

Act 2

- Entracte
- Romance, "Suzanne est aujourd'hui ma femme" (Hector)
- Chanson de l'échaudé, "Quand du four on le retire" (Favart)
- Couplets (Pontsablé)
- Quartet (Suzanne, Hector, Mme Favart, Favart)
- Minuet and rondo, "Je passe sur mon enfance" (Mme Favart)
- Finale

Act 3

- Entracte
- Romance, "Quand il cherche dans sa cervelle" (Favart)
- Chorus and Tyrolienne (Mme Favart, Hector)
- Couplets (Suzanne, Hector)
- Air (Mme Favart)
- Chorus and duet (Mme Favart, Favart)

== Recordings ==
- Recordings listed on operadis-opera-discography.org.uk
