= Richard Traubner =

Richard Traubner

Richard Traubner (November 24, 1946 – February 25, 2013) was an American journalist, author, operetta scholar and historian, and lecturer on theatre and (mostly musical) film. His best-known book, Operetta: A Theatrical History, was first published in 1983.

According to Opera News, "Traubner was universally regarded as the foremost expert on operetta in the U.S." He reviewed numerous opera and theatre productions and wrote widely on opera, musical theatre, classical music and film. He also wrote reviews, liner and program notes and participated in theatre productions as translator, director and designer.

== Biography ==
Traubner was the son of Muriel and Edward Traubner. He attended Boston University, where he was president of the B. U. Savoyards. He received his Ph.D. from New York University. From 1971 to 1977, he was the editor of The Palace Peeper, the newsletter of the Gilbert and Sullivan Society of New York.

His book on the history of operetta was first published in 1983 and won the 17th annual ASCAP-Deems Taylor Award. According to MusicWeb International, Traubner's book is "One of the best reference books of the musical theatre. ... Apart from [Kurt Gänzl]'s The British Musical Theatre and Musicals, there is no better book than this to dip into for acquiring a perspective on shows or the activity surrounding a particular production. Of especial interest ... is the valuable detail Traubner gives about composers' backgrounds, training and career structure. ... Traubner ... writes in an easy style". John Kenrick calls the book "The ultimate love letter to operetta, with superb scholarship throughout." The book "is still the definitive work on the subject". American Record Guide calls it "the standard work on the subject". The Gramophone wrote:

"Operetta... is history in the best sense, not just chronology: the development and diffusion of operetta, the complex international web of influence, imitation and adaptation are firmly mapped... Traubner records not only the majority of noteworthy premières but the dates and places of notable foreign productions, as well as important or influential revivals, including modern ones.... He leaves plenty of space for reflection and comment, allowing the reader to trace such threads as the importance of topical reference, even parody (parody of grand opera, not least) in operetta and the crucial element of nostalgia in this genre.... Traubner's book, indeed, provides all the groundwork for a future study of operetta as an index of socio-political attitudes.... I know of no more readable or (save for his rather scrappy treatment of zarzuela) more comprehensive treatment of that subject.

Traubner wrote widely about opera, musical theatre, film and classical music, as well as reviewing and numerous opera and theatre productions, as a frequent contributor to Opera News, The New York Times, The Economist, American Record Guide and many other publications. He frequently provided notes for recordings and operetta productions. He translated into English, directed and designed sets for many European operettas in the U.S. In 2000 and 2001, he was the designer in residence at Ohio Light Opera and designed and translated numerous productions for them, directing some. He also designed for Harrisburg Opera in Pennsylvania.

Traubner lived in New York City. He was married to Andrea Traubner nee Schuster since 1971, and had a sister, Carol Epstein. He died of ALS at age 66.

== Works ==
- Operetta: a theatrical history, 2nd edition, London: Routledge, 2003, ISBN 0-415-96641-8
- The Great movie series, contributing editor, South Brunswick: A. S. Barnes (1971) ISBN 0-498-07847-7
- The Metropolitan Opera Guide to Opera on Video, Contributor, Paul Gruber (ed.) (1997) ISBN 0-393-04536-6
- Morin, Alexander J. and Harold C. Schonberg (Traubner, contributor). Classical Music: the listener's companion, Hal Leonard Corporation (2002) ISBN 0-87930-638-6
