= Robert Planquette =

French composer of songs and operettas

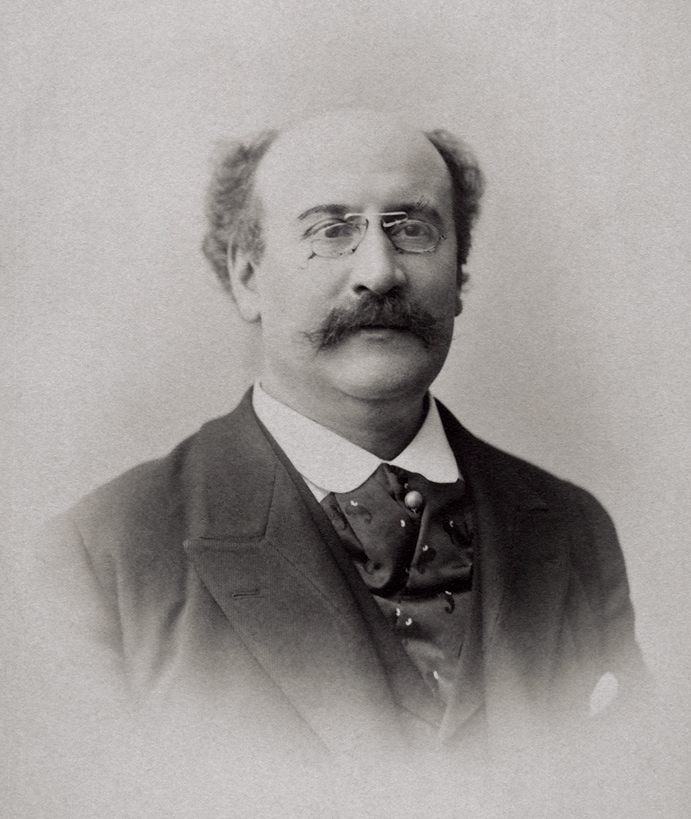
Planquette by Paul Boyer

Jean Robert Planquette (French pronunciation: [ʒɑ̃ ʁɔbɛʁ plɑ̃kɛt]; 31 July 1848 – 28 January 1903) was a French composer of songs and operettas.

Several of Planquette's operettas were extraordinarily successful in Britain, especially Les cloches de Corneville (1878), the length of whose initial London run broke all worldwide records for any piece of musical theatre up to that time. Rip Van Winkle (1882) also earned international fame.

== Life and career ==
The son of a singer, Planquette was born in Paris and educated at the Paris Conservatoire. He did not finish his studies, lacking the funds to do so, and worked as a café pianist and composer and singing (he was a tenor). A few romances that he composed brought less fame than did his song, "Sambre et Meuse", first sung in 1867 by Lucien Fugère, who went on to be one of the foremost French opera singers of his day.

In 1876, the director of the Théâtre des Folies-Dramatiques gave Planquette a commission to compose his first operetta, Les cloches de Corneville. It opened in Paris in 1877, running for an extremely successful 480 performances, and then enjoyed an astonishing London run, beginning in 1878, of a record-breaking 708 performances. Planquette's music has been praised for its pathos and romantic feeling. Le Chevalier Gaston was produced in 1879 with little success. In 1880 came Les Voltigeurs du 32ieme which had a long run in London in 1887 as The Old Guard, and La Cantiniére, which was translated into English as Nectarine, though never produced.

In 1882 Rip Van Winkle was produced in London and subsequently given in Paris as Rip, in both cases with great success. The libretto is an adaptation by H. B. Farnie of Washington Irving's famous tale. In 1884 the phenomenon of an opera by a French composer being produced in London before being heard in Paris was repeated in Nell Gwynne, which was modestly successful, but failed when produced in Paris as La Princesse Colombine. It was followed by La Crémaillere (Paris, 1885), Surcouf (Paris, 1887; London, as Paul Jones, 1889), Captain Thérése (London, 1887), La Cocarde tricolore (Paris, 1892), Le Talisman (Paris, 1892), Panurge (Paris, 1895) and Mam'zelle Quat'sous (Paris, 1897).

Le régiment de Sambre et Meuse
An 1870 French song about the Army of Sambre-et-Meuse by Robert Planquette and Paul Cézano. Sung by Pierre d'Assy.

== Legacy ==
Marie de Pierpont arranged some of Planquette’s works for piano in 1881.

"The Song of the Cabin Boy," a barcarolle from Planquette's Les cloches de Corneville was played on the violin by W.K.L. Dickson in the first experiment in history in synchronizing sound and motion pictures, in 1894. It is viewable online as The Dickson Experimental Sound Film.

Planquette’s march Le Régiment de Sambre et Meuse, has achieved fame in an arrangement for brass band; it is the tune used by the Ohio State University Marching Band when performing their famed Script Ohio formation. The original orchestral version of the march has been recorded by the Boston Pops Orchestra conducted by Arthur Fiedler and appears on the RCA Living Stereo CD Marches in Hi-Fi.

== Works ==
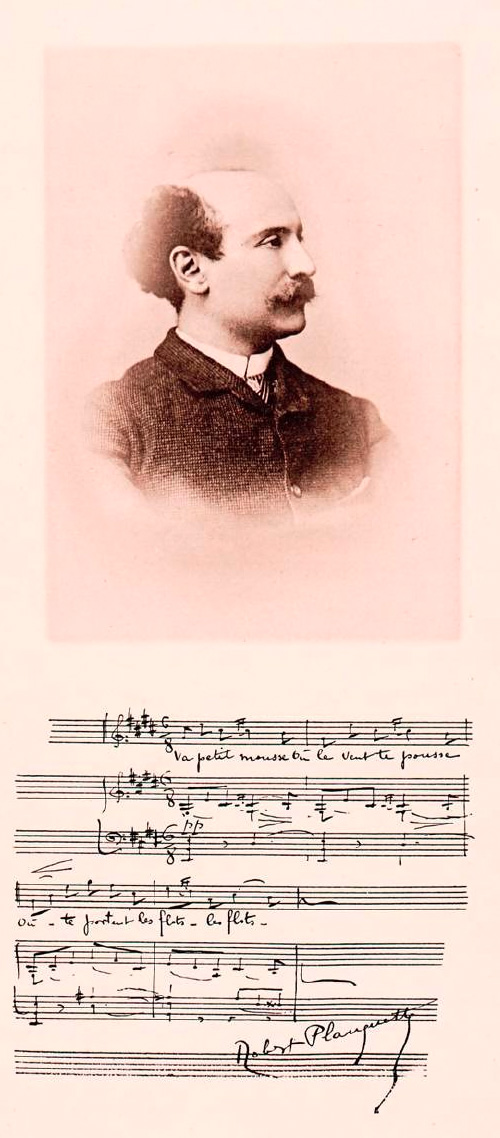
Planquette (c. 1890; album leaf with photo portrait and autograph musical quotation)

All operettas and all premieres in Paris, unless otherwise noted.

- Méfie-toi de Pharaon, one act, 1872, Eldorado
- Le serment de Mme Grégoire, 1874, Eldorado
- Paille d'avoine, one act, 12 March 1874, Théâtre des Délassements-Comiques
- Le valet de coeur, saynète, one act, 1875, Alcazar d'Eté
- Le péage, c 1876, Eldorado
- Les cloches de Corneville, opéra comique, four acts, 19 April 1877, Théâtre des Folies-Dramatiques
- Le chevalier Gaston, one act, 8 February 1879, Opéra, Monte Carlo
- Les voltigeurs de la 32ème, three acts, 7 January 1880, Renaissance
- La cantinière, three acts, 26 October 1880, Théâtre de Nouveautés
- Rip van Winkle (Rip-Rip), three acts, 14 October 1882, Comedy Theatre, London
- Les chevaux-légers, one act, 1882
- Nell Gwynne (La princesse Colombine), three acts, 7 February 1884, Avenue Theatre, London
- La crémaillere, three acts, 28 November 1885, Nouveautés
- Surcouf, three acts, 6 October 1887, Folies-Dramatiques
- Captain Thérése, 1887, three acts, 25 August 1890, Prince of Wales Theatre, London
- La cocarde tricolore, three acts, 12 February 1892, Folies-Dramatiques
- Le talisman, three acts, 20 January 1893, Théâtre de la Gaîté
- Les vingt-huit jours de Champignolette, 17 September 1895, République
- Panurge, 1895, three acts, 22 November 1895, Gaîté
- Mam'zelle Quat'sous, four acts, 19 April 1897 Gaîté
- Le fiancé de Margot, one act, 1900
- Le paradis de Mahomet, three acts, completed by Louis Ganne, 15 May 1906, Variétés
