= Théâtre des Folies-Dramatiques =

Theatre in Paris in the 19th and 20th centuries

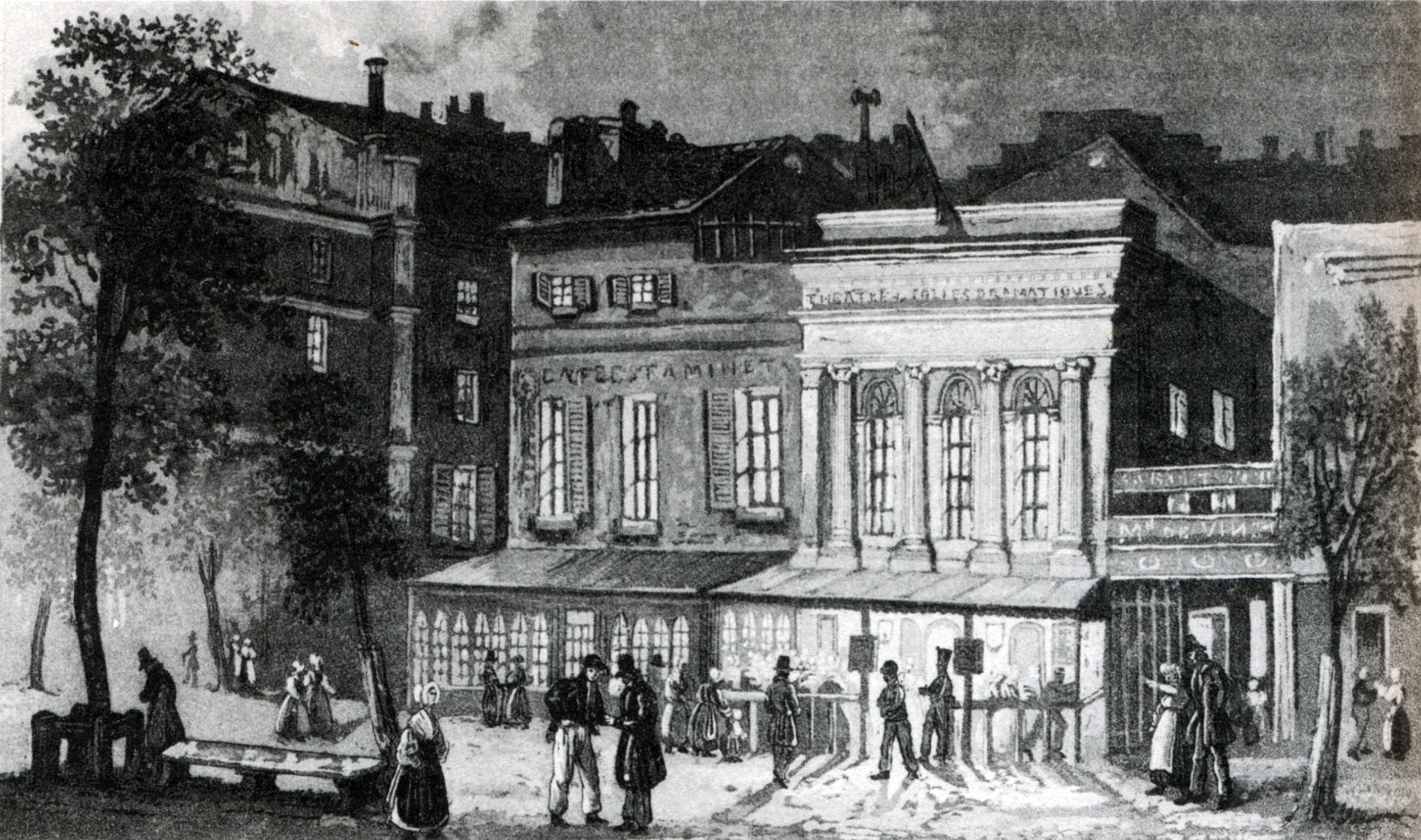
Théâtre des Folies-Dramatiques (c. 1835) on the Boulevard du Temple

The Théâtre des Folies-Dramatiques (French pronunciation: [teɑtʁ de fɔli dʁamatik]) was a theatre in Paris in the 19th and 20th centuries. Opened first in 1831 in the site of the old Théâtre de l'Ambigu-Comique on the Boulevard du Temple, under Frédérick Lemaître it became a noted venue for the genre of mélodrame. One of its earliest notable plays was The Tricolour Cockade (1831) by the Cogniard Brothers, which gave birth to the word chauvinism.

In 1862, the theatre moved to the rue de Bondy and the repertoire developed more in the field of operetta, La fille de Madame Angot by Charles Lecocq in 1873, Les cloches de Corneville by Robert Planquette in 1877, Madame Favart, by Jacques Offenbach in 1878, La fille du tambour-major by Offenbach in 1879, La fauvette du temple by André Messager in 1885, La Béarnaise by Messager in 1887 and Surcouf by Robert Planquette in October of the same year being among the premieres seen at the theatre. Other operettas and light operas were revived along with many vaudevilles. The French version of Rip was given at the Folies-Dramatiques in 1884.

In the 1920s, the Théâtre des Folies-Dramatiques saw a succession of musical comedies: Le Mariage de Pyramidon (1923), Le Rosier (1924), Le Million du Bouif (1924), Micheline (1924), Le Tour du monde d'une midinette (1924), Ernest (1924), Maurin des Maures (1925) and Souris blonde (1926).

In the 1930s, the theatre turned into a cinema.

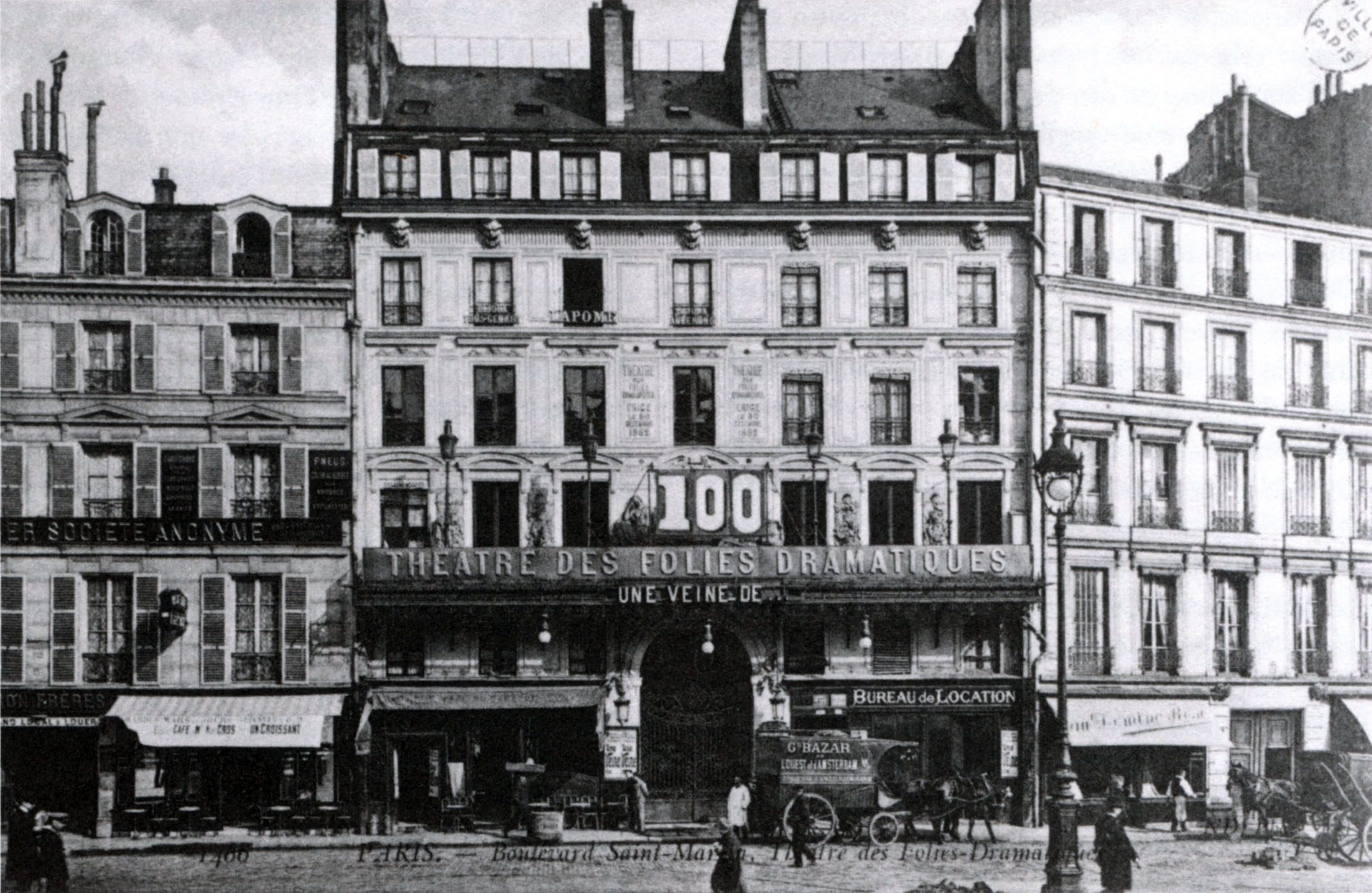
Théâtre des Folies-Dramatiques (1905) on the rue de Bondy

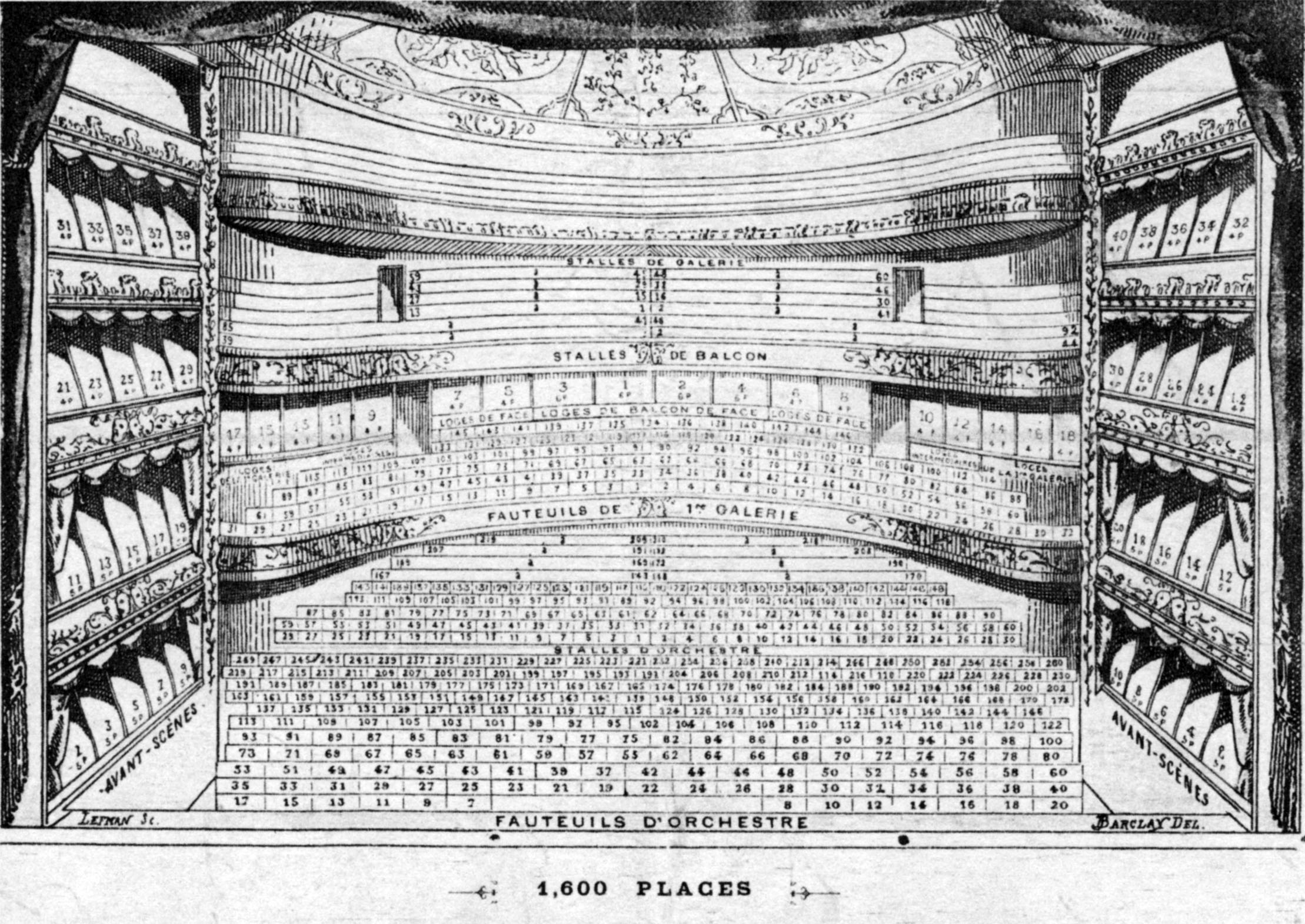
1875 seating chart
