= List of operettas =

For definition and discussion of the genre, see Operetta.

Operettas by composer:

== Paul Abraham (1892–1960) ==
- Victoria und ihr Husar (1930)
- Die Blume von Hawaii (1931)
- Ball im Savoy (1932)
- Roxy und ihr Wunderteam (1936)

== Leo Ascher (1880–1942) ==
- Hoheit tanzt Walzer (1912)

== Ralph Benatzky (1884–1957) ==
- Meine Schwester und ich (1930)
- Im weissen Rössl (1930)
- Bezauberndes Fräulein (1933)

== Leonard Bernstein (1918–1990) ==
- Candide (1956)

== Paul Burkhard (1911–1977) ==
- Hopsa (1935, revised 1957)
- Feuerwerk (Der schwarze Hecht) (1950)

== Alfred Cellier (1844–1891) ==
- Dorothy, 1886
- The Mountebanks, 1892

== Noël Coward (1899–1973) ==
- Bitter Sweet (1929)

== Rudolf Dellinger (1857–1910) ==
- Don Cesar (1885)

== Anton Diabelli (1781–1858) ==
- Adam in der Klemme

== Dicks (1823–1891) ==
- D'Mumm Sěs

== Nico Dostal (1895–1981) ==
- Clivia (1933)
- Monika (1937)
- Die ungarische Hochzeit (1939)
- Manina (1942)

== Edmund Eysler (1874–1949) ==
- Bruder Straubinger (1903)
- Die gold'ne Meisterin (1927)

== Leo Fall (1873–1925) ==
- Der fidele Bauer (1907)
- Die Dollarprinzessin (1907)
- Brüderlein fein (1909)
- Der liebe Augustin (1912)
- Madame Pompadour (1923)

== Harold Fraser-Simson (1872–1944) ==
- The Maid of the Mountains (1917)

== Rudolf Friml (1879–1972) ==
- The Firefly (1912)
- Rose-Marie (1923)
- The Vagabond King (1925)

== Edward German (1862–1936) ==
- The Emerald Isle, 1901
- Merrie England, 1902
- Tom Jones, 1907
- Fallen Fairies, 1909

== Jean Gilbert (1879–1942) ==
- Die keusche Susanne (1910, revised 1953)

== Walter Goetze (1883–1961) ==
- Ihre Hoheit, die Tänzerin (1919)
- Der goldene Pierrot (1934)

== Bruno Granichstaedten (1879–1944) ==
- Der Orlow (1925)

== Victor Herbert (1859–1924) ==
- The Fortune Teller
- Mlle. Modiste
- Naughty Marietta (1910)
- Sweethearts (1913)
- Babes in Toyland
- The Red Mill

== Hervé, Pen-name of Florimund Ronger (1825–1892) ==
- Les chevaliers de la Table Ronde 1866
- L'œil crevé 1867
- Chilpéric 1868
- Le petit Faust 1869
- Mam'zelle Nitouche (1883)

== Richard Heuberger (1850–1914) ==
- Der Opernball (1898)

== Jenő Huszka (1875–1960) ==
- Tilos a bemenet (No entry)
- Bob herceg (Prince Bob)
- Aranyvirág
- Gül Baba
- Tündérszerelem (Fairly love)
- Rébusz báró (Baron Rebus)
- Erzsébet (Elisabeth)
- Lili bárónö (Baroness Lili)
- Mária föhadnagy (Corporal Maria)
- Gyergyoi bál (Ball in Gyergyo)
- Szép Juhászné (The nice Mrs Juhasz)
- Szabadság, szerelem (Freedom and love)

== Victor Jacobi (1883–1921) ==
- A rátartós királykisasszony
- Legvitézebb Huszár (The Brave Hussar)
- Leányvásár (The Marriage Market)
- Szibill

== Georg Jarno (1868–1920) ==
- Die Försterchristel (1907)

== Leon Jessel (1871–1942) ==
- Das Schwarzwaldmädel (1917)

== Emmerich Kálmán, also known as Imre Kálmán (1882–1953) ==
- Tatárjárás (The Gay Hussars) (1909)
- Obsitos (The soldiers on Leave)
- Der Zigeunerprimas (The Gipsy violinist)
- The Blue House
- Gold gab ich für Eisen
- Die Csárdásfürstin (The Csardasprincess) (1915)
- Die Faschingsfee
- Das Hollandweibchen
- Die Bajadere
- Gräfin Mariza (Countess Mariza) (1924)
- Die Zirkusprinzessin (The Circus Princess)(1926)
- Golden Down
- Die Herzogin von Chicago (The Duchess of Chicago)
- Das Veilchen von Montmartre
- Der Teufelsreiter
- Kaiserin Josephine
- Marinka
- Arizona Lady

== Rudolf Kattnigg (1895–1955) ==
- Balkanliebe (1937)

== Walter Kollo (1878–1940) ==
- Drei alte Schachteln (1917)
- Die Frau ohne Kuss (1924)

== Reginald De Koven (1859–1920) ==
- The Knickerbockers
- Robin Hood
- Rob Roy
- Rip Van Winkle

== Fritz Kreisler (1875–1962) ==
- Sissy (1932)

== Eduard Künneke (1885–1953) ==
- Das Dorf ohne Glocke (1919)
- Der Vetter aus Dingsda (The Cousin from Nowhere) (1921)
- Liselott (1932)
- Glückliche Reise (1932)

== Hans Lang (1908–1992) ==
- Lisa, benimm dich! (1939)

== Charles Lecocq (1832–1918) ==
- Fleur de thé (1868)
- La fille de Madame Angot (1871)
- Les cent vierges (1872)
- Giroflé-Girofla (1874)
- Le petit due (1878)
- La petite mademoiselle (1879)
- Le Jour ella nuit (1881)
- La princesse des Canaries (1883)

== Franz Lehár (1870–1948) ==
- Wiener Frauen (Women from Vienna)
- Der Rastelbinder
- Göttergatte
- Juxheirat
- Die lustige Witwe (The Merry Widow) (1905)
- Der Mann mit drei Frauen (The man with three wives)
- Fürstenkind
- Der Graf von Luxemburg (1909)
- Zigeunerliebe (The gipsy love) (1910)
- Eva
- Die ideale Gattin (The Ideal Wife)
- Endlich allein (Finally alone) (1914)
- Sternglücker
- Wo die Lerche singt
- Die blaue Mazur
- Tangokönigin (The queen of tango)
- Frühling (Spring)
- Frasquita (1922)
- La danza delle Libelulle - Libellentanz
- Die gelbe Jacke (1923)
- Clo-clo
- Paganini (1925)
- Gigolette
- Der Zarewitsch (The Tsarevich) (1927)
- Friderike (1928)
- Das Land des Lächelns (The Land of Smiles) (1929)
- Schön ist die Welt (The World is nice) (1931)
- Giuditta (1934)

== Ruggero Leoncavallo (1857–1919) ==
- La jeunesse de Figaro
- Malbrouck
- La reginetta delle rose
- Are you there?
- La candidata
- Prestami tua moglie
- Goffredo Mameli
- A chi la giarrettiera?
- Il primo bacio
- La maschera nuda

== Paul Lincke (1866–1946) ==
- Frau Luna (1899)

== André Messager (1853–1929) ==
- Les p'tites Michu, 1897
- Véronique, 1898
- Monsieur Beaucaire, 1919
- Coups de roulis, 1928

== Carl Millöcker (1842–1899) ==
- Das verwunschene Schloss (1878)
- Die Dubarry (1879, major revision (T. Mackeben) 1938)
- Der Bettelstudent (1882)
- Gasparone (1884)
- Der arme Jonathan (1890, revised (W. Felsenstein) 1959)

== Oskar Nedbal (1874–1930) ==
- Polenblut (1913; later adapted into The Peasant Girl for Broadway)
- The Vendage (Vinobraní) (1916)

== Edmund Nick (1891–1974) ==
- Das kleine Hofkonzert (1935)

== Ivor Novello (1893–1951) ==
- The Dancing Years (1939)
- Glamorous Night (1935)
- King's Rhapsody (1942)
- Perchance to Dream (1945)

== Jacques Offenbach (1819–1880) ==
- Ba-ta-clan, 1855
- La chatte métamorphosée en femme, 1858
- Orpheus in the Underworld (Orphée aux enfers) 1858, revised 1874
- Geneviève de Brabant, 1859, revised 1867
- Le pont des soupirs 1861
- M. Choufleuri restera chez lui le . . ., 1861
- La belle Hélène 1865
- Barbe-bleue, 1866
- La Vie parisienne, 1866
- La Grande-Duchesse de Gérolstein, 1867
- Robinson Crusoé, 1867
- L'île de Tulipatan, 1868
- La Périchole, 1868
- Vert-Vert, 1869
- La princesse de Trébizonde, 1869
- Les brigands, 1869
- Le roi Carotte, 1872
- Fantasio, 1872
- La jolie parfumeuse, 1873
- Madame l'archiduc, 1874
- Whittington, 1874
- Le voyage dans la lune, 1875
- Le docteur Ox, 1877
- Maître Péronilla, 1878
- Madame Favart, 1878
- La fille du tambour-major, 1879

See also List of operettas by Jacques Offenbach

== August Pepöck (1887–1967) ==
- Hofball in Schönbrunn (1937)

== Fred Raymond (1900–1954) ==
- Maske in Blau (1937)
- Saison in Salzburg (Salzburger Nockerln) (1938)
- Geliebte Manuela (1951)

== Sigmund Romberg (1887–1951) ==
- The Student Prince (1924)
- The Desert Song (1926)
- The New Moon (1928)

== Hans Schanzara (1897–1984) ==
- Die Nachtigall (1947)

== Tito Schipa (1889–1965) ==
- La Principessa Liana (1929)

== Ludwig Schmidseder (1904–1971) ==
- Abschiedswalzer (1949)

== Friedrich Schröder (1910–1972) ==
- Hochzeitsnacht im Paradies (1942)

== Edward Solomon (1855–1895) ==
- Pickwick (1889)

== Petar Stojanović (1877–1957) ==
- Die Herzog von Reichstadt (Vojvoda od Rajhštata – The Duke of Reichstadt)
- Devojka na Mansardi (A Girl on Terrace)
- Der Tiger (Tigar)

== Robert Stolz (1880–1975) ==
- Der Tanz ins Glück (1921)
- Zwei Herzen im Dreivierteltakt (Der verlorene Walzer) (1933)

== Oscar Straus (1870–1954) ==
- Ein Walzertraum (1907)
- Der tapfere Soldat (The Chocolate Soldier) (1908)
- Drei Walzer (1935)
- Bozena (1952)

== Johann Strauss II (1825–1899) ==
- Indigo und die vierzig Räuber (1871)
- Der Karneval in Rom (1873)
- Die Fledermaus (The Bat) (1874)
- Cagliostro in Wien (Caliogstro in Vienna) (1875)
- Prinz Methusalem (1877)
- Blindekuh (1878)
- Das Spitzentuch der Königin (1880)
- Der lustige Krieg (1881)
- Eine Nacht in Venedig (A Night in Venice) (1883)
- Der Zigeunerbaron (The Gypsy Baron) (1885)
- Simplicius (1887)
- Fürstin Ninetta (1893)
- Jabuka (1894)
- Waldmeister (1895)
- Die Göttin der Vernunft (1897)
- Wiener Blut (1899)

== Heinrich Strecker (1893–1981) ==
- Ännchen von Tharau (1933)

== Arthur Sullivan (1842–1900) ==
  - With W. S. Gilbert (Gilbert and Sullivan)
- Trial by Jury (1875)
- The Sorcerer (1877)
- HMS Pinafore, or The Lass That Loved a Sailor (1878)
- The Pirates of Penzance, or The Slave of Duty (1879)
- Patience, or Bunthorne's Bride (1880–1881)
- Iolanthe, or The Peer and the Peri (1882)
- Princess Ida, or Castle Adamant (1883)
- The Mikado, or The Town of Titipu (1884–1885)
- Ruddigore, or The Witch's Curse (1886)
- The Yeomen of the Guard, or The Merryman and His Maid (1888)
- The Gondoliers, or The King of Barataria (1889)
- Utopia Limited, or The Flowers of Progress (1893)
- The Grand Duke, or The Statutory Duel (1895–1896)
  - With other librettists
- Cox and Box, (1866)
- The Contrabandista, (1867), revised and re-written as The Chieftain (1897)
- The Zoo (1875)
- Haddon Hall (1892)
- The Rose of Persia (1899)

== Franz von Suppé (1819–1895) ==
- Die schöne Galathee (1865)
- Banditenstreiche (1867)
- Fatinitza (1876)
- Boccaccio (1879)

== Albert Szirmai (1880–1967) ==
- Táncos Huszárok
- Mágnás Miska
- Mézeskalács

== Arno Vetterling (1903–1963) ==
- Liebe in der Lerchengasse (1936)

== Gerhard Winkler (1906–1977) ==
- Premiere in Mailand (1950)

== Vincent Youmans (1898–1946) ==
- No, no, Nanette (1924)

== Carl Zeller (1842–1898) ==
- Der Vogelhändler (1891)
- Der Obersteiger (1894)

== Carl Michael Ziehrer (1843–1922) ==
- König Jérôme oder Immer Lustick (1878)
- Die Landstreicher (1899)
- Die drei Wünsche (1901)
- Der Fremdenführer (1902)
- Der Schätzmeister (1904)
- Fesche Geister (1905)
- Ein tolles Mädel! (1907)
