= Blanche d'Antigny =

French actress and singer

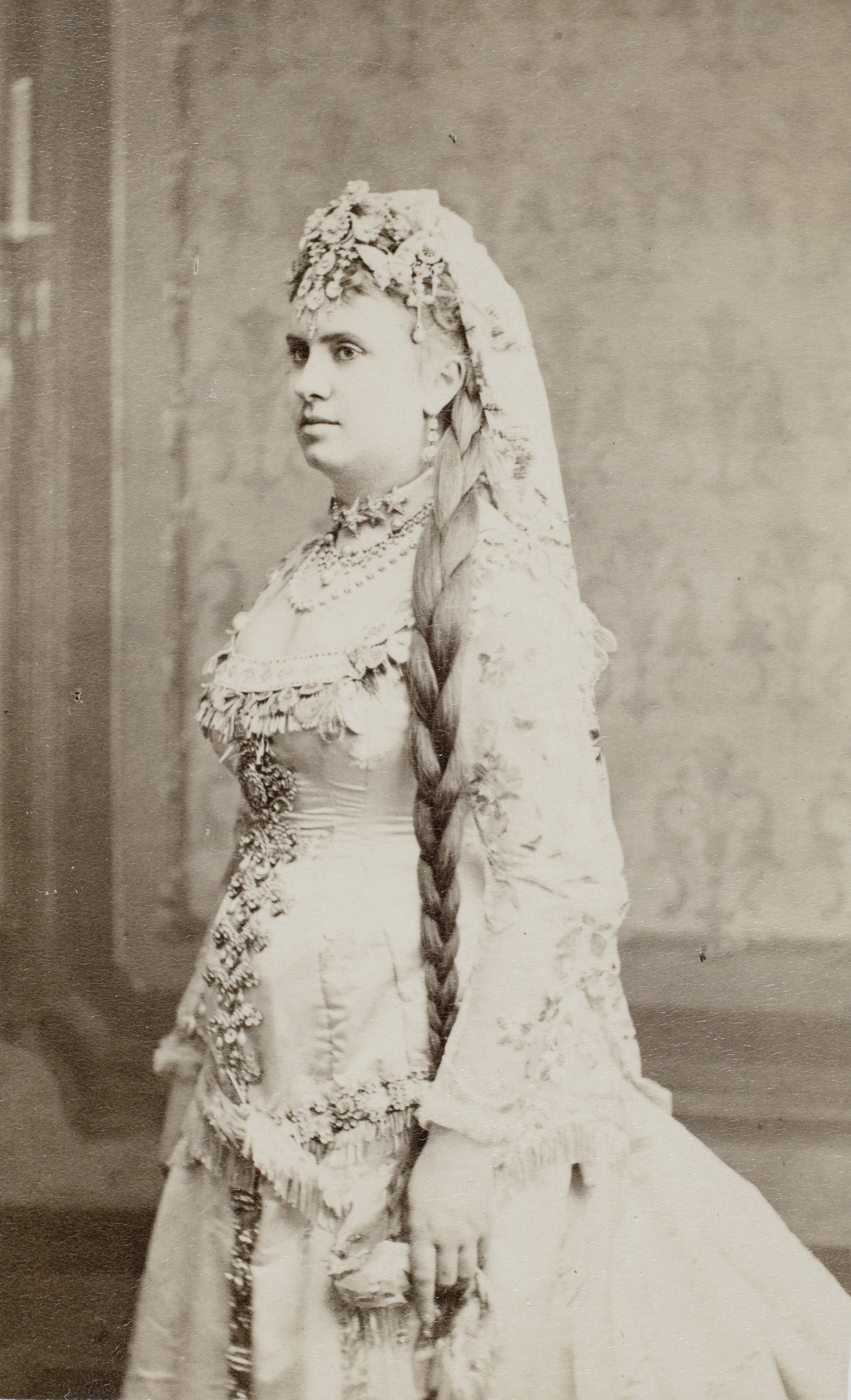
- Charles Reutlinger photograph (1860)
- Born: Marie Ernestine Antigny; 9 May 1840; Martizay, France
- Died: 30 June 1874 (aged 34)
- Occupations: Singer, actress, courtesan

Blanche d'Antigny (9 May 1840 – 30 June 1874) was a French singer, actress and courtesan whose fame today rests chiefly on the fact that Émile Zola used her as the principal model for his novel Nana. She was one of the most famous courtesans in Paris during the Second Empire.

== Early life ==
Blanche d'Antigny was born Marie Ernestine Antigny in Martizay, France. Her father, Jean Antigny, was the sacristan at a local church. By the time she reached her mid teenage years, the tales of her beauty and charm were quite known. She proudly kept the nickname given to her by other girls at the convent, who called her Blanche due to her beautiful complexion.

At age 14, she ran off to Bucharest with a lover whom she then abandoned. When she eventually made her return to Paris, she worked in the circus and in various dance halls.

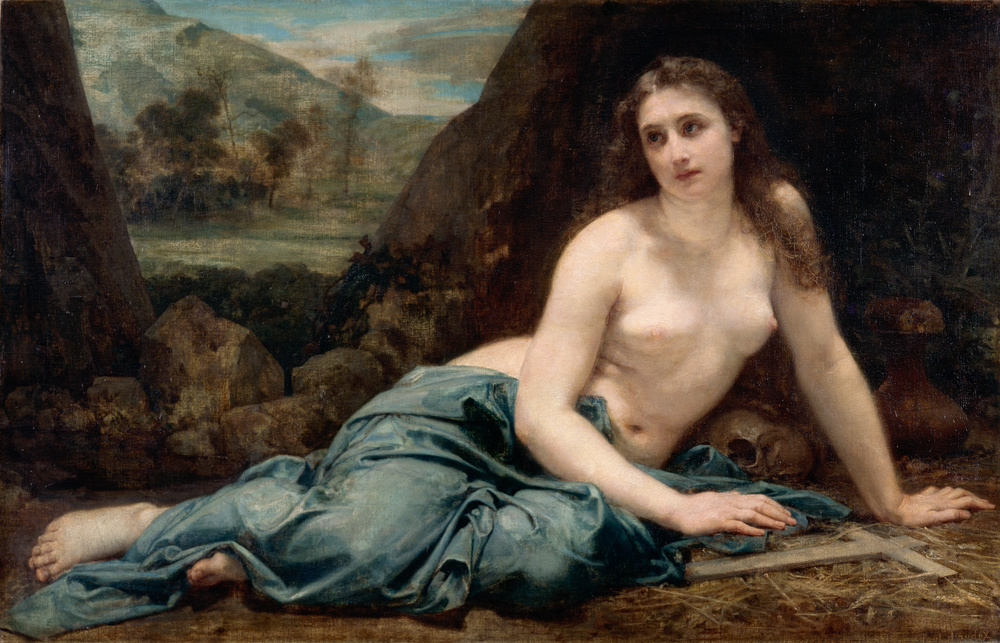
Penitent Magdalene (1858) by Baudry, modeled by d'Antigny.

She also posed for multiple artists, most famously appearing half-nude in Paul Baudry's Penitent Magdalene, which depicts the repentant saint Mary Magdalene.

D'Antigny became the mistress of the Russian police chief Mesentzov who took her to St. Petersburg in 1862 and in 1863 she was forced to leave Russia by special order of the Tsarina.

== Career as actress and courtesan ==
When she set it into her head to become a star on the operetta stage, everything happened exactly as Zola later described it in Nana. She was an immediate success on the stage and attracted scores of wealthy lovers. Hervé brought her out as Frédégonde in Chilpéric (1868), and he went on stage to play Faust to her Marguerite in his masterpiece Le petit Faust (1869), a brilliant parody of both Goethe's play and Gounod's opera. Between 1870 and 1873, d'Antigny played the leading roles in many of the hits of Hervé, Offenbach, and their disciples (Le tour du chien vert, L'œil crevé, La Vie parisienne, La Cocotte aux œufs d'or, etc.) . Her lovers showered her with gifts and spent enormous sums of money on her, but she was unable to hold on to any of it.

D'Antigny was a charming woman who was able to make many men of high status become infatuated with her. Although she was called one of the most seductive women of her time, her relationships were not solely based on physical attraction. D'Antigny was known for captivating men emotionally and intellectually, making her a highly influential figure in the period.

== Cairo and death ==
After a scandal caused by the financial ruin of one of her lovers, she thought it better to leave Paris for a while. In late 1873, she went to Egypt where she appeared on the stage in Cairo and had an affair with the Khedive. When she was asked why she brought her chambermaid and coachman to Cairo, although she had neither horses nor a coach there, she is reported to have answered: "What the hell! I owe Augustine 20,000 francs, and Justin 35,000; they wouldn't let me go without them!" D'Antigny returned from this tour infected with typhoid fever and later died. Her early death at age 34 led to her life being romanticized in French culture. Caroline Letessier, a fellow actress and courtesan, organized her funeral and paid for the expenses. D'Antigny is buried at Père Lachaise Cemetery in Paris.

== Sources ==
- Blyth, Henry (1970). Skittles: the last Victorian courtesan: the life and times of Catherine Walters. Hart-Davis. ISBN 9780246640178.
- Ditmore, Melissa Hope (2006). Encyclopedia of Prostitution and Sex Work. Greenwood Publishing Group. ISBN 9780313329708.
- Fryer, Paul (2005). The Opera Singer and the Silent Film. McFarland. ISBN 9780786420650.
- González, Julia Martínez (2014). "Sin límites entre el ángel y el monstruo: Naná y Sabine en la novela de Émile Zola". Thélème: Revista complutense de estudios franceses (in Spanish). 29 (2). ISSN 1139-9368.
- Houbre, Gabrielle (2006). "Courtesans under surveillance". Le livre des courtisanes: archives secrètes de la police des moeurs, 1861-1876 (in French). Tallandier. ISBN 9782847343441.
- Nagelkerke, Nico J. D. (2012). Courtesans and Consumption. Eburon Uitgeverij B.V. ISBN 9789059726031.
- Price, David (1998). Cancan!. Cygnus Arts. ISBN 9780838638200.
- Richardson, Joanna (1978). Zola. Weidenfeld and Nicolson.
- Vauzat, Guy (1933). Blanche d'Antigny, actrice et demi-mondaine 1840–1874. Paris: Charles Bosse.
- Zola, Émile (1972). Nana. translated with an introduction by George Holden. London: Penguin Classics.
