= List of operetta composers =

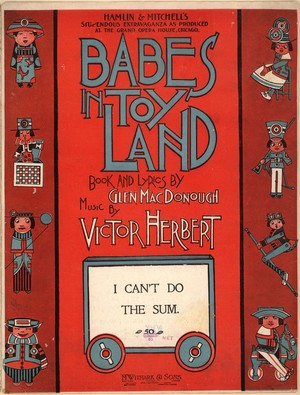
Sheet music from the operetta, Babes in Toyland, composed by Victor Herbert

Operetta (literally "little opera") is a genre of light opera – light in terms of the subject matter and light in terms of the music itself. Operetta also shares many characteristics with musical theatre. The following is a list of composers who have written works in this genre:

- Paul Abraham 2 November 1892 (Apatin) – 6 May 1960 (Hamburg)
- Leo Ascher 17 August 1880 (Vienna) – 25 February 1942 (New York City)
- Edmond Audran April 11, 1842 (Lyon) – August 17, 1901 (Tierceville)
- Joseph Beer May 7, 1908 (Gródek – November 23, 1987 (Nice)
- Ralph Benatzky June 5, 1884 (Moravské Budějovice) – October 16, 1957 (Zürich)
- Leonard Bernstein August 25, 1918 (Lawrence) – October 14, 1990 (New York City)
- Paul Burkhard December 21, 1911 (Zürich) – September 6, 1977 (Zell)
- Emmanuel Chabrier January 18, 1841 (Ambert) - September 13, 1894 (Paris)
- Mario Pasquale Costa July 24, 1858 (Taranto) – September 27, 1933 (Monte Carlo)
- Charles Cuvillier April, 24, 1877 (Paris) – February 14, 1955 (Paris)
- Reginald De Koven April 3, 1859 (Middletown, Connecticut) – January 16, 1920 (New York City)
- Rudolf Dellinger July 8, 1857 (Graslitz) – September 24, 1910 (Dresden)
- Anton Diabelli September 6, 1781 (Mattsee) – April 7, 1858 (Vienna)
- Nico Dostal November 27, 1895 (Korneuburg) – October 27, 1981 (Salzburg)
- Mihály Erdélyi May 28, 1895 (Szeged) – January 27, 1979 (Budapest)
- Edmund Eysler March 12, 1874 (Vienna) – October 4, 1949 (Vienna)
- Leo Fall February 2, 1873 (Olomouc) – September 16, 1925 (Vienna)
- Rudolf Friml December 7, 1879 (Prague) – November 12, 1972 (Los Angeles)
- Richard Genée February 7, 1823 (Danzig) – June 15, 1895 (Baden bei Wien)
- Edward German February 7, 1862 (Whitchurch, Shropshire) – November 11, 1936 (London)
- Kostas Giannidis 1903 (Smyrna) – 1984 (Athens)
- Jean Gilbert February 11, 1879 (Hamburg) – December 20, 1942 (Buenos Aires)
- Walter Goetze April 17, 1883 (Berlin) – March 24, 1961 (Berlin)
- Joseph Hellmesberger Jr. April 9, 1855 (Vienna) – 26 April 1907 (Vienna)
- Victor Herbert February 1, 1859 (Dublin) – May 26, 1924 (New York City)
- Hervé June 30, 1825 (Houdain) – November 4, 1892 (Paris)
- Richard Heuberger June 18, 1850 (Graz) – October 28, 1914 (Vienna)
- Friedrich Heinrich Himmel November 20, 1765 (Treuenbrietzen) – June 8, 1814 (Berlin)

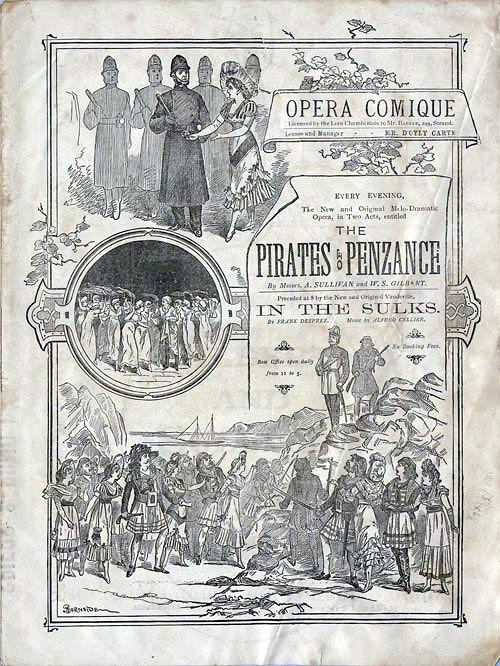
Programme cover for an 1881 production of The Pirates of Penzance, composed by Arthur Sullivan

- Igo Hofstetter June 1, 1926 (Linz) – March 2, 2002 (Linz)
- Jenő Huszka April 24, 1875 (Szeged) – February 2, 1960 (Budapest)
- Eduard Ingris February 11, 1905 (Zlonice) – January 11, 1991 (South Lake Tahoe, California)
- Victor Jacobi October 22, 1883 (Budapest) – December 10, 1921 (New York City)
- Georg Jarno June 3, 1868 (Budapest) – May 25, 1920 (Breslau)
- Leon Jessel January 22, 1871 (Stettin) – January 4, 1942 (Berlin)
- J. Rosamond Johnson August 11, 1873 (Jacksonville, Florida) – November 11, 1954 (New York City)
- Emmerich Kálmán October 24, 1882 (Siófok) – October 30, 1953 (Paris)
- Walter Kollo January 28, 1878 (Neidenburg) – September 30, 1940 (Berlin)
- Fritz Kreisler February 2, 1875 (Vienna) – January 29, 1962 (New York City)
- Eduard Künneke January 27, 1885 (Emmerich am Rhein) – October 27, 1953 (Berlin)
- Oscar de Lagoanère August 25, 1853 (Bordeaux) – May 23, 1918 (Paris)
- Calixa Lavallée December 28, 1842 (Verchères, Quebec) – January 21, 1891 (Boston)
- Alexandre Charles Lecocq June 3, 1832 (Paris) – October 24, 1918 (Paris)
- Franz Lehár April 30, 1870 (Komárom) – October 24, 1948 (Bad Ischl)
- Ruggero Leoncavallo April 23, 1857 (Naples) – August 9, 1919 (Montecatini)
- Paul Lincke 7 November 1866 (Berlin) – 3 September 1946 (Hahnenklee, Goslar)
- Pietro Mascagni December 7, 1863 (Livorno) – August 2, 1945 (Rome)
- John Henry Maunder February 21, 1858 (London) – January 21, 1920 (Brighton)
- André Messager December 30, 1853 (Montluçon) – February 24, 1929 (Paris)
- Karl Millöcker April 29, 1842 (Vienna) – December 31, 1899 (Baden bei Wien)
- Sigmund Mogulesko December 16, 1858 (Kalarash) – February 4, 1914 (New York City)
- Oskar Nedbal March 26, 1874 (Tábor) – December 24, 1930 (Zagreb)
- Edmund Nick September 22, 1891 (Reichenberg) – April 11, 1973 (Geretsried)
- Ivor Novello January 15, 1893 (Cardiff – March 6, 1951 (London)
- Jacques Offenbach June 20, 1819 (Cologne) – October 5, 1880 (Paris)
- Giuseppe Pietri May 6, 1886 (Campo nell'Elba) – August 11, 1946 (Milan)
- Robert Planquette July 31, 1848 (Paris – January 28, 1903 (Paris)
- Heinrich Proch July 22, 1809 (Vienna) – December 18, 1878, (Vienna)
- Lev Pulver December 18, 1883 (Yekaterinoslav) – 1970 (Moscow)
- Virgilio Ranzato May 7, 1882 (Venice) – August 20, 1937 (Como)
- Fred Raymond April 20, 1900 (Vienna) – January 10, 1954 (Überlingen)
- Emil Reesen May 30, 1887 (Copenhagen) – March 27, 1964 (Gentofte)
- Sigmund Romberg July 29, 1887 (Nagykanizsa) – November 9, 1951 (New York City)
- Theophrastos Sakellaridis 1883 (Athens) – 1950 (Athens)
- Spyridon Samaras 17 November/29 November 1861 (Corfu) – 25 March/7 April 1917 (Athens)
- Gaston Serpette November 4, 1846 (Nantes) – November 3, 1904 (Paris)
- Dmitri Shostakovich 25 September 1906 (Saint Petersburg) – 9 August 1975 (Moscow)
- Ludwig Schmidseder August 24, 1904 (Passau) – June 21, 1971 (Munich)
- Edward Solomon July 25, 1855 (London) – January 22, 189 (London)
- John Philip Sousa November 6, 1854 (Washington, D.C.) – March 6, 1932 (Reading, Pennsylvania)
- Petar Stojanović September 7, 1877 (Budapest) – September 11, 1957 (Belgrade)
- Robert Stolz August 25, 1880 (Graz) – June 27, 1975 (Berlin)
- Oscar Straus March 6, 1870 (Vienna) – January 11, 1954 (Bad Ischl)
- Johann Strauss II October 25, 1825 (Vienna – June 3, 1899 (Vienna)
- Johann Strauss III February 16, 1866 – January 9, 1939 (Berlin)
- Heinrich Strecker February 24, 1893 (Vienna) – June 28, 1981 (Baden bei Wien)
- Arthur Sullivan May 13, 1842 (London) – November 22, 1900 (London)
- Franz von Suppé April 18, 1819 (Split) – May 21, 1895 (Vienna)
- Albert Szirmai July 2, 1880 (Budapest) – January 15, 1967 (New York City)
- Oscar Ferdinand Telgmann c. 1855 (Mengeringhausen) – March 30, 1946 (Toronto)
- Claude Terrasse January 27, 1867 (L'Arbresle) – June 30, 1923 (Paris)
- Arthur Goring Thomas November 10, 1850 (Sussex) – March 20, 1892 (London)
- Ivo Tijardović September 18, 1895 (Split) – March 19, 1976 (Zagreb)
- Vincenzo Valente February 21, 1855 (Corigliano Calabro) – September 6, 1921 (Naples)
- Louis Varney May 30, 1844 (New Orleans) - August 20, 1908 (Cauterets)
- Zsigmond Vincze July 1, 1874 (Zombor) – June. 30, 1935 (Budapest)
- Ivan Zajc August 3, 1832 (near Rijeka) – December 16, 1914 (Zagreb)
- Carl Zeller June 19, 1842 (Sankt Peter in der Au) – August 17, 1898 (Baden bei Wien)
- Carl Michael Ziehrer May 2, 1843 (Vienna) – November 14, 1922 (Vienna)

== See also ==
- List of musical theatre composers
- List of zarzuela composers
