= Gül Baba (1940 film) =

1940 film

- Directed by: Kálmán Nádasdy
- Written by: Jenő Huszka (operetta); Géza Matolcsy
- Produced by: Géza Matolay
- Starring: Sándor Kömíves; Zita Szeleczky; Pál Jávor; Zoltán Makláry
- Cinematography: Árpád Makay
- Edited by: Zoltán Farkas
- Music by: Szabolcs Fényes; Jenö Huszka
- Production company: Magyar Írók Filmje
- Release date: 11 April 1940
- Running time: 105 minutes
- Country: Hungary
- Language: Hungarian

Gül Baba is a 1940 Hungarian musical film directed by Kálmán Nádasdy and starring Sándor Kömíves, Zita Szeleczky and Pál Jávor. It was based on the operetta Gül Baba composed by Jenő Huszka with a libretto by Ferenc Martos. It was shot at the Hunnia Studios in Budapest with the film's sets and costumes designed by the art director Klára B. Kokas. It was screened at the Venice Film Festival in September 1940.

== Cast ==
- Sándor Kömíves as Gül Baba
- Zita Szeleczky as Leila, Gül Baba lánya
- Pál Jávor as Gábor diák
- Zoltán Makláry as Mujkó cigány
- Margit Ladomerszky as Mujkóné
- Judit Farkas as Cigánylány
- Nándor Bihary as Ali basa
- Karola Szalay as Georgiai hercegnõ
- Mária Fáskuty as Zulejka
- Gyula Tapolczay as Zulfikár
- Márton Rátkai as Kádi
- Imre Toronyi as Kovácsmester
- György Kürthy as Budai bíró
- Dóra Fáy Kiss as Csaplároslány
- Lajos Kelemen as Fõhóhér
- Elemér Baló as Zarándokvezetõ
- György Gonda as Aga
- Zoltán Várkonyi as Student
- János Pásztor as Student
- Lajos Rajczy as Student
- Jenõ Szabó as Student
- Miklós Szabó as Student
- Gyula Terney as Student
- Sándor Illyés as Student
- Kálmán Hetényi as Student
- Tihamér Lázár as Student
- Antal Péterffy as Student

== Bibliography ==
- Petrucci, Antonio. Twenty Years of Cinema in Venice. International Exhibition of Cinematographic Art, 1952.
- Vilmos, Várkonyi. Jávor Pál: és a magyar film aranykora. Zima Szabolcs, 2013
