= Marcelle Lender =

French dancer and singer

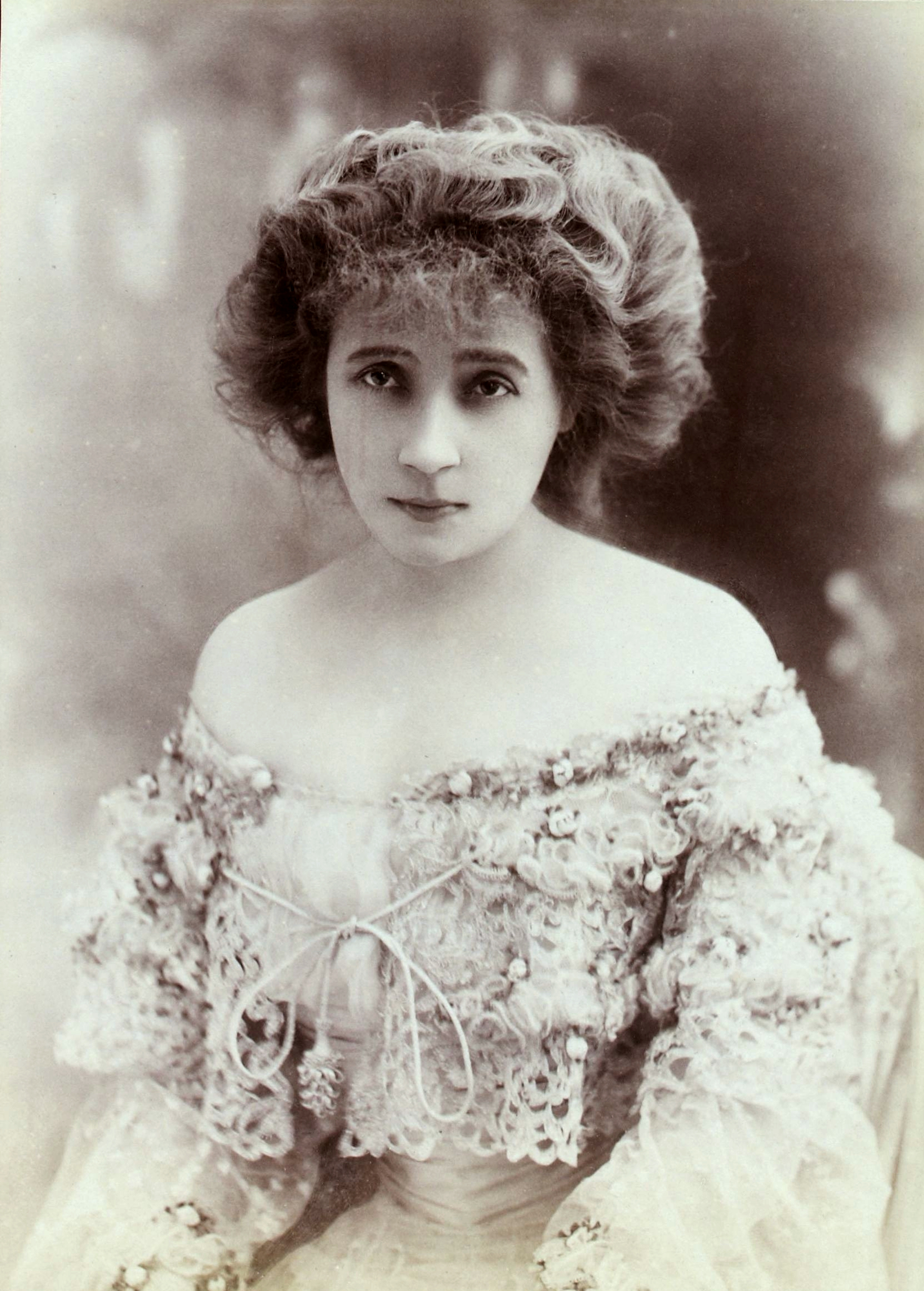
- Born: 1862
- Died: 1926

Marcelle Lender (1862 – 27 September 1926) was a French singer, dancer and entertainer made famous in paintings by Henri de Toulouse-Lautrec.

Born Anne-Marie Marcelle Bastien, she began dancing at the age of sixteen and within a few years made a name for herself performing at the Théâtre des Variétés in Paris.

Lender appears in several works by Lautrec but the most notable is the one of her dancing the Bolero during her February 1895 performance in the Hervé operetta Chilpéric. Lautrec's portrait of her in full costume, her flame-red hair accentuated by two red poppies worn like plumes, boosted Lender's popularity considerably after it appeared in a Paris magazine. The painting was eventually sold to a collector from the United States, and on her death in 1998 the painting's then owner, American Betsey Cushing Whitney, donated it to the National Gallery of Art in Washington, D.C.

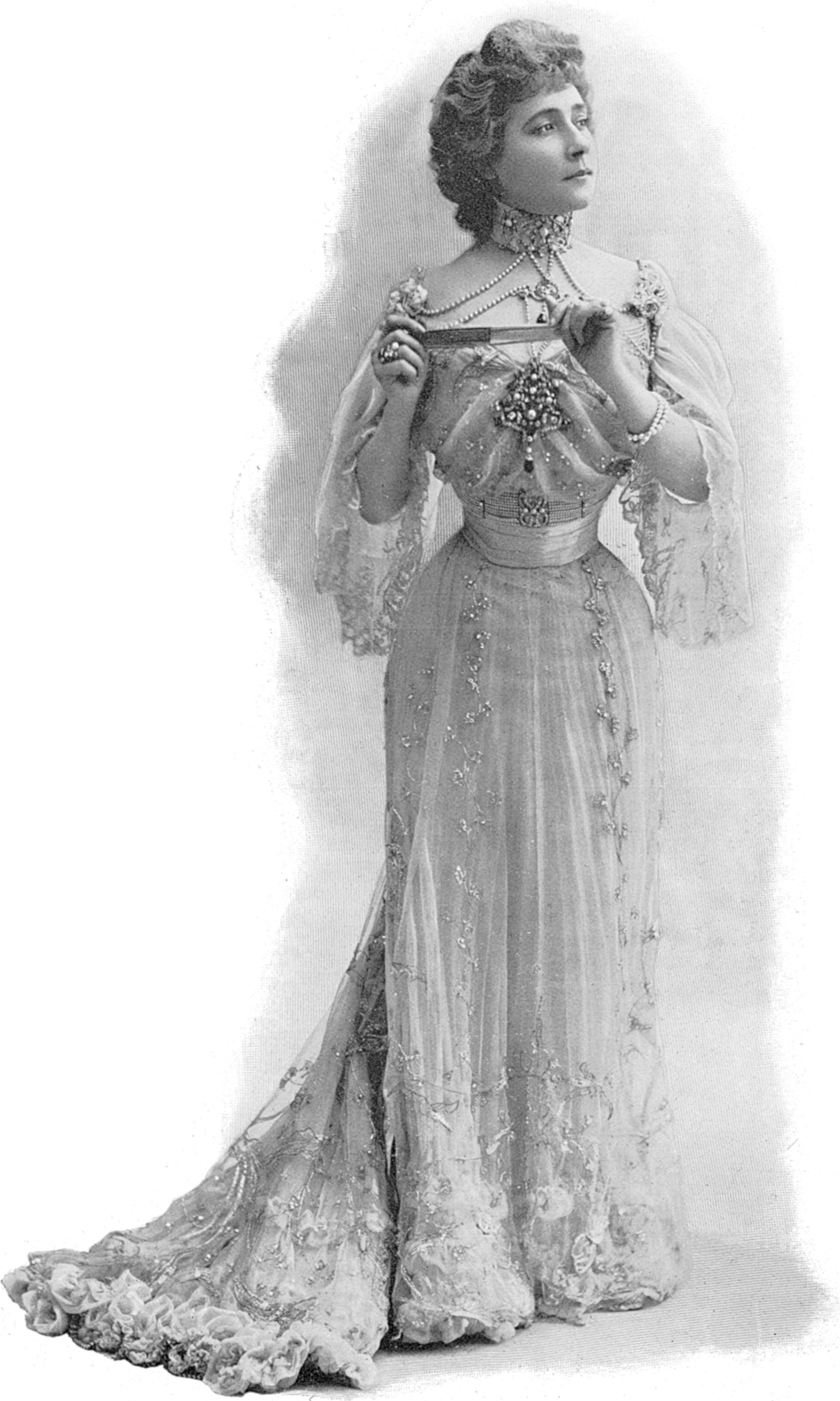
Marcelle Lender 1901

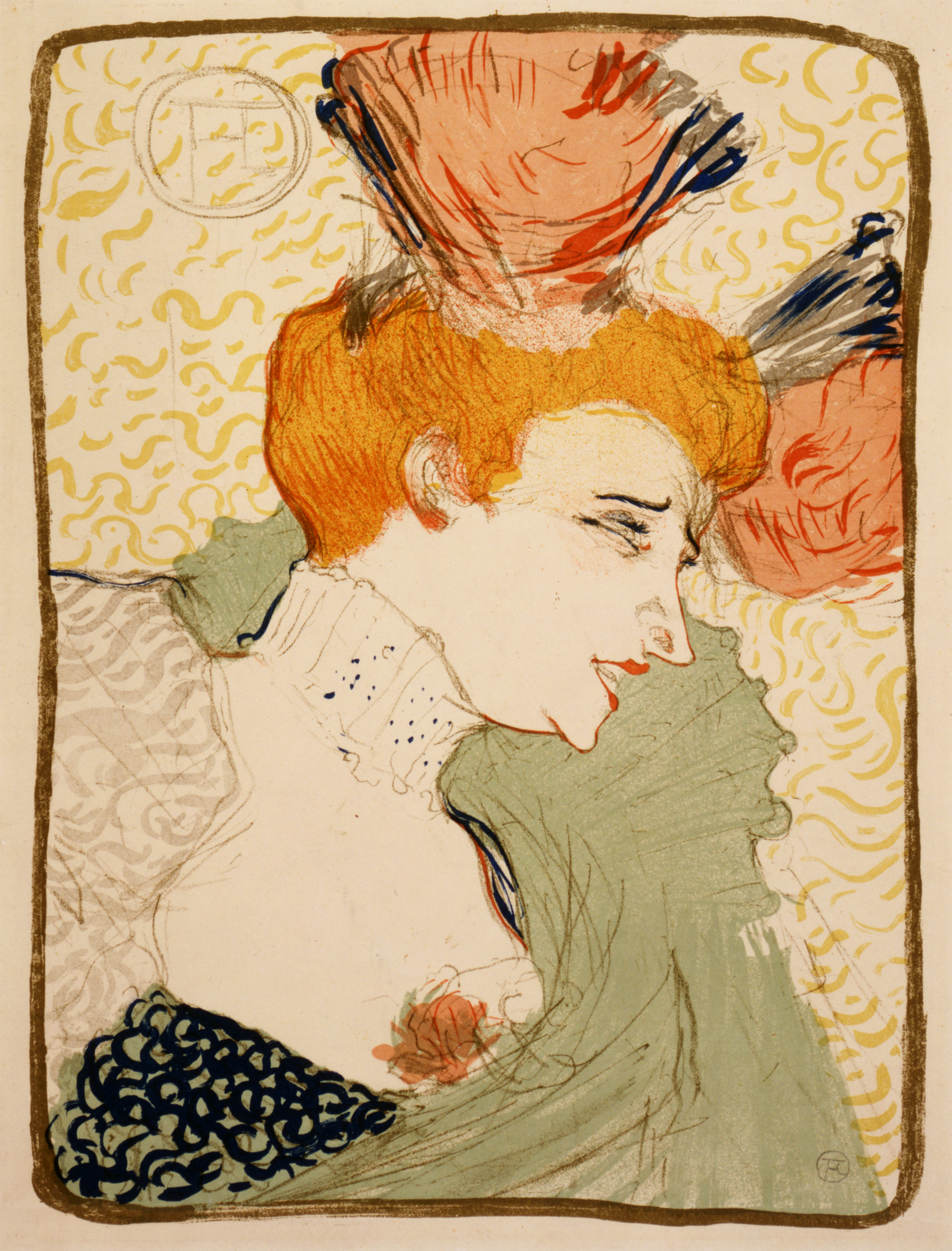
Profile of Lender by Lautrec (1895)

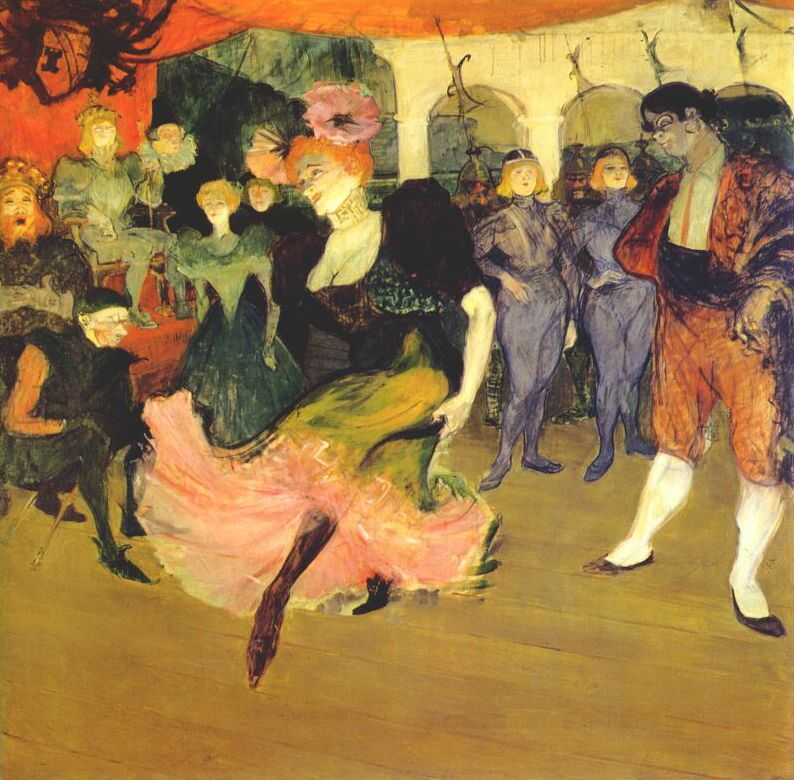
Lender by Lautrec
