= Chilpéric (operetta) =

Opéra bouffe by Hervé

Chilpéric (French pronunciation: [ʃilpeʁik]) is an opéra bouffe with libretto and music by Hervé, first produced in Paris on 24 October 1868 at the Théâtre des Folies-Dramatiques. A burlesque of the medieval, Chilpéric starred Hervé in the title role. A popular song from the piece was "Chanson du jambon", the operetta was a hit, and Hervé himself was particularly successful in the title role.

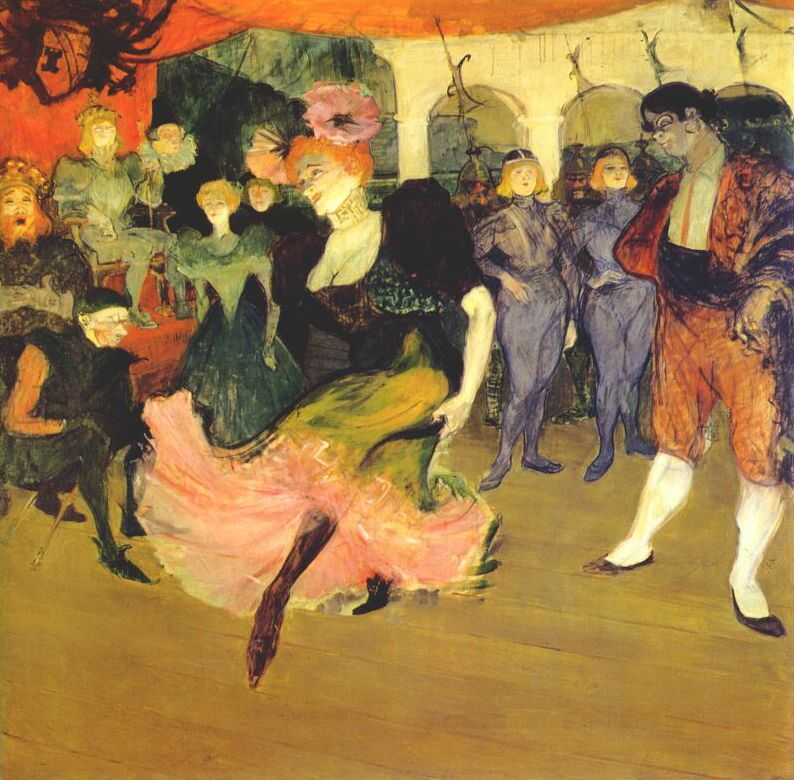
Chilpéric by Henri Toulouse-Lautrec

Revivals (some in English) were soon seen in the US, UK and Australia. During a successful revival of the operetta at the Théâtre des Variétés in Paris in 1895, Henri Toulouse-Lautrec painted Marcelle Lender performing a bolero from the operetta in his painting Chilpéric.

== Roles ==
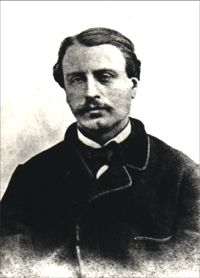
Hervé

Roles, voice types, and premiere cast
Role	Voice type	Premiere Cast, 24 October 1868 (Conductor: Moreau-Sainti)
Chilpéric, King of Soissons	tenor	Hervé
Frédégonde	soprano	Blanche d'Antigny
Landry	tenor	Mendasti
Galswinthe	contralto	Berthal
Brunehaut, Sigebert's wife	soprano	Caroline Jullien
Sigibert, brother of Chilpéric	bass	Berret
Alfred	soprano	Léontine Gouvion
Fana	mezzo-soprano	Anna Judic
Don Nervoso	tenor	Monroy
Ricin, doctor of Chilpéric	bass	Ange Milher
Grand légendaire	tenor	Chaudesaigues
Druids, priests, the king's entourage

== Background ==
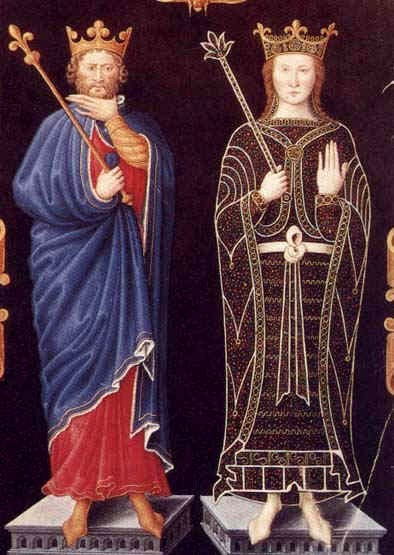
Chilperic I & Fredegunde

Hervé had written one act operettas for many years, which due to the licensing system in Paris until 1858 was all that was allowed for the theatres where his works were presented. In 1858 this restriction was removed and his first full-length opéra bouffe Les chevaliers de la Table Ronde was produced at the Théâtre des Bouffes Parisiens in 1866 with great success. This was followed by L'œil crevé ("The pierced eye") at the Théâtre des Folies-Dramatiques in 1867, also a success, so the theatre accepted a new piece by Hervé for 1868. These pieces, along with the same composer's Le petit Faust of 1869, represent burlesque - comic treatment of serious subjects, full of deliberate anachronisms and zany situations - at its most extreme.

The published libretto of Chilpéric is preceded by a foreword which says in part: "First of all let's explain our plan ... Our plan? ... Oh dear, we don't have one ... Ah! just one thing: that of making the audience laugh between our musical numbers."

The real Chilperic I was the fourth son of Clotaire I. He shared the kingdom of Soissons (561), tried to rob his brother Sigebert and kidnapped him, but was repulsed and nearly lost his lands. Husband of Galswinthe, he had her strangled to please his mistress, Fredegonde, whom he married afterwards. Fredegonde herself, as Queen, murdered Sigebert and put down his wife Brunehaut. She may have had her husband killed to prevent him finding out about her affair with a subject named Landry. All these historical personages appear in somewhat warped form in the operetta.

== Synopsis ==
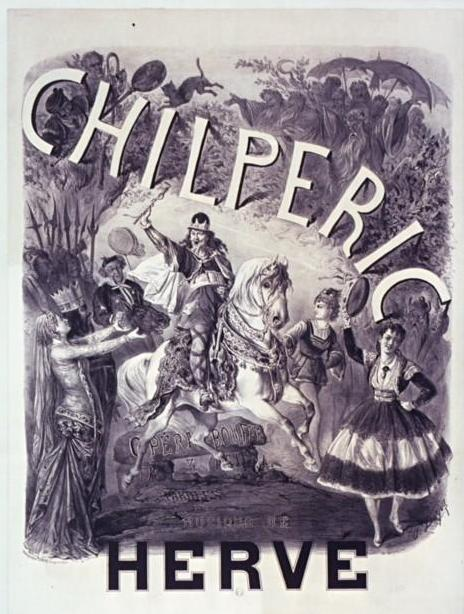
Illustration of the original production

Chilpéric is based on the story of the Merovingian king Chilperic I, who ruled from 561 to 584.

Scene - Gaul, 567.

=== Act I ===
King Chilpéric has come to the woods on horseback attended by some of his knights, also mounted, to consult with the Druids as to whether he will win success in his next battle. There he discovers Landry, a shepherd, and his fiancée Frédégonde. Chilpéric takes a fancy to Frédégonde and offers to bring her to court, giving her a job as a "laundress, etc." but actually intending to make her his mistress. Landry is also offered a job at court to serve as the King's major domo . A sudden thunderstorm produces panic in the King's and knights' horses, who bolt for shelter with their riders atop them as the Druids protect themselves from the elements with umbrellas of differing colours.

=== Act 2 ===
Chilpéric has taken Frédégonde as his mistress, which is infuriating Brunehaut, the Spanish-born wife of Chilpéric's brother Sigibert. Brunehaut had gone to a lot of trouble to arrange a marriage between the King and her sister Princess Galswinthe, her secret plan being then to murder them both and claim the throne for her husband and herself as their nearest relatives. However the marriage is still planned since it is a matter of a diplomatic alliance between Gaul and Spain. Meanwhile, Brunehaut has seduced the handsome Landry, consoling him for the loss of his sweetheart Frédégonde. It is necessary for the King to break off his relationship with Frédégonde due to his impending marriage to the Spanish princess but Frédégonde determines not to go quietly. Princess Galswinthe arrives with her attendants from Spain and is welcomed with great ceremony and festivities but Frédégonde interrupts the celebrations, shrieking in fury as she is carried into the middle of the throne room on a sedan chair, which however breaks apart and she is turned out.

=== Act 3 ===
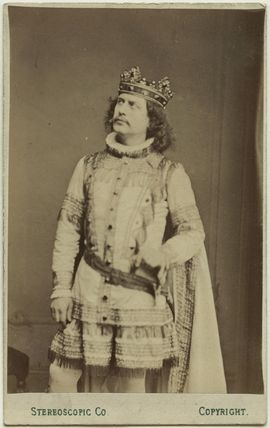
Hervé as Chilpéric

In the bridal chamber, awaiting Chilpéric and Galswinthe after their wedding, a lot of plotting is going on. Frédégonde has used her charms to persuade the Grand légendaire, a court official, to strangle Galswinthe that very night, Brunehaut talked her lover Landry into murdering his ex-sweetheart Frédégonde and Chilpéric has worked out that Brunehaut is up to no good and ordered his doctor to feed her poison.

Chilpéric is forced away from his marriage bed by an attack by his brother Sigibert's forces at the city gates. The doctor, the Grand légendaire and Landry attempt to murder Brunehaut, Galswinthe and Frédégonde respectively, in the dark in the bridal chamber but the ladies put up a stiff resistance and chaos ensues until a button is pressed and they all fall through a trap door into the dungeon (along with the bed). Chilpéric returns, victorious from his battle, rescues Galswinthe, pardons Frédégonde and does not administer any punishments beyond a few spankings to any of the other plotters.

== Reception and performance history ==
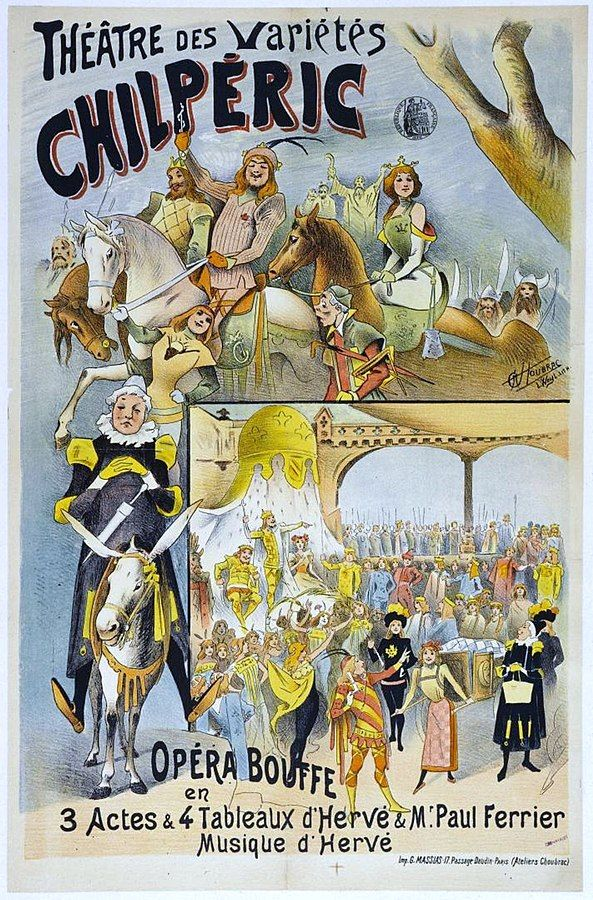
Poster by Alfred Choubrac for the 1895 revival of "Chilpéric"

Chilpéric was a success in its original production with a run of over one hundred performances. Live horses featured in the staging, Hervé in his role as the King made his entrance on horseback singing the deliberately silly "Chanson du jambon" ("Ham song"). The finale to the first act, with the orchestra depicting a thunderstorm, several horses with their riders onstage running around in panic, and a chorus of Druids singing and dancing while twirling umbrellas of varying colours, created a sensation and became famous. As well as the hilarity caused by the libretto, Hervé's vivacious and tuneful music won praise. Among other pieces, a waltz song for Frédégonde and the bolero for Galswinthe depicted in Toulouse-Lautrec's painting, are especially notable.

The then Prince of Wales attended one of the performances in the original run and remarked "What a pity that Hervé does not know English! If he came to London, he would have a huge success." This was reported to Hervé who learnt English in a few months, and accordingly the piece was mounted in London at the Lyceum Theatre in 1870 in English starring the author and Selina Dolaro. The Prince of Wales attended one of the London performances and enjoyed Hervé's performance of the "Chanson du jambon" on horseback in the first act so much that he expressed a wish that he could hear it again so Hervé came riding into the second act scene of the throne room, again on horseback, and repeated the number. The operetta had several successful productions in London, including an adaptation by H. B. Farnie at the Empire Theatre in 1884 and was given in New York in 1874, in English. It was also given in various adaptations in Australia, in Berlin and in Vienna in the 19th century. By the beginning of the 20th century however audience taste in operetta had moved away from this style of extravagant zaniness to a more bourgeois kind of work and Chilpéric was only rarely performed.

The work was revived by L'Atelier Lyrique Angevin at the Grand Théâtre d'Angers, France, in 2015.
