= Moments Musicaux =

Moments musicaux (French, 'musical moments') may refer to:

- Six moments musicaux (Schubert), 1823–1828
- Six moments musicaux (Rachmaninoff), 1896

== See also ==
- Classical music
- Suite (music)
- The Musical Moment, a musical composition by Nicolae Kirculescu
