= Baroness Lili =

1919 operetta by Jenő Huszka

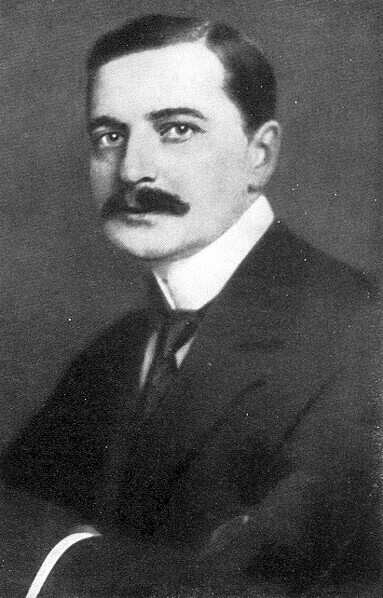
Jenő Huszka

Baroness Lili (Lili bárónő) is an operetta by Jenő Huszka in three acts. It premiered in Budapest on 7 March 1919 in the Erkel Theatre. The libretto was by Ferenc Martos. It was popular in Hungary, especially in the 1980s.

== Synopsis ==
=== Act I ===
Baron Malomszegi bought an old castle from Count Illésházy. Upon arrival, he and his daughter Lili meet the count for the first time and believe him to be a Chamberlain. The latter does not reveal who he really is because of the opportunity of being close to the pretty young girl as a member of the castle's staff.

=== Act II ===
Illésházy falls in love with Lili and enters into a closer relationship with her than a member of the staff normally would. However, neither Frédi, Lili's fiancé, nor Clarisse, Illésházy's old love, like this situation. Clarisse takes revenge on Illésházy and tells Lili that he is not a chamberlain, but the former owner of the castle. Thus, Illésházy has to leave the castle and Lili decides to marry Frédi.

=== Act III ===
Some months later, there is a horse race. The favourite is Tündér, Lili's horse. However, her rider, Baron Sanci, arrives late. Illésházy steps in to ride in his place and wins the race. He meets Lili again and convinces her that he loves her.

=== Arias ===
The best known arias are

- Cigaretta-keringő (Cigarette Waltz)
- Egy férfi képe (The face of a man), a love song
