= Nicolae Kirculescu =

Nicolae Kirculescu (December 28, 1903 – December 31, 1985) was a Romanian composer. He wrote music particularly for the stage and screen. One of his well-known works is Musical Moment for piano and orchestra, the musical theme of a Romanian television science program named Teleenciclopedia.

His compositions also include operetta, musical comedy/canzonetta and instrumental songs.

Nicolae Kirculescu was the last descendant of the Prince of Colona, Count of Coles, a family with confirmed records dating back to the year 400. Around 1920, Nicolae Kirculescu received his doctorate in law in Paris and also graduated from the Conservatory of Music in Vienna.

He made his debut as a composer in 1940 with the song "La căsuța cu zorele" and by 1963 he had composed music for 35 variety shows and more than 200 songs. Nicolae Kirculescu was married twice. He was married to Lizette Kirculescu and Marieta Bratu.
