= Prince Bob =

1902 operetta by Jenő Huszka

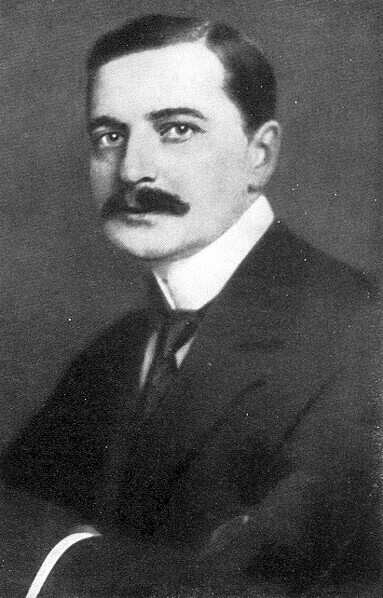
Jenő Huszka

Prince Bob (Bob herceg) is an operetta in three acts by Jenő Huszka. The libretto was written by Ferenc Martos and Károly Bakonyi.

== Performance history ==
The operetta premiered on 20 December 1902 at Népszínház in Budapest, Hungary and is considered to be Huszka's first critical success.

== Synopsis ==
The story concerns a young prince named George. However, he does not enjoy his princely duties and does not love the princess to whom he is betrothed, so he and his friend sneak out to London for some fun ("Londonban, hej"). He uses a pseudonym, Bob. In London, he meets the pretty Annie, a poor girl. She does not know that he is the prince in disguise. The story is about how George becomes king, and the romances between George and Annie and between his betrothed princess and a soldier.

== Films ==
It was filmed by László Kalmár in 1941 and produced for TV in 1972.
