= Tilos a Bemenet =

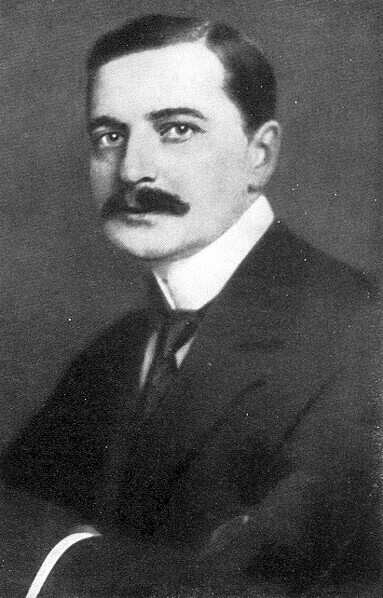
Jenő Huszka

Tilos a Bemenet (No Entry) was the first operetta by Jenő Huszka. It premiered 2 September 1899 at the Magyar theatre in Budapest, Hungary but was not a success, mainly due to the poor libretto (written by Adolf Mérei).

== Sources ==
Lamb, Andrew (2001). "Huska, Jenö". In Sadie, Stanley; Tyrrell, John (eds.). The New Grove Dictionary of Music and Musicians (2nd ed.). London: Macmillan Publishers. ISBN 978-1-56159-239-5.
