= L'œil crevé =

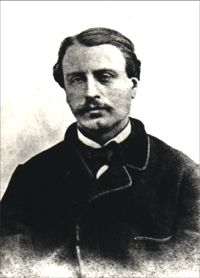
Hervé

L'œil crevé (literally "The pierced eye", more loosely "It hit me right in the eye") is an opéra bouffe with libretto and music by Hervé, first produced in Paris on 12 October 1867 at the Théâtre des Folies-Dramatiques.

== Main roles ==
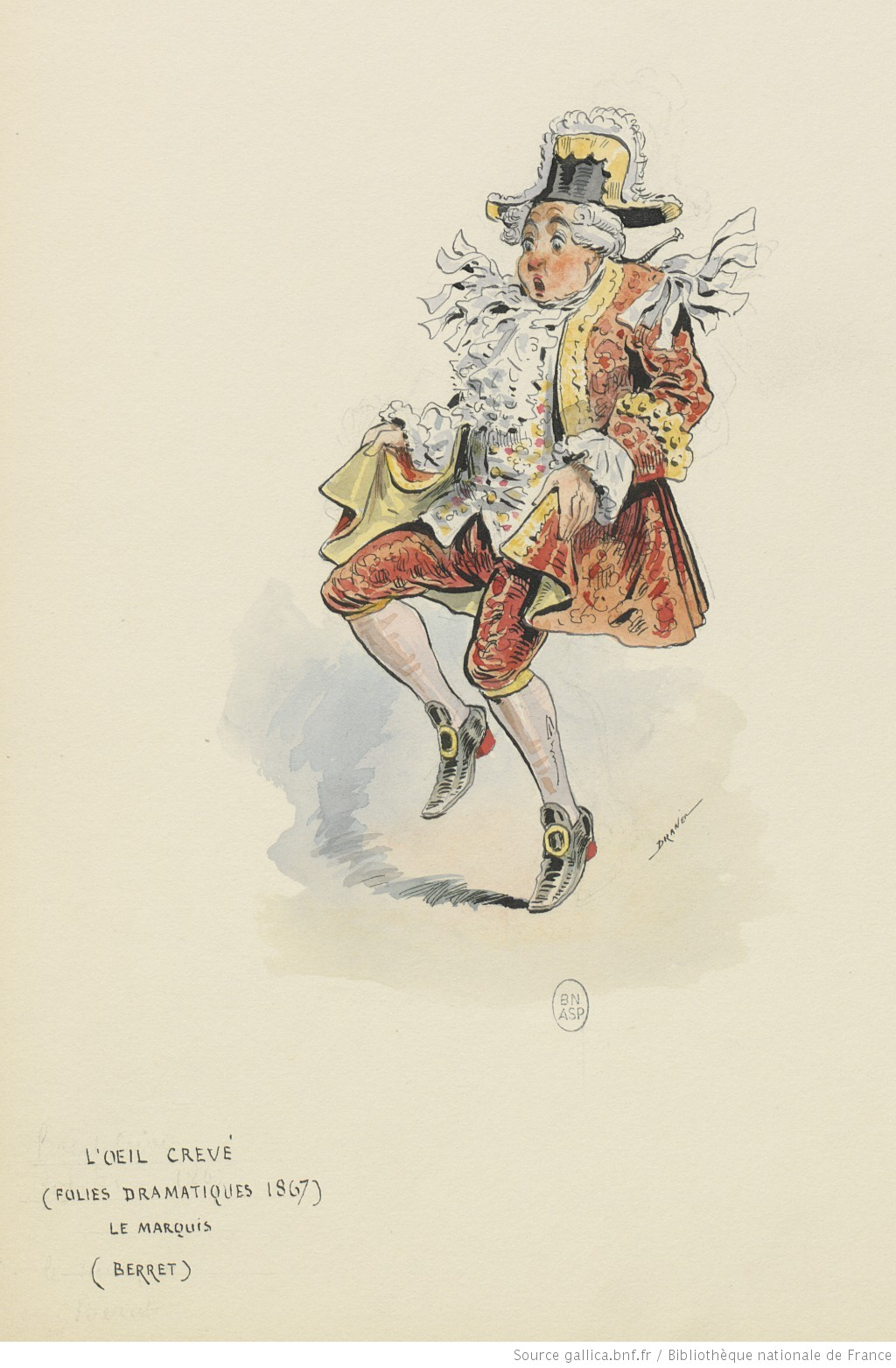
Original costume design for the Marquis

Roles, voice types, and premiere cast
Role	Premiere cast, 12 October 1867
Fleur de Noblesse	Julia Baron
The Marquis de Haut-en-Truffes, her father	Berret
The Marquise de Haut-en-Truffes, her mother	Adèle Cuinet
Ernest, a young cabinet maker
Alexandrivoire, a forester	Marcel
Dindonette, a peasant girl	Mlle Berthal
Geromé, a gendarme	Milher

== Background ==
Hervé had written one act operettas for many years, which due to the licensing system in Paris until 1858 was all that was allowed for the theatres where his works were presented. In 1858 this restriction was removed and his first full length opéra bouffe Les chevaliers de la Table Ronde was produced at the Théâtre des Bouffes Parisiens in 1866 with great success. This was followed by L’œil crevé at the Théâtre des Folies-Dramatiques in 1867. These works, along with the same composer's Chilpéric of 1868 and Le petit Faust of 1869, represent burlesque - comic treatment of serious subjects, full of deliberate anachronisms and zany situations - at its most extreme.

== Synopsis ==
Fleur de Noblesse, a young and beautiful girl from a good family, has simultaneously been smitten with a mad passion for carpentry and a mad passion for a young carpenter in the locality, Ernest. An archery contest is arranged in which her hand in marriage is to be the prize awarded to the victor, so Fleur sets to work "fixing" the targets so that Ernest will win. When the contest takes place, it does appear that Ernest has hit the bulls-eye but Alexandrivoire, a roving forester who like Robin Hood robs from the rich and gives to the poor, turns up and challenges the result. When he attempts to shoot the target however Fleur intervenes and diverts the arrow with the result that it pierces her right in the eye. The local gendarme Geromé arrests Alexandrivoire and has him thrown into a dungeon but Dindonette, a peasant girl in love with Alexandrivoire, manages to extract the arrow from Fleur's eye and, after a lot of mistaken identities, baby-talk and confusion, all ends happily.

== Reception and performance history ==
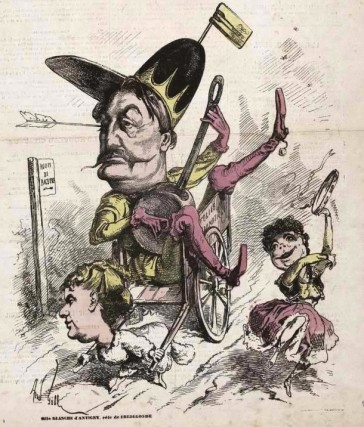
Caricature of Hervé with an arrow "right in his eye"

The operetta was a great success with 345 performances in its first year. Among the hit tunes of the lively and witty score were the duet the "Légende de la langouste atmospherique" (the story of the atmospheric lobster); a number for the gendarme imitating drum sounds; and a yodeling song for Alexandrivoire. A review of the original production said Hervé's music was "witty, joyous, really crazy, really Parisian... and wise!" Carl Maria von Weber's opera Der Freischütz and Rossini's Guillaume Tell, which both feature archery contests, are parodied, as is Verdi's Il trovatore, with Dindonette doing a take-off of the "Miserere" from that opera as her beloved is imprisoned in a dungeon.

The work had a run in London in an English version by F. C. Burnand as Hit or Miss, or All My Eye and Betty Martin in 1868, among other productions in London in the 19th century, and was also performed in various adaptations in Australia, the USA, Austria and Germany. It was performed frequently in France up to the beginning of the 20th century, however audience taste in operetta moved away from this style of extravagant zaniness to a more bourgeois kind of work and L'œil crevé became only rarely performed.

The piece was revived in a new production at the Théâtre de l'Opéra-Comique, Paris, in 1999, under its original title Vlan! dans l’oeil.

The Opéra National de Bordeaux announced a new production of the piece for January 2021, also under the title Vlan! dans l’oeil.
