= Aranyvirág =

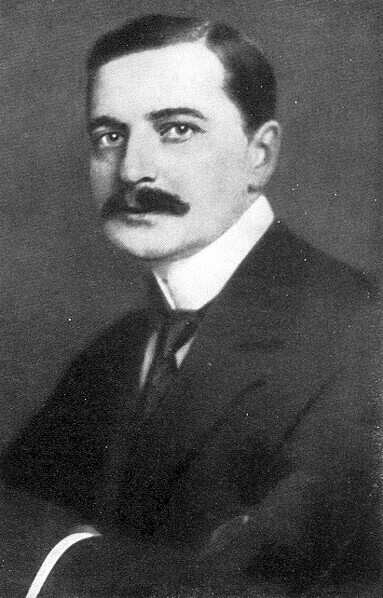
Jenő Huszka

Aranyvirág (Fioradora, perhaps; literally Gold flower) is an operetta in three acts by Jenő Huszka. It was premiered on 6 November 1903 and was the first opening performance at the Király Színház (King Theatre) in Budapest, Hungary. The libretto is by Ferenc Martos and Károly von Bakonyi.

== Plot ==
=== Act I ===
Ellen and Harry the young and rich American couple arrive at Napoli as tourists. Aranyvirág, a girl from Napoli, makes an agreement with Ellen for them to swap places for a day. Beppo, the boyfriend of Aranyvirág, accepts the idea and invites Ellen to the Marriners Festival.

=== Act II ===
At first, Aranyvirág likes the comfortable life of American tourists. But when she hears the music at the festival she begins to miss her friends. She invites them to the International Hotel and says that she is one of them, but Beppo and his friends reject her. After this shame she wants to leave, but Harry stop her and tells her that he's fallen in love with her.

=== Act III ===
Beppo is asked to go to America with Ellen and the same is asked Aranyvirág by Harry. But shortly before the departure, Ananyvirág sings a song for Beppo and wins back his heart.
