= Igo Hofstetter =

Austrian operetta composer

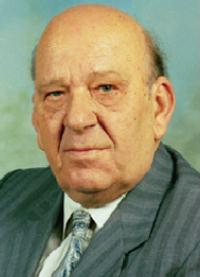
Igo Hofstetter

Igo Hofstetter (1 June 1926, in Linz – 2 March 2002, in Linz) was an Austrian operetta composer.

He became known primarily for his operettas Roulette der Herzen and Schach dem Boss and his upscale entertainment and brass music. His compositions are characterized by their distinctive rhythms.

== Career ==
He studied composition with Fritz Heinrich Klein and conducted with Louis Leschetitzky at the Anton Bruckner University in Linz.

In addition to his composing activities, he was a music teacher until his retirement in 1986. He was a board member of the International Operetta Company and Federal Council in Brucknerbund. For many years he worked as a sound engineer and a freelancer of the ORF.

The Upper Austrian Brass Band Association chose the incidental music from the operetta "Roulette der Herzen" (Arrangement for wind orchestra by Josef Hartl) in the 1995/96 season in the series of compulsory pieces level C.

The main part of his work was in the field of operetta, the upscale entertainment music and brass bands. His operettas "Roulette der Herzen", "Alles spricht von Charpillon" and "Schach dem Boss" were translated in several foreign languages and were in various theatres for several years in the repertoires.

He was a Member of Innviertler Künstlergilde.

== Selected works ==
=== Music ===
- Operettas: "Herbstliches Lied" (1953), "Das blaue Wunder" (1957/58), "Roulette der Herzen" (1963/64), "Alles spricht von Charpillon" (1967), "Schach dem Boss" (1975/76)
- Upscale entertainment and brass music: "Altmünsterer Musikanten" (March), "Am Hradschin" (Polka), "Frisch gemixt" (Charakterstück), "Helenen-Walzer", "Mein Linz" (March), "Moldau-Polka", "Oberösterreicher-Marsch", "Rohrbacher Stadtmarsch", "Rugby" (Galopp), "Vlasta" (concert polka)
- Serious music: "Mutter-Lied"
- Schlager: "Bimmel-Bammel-Bummel-Bahn", "Traurig, aber wahr" (Tango), etc.

=== Awards ===
On February 9, 1978, he was honored by Austria's Federal President with the title "Professor hc" (Professor honoris causa, an honorary professorship), and on January 27, 1983, he was honored by his hometown with the Culture Medal of Linz.

He was awarded the Cultural Medal of Upper Austria on 19 June 1996, the award of the Austrian Cross of Honour for Science and Art by the Federal President with resolution of 20 August 1999 as well as the Grand Decoration of Honour for Services to the culture of Linz on 30 October 2000.
