= Gül Baba (operetta) =

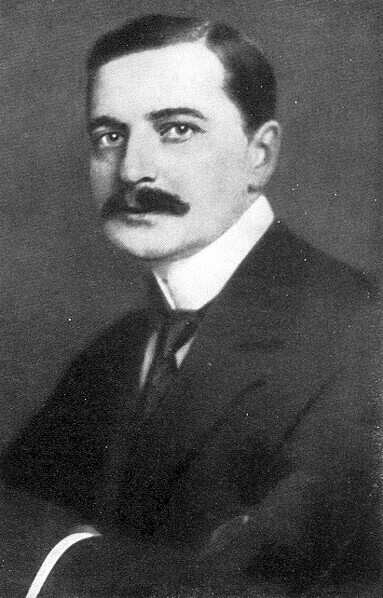
Jenő Huszka

Gül Baba is an operetta by Jenő Huszka in three acts. It was premiered on 6 December 1905 at Király Színház in Budapest, Hungary. The story is set in the 16th century Turkish invasion of Hungary. The libretto is by Ferenc Martos.

== Plot ==
=== Act I ===
Gabor falls in love with a Turkish girl, Leila. With his gypsy friend Mujko they enter a sacred garden in the mosque of Gül Baba. They take a rose for Leila. The guards of the mosque arrest him, because taking the sacred rose is a crime. The pasha Ali, who wants to marry Leila, sentences him to death. Gabor's last wish is to be with Leila in the garden until darkness.

=== Act II ===
Gül Baba finds that Gabor is a very good student and wants to save his life. He intervenes on Gabor's behalf with the pasha. The pasha agrees, but only if Leila will be his wife. Leila accepts this because she wants to save Gabor, but Gabor attacks the pasha with a knife. Now everything seems lost! Gül Baba destroys his rose garden and says to the pasha that it was done by Allah, who is angry because of the strict sentence.

=== Act III ===
The pasha Ali is afraid of Allah and gives a pardon to Gabor. Gül Baba regrets his destruction of the garden. However, Leila promises him that young couples will go for hundreds of years to his tomb to give him a rose.

== See also ==
- Gül Baba
- Tomb of Gül Baba
