= Caroline Letessier =

French actress and courtesan

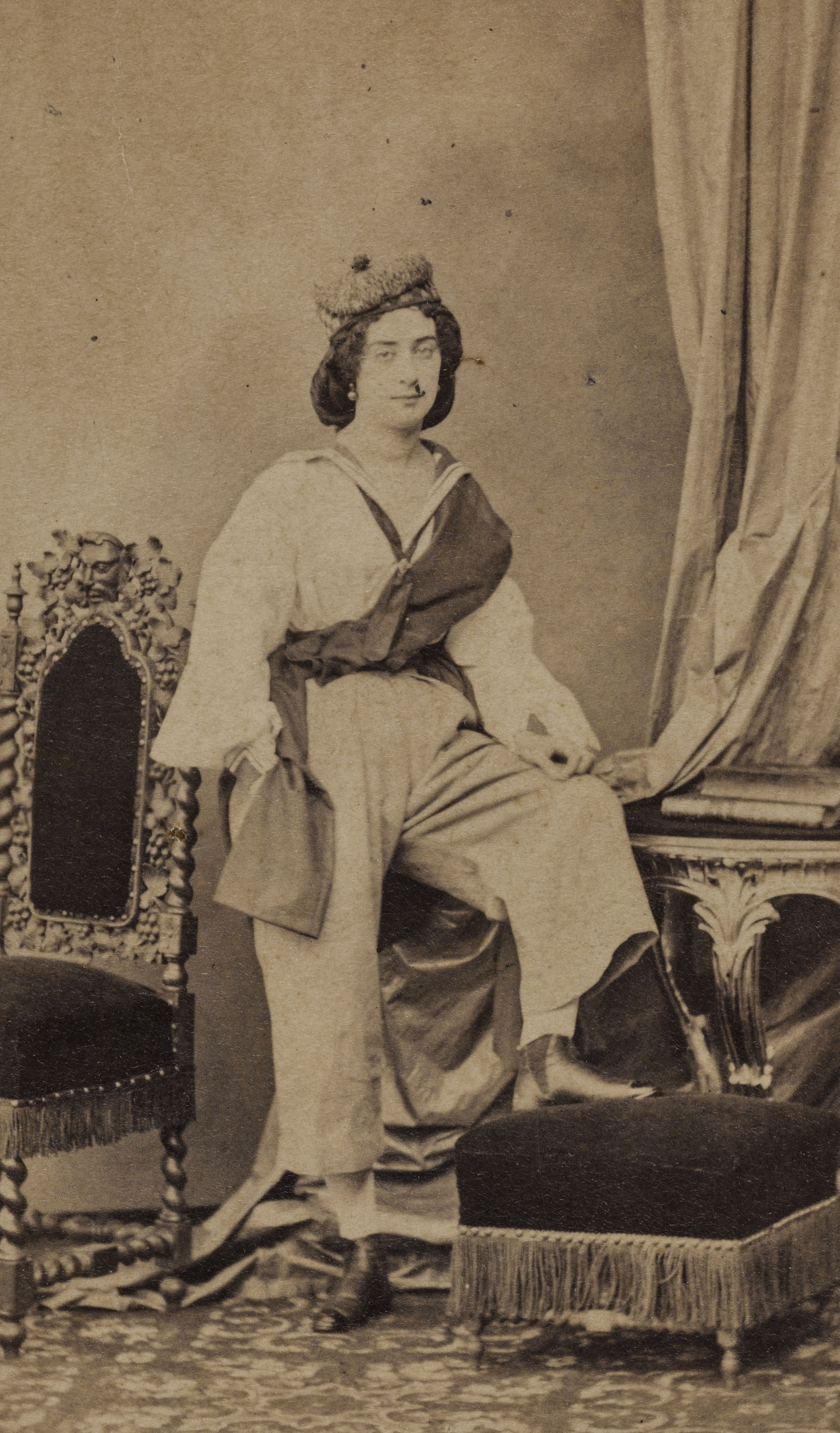
- Letessier, photographed by Charles Bergamasco (c. 1860–1890)
- Born: c. 1830; France
- Died: 1893
- Occupation(s): Actress, courtesan
- Known for: Courtesan and stage actress during the Second French Empire

Caroline Letessier (c. 1830-1893), sometimes spelled Le Tessier, was a French stage actress and courtesan during the Second French Empire. She rose to prominence in both the theatrical world and elite Parisian society. Known for her luxurious attire, dramatic flair, and high-profile relationships, Letessier epitomized the spectacle and complexity of the 19th-century demimonde. Her career spanned Paris, Saint Petersburg, and fashionable European resorts. She withdrew from public life in the 1880s, yet remained a notable cultural figure of her time.
