= Jenő Huszka =

Hungarian composer of operettas

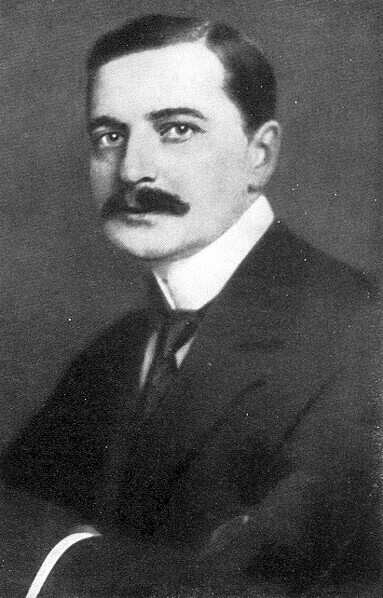
Jenő Huszka

Jenő Huszka (a.k.a. German: Eugen Huszka; 24 April 1875, Szeged – 2 February 1960, Budapest) was a Hungarian composer of operettas.

== Life ==
At the age of 5, he had his first performance – nicely played violin. He studied composition at the Academy of Music (Zeneakadémia) in Budapest. As a young man (in 1896) he was a member of the Lamoureux Orchestra in Paris. He also had to study law (this was the wish of his parents). After finishing his studies, he worked in the Ministry of Education in Budapest, in the department of art. His friend Ferenc Martos (1875–1938), a distinguished Hungarian librettist, worked in the same department and wrote all the librettos for his operettas.

The music of Jenő Huszka is considered fresh, sweet and romantic. It is inspired by Hungarian folk music and the waltzes of Vienna.

== List of works ==
(all to libretti by Ferenc Martos unless otherwise indicated)

- Tilos a bemenet (No Entry) libretto by Adolf Mérei (1899)
- Prince Bob (Bob herceg) (1902)
- Aranyvirág (Golden Flower) (1903)
- Gül Baba (1905)
- Tündérszerelem (Fairy love) 1907
- Rébusz báró (Baron Rebus) 1909
- Nemtudomka (Night-club Girl) 1914
- Baroness Lili (Lili bárónő) (1919)
- Hajtóvadászat (Riding to Hounds) 1926
- Erzsébet (Elizabeth) 1939
- Gyergyói bál (Ball at Gyergyó) 1941
- Mária fôhadnagy (Corporal Mária or Lieutenant Mary) 1942
- Szép Juhászné (Lovely Mrs Juhász) 1955
- Szabadsag, szerelem (Liberty and Love) 1955

== See also ==
- Category:Hungarian-language operas
