= The Musical Moment =

The Musical Moment, signed by the Romanian composer Nicolae Kirculescu, is a classical musical work for piano and orchestra, that was published in 1950. The premiere of the piece took place in 1965 and it is related to the adaption of the ending part of it to the opening credits of a well-known Romanian documentary show called „Teleenciclopedia” (broadcast by TVR), the show being broadcast for the first time in this same year. The 1965 recording remains a symbol for the show, this particular interpretation being made by Romanian Radio Orchestra, conducted by Iosif Conta, and the piano soloist, student at that time, Dan Grigore.

The composition was very often mistakenly labeled, due to original labeling done on the Electrorecord vinyl disc Așa începe dragostea (translating: That's how the loves starts) (containing many well-known pieces of Kirculescu). By this, the Musical moment may be found under the wrong name Patru studii de concert (in English: Four concerto studies), another work of the composer, this time for solo piano only. Other times, the tune is nicknamed „Plutașul de pe Bistrița” („The rafter of Bistrita”).

== Composition ==
The form of the musical work is done like an important dialog between the orchestra and solo instrument, respecting the following pattern: A-B_{1}-C-B_{2}. „A” and „C” being conducted by the orchestra, while the "B" noted moments are for the soloist, accompanied by the orchestra. (The recording for "Teleenciclopedia" show has only the „B_{2}” section.)

Harmonically and melodically, the scores distinguish itself by the modulation richness (Romantic style), chromatic passages, the contrast between melodic fragments build exclusively with jumps and gradually went. The best part remembered by the audience is the introductory piano section, composed on an unusual chord progression (D major chord - E$\flat$ Chord with additional sixth as musical delay of the fifth, demanding to adapt the version of major tonality, the bass being I-II_{6-5} în D major, with a Neapolitan sixth for the second step of the chord progression.

If the tempo indication of the score is firmly respected, the total time of interpretation is 7 minutes.

== Instrumentation ==
The pieces was scored for an orchestra of 40-50 players, together with the piano soloist. The following instruments are needed:

- Solo instrument: piano
- Woodwinds: 2 flutes, 2 oboes, 2 clarinets, 2 bassoons
- Brass instruments: 3 french horns, 3 trumpets, 3 trombones
- Percussion instruments: timpani, gran cassa, piatto, charleston
- String instruments: guitar and string section quintet (first violin, second violin, viola, cello and contrabass)

== Other interpretations ==
- „Teleenciclopedia” television transmission, that made the piece widely known to the television public. The starting credits of the early shows used an excerpt of the original recording. From 1990, that fragment was re-orchestrated several times for electronic instruments, the immediate noticeable difference being the piano section, the electronic piano timbre being repeatedly changed several times.
- The orchestra of the Mieluță Bibescu clarinetist recorded a short version, entitled Teleenciclopedia. It's a new slightly different interpretation of the piano solo, followed by a hybrid improvisation style of gypsy jazz, the cymbal sounds are overlapped by jazz harmonies.
- Costel Ciofu, manele singer, released his own version of the familiar fragment with lyrics this time, again under the name Teleenciclopedia. The solo piano is now transferred to his solo voice, and the lyrics are written in accordance to the prosodic pattern demanded by the melodic phrases, widely spread in jazz - vocalese genre –, previously experimented in the manele genre.

== Bibliography ==
=== Books ===
- Popescu, Mihai (1979). General repertoire of Romanian musical creation, vol. 1, Musical Publishing (in Romanian), Bucharest

=== Scores ===
- Kirculescu, Nicolae (1949). Four concerto studies for piano, State Publishing (in Romanian), Bucharest

== Discography ==
- Kirculescu, Nicolae. Așa începe dragostea , Electrecord EDC 553
