= Les Chevaliers de la Table ronde (Hervé) =

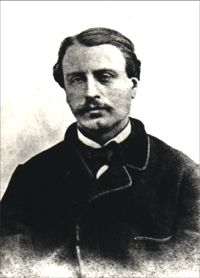
Hervé

Les Chevaliers de la table ronde is an operetta by Hervé to a libretto by Henri Chivot and Alfred Duru. The work had its first performance in 1866 at the Théâtre des Bouffes-Parisiens. It was the composer's first attempt at a full-length opéra bouffe. The burlesque plot is barely connected with Arthurian legend but rather presents a fantasy vision of a magical age of chivalry. Hervé and his librettists created a rich ensemble piece with a large number of supporting roles including four ludicrous knights and parts for women including Mélusine, Totoche and Angélique who parody the stereotypical "female" traits of sensuality, love, jealousy and greed. In contrast, Merlin, Rodomont, and Roland portray a watered-down version of knightly derring-do.

The music mixes accessible melody, zany virtuosity for the soloists, parody of "serious" classical music and opera, and vital, energetic rhythms.

The operetta was revived in 2015 by the company Les Brigands and performed November 2015 at the Opéra National de Bordeaux, followed by a 15 city tour.
