= Hervé (composer) =

French singer, composer, librettist, conductor and scene painter (1825–1892)

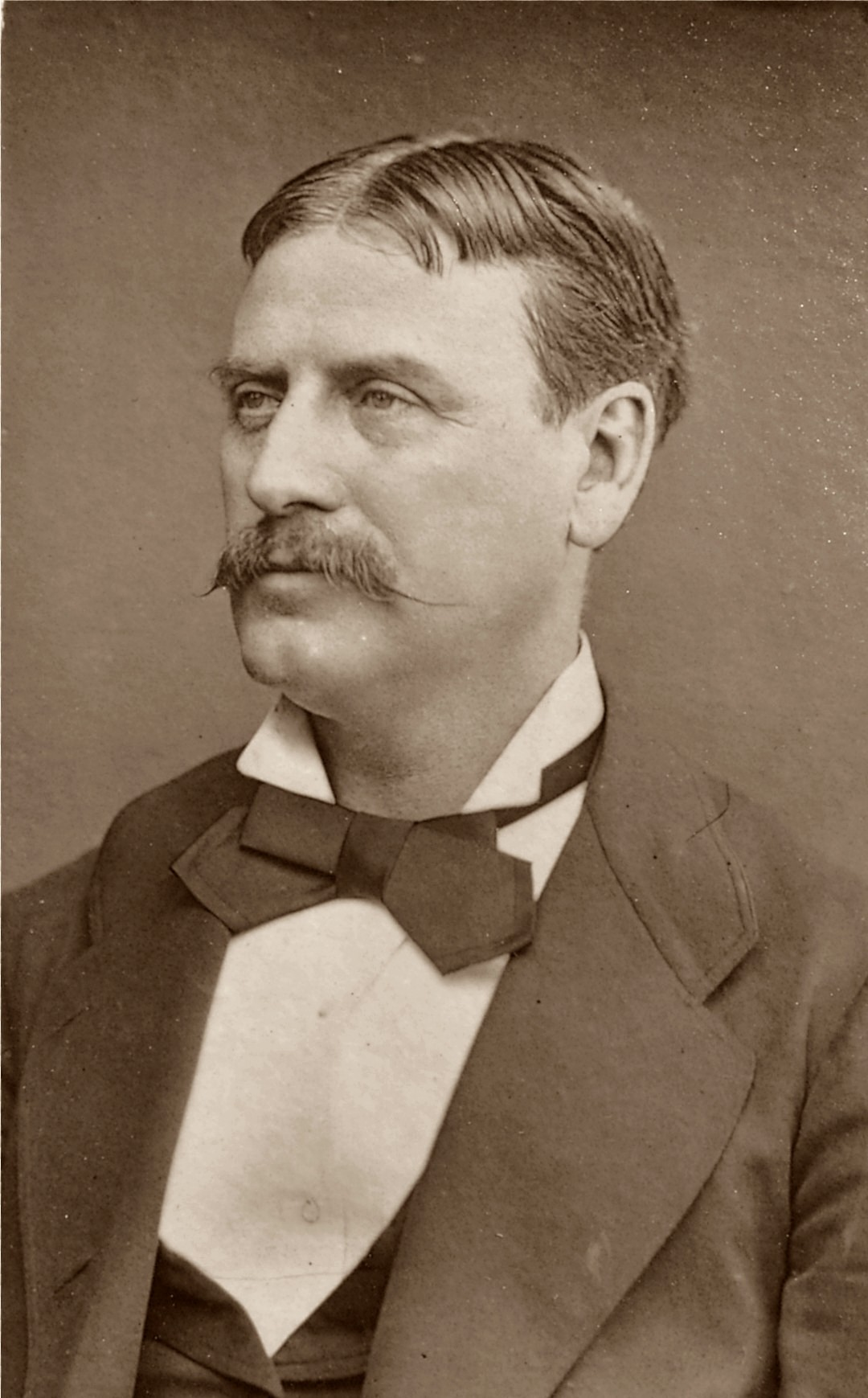
- A woodburytype of Hervé
- Born: Louis-Auguste Florimond Ronger; 30 June 1825; Houdain, Hauts-de-France, France
- Died: 3 November 1892 (aged 67); Paris, France
- Education: École Royale de Musique
- Occupations: Singer; composer; librettist; conductor; scene painter
- Years active: 1840s–1892
- Employers: Bicêtre Hospital; Church of Saint-Eustache; Théâtre du Palais Royal; Folies-Concertantes
- Notable work: Mam'zelle Nitouche (1883)
- Style: Operetta

Louis-Auguste Florimond Ronger (30 June 1825 – 3 November 1892), who used the pseudonym Hervé (French pronunciation: [ɛʁve]), was a French singer, composer, librettist, conductor and scene painter, whom Ernest Newman, following Reynaldo Hahn, credited with inventing the genre of operetta in Paris.

== Life ==
Hervé was born in Houdain near Arras. Part Spanish by birth, he became a choirboy at the Church of Saint-Roch, Paris. His musical promise was noted, and he was enrolled in the Conservatoire and studied with Daniel Auber, and by the age of fifteen was serving as organist at Bicêtre Hospital and a stage vocalist in provincial theatres, where he trained his fine tenor voice. He won a competition in 1845 for the prestigious Paris post of organist at the Church of Saint-Eustache, while he doubled with his theatrical music career, a situation that he turned to advantage years later, in his most famous work, Mam'zelle Nitouche.

Before he became musical director of the Théâtre du Palais Royal in 1851, he composed a one-act tableau grotesque, a burlesque on Don Quixote titled Don Quichotte et Sancho Pança. It was conceived as a vehicle for the actor Desiré, who was short and plump, accompanied by the tall and gangling Hervé, as he was now calling himself, in order to distance his two personas. It was staged at Adolphe Adam's Opéra-National, and achieved a great success in 1848, in spite of the distracting revolution; furthermore, according to the composer Reynaldo Hahn, the farcical pot-pourri was "simply the first French operetta". He had also composed musical entertainments to keep the patients entertained at the Bicêtre Hospital, and these gained the notice of producers.

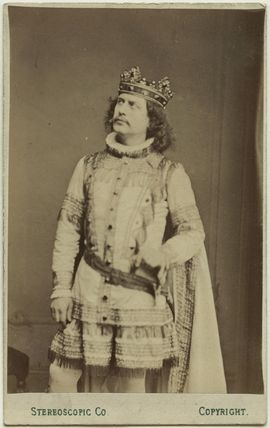
Herve as Chilpéric, King of Soissons, from his opera of the same name, 1870

Thus, Hervé was the founder of a new era of French operettas. Through his Folies-Concertantes, a small theater stage he took over in 1854 and for which he wrote many works, he became the forerunner of the Théâtre des Bouffes Parisiens of Jacques Offenbach, whose early efforts he produced at his theatre, renovated as the Folies-Nouvelles. Many of Hervé's early one act pieces are topical skits satirizing current events and were never revived. The restrictive license of the Folies-Concertantes permitted only spectacles-concerts, with no more than two characters, in a single act, stringencies imposed on Offenbach as well, but which encouraged Hervé to experiment with genres, before more flexible rules were established in the following decade. A jealous rivalry soon developed between Hervé and Offenbach, which was only patched up in 1878, when Hervé sang in a revival of Offenbach's Orphée aux enfers.

He died in Paris at the age of 67.

Since 2015, a number of his works have been revived by Palazzetto Bru Zane in tours of France and Italy.

== Works ==
A 1868 caricature of Hervé as Chilpéric by Achille Lemot

Hervé wrote more than a hundred and twenty operettas, among which were:

- Les folies dramatiques (1853), with two other librettists, which parodied all the forms of entertainment in Paris, comedy, tragedy, vaudeville, ballet and opera.
- Les chevaliers de la Table Ronde (Bouffes Parisiens, 17 November 1866)
- L'œil crevé (Folies-Dramatiques, 12 October 1867)
- Chilpéric (1868)
- Le petit Faust (1869)
- Les Turcs (1869)
- Le trône d'Écosse (1871)
- La veuve du Malabar (1873)
- La belle poule (1875)
- La roussotte (with Charles Lecocq and Marius Boullard, Théâtre des Variétés, 1881)
- Lili (1882)
- Mam'zelle Nitouche (1883)
