= Le petit Faust =

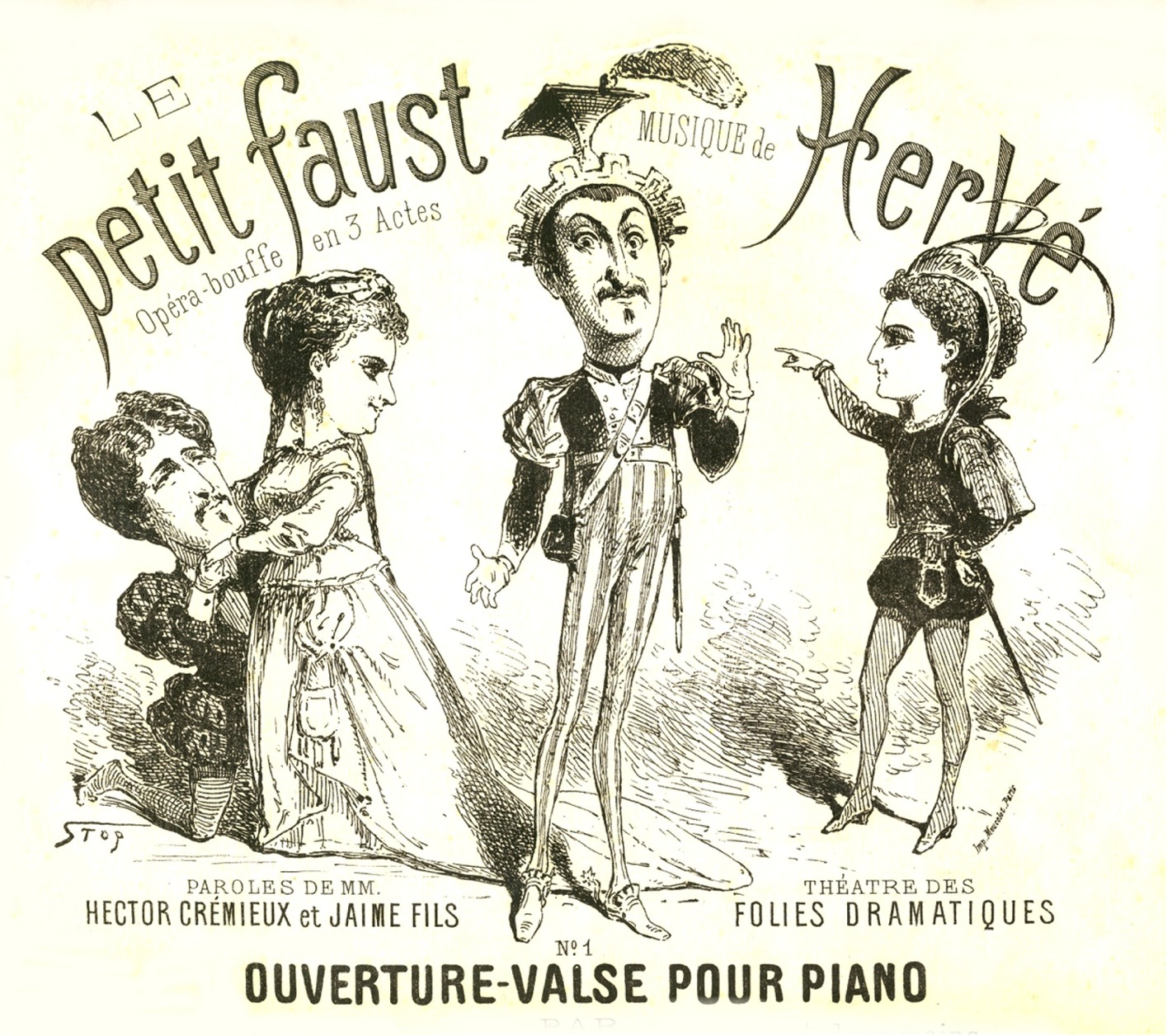
The main performers in the premiere of Le petit Faust

Le petit Faust is an opéra bouffe in four acts which burlesques the drama Faust by Goethe and the opera of the same name by Gounod. The music of the piece is by Hervé, with a text by Hector-Jonathan Crémieux and Adolphe Jaime. The work had its premiere in Paris at the Théâtre des Folies-Dramatiques on 23 April 1869.

== Background ==
Gounod's opera Faust, loosely based on episodes from Goethe's drama, had first appeared in Paris in 1859 and had achieved great popularity. Hervé had produced a number of successful operettas and with this work he and his librettists took the story and added zany comic twists to it.

== Main roles ==
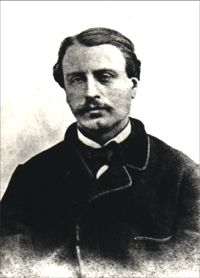
Hervé

Roles, voice types, and premiere cast
Role	Premiere cast, 23 April 1869 (Conductor: Thibault)
Mephisto (trousers role)	Anna Van Ghell
Marguerite	Blanche d'Antigny
Faust	Hervé (the composer)
Valentin, Marguerite's brother	M.Milher

== Synopsis ==
=== Act 1 ===
Dr. Faust's schoolroom

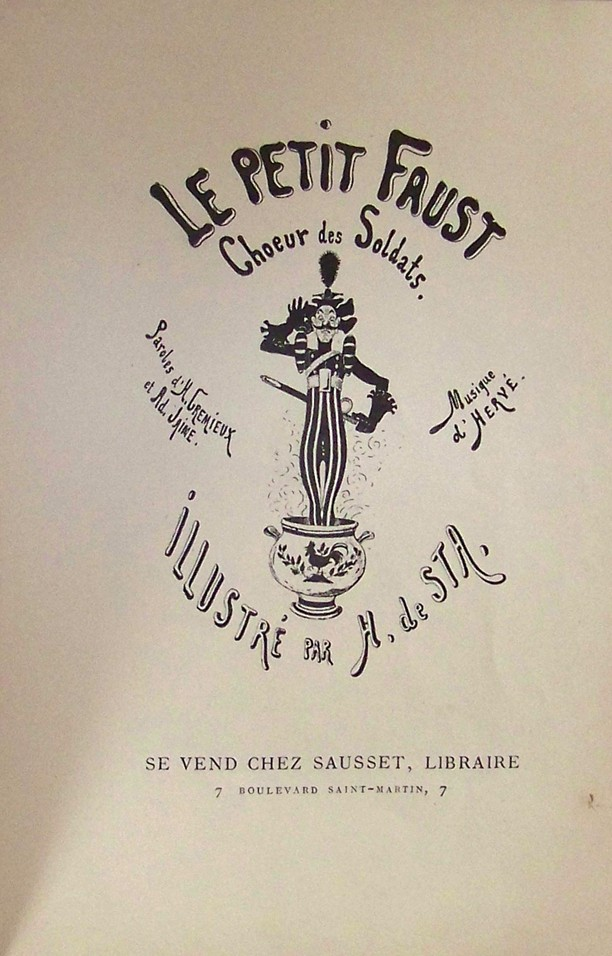
Illustration par Henry de Sta

Dr. Faust, an elderly professor at a boarding school, is experiencing great difficulty in keeping his unruly students including Siébel in order. The students pass naughty notes to each other and cover their course work with obscene drawings but use their physical charms to avoid punishment. Valentin enters with other soldiers- he is about to go to war and has brought his sister Marguerite to the school so she can stay there in his absence. Dr. Faust, drawn to Marguerite's supposed innocence and her beauty, accepts her as a student even though she is over school age. Mephisto, the devil, appears to Faust and offers him youth, good looks and wealth in exchange for his powers of reasoning - not his soul, as in Goethe and Gounod, for as the devil says in this version "Everyone sells that these days without even signing a contract". Marguerite, meanwhile, not as pure and innocent as all that, has run away from the school to go to London to teach the British how to dance the can-can. Faust, now young and rich, in love and not knowing where Marguerite has gone, determines to search the world to find her again, vowing to be hers forever.

=== Act 2 ===
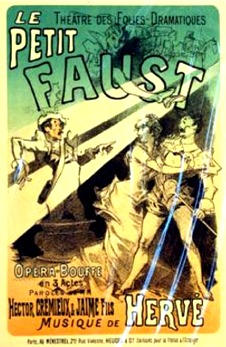
Le petit Faust, sheet music cover

A nightclub

Students, pleasure-seekers, and the demimonde are enjoying a night out, dancing and drinking and having fun. Faust enters, tired of a life of empty pleasure and seeking Marguerite. Mephisto has let it be known that Faust has a vast fortune to bestow on Marguerite, and girls claiming to be Marguerite appear from Japan, Italy, France and all over the world, but Faust rejects them all as fake. However, the real Marguerite does turn up at the club, back from teaching the English how to dance the can-can, and Faust is appalled to find such an "innocent" girl in these seedy surroundings. He is about to whisk her away in his carriage when her brother Valentin appears, back from the war, and is enraged to find Faust attempting to make her his lover. Valentin and Faust fight a duel, and aided by Mephisto, Faust kills Valentin and takes Marguerite away.

=== Act 3 ===
Marguerite's bedroom

Marguerite is waiting for Faust to appear, but is having trouble remembering his name, as she relives the pleasure she has experienced with a number of past lovers, one in particular called Adolphe. Faust comes in and Marguerite tries to give him some idea of her past life, praying to God for forgiveness. About to have supper, Marguerite and Faust are startled by the ghost of Valentin appearing in the soup tureen. The ghost of Marguerite's brother informs her that Faust's huge wealth comes from the devil but she doesn't care. Valentin's ghost also informs her that Faust, in order to be worthy of her, has given all his money to the poor and Faust confirms this, whereupon Marguerite bitterly denounces Faust for killing her brother and declares she wants nothing further to do with him.

=== Act 4 ===
Walpurgis Night

Witches, demons, ghouls and assorted spirits celebrate. Mephisto condemns Faust to fulfill his vow to be with the reluctant Marguerite forever, but her brother Valentin's soul is redeemed and goes to heaven.

== Reception and performance history ==
Le petit Faust was praised by contemporary critics for its lively and elegant music and ran for over 200 consecutive performances in its first run. The work was given productions in London and other European cities and revived frequently in France throughout the 19th century. It was produced by Alice Oates on Broadway in New York city in 1870 in an English version by Henry B. Farnie under the title Little Faust! A revival in Paris in 1935 featured Fanély Revoil as Mephisto. Recent productions include performances in 2015 at the Staatstheater am Gärtnerplatz, Munich. The Opéra de Marseille performed a new production of the piece beginning in March 2019.
