= Operetta =

Genre of light opera

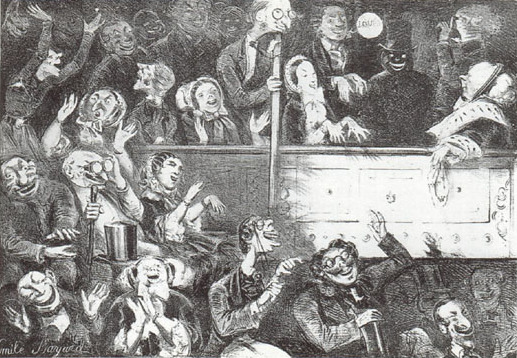
The audience at the Théâtre des Bouffes-Parisiens, the birthplace of Jacques Offenbach's operettas. Caricature of 1860 by Émile Bayard.

Operetta is a form of theatre and a genre of light opera. It includes spoken dialogue, songs, and dances. It is lighter than opera in terms of its music, orchestral size, and length of the work. Apart from its shorter length, the operetta is usually of a light and amusing character. The subject matter may portray "lovers' spats, mistaken identities, sudden reversals of fortune, and glittering parties". It sometimes also includes satirical commentaries.

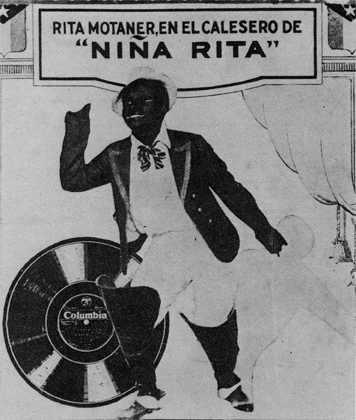
A Columbia Records advertisement for a recording of Rita Montaner in a production of Eliseo Grenet and Ernesto Lecuona's Niña Rita, o, La Habana en 1830, an operetta from the Spanish genre of zarzuela

"Operetta" is the Italian diminutive of "opera" and was used originally to describe a shorter, perhaps less ambitious work than an opera. Operetta provides an alternative to operatic performances in an accessible form targeting a different audience. Operetta became a recognizable form in the mid-19th century in France, and its popularity led to the development of many national styles of operetta. Distinctive styles emerged across countries including Austria-Hungary, Germany, England, Spain, the Philippines, Mexico, Cuba, and the United States. Through the transfer of operetta among different countries, cultural cosmopolitanism emerged in the previous century. Operetta as a genre lost favor in the 1930s and gave way to modern musical theatre. Important operetta composers include Johann Strauss, Jacques Offenbach, Franz Lehár, and Francisco Alonso.

== Definitions ==
The term operetta arises in the mid-eighteenth-century Italy and it is first acknowledged as an independent genre in Paris around 1850. Castil-Blaze's Dictionnaire de la musique moderne claims that this term has a long history and that Mozart was one of the first people to use the word operetta, disparagingly, describing operettas as "certain dramatic abortions, those miniature compositions in which one finds only cold songs and couplets from vaudeville". The definition of operetta has changed over the centuries and ranges depending on each country's history with the genre. It is often used to refer to pieces that resemble the one-act compositions by Offenbach in contrast with his full length compositions, 'opéra-bouffe'. Offenbach invented this art form in response to the French government's oppressive laws surrounding the stagings of works that were larger than one act or contained more than four characters.

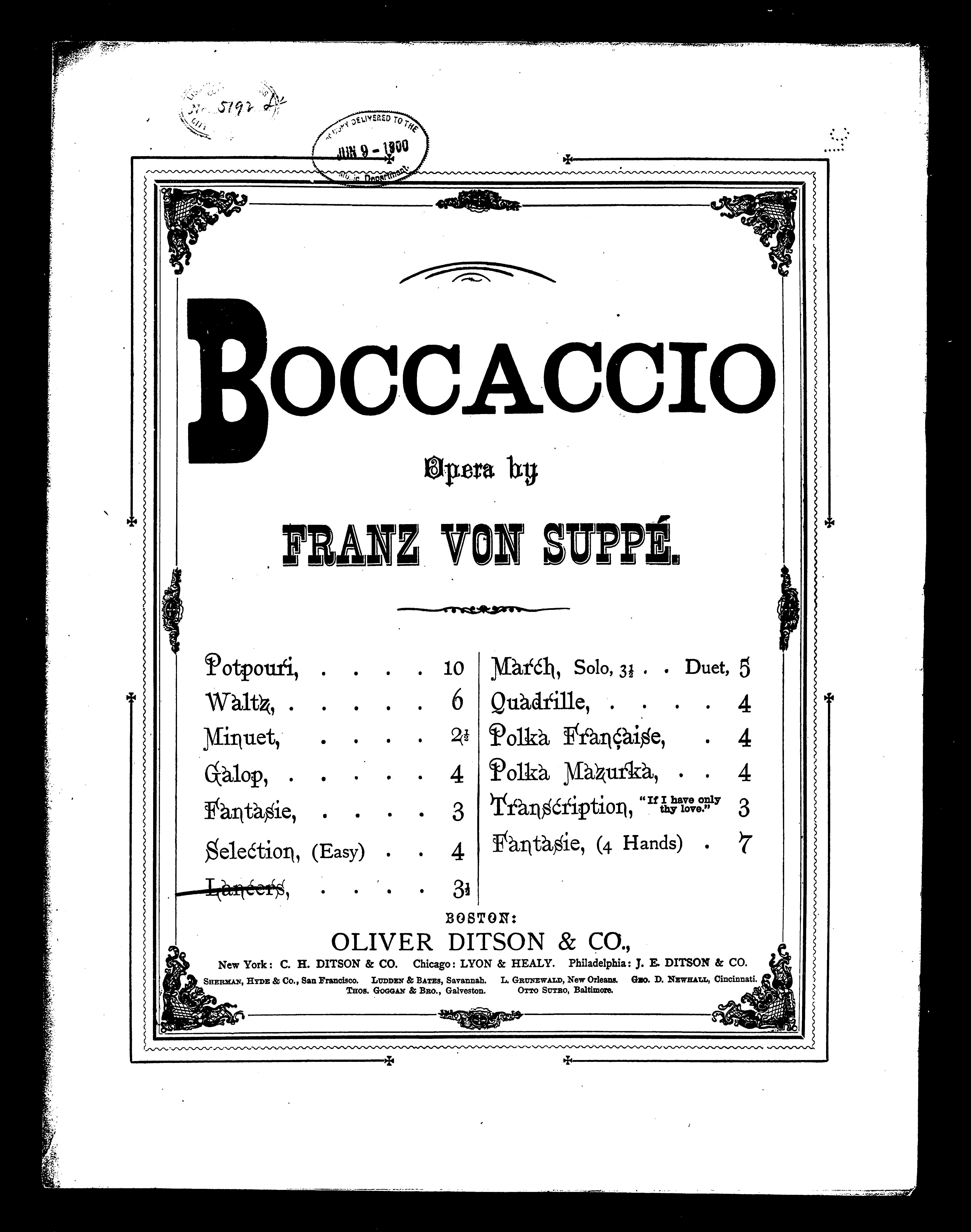
Cover page of Boccaccio, oder Der Prinz von Palermo (Boccaccio, or the Prince of Palermo) by Franz von Suppé in 1879. An example of early Viennese operetta.

== History ==
Operetta became recognized as a musical genre around 1850 in Paris. In 1870, the centre for operetta shifted to Vienna when Paris fell to the Prussians. The form of operetta continued to evolve through the First World War.

There are some common characteristics among operettas that flourished from the mid-1850s through the early 1900s, beginning with the French opéra-bouffe. They contain spoken dialogue interspersed between musical numbers, and often the principal characters, as well as the chorus, are called upon to dance, although the music is largely derived from 19th-century operatic styles, with an emphasis on singable melodies. Operetta in the twentieth century is more complex and reached its pinnacle in Austria and Germany.

Operetta is a precursor of the modern musical theatre or the "musical". In the early decades of the 20th century, operetta continued to exist alongside the newer musicals, with each influencing the other. The distinctive traits of operetta are found in the musical theatre works of Jerome Kern, Richard Rodgers and Stephen Sondheim.

== Operetta in French ==
=== Origins ===
Operetta was first created in Paris, France in the middle of the 19th century in order to satisfy a need for short, light works in contrast to the full-length entertainment of the increasingly serious opéra comique. By this time, the "comique" part of the genre name had become misleading: Georges Bizet's Carmen (1875) is an example of an opéra comique with a tragic plot. The definition of "comique" meant something closer to "humanistic", meant to portray "real life" in a more realistic way, representing tragedy and comedy next to each other, as Shakespeare had done centuries earlier. With this new connotation, opéra comique had dominated the French operatic stage since the decline of tragédie lyrique. The origins of French operetta began when comic actors would perform dances and songs to crowds of people at fairs on open-air stages. In the beginning of the 18th century these actors began to perform comic parodies of known operas. These performances formed operetta as a casual genre derived from opéra comique, while returning to a simpler form of music. Many scholars have debated as to which composer should be credited as the inventor of operetta; Jaques Offenbach or Hervé. It is concluded that Hervé completed the groundwork, and Offenbach refined and developed the art form into the concept of operetta as we know it today. Therefore, "Offenbach is considered the father of French operetta – but so is Hervé."

=== Notable composers ===
Playbill for a revival of Orphée aux enfers

Hervé was a singer, composer, librettist, conductor, and scene painter. In 1842, he wrote the one act opérette, L'Ours et le pacha, based on the popular vaudeville by Eugène Scribe and X. B. Saintine. In 1848, Hervé made his first notable appearance on the Parisian stage, with Don Quichotte et Sancho Pança (after Cervantes), which can be considered the starting point for the new French musical theatre tradition. Hervé's most famous works are the Gounod parody Le petit Faust (1869) and Mam'zelle Nitouche (1883).

Jacques Offenbach is most responsible for the development and popularization of operetta—also called opéras bouffes or opérettes—giving it its enormous vogue during the Second Empire and afterwards. In 1849, Offenbach obtained permission to open the Théâtre des Bouffes Parisiens, a theatre company that offered programs of two or three satirical one-act sketches. The company was so successful that it led to the elongation of these sketches into an evening's duration. However, Offenbach's productions were bound by the police prefecture in Paris, which specified the type of performance that would be allowed: "pantomimes with at most five performers, one-act comic musical dialogues for two to three actors, and dance routines with no more than five dancers; choruses were strictly forbidden." These rules defined what came to be defined as operetta: "a small unpretentious operatic work that had no tragic implications and was designed to entertain the public". Two other French composers, Robert Planquette and Charles Lecocq, followed Offenbach's model and wrote the operettas Les Cloches de Corneville (The Bells of Normandy) and La Fille de Madame Angot (The Daughter of Madame Angot). The two operettas were considered a major hit.

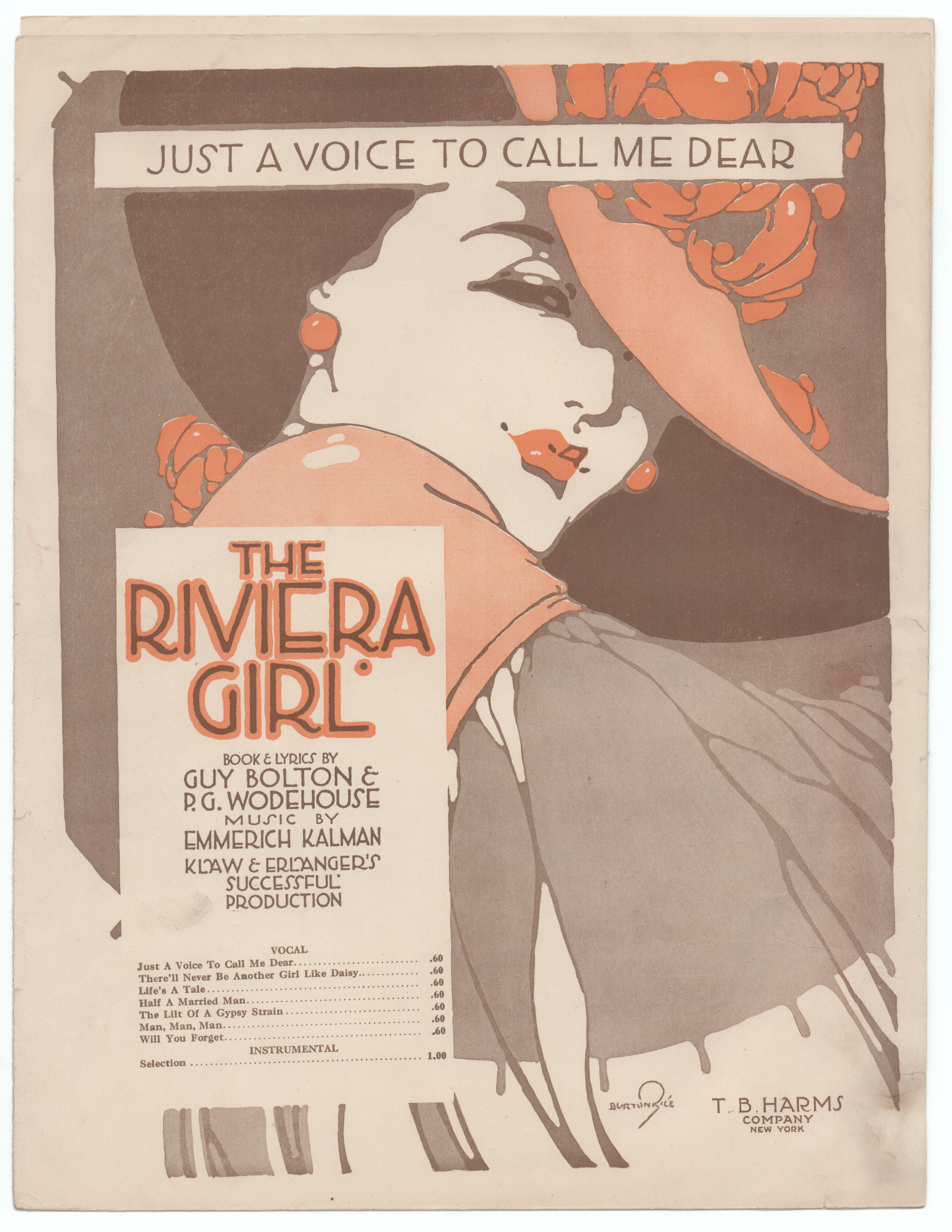
One of the most well-known operettas of famous Hungarian playwright Emmerich Kálmán is the Csárdáskirálynő ("Czardas Queen"). It was played at Broadway, by the name 'Riviera Girl'.

The political limitations placed on Offenbach and Parisian theatre were gradually lifted, and operetta gained wide popularity. While Offenbach's earliest one-act pieces included Les deux aveugles, Le violoneux and Ba-ta-clan (all 1855) did well, his first full-length operetta, Orphée aux enfers (1858), was by far the most successful. It became the first repertory operetta and was staged hundreds of times across Europe and beyond. Offenbach's legacy is seen in operettas throughout the late 19th century and beyond by encouraging Strauss the Younger to bring the genre to Austria-Hungary. Offenbach also traveled to the US and England educating musicians on the more than 100 operettas he wrote during his lifetime. This international travel resulted in the appearance of strong national schools in both nations. By the 1870s, however, Offenbach's popularity declined. The public showed more interest in romantic operettas that showed the "grace and refinement" of the late Romantic period. This included Messager's operetta Véronique and Louis Ganne's Les saltimbanques. The 20th century found French operetta even more out of favor as the international public turned to Anglo-American and Viennese operettas, which continued to develop the art form into the late Romantic era.

== Operetta in German and Hungarian ==
Offenbach was unabashed about spreading operetta around the continent. In 1861, he staged some of his recent works at the Carltheater in Vienna, which paved the way for Austrian and German composers. Soon, Vienna became the epicenter of operetta productions. It is because of the Viennese operetta, not the French, that the term is used to describe a full-length work. Additionally, after the Prussian defeat in 1866, operetta became the sign of a new age in Austria, marked by modernity and industrialization.

=== Austria–Hungary ===
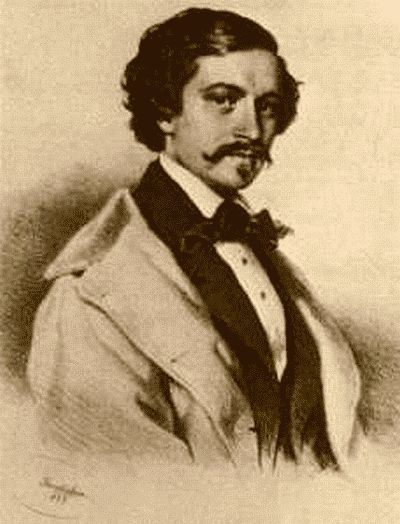
Johann Strauss II

The most significant composer of operetta in the German language was the Austrian Johann Strauss II (1825–1899). Strauss was recruited from the dance hall and introduced a distinct Viennese style to the genre. Strauss was highly influenced by the work of Offenbach, so much so that he collaborated with many of Offenbach's librettists for his most popular works. His operetta, Die Fledermaus (1874), became the most performed operetta in the world, and remains his most popular stage work. In all, Strauss wrote 16 operettas and one opera, most with great success when first premiered.

Strauss's satire was often generic, unlike Offenbach who commented on real-life matters.

Strauss's operettas, waltzes, polkas, and marches often have a strongly Viennese style, and his popularity causes many to think of him as the national composer of Austria. The Theater an der Wien never failed to draw huge crowds when his stage works were first performed. After many of the numbers the audience would call noisily for encores.

Franz von Suppé, also known as Francesco Ezechiele Ermenegildo, Cavaliere Suppé-Demelli, was born in 1819 and his fame rivals that of Offenbach. Suppé was a leading composer and conductor in Vienna and most known for his operetta Leichte Kavallerie (1866), Fatinitza (1876), and Boccaccio (1879). Suppé was a contemporary to Strauss and composed over 30 operettas 180 farces, ballets and other stage works. Recently, though most of his works have been fallen into obscurity, many of them have been reprised within films, cartoons, advertisements and so on. Both Strauss and Suppé are considered to be the most notable composers of the Golden Age of Viennese operetta.

Following the death of Johann Strauss and his contemporary, Franz von Suppé, Franz Lehár was the heir apparent. Lehar is widely considered the leading operetta composer of the 20th century and his most successful operetta, Die lustige Witwe (The Merry Widow), is one of the classic operettas still in repertory.

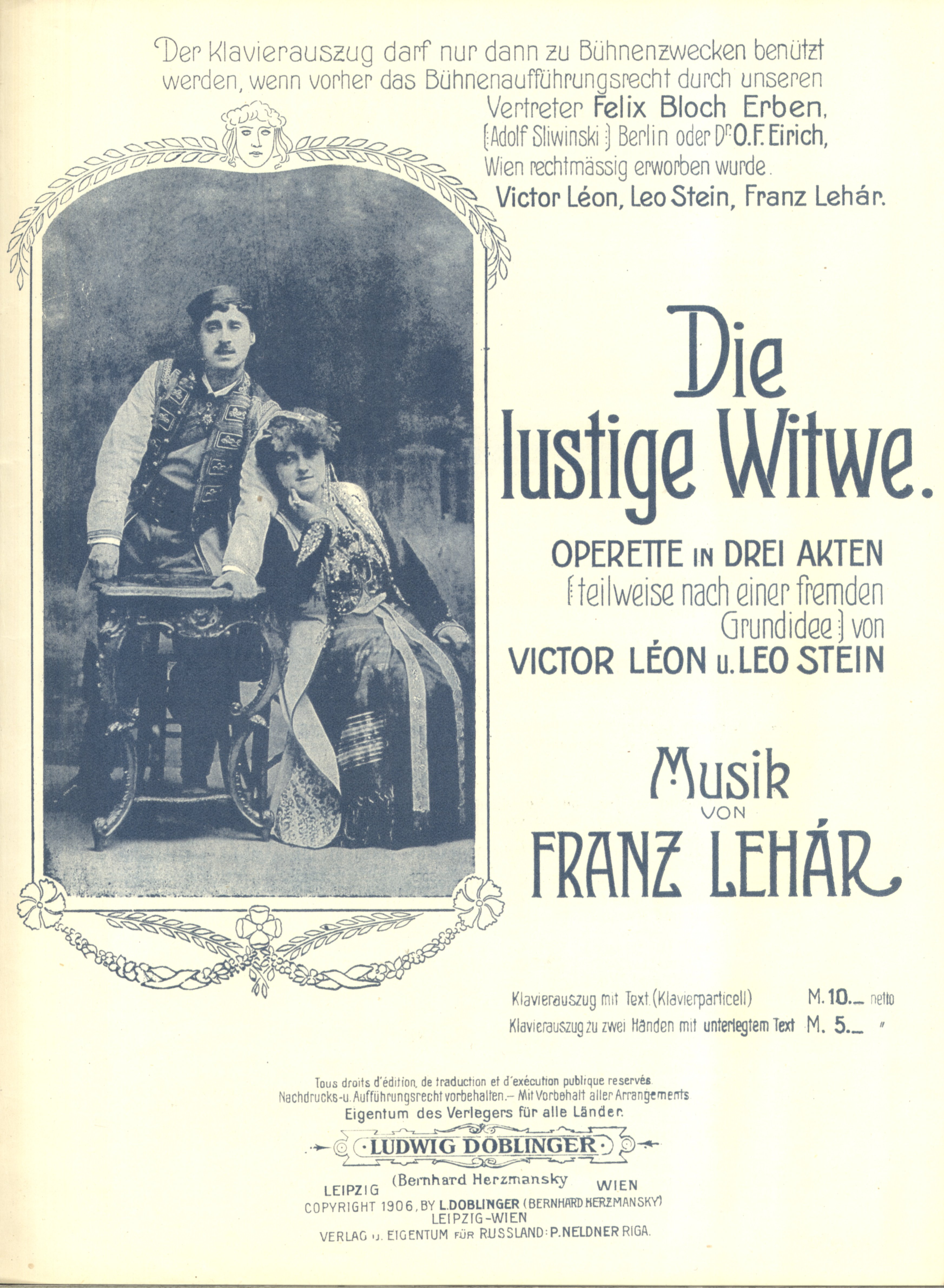
Die lustige Witwe (The Merry Widow) poster by Franz Lehár

Lehár assisted in leading operetta into the Silver Age of Viennese Operetta. During this time, Viennese censorship laws were changed in 1919. Lehár is most responsible for giving the genre renewed vitality. Studying at the Prague Conservatory, Lehár began as a theatre violinist and then took off as a composer in the Austro-Hungarian Empire. During 1905, Lehár's Die lustige Witwe (The Merry Widow) paved a pathway for composers such as Leo Fall, Oscar Straus, and Emmerich Kálmán to continue the tradition of operetta.

The Viennese tradition was carried on by Oscar Straus, Carl Zeller, Karl Millöcker, Leo Fall, Richard Heuberger, Edmund Eysler, Ralph Benatzky, Robert Stolz, Leo Ascher, Emmerich Kálmán, Nico Dostal, Fred Raymond, Igo Hofstetter, Paul Abraham and Ivo Tijardović in the 20th century.

=== Germany ===
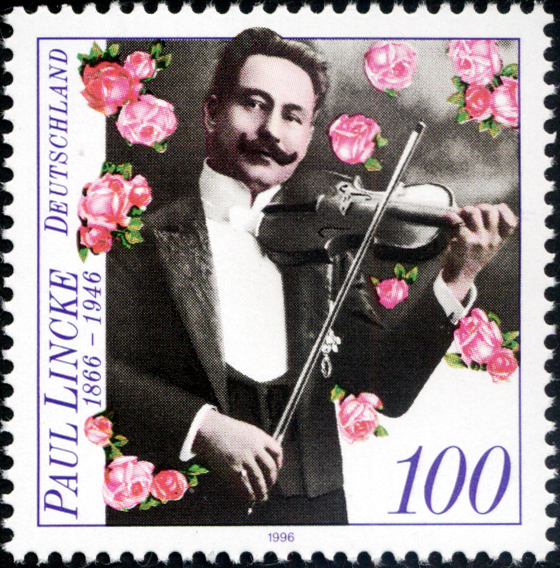
Paul Lincke, father of the Berlin operetta

In the same way that Vienna was the center of Austrian operetta, Berlin was the center of German operetta. Berlin operetta often had its own style, including, especially after World War I, elements of jazz and other syncopated dance rhythms, a transatlantic style, and the presence of ragged marching tunes. Berlin operettas also sometimes included aspects of burlesque, revue, farce, or cabaret.

Paul Lincke pioneered the Berlin operetta in 1899 with Frau Luna, which includes "Berliner Luft" ("Berlin Air"), which became the unofficial anthem of Berlin. His Lysistrata (1902) includes the song and tune "The Glow-Worm", which remains quite popular internationally. Much later, in the 1920s and 1930s, Kurt Weill took a more extreme form of the Berlin operetta style and used it in his operas, operettas, and musicals. It is arguable that some of Kurt Weill's compositions could be considered modernist operetta.

The Berlin-style operetta coexisted with more bourgeois, charming, home-loving, and nationalistic German operettas – some of which were called Volksoperetten (folk operettas). A prime example is Leon Jessel's extremely popular 1917 Schwarzwaldmädel (Black Forest Girl). These bucolic, nostalgic, home-loving operettas were officially preferred over Berlin-style operettas after 1933, when the Nazis came to power and instituted the Reichsmusikkammer (State Music Institute), which deprecated and banned "decadent" music like jazz and similar "foreign" musical forms. In the beginning of twenty-first century, German revival of operetta was an unforeseen theatrical development.

Notable German operetta composers include Paul Lincke, Eduard Künneke, Walter Kollo, Jean Gilbert, Leon Jessel, Rudolf Dellinger, Walter Goetze and Ludwig Schmidseder.

== Operetta in English ==
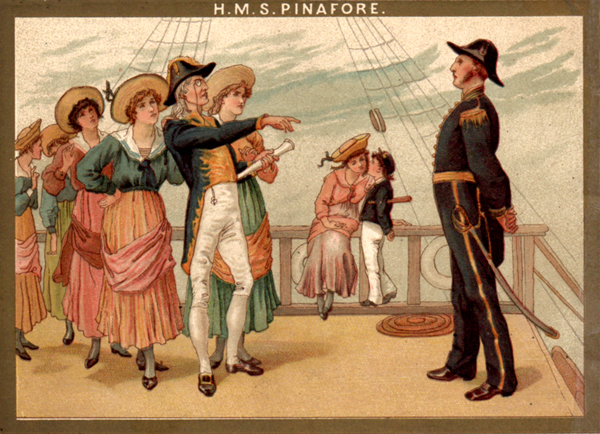
H.M.S. Pinafore

Offenbach's influence reached England by the 1860s. Arthur Sullivan, of the Gilbert and Sullivan duo, composed Cox and Box (1866) as a direct reaction to Offenbach's Les deux aveugles (1855). Gilbert and Sullivan solidified the format in England with their long-running collaboration during the Victorian era. With W. S. Gilbert writing the libretti and Sullivan composing the music, the pair produced 14 comic operas, which were later called Savoy Operas. Most were enormously popular in Britain, the U.S., and elsewhere. Gilbert, Sullivan, and their producer Richard D'Oyly Carte themselves call their joint works comic operas to distinguish this family-friendly fare from the risqué French operettas of the 1850s and 1860s. Their works, such as H.M.S. Pinafore, The Pirates of Penzance and The Mikado, continue to enjoy regular performances throughout the English-speaking world. While many of these operas seem to be very light-hearted, works such as The Mikado were making political commentaries on the British government and military with one of the main topics being capital punishment which was still widely used at the time.

English operetta continued into the 1890s, with works by composers such as Edward German, Ivan Caryll and Sidney Jones. These quickly evolved into the lighter song-and-dance pieces known as Edwardian musical comedy. Beginning in 1907, with The Merry Widow, many of the Viennese operettas were adapted very successfully for the English stage. To explain this phenomenon, Derek Scott writes,

In January 1908, London's Daily Mail claimed that The Merry Widow had been performed 450 times in Vienna, 400 times in Berlin, 350 times in St Petersburg, 300 times in Copenhagen, and was currently playing every evening in Europe in nine languages. In the USA, five companies were presenting it, and "the rush for tickets at the New Amsterdam Theatre" was likened to "the feverish crowding round the doors of a threatened bank". Stan Czech, in his Lehár biography, claims that by 1910 it had been performed "around 18,000 times in ten languages on 154 American, 142 German, and 135 British stages".

The international embrace of operetta directly correlated with the development of both the West End in London and Broadway in New York. American audiences were first introduced to operetta through Gilbert and Sullivan's H.M.S. Pinafore in 1878. American operetta composers included Victor Herbert, whose works at the beginning of the 20th century were influenced by both Viennese operetta and Gilbert and Sullivan. He was followed by Sigmund Romberg and Rudolph Friml. Nevertheless, American operetta largely gave way, by the end of World War I, to musicals, such as the Princess Theatre musicals, and revues, followed by the musicals of Rodgers and Hart, Cole Porter, Irving Berlin and others. Another notable operetta in English is Candide by Leonard Bernstein. It was advertised as a "comic operetta." Candide's score in some ways was typical for its announced genre with some waltzes, but Bernstein added the schottische, gavotte, and other dances, and also entered the opera house with the aria "Glitter and Be Gay"

== Operetta in Italian ==
Operetta was the first imported vocal genre in Italy. Since the 1860s, French and Viennese composers such as Offenbach, Hervé, Suppé, Strauss Jr and Lehár have significantly influenced the operatic tradition of Italy. The widespread popularity of foreign operetta in Italy reached its climax at the turn of the century, in particular with the success of La vedova allegra, which premiered in Milan in 1907. Italian operetta composers tended to stretch the definition of an "operetta" more than other nations in order to fit the beauty of Italian Romantic opera style. An example would be Giacomo Puccini, who developed his work in the realistic verisimo style, and would compose "operettas in three acts". Other notable composers of Italian operetta include Vincenzo Valente, Ruggero Leoncavallo, Pasquale Mario Costa, Pietro Mascagni, Carlo Lombardo, Enrico Toselli, Virgilio Ranzato and Giuseppe Pietri.

=== Reception and controversy ===
The audiences of operetta during the 1860s and 1870s are described as rowdy and loud. Operetta was considered one of the major controversies about Italian music and culture between the 1860s and the 1920s. During that period, strong nationalistic undertones in Italy strived to unify its national identity. Recognizing operetta as a foreign genre, operetta was perceived as an art form that would contaminate Italian opera or illegitimately undermine its primacy on the stage. It was not until the early twentieth century that Italian composers systematically engaged in writing operetta.

== Operetta in Romanian ==
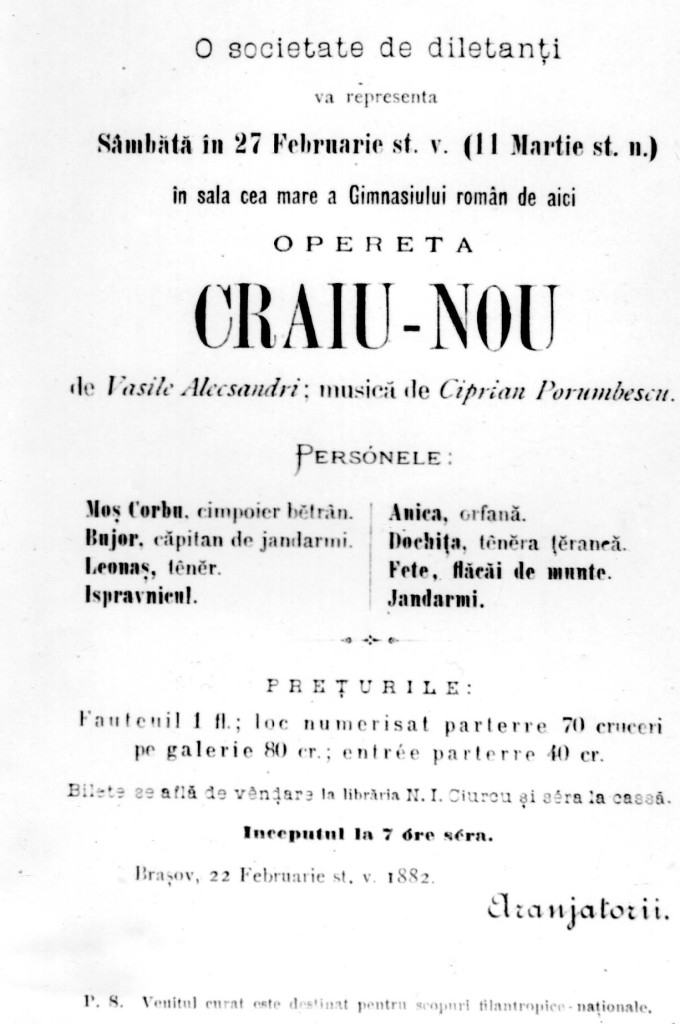
Premiere of Crai Nou in Brașov, 1882

In 1848, Baba Hârca (Baba the Old Witch) became the first operetta created in Romania; composed by the Moldavian composer of German-Saxon origin Alexandru Flechtenmacher, who was seeking a distinctly Romanian musical style, it premiered on 26 December 1848 at the National Theatre in Iași. The work is a vaudeville with an unusually developed musical dimension. Baba the Witch is a popular figure from traditional Romanian folktales, credited with freezing waters and living in isolation in a cave or at the top of a tall tree; fairy tales also attribute to her a benevolent aspect.

In 1882, another major success marked the birth of operetta in the country: Crai Nou (The New Moon), by the young composer Ciprian Porumbescu, with a libretto by Vasile Alecsandri. The premiere took place in Brașov on an improvised stage, the Romanian Gymnasium's festival hall, on 27 February 1882. The work, which highlights Romanian culture and traditions in contrast to Viennese culture, displays a distinctly patriotic character at a time when Transylvania was under Austro-Hungarian rule. It is particularly renowned for its famous Viennese-style chorus and for Porumbescu’s success in integrating the Romanian folk spirit—such as the Hora, Doina, peasant dances, and traditional songs—into lyrical art while combining it with Western influences. Three other composers Eduard Caudella with Harță Răzeșul (1872), George Stephănescu with Sânziana și Pepelea (1880), on a libretto by Vasile Alecsandri and Scaiul bărbaților (1885), and Constantin Dimitrescu with Sergentul Cartuș (1895) and Nini (1897), were the first creators of Romanian operettas. They played a pivotal role in cultivating and establishing the Romanian public’s keen interest in this art form, a genre that has remained popular to the present day.

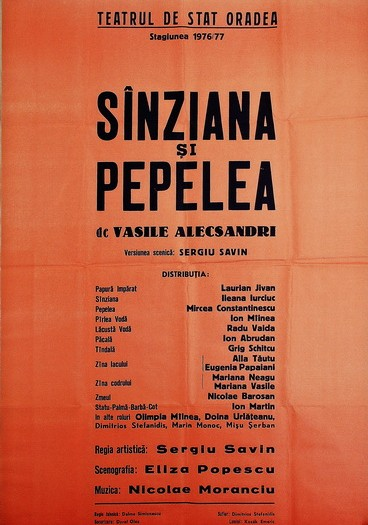
Sânziana și Pepelea, Oradea, 1976

30 October 1954 marks a milestone in Romanian creative life with the premiere of the work Lăsați-mă să cânt (Let Me Sing) by Gherase Dendrino, to a libretto by Erastia Sever, Liliana Delescu, and Viorel Cosma, in which the leading role was performed by Ion Dacian. This anniversary work, written in 1953 to commemorate the 100th anniversary of the birth of Ciprian Porumbescu, is a celebration of his operetta Crai Nou, composed 72 years earlier in 1882. It thus forms a bridge to the first Romanian operetta. In a context of decline for operetta in Romania, the production presented on the stage of the State Operetta Theatre was an enormous success, a success undoubtedly owed in large part to its excellent cast. The work was also performed abroad, in other countries of the Eastern Bloc, and its libretto was translated into German, Czech, Russian, and Hungarian.

The successors of Ion Dacian continued to maintain a balance between works from the classical Austrian and Hungarian repertoires (Strauss, Lehár, Kálmán, Benatzky, etc.) and Romanian creations such as Spune inimioară, spune! (Say, My Heart, Say!, 1972) by Elly Roman, Mătușa mea, Faustina (My Aunt Faustina) (1973) by Liviu Cavassi and Doru Butoiescu, and Raspantia (1975) and Leonard (1976) by Florin Comișel. The domestic programming reflected the contributions of authors who played a significant role in Romanian operetta: Gherase Dendrino (1901–1973), Filaret Barbu (1903–1984), Nicolae Kirculescu (1903–1985), Elly Roman (1905–1996), Alfred Mendelsohn (1910–1966), Viorel Doboș (1917–1985), Henry Mălineanu (1920–2000), Florin Comișel (1922–1977), and George Grigoriu (1927–1999). This approach allowed the theatre to combine an international tradition with Romanian cultural identity, sustaining public interest in the operetta genre.

In 1977, to celebrate the centenary of Romania’s independence, a special work was staged: Eternel Iubiri (Eternal Love), composed by George Grigoriu with a libretto by Constantin Florea. The premiere took place on 7 May 1977 at the State Operetta Theatre of Bucharest. The work, centered on the struggle against the Turks, aligned with the nationalist propaganda of the Communist Party, emphasizing patriotism and heroes of Romanian history. This national-communist cultural policy, which became highly visible under Ceaușescu, had already been initiated in the 1960s by Gheorghe Gheorghiu-Dej.

The 2002–2003 season opened with a major national premiere, Fântâna Blanduziei (The Fountain of Blanduzia), created by one of the most renowned contemporary composers, Cornel Trăilescu, to a libretto by the poet and playwright Aurel Storin, based on the original work (1883) by the Romanian poet Vasile Alecsandri.

Lăsați-mă să cânt returned to the repertoire during the 2003–2004 season. Productions multiplied until 2005, strengthening the institution’s identity and visibility within the Romanian cultural landscape.

== See also ==
- Comic opera
- List of operetta composers
- Musical theatre
- Operetta film
- Zarzuela
