= The Cousin from Nowhere =

The Cousin from Nowhere (German:Der Vetter aus Dingsda) may refer to:

- The Cousin from Nowhere (operetta), a 1921 work composed by Eduard Künneke
- The Cousin from Nowhere (1934 film), a film adaptation directed by Georg Zoch
- The Cousin from Nowhere (1953 film), a film adaptation directed by Karl Anton
