= Halunkenpostille =

Collection of poetry by Fritz Graßhoff

Halunkenpostille Schräge Songs, halbseidene Lieder und wunderschöne Gedichte
- Author: Fritz Graßhoff
- Illustrator: Bernd Hering
- Language: German
- Genre: Poetry collection
- Published: 1947
- Publisher: J.A. Keune

Halunkenpostille is the title of a collection of poetry by the German writer Fritz Graßhoff. It could be translated as Scoundrel's Postil, and it reflects the title of Bertolt Brecht's Hauspostille, a collection of poems, which parodies Martin Luther's Hauspostille, a collection of Bible commentaries. A recording of songs from the Halunkenpostille was subtitled Schräge Songs, halbseidene Lieder und wunderschöne Gedichte, which may be rendered as Cockeyed Songs, Dubious Ditties and Wonderful Poems. The style shows similarities to works by Erich Kästner, Walter Mehring and Joachim Ringelnatz.

== Halunkenpostille ==
First published in 1947, the collection of more than 100 poems, ballads and songs is one of the most successful poetry books of the postwar period. The first printing, by J.A. Keune in Hamburg, was illustrated by Bernd Hering. Carl Lange published it in 1954 with drawings by the author. Many texts were set to music and recorded by renowned artists, both in song and recitation. The total circulation was about 300,000 copies.

Songs from the Halunkenpostille were set to music for example by Siegfried Strohbach, Halunkensongs for baritone, trumpet, violin, accordion, double bass and percussion, published by Breitkopf & Härtel in 1956.

Texts from the book were recited and sung on a 1967 recording Halunkenpostille. Schräge Songs, halbseidene Lieder und wunderschöne Gedichte, with music by Hans-Martin Majewski and Norbert Schultze, performed by Hanne Wieder, Hannelore Schroth, Gustav Knuth, Gisela aus Schwabing, Kirsten Heiberg, Ralf Bendix, Jens Brenke, Inge Brandenburg, Werner Schmalenbach and Fritz Graßhoff.

== Die klassische Halunkenpostille ==
Graßhoff wrote a second collection, Die klassische Halunkenpostille. Epigramme und Satiren. (The classical Halunkenpostille, epigrams and satires), translations of Roman authors such as Martial, Catullus and Philodemus, published by Kiepenheuer & Witsch in 1964.

== Printed editions ==
- Halunken-Postille, illustrated by Bernd Hering. Noten. J.A. Keune. Hamburg 1947
- Halunkenpostille. Rumpelkammerromanzen, Hafenballaden, Spelunkensongs, with drawings by Fritz Graßhoff. Carl Lange. Duisburg 1954
- Die klassische Halunkenpostille. Epigramme und Satiren. Kiepenheuer & Witsch Köln/Berlin 1964
- Halunkenpostille. Rumpelkammerromanzen, Hafenballaden, Spelunkensongs. Neu: Zinkenklavier. Carl Lange Duisburg 1959, now Mercator-Verlag Duisburg 1968
- Die große Halunkenpostille. Songs, Balladen, Moritaten. Alte und neue Verse. Deutscher Taschenbuch Verlag (in German) Munich 1963, 11th edition 1981. ISBN 3-423-00150-X
- Graßhoffs neue große Halunkenpostille. Das ist die 1947 erstmalig erschienene auf Zuwachs geschneiderte und hiermit beträchtlich erweiterte Halunkenpostille. Beigefügtes Werk: Nebst dem Allgemein ungültigen Bauernkalender von 1954. Neu bebildert vom Autor selbst. Limes Wiesbaden 1981. ISBN 3-8090-2183-0
- Kleine Halunken-Postille. Eine Querbeet-Lese aus den Lieder- und Lästerbüchern des Fritz Graßhoff. Special edition for the Bertelsmann Lesering (Book Club), Gütersloh 1988

== Sources ==
- Friedrich Zehm: Ein Bündel Chanson. In: The Musical Times Nr. 1519. Berkhamsted 1969. ISSN 0027-4666
- Eva Demski: Vagabund, Bänkelsänger, Malerpoet, Klabautermann. Frankfurter Allgemeine Zeitung, 22 December 1989
- Wolfgang Ries: Gebrauchsware und Unnützes / Einige subjektive Anmerkungen zu Person und Werk von Fritz Graßhoff (Gebrauchsware und Unnützes / some subjective remarks on the person and work of Fritz Graßhoff) muschelhaufen.de (in German)
