= Mojca Erdmann =

German soprano

- Born: 29 December 1975 (age 50); Hamburg, Germany
- Education: Hochschule für Musik und Tanz Köln
- Occupation: Operatic soprano
- Website: mojcaerdmann.com

Mojca Erdmann (born 29 December 1975) is a German soprano who is particularly associated with the Mozart operas. She created the role of Ariadne in Rihm's Dionysos at the Salzburg Festival.

== Career ==
Born in Hamburg, Erdmann sang in the children's chorus of the Hamburg State Opera together with her brother. As a teenager she began studying singing seriously with soprano Evelyn Herlitzius before entering the Hochschule für Musik und Tanz Köln where she was a pupil of Hans Sotin and studied with soprano Ingrid Figur. In 2002 she won first prize and the Special Prize for Contemporary Music at the Bundeswettbewerb Gesang Berlin (Federal Singing Competition), and in August 2005 she was awarded the Luitpold Prize at the Kissinger Sommer festival and the Norddeutscher Rundfunk Music Prize at the Schleswig-Holstein Musik Festival. She appeared as Sempronia in the premiere of the critical edition of Jacques Offenbach's Apothicaire et perruquier at the Kurtheater Bad Ems on 1 June 2007, with the WDR Rundfunkorchester Köln, directed by Helmuth Froschauer.

In July 2010, she created the role of Ariadne in the world premiere of Wolfgang Rihm's Dionysos at the Salzburg Festival, repeated at the Berlin State Opera in 2012. In January 2011, she gave a lauded portrayal of Despina in Mozart's Così fan tutte at the Festspielhaus Baden-Baden. In October 2011, she made her debut at the Metropolitan Opera as Zerlina in the company's new staging of Mozart's Don Giovanni.

On 14 February 2013, Erdmann attempted to represent Germany in the Eurovision Song Contest 2013 with Die Priester singing a revised version of Ave Maris Stella. She finished 10th place in the national final.

== Discography ==
- Mostly Mozart (2011, Deutsche Grammophon) with La Cetra and conductor Andrea Marcon
