= Herta Talmar =

Austrian singer and opera singer

Herta Talmar (4 July 1920 – 24 June 2010) was an Austrian operetta singer (soprano) as well as an actress.

== Life ==
Born in Salzburg, Talmar first stood on a theatre stage at the age of eleven; in the operetta Die Kaiserin by Leo Fall at the Salzburger Landestheater. She received her singing training at the Salzburg Mozarteum. In 1952 she appeared at the Landestheater Salzburg as a guest in the operetta Ballnacht in Florenz by Edwin Burmester (music based on motives by Johann Strauss II); after that she was engaged there permanently. From 1952 to 1957 Talmar was then a member of the ensemble at the Salzburg Landestheater. There she appeared in numerous operetta productions, among others in Die gold'ne Meisterin (1953), Abschiedswalzer by Ludwig Schmidseder. (1953, with Hubert Marischka as partner), Marietta by Walter Kollo (1953), Her Last Waltz by Oscar Straus (1954) and in August 1956 with Johannes Heesters in Franz Lehár's operetta The Merry Widow. From 1957 Talmar worked as a freelancer, gave guest performances and sang mainly for radio. Her repertoire mainly consisted of operetta, but also musicals, folk songs, popular Viennese songs and schlagers.

Talmar became known especially for her numerous operetta cross sections, which were created in the 1950s and 1960s and published exclusively on Polydor records. Almost the entire popular operetta repertoire was recorded, including Wiener Blut, Der Bettelstudent, Gasparone, Der Vogelhändler, The Merry Widow, The Count of Luxembourg, Der Zarewitsch, The Land of Smiles, Paganini, Die Csárdásfürstin, Countess Mariza, The Circus Princess, The Dollar Princess, A Waltz Dream, The Cousin from Nowhere, Schwarzwaldmädel, Im weißen Rößl, Saison in Salzburg, Viktoria und ihr Husar and The Flower of Hawaii. In these recordings Talmar always sang the soprano part under the musical direction of the operetta conductor Franz Marszalek, with changing tenor partners such as Sándor Kónya, Fritz Wunderlich, Franz Fehringer and Reinhold Bartel; further performers were often Peter Alexander, Willy Hofmann, Rita Bartos and Renate Holm. In addition, Polydor produced a series of so-called composer pictures in the 1950s. Here Herta Talmar often formed a singing couple with Herbert Ernst Groh. With the orchestra Kurt Edelhagen a cross-section of the musical My Fair Lady was also produced, in which Talmar, however, only sang lady Eliza, while the flower girl Eliza was sung by the cabaret artist and monologist Cissy Kraner

Talmar made numerous complete recordings of operettas and musical comedies on radio in the 1950s and 1960s, mostly on Westdeutscher Rundfunk with Franz Marszalek. Under the musical direction of Marszalek, complete operetta recordings such as Der fidele Bauer (1954), Die Försterchristl (1955) were made, A Waltz Dream (1954), Adrienne (1956), Gasparone (1956) and Auf der grünen Wiese by Jara Beneš (1959). Because of her pleasant speaking voice and her acting talent Talmar always took over the speaking role of the respective part; often in comparable productions for singers and actors separate interpreters were engaged. In addition, countless single titles from operettas were recorded. Among them there are many rarities.

Talmar's radio recordings at the Westdeutscher Rundfunk, as far as they have survived, have been released extensively in recent years on CDs, in some cases on several labels (Line Music, Membran, Hamburger Archiv für Gesangskunst). In 1958 a recording of Lehár's Die Lustige Witwe was made with Talmar at the Westdeutscher Rundfunk with Fred Liewehr as Danilo.

In February 1955 a radio recording of the musical comedy Das kleine Café by Robert Stolz was made at the Bayerischer Rundfunk, in which Talmar sang alongside Christl Mardayn and Peter Alexander. In July 1955 followed also at the Bayerischer Rundfunk in Munich, a musical potpourri with Talmar with music from the film Die Deutschmeister; under the musical direction of Robert Stolz, the tenors Herbert Ernst Groh and Ferry Gruber. At the end of 1955 a recording of the operetta Venus im Grünen by Oscar Straus was made in Vienna at the Österreichischer Rundfunk, in which Waldemar Kmentt was Talmar's tenor partner.

In the 1960s Talmar took part in several operetta adaptations (The Empress, The Cousin from Dingda, The Beggar Student, Gasparone, Paganini, A Night in Venice) which were made for television. She lent her singing voice to actresses Gerlinde Locker, Birgit Bergen and Gardy Granass.

After ending her singing career in the mid-1960s, Talmar appeared as an actress, among others at the Münchner Volkstheater in 1968. Talmar last lived in Salzburg, where she died in June 2010 shortly before her 90th birthday.

== Recordings ==
- Ein Walzertraum: complete recording 1954. Westdeutscher Rundfunk – Franz Marszalek
  Herta Talmar (Franzi); Kurt Großkurth (Fürst Joachim); Herbert Ernst Groh (Leutnant Niki); Willy Hofmann (Leutnant Montschi); Käthe Graus (Prinzessin Helene)
  Line Music Service 5.01133 (2 CDs)
- Die Försterchristl: complete recording 1955. Westdeutscher Rundfunk – Franz Marszalek
  Herta Talmar (Christl); Peter René Körner (Kaiser Josef II); Franz Fehringer (Franz Földessy); Peter Alexander (Peter Walperl); Käthe Graus (Countesse Josefine)
  Hamburger Archiv für Gesangskunst 30140 (2 CDs)
- Gasparone: complete recording 1956. Westdeutscher Rundfunk – Franz Marszalek
  Herta Talmar (Sora); Anny Schlemm (Carlotta); Josef Metternich (Der Fremde); Willy Hofmann (Benozzo); Benno Kusche (Nasoni)
  Line Music Service 5.01131 (2 CDs)
- Adrienne: complete recording 1956. Westdeutscher Rundfunk – Franz Marszalek
  Herta Talmar (Adrienne Lecouvreur); Lore Lorentz (Herzogin Anna Iwanowna); Franz Fehringer (Moritz von Sachsen); Willy Hofmann (Benozzo); Philipp Gehly (Fleury)
  Line Music Service 5.01100 (2 CDs)
- Auf der grünen Wiese: complete recording 1959. Westdeutscher Rundfunk – Franz Marszalek
  Herta Talmar (Vera); Peter René Körner (Wittgenstein); Franz Fehringer (Liebling); Friedl Münzer (Lubiza); Rita Bartos (Hanni)
  Hamburger Archiv für Gesangskunst 30144 (2 CD)
