= Fritz Oliven =

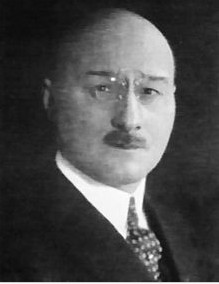
A portrait of Fritz Oliven

Fritz Oliven, also known as Rideamus (May 10, 1874 – June 30, 1956) was a German lawyer and writer who was born in Breslau and died in 1956 in Porto Alegre, Brazil. Under the pseudonym Rideamus, Oliven went from being a lawyer to a successful author. As a lyricist, librettist and revue composer, he worked with Oscar Straus, Walter Kollo and Eduard Künneke and wrote for the great hall revues. Some of these works include the operetta The Cousin from Nowhere and the revue Noch und Noch. As a Jew, he decided to immigrate to Brazil in 1939. In 1951, the autobiography Rideamus, From He Himself, The Story of a Jovial Life was published.

== Selected filmography ==
- The Cousin from Nowhere (1934)
- The Cousin from Nowhere (1953)
