= Apothicaire et perruquier =

1861 operetta by Jacques Offenbach

Jacques Offenbach by Nadar, c. 1860s

Apothicaire et perruquier (Apothecary and Wigmaker/Hairdresser) is a one-act opérette-bouffe with music by Jacques Offenbach to a French libretto by Élie Frébault, first performed in 1861, one of six new works he premiered that year. Faris describes the score as "pastiche" "in the decorated vocal style of the eighteenth century".

== Performance history ==
The libretto ('opérette du temps jadis' [operetta from times gone by]) was first set to music by Laurent de Rillé but the score was lost. In the face of an irate librettist, Offenbach set to work to compose an operetta in a pastiche of classical style. The premiere of Offenbach's work was on 17 October 1861 at the Salle Choiseul, Paris, and it shared the bill on the opening night of the following season. It was also on the bill for the premiere of La permission de dix heures in September 1873 at the Théâtre de la Renaissance.

The Offenbach-Keck critical edition of Apothicaire et perruquier was first performed at the Kurtheater, Bad Ems, Germany, (in German) on the 1 June 2007, with the WDR Rundfunkorchester Köln conducted by Helmuth Froschauer, with soloists Mojca Erdmann, Jörg Sabrowski, Leandro Fischetti and Michael Gann.

== Roles ==
Roles, voice types, premiere cast
Role	Voice type	Premiere cast, 17 October 1861 Conductor: Jacques Offenbach
Boudinet	tenor	Desmonts
Chilpéric	tenor	Pierre-Armand Potel
Plumoiseau	tenor	Jean-Paul
Sempronia	soprano	Mlle Gervais

== Synopsis ==
A modest room, at the time of Louis XV

Boudinet reads a letter from his old friend the apothecary Plumoiseau in La Palisse. Boudinet has agreed as a gesture of goodwill to marry his daughter Sempronia to Plumoiseau's promising son neither of whom have met. It is the day of the wedding and he awaits the bride's hairdresser, and the bridegroom.

The hairdresser Chilpéric arrives, Boudinet mistaking him for the bridegroom, complimenting and offering him dinner but not allowing him to see the bride. While Boudinet goes to check the final preparations of the ceremony, Chilpéric alone, in a Romance, muses on a girl with the most beautiful hair he once met in Carpentras. When Sempronia enters looking for the hairdresser, they recognise each other but she takes him to be the young apothecary. At which point the real apothecary Plumoiseau arrives, Boudinet castigating him for his lateness and telling him that the wedding could not go ahead without him ... The four express their differing feelings in an ensemble. Despite his inability to do so, Plumoiseau is told to go with Sempronia and do the bride's hair. After more confusion between the father and hairdresser, Sempronia rushes in, her hair a mess, complaining about the supposed hairdresser who has broken her tortoise-shell comb. Chilpéric volunteers to restore her coiffure and they go out. Boudinet and Plumoiseau have a furious argument, the father angry that his daughter's hair is not yet ready, the intended bridegroom for being treated so roughly by his father's old friend.

Sempronia re-enters during the uproar, and after more confusion she intervenes: Chilpéric is the man she fell for while staying in the countryside. Boudinet refuses to back down from giving her away to a Plumoiseau. On hearing this Chilpéric reveals that his family name is also Plumoiseau, in fact he is a cousin of the pharmacist's son – and the two embrace and decide to go out and have a meal together. But Boudinet summons them back and agrees to the marriage of Sempronia and the hairdresser – with the apothecary in attendance.
