= Alice Regnault =

French actress (1849–1931)

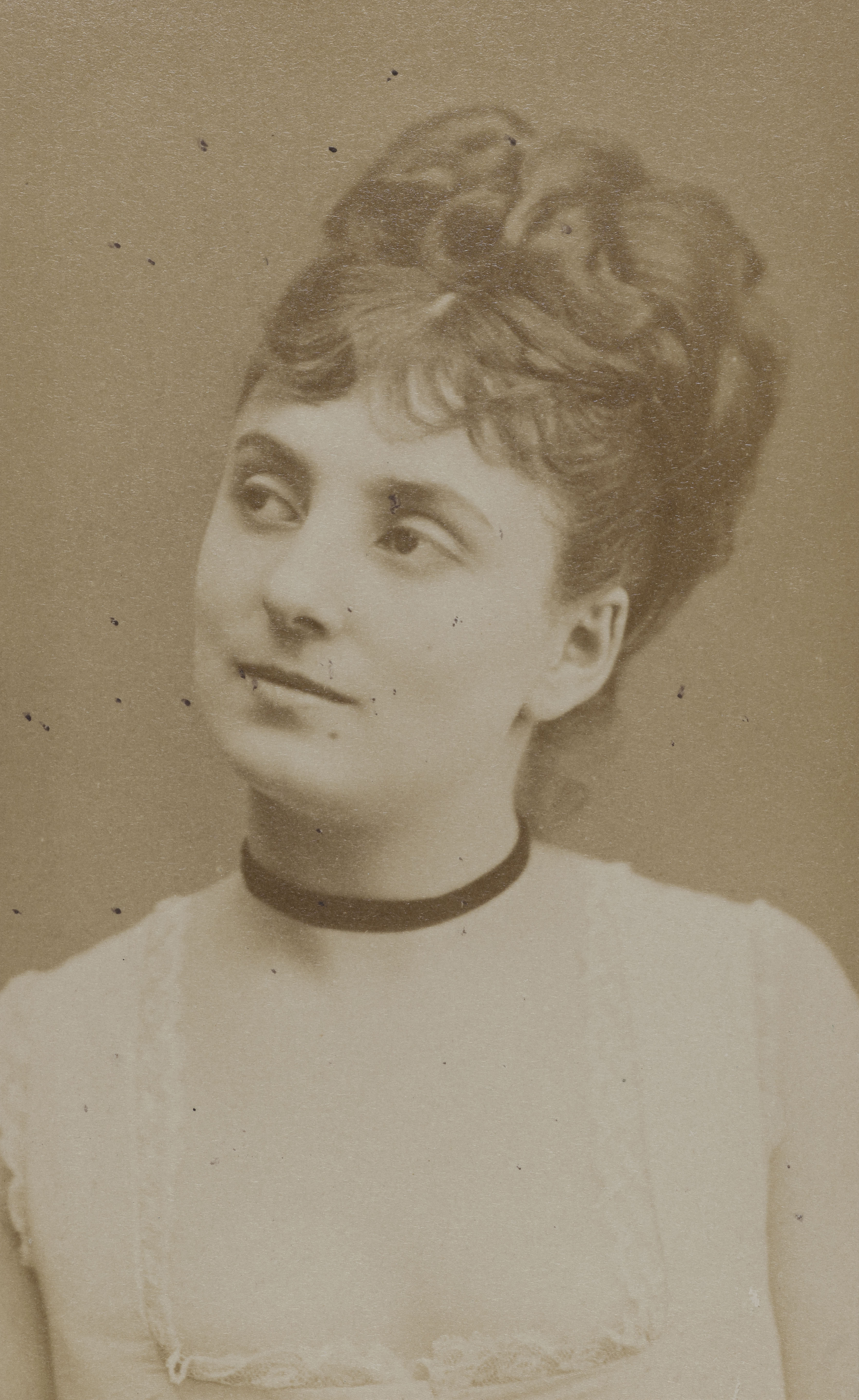
- Alice Regnault photographed by Bacard Fils
- Born: Augustine-Alexandrine Toulet; 5 February 1849; Paris, France
- Died: 12 July 1931 (aged 82); Triel-sur-Seine, France
- Occupation: Actress
- Years active: 1868–1883
- Spouse: Jules Louise Renard (m. 1865; died 1868) Octave Mirbeau (m. 1887; died 1917)
- Children: 1

Alice Regnault (born Augustine-Alexandrine Toulet; 5 February 1849 – 12 July 1931) was a French actress and courtesan.

Her theatrical career began in 1868, after the death of her first husband. Critics praised her for her beauty and talent, and she performed in a large number of roles throughout her career. She became very rich as a courtesan in Paris and she had relationships of varying lengths with wealthy men. She retired from the stage in 1883, at the age of 34. She briefly worked as a journalist, and published two novels: Mademoiselle Pomme (1886) and La Famille Carmettes (1888).

She is known for secretly marrying the French writer Octave Mirbeau, in May 1887, while they were in London.

== Early life ==
Augustine-Alexandrine Toulet was born to Edmond Désiré Toulet and Louise Hermanjat in the former 1st Arrondissement of Paris. Her father worked as a house painter. In 1865, at the age of 16, she married her first husband, a tool maker named Jules Louise Renard. They had a son together in 1866 named Édouard, who would be her only child. When her husband died in 1868, she and her son were left in poverty, and so to support them she started her theatrical career and became a courtesan. However, because of her lifestyle, she lost custody of her son. Édouard would die at age 26 in 1892.

== Career ==
Regnault's first acting and vocal teacher was Auguste Coédès, a French composer. While performing at a concert, she was discovered by the prolific operetta composer Jacques Offernbach. He offered her a position at the Bouffes Parisiens and in November 1868, when she was only 19, she debuted in his operetta Apothicaire et Perruquier. She appeared in many of Offenbach's operettas throughout her career as well as operettas by other composers. She was well known for appearing in Les Trône d'Ecosse by Hervé as Julia, a horse guard. After her performance in that show she was offered a role in Les Sceptiques at the Théâtre de Cluny.

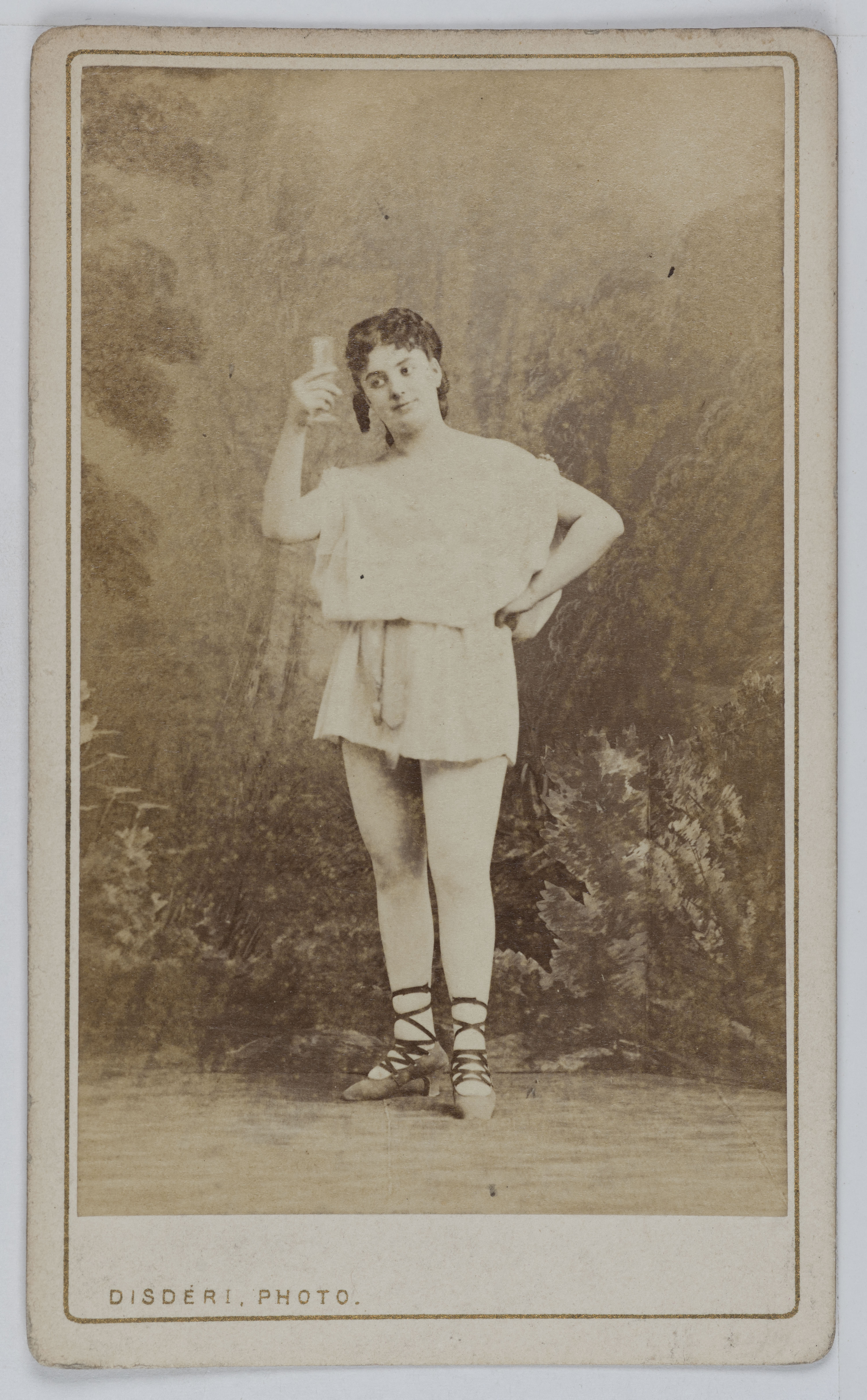
Alice Regnault photographed by André-Adolphe-Eugène Disderi

She studied voice with the composer Charles Lecocq while she appeared in his operetta Les cent vierges in 1872. From 1872 until at least 1876, she studied at the National Conservatory of Dramatic Art with François-Joseph Regnier, a well known teacher and former actor at the Théâtre-Français.

In 1873, while she was working at the Théâtre des Variétés, Regnault and other actresses were accused of prostitution by a journalist, Gabriel Hugelmann, after a police raid of a brothel. She denied the claims, and Regnault and Marguerite Debreux sued Hugelmann for defamation after the newspaper admitted they were wrong.

In 1874 she began performing with the Théâtre du Palais-Royal, a prestigious theater and she became even more well known. Regnault received many good reviews and that year was called one of the “Choicest celebrities of the stage.” Even her more negative reviews admitted that she was very beautiful and elegant. Towards the end of her career she travelled to Brussels to act in Divorçons playing the role of Chaumont. In 1880, after returning from this trip, she attempted to gain a position at the Comédie-Française, though she did not succeed. She has only one recorded performance after this rejection, at the Théâtre du Vaudeville.

=== Roles ===
Bouffes Parisiens

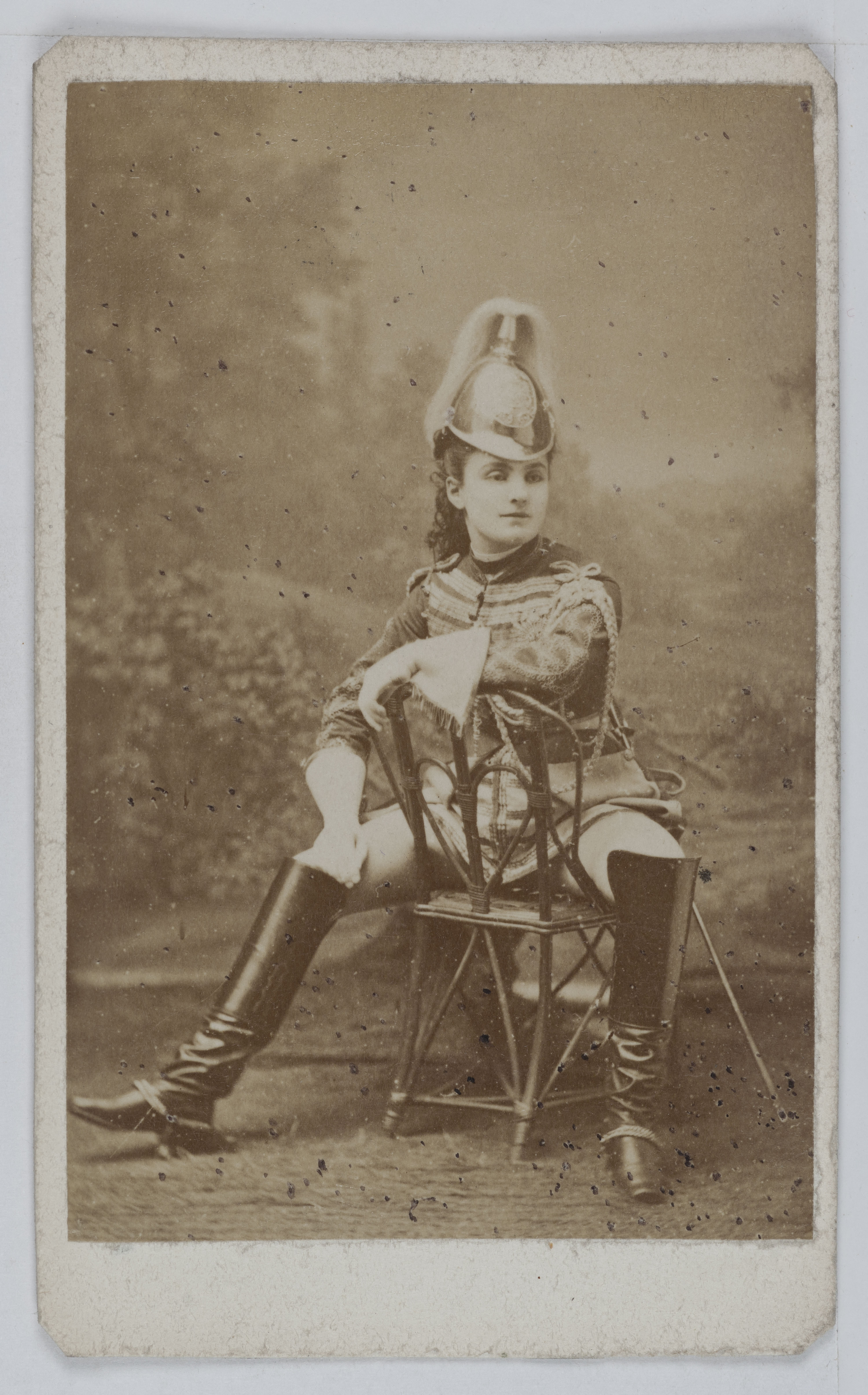
Alice Reganult as Julia the horse guard in Le Trône d'Ecosse

- 1868 - Apothicaire et Perruquier by Jacques Offenbach
- 1869 - La Diva by Jacques Offenbach

Théâtre des Variétés

- 1869 - La Grande-Duchesse de Gérolstein by Jacques Offenbach
- 1869 - Les Brigands by Jacques Offenbach
- 1871 - Le Trône d'Ecosse, by Hervé, role of Julia
- 1872 - Les cent vierges by Charles Lecocq
- 1872 - Le Tour du Cadran by Henry Bocage
- 1872 - La revue n'est pas au coin du quai by Paul Siraudin
- Unknown year - Orphée aux Enfers by Jacques Offenbach
- Unknown year - La Belle-Hélène by Jacques Offenbach

Théâtre de Cluny

- 1873 - Les Sceptiques by Félicien Mallefille, role of Mme Landurel
- 1873 - La Maison du mari by Xavier de Montépin and Victor Kervani

Théâtre du Palais-Royal

- 1874 - Le Homard by Edmond Gondinet
- 1874 - Les Samedis de madame by Eugène Labiche
- 1874 - La Boule by Henri Meilhac
- 1874 -Tricoche et Cacolet by Ludovic Halevy and Henri Meilhac
- 1875 - Le Plus Heureux des trois by Eugène Labiche
- 1876 - l'Avant-Scène, by Ernest Blum
- Unknown year - la Mi-Ca-rême by Ludovic Halevy and Henri Meilhac

Théâtre de la Gaîté

- 1877 - Le Voyage dans la lune by Jacques Offenbach

Théâtre du Gymnase

- 1877 - Les Mariages d'Autrefois by Adolphe d'Ennery, role of Angèle
- 1878 - La Femme de chambre by Paul Ferrier, role of la femme de chambre
- 1878 - Petite Correspondance by Najac and Hennequin
- 1878 - Paris sans cocher by Paul Ferrier
- 1878 - L'Âge ingrat by Edouard Pailleron
- 1880 - Andréa by Victorien Sardou

Théâtre du Vaudeville

- 1883 - Les Affolés by Pierre Véron

=== Life as a courtesan ===
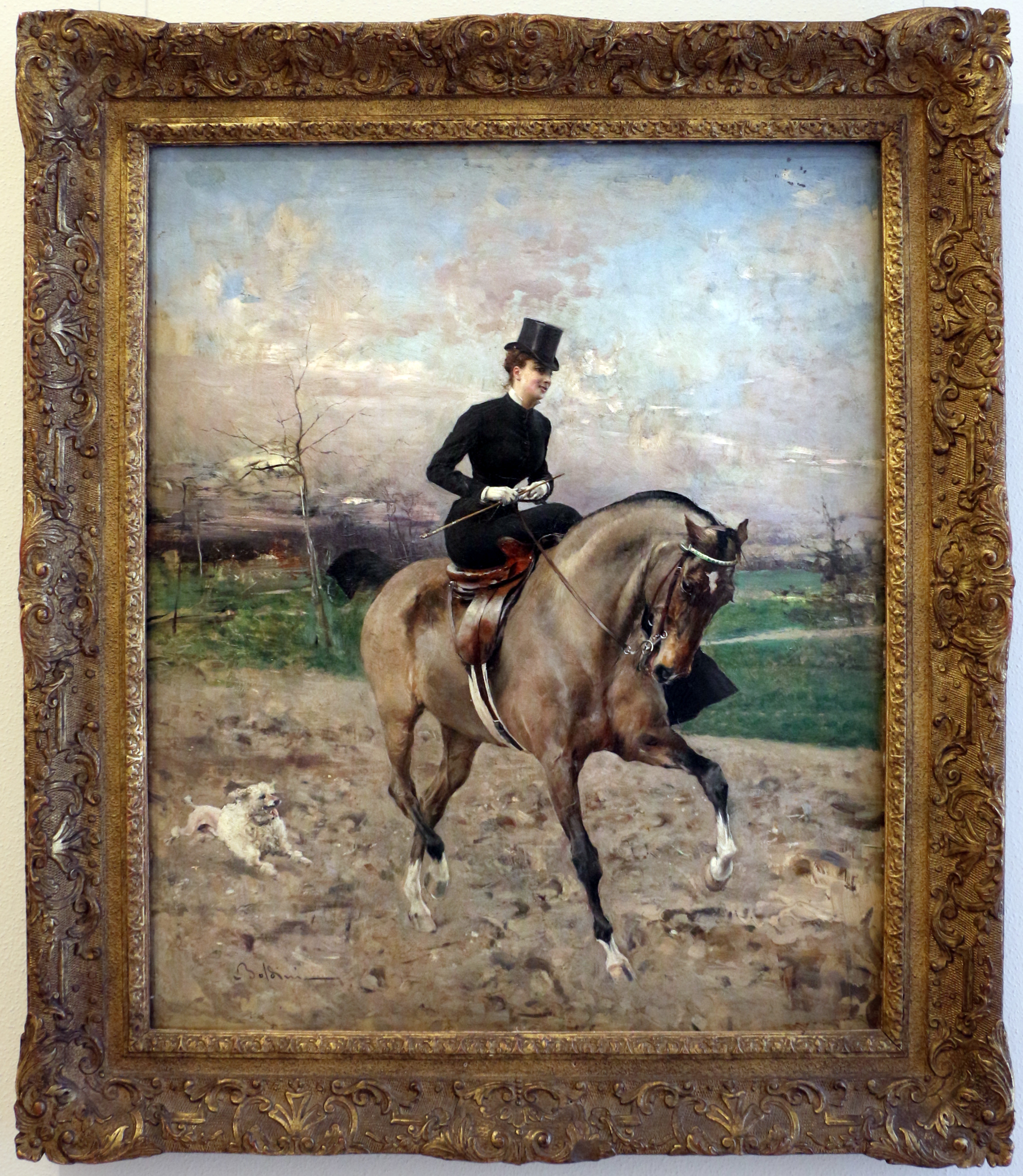
Portrait of Regnault on horseback (1878) by Boldini

In addition to being an actress, Regnault was a successful courtesan and was included in contemporary police records of courtesans. She had relationships with many powerful men in the French government, who would give her large sums of money, jewels and occasionally houses. She was also noted in these records as having relationships with women. By 1881 she owned several properties and had amassed a fortune of over 4 million francs. She moved in the same circles as many of the most famous actresses and courtesans of the day, including Cora Pearl, Sarah Bernhardt, and Blanche d'Antigny.

=== Artist's model ===
Regnault also posed for artists and photographers, and was the subject of three paintings exhibited at the Paris Salon. The first, done in 1878 but exhibited in 1880, was by Giovanni Boldini. He asked Regnault to pose for portrait on horseback. She appeared in another painting in the 1880 Salon, L’Amazone by Louise Abbéma, which shows her on stairs outside of Sarah Bernhardt's home in a riding habit. Her third portrait, this time by Gustave Courtois, appeared in the 1888 Salon. She also posed for numerous photographs for Bacard Fils, André-Adolphe-Eugène Disderi and Nadar.

== Later life ==
After retiring from the stage Regnault pursued writing. She published her first book, Mademoiselle Pomme in 1886 and her second, La Famille Carmettes, in 1888. She also worked as a journalist under the pseudonym of Mitaine de Soie at the newspaper Le Gaulois. In 1887, she secretly married the French writer Octave Mirbeau in London, whom she had been in a relationship with for three years. Mirbeau died in 1917 and after his death, she published the fictitious Testament politique d’Octave Mirbeau, which was in fact written by former anti-militarist and pacifist Gustave Hervé. Sacha Guitry dramatized this event in his 1923 comedy, Un sujet de roman. Alice Regnault died in Triel-sur-Seine on 12 July 1931 at the age of 82.
