= Glückliche Reise =

Glückliche Reise may refer to:

- Glückliche Reise (operette), 1932 operetta by Eduard Künneke
- Bon Voyage (1933 film), German film of Künneke's operetta
- Bon Voyage (1954 film), German film of Künneke's operetta
