= Reinhold Bartel =

German opera singer

Reinhold Bartel (1 March 1926 – 10 August 1996) was a German operatic tenor.

== Life and career ==
Born in Trier, Bartel studied singing at the Hochschule für Musik und Tanz Köln and already at this time appeared at the Theater Bonn as Rosillon in The Merry Widow. In 1953 he got his first engagement at the Theater Trier. In 1956 he moved to the Hessisches Staatstheater Wiesbaden, where he was a member of the ensemble until his stage farewell in 1977. On guest tours he appeared among others at the Vienna State Opera and the Grand Theatre, Warsaw.

Bartel mainly took over scores from the lyrical tenor field: the title hero in Serse, Idamante in Idomeneo, Don Ottavio in Don Giovanni, Tamino in The Magic Flute, Jacquino in Fidelio, Wilhelm Meister in Mignon, Lenski in Eugene Onegin and Stewa in Jenůfa. To his later vocal parts belonged the captain in Berg's Wozzeck and Schwalb in Mathis der Maler.

He took part in the world premiere of the opera Yolimba by Wilhelm Killmayer on 15 March 1964 in Wiesbaden, as well as in the German premieres of Robert Ward's The Crucible (1963) and Galuppi's La diavolessa (1964).

He was also a popular operetta singer. In this area, Bartel sang with many well-known stars like Peter Alexander, René Kollo, Herta Talmar, Rita Bartos and Margit Schramm. Several operetta parts were created by Polydor under the conductor Franz Marszalek. Bartel also worked together with Marszalek at WDR Köln. There he appeared in complete recordings of the operettas Die schöne Galathée, Die geschiedene Frau and Der Vogelhändler. He recorded operetta parts and songs accompanied by large orchestras at almost all German radio stations, could be heard in numerous radio broadcasts and was active again and again as a concert and oratorio singer.

In the 1960s, Bartel, who was regarded as a versatile tenor, ventured into the so-called light music: he recorded the two hits Ich will dich nicht verlieren and Morgen, da wird es schöner sein (conductor: Franz Marszalek) for Polydor. The single immediately made it into the hit parade of Radio Luxemburg. Several times he appeared in the evening program of the German television, among others in the quiz shows Einer wird gewinnen with Hans-Joachim Kulenkampff, Erkennen Sie die Melodie?, Zum Blauen Bock with Otto Höpfner, in elaborately produced operetta films like the WDR production Hofball für den Walzerkönig conducted by Franz Marszalek.

Bartel sang the high C so clearly that his then record company Telefunken gave him the nickname "Knight of the High C". Since 1976 he worked as a pedagogue at the Johannes Gutenberg University Mainz.

He is the father of the ZDF newscaster Elmar Bartel.

Bartel died in Wiesbaden at age 70.
