= Heinz Geese =

German composer and conductor (1930–2008)

Heinz Geese (6 April 1930 in Bonn – 23 April 2008), also Heinz Gieese) was a German composer, pianist, conductor and arranger.

As a conductor he led the Großes Unterhaltungsorchester of the broadcaster Westdeutscher Rundfunk (WDR) on radio and recordings. Geese was also composer of musicals and performed as a pianist.

Geese died in Bonn at age 78.

== Work ==
=== Compositions ===
- Foxy rettet Amerika, a musical for children from 8 - 80 by Fritz Graßhoff, Schott Music 1977
- Die Seefahrt nach Rio, scenic cantata with verses by James Krüss, Schott Music
- Bolero Smeralda. Für Gitarre solo und Zupforchester. Zimmermann, Frankfurt 1988

=== Recordings ===
- Fernsehwunschkonzert with René Kollo, Deutsche Austrophon, 2006
- Fernsehwunschkonzert with Ingeborg Hallstein, Deutsche Austrophon, 2005
- Freunde, das Leben ist lebenswert, music by Franz Lehár, TIM The International Music Company, Vertrieb, 2003

=== Book ===
- With Dieter Ludwig: Michael und die Tredizianer. Die phantastischen Abenteuer auf einem fremden Planeten. With a greeting from Mildred Scheel, for the benefit of the German Cancer Aid; Ariola-Eurodisc Society, Munich [1974]

Cultural offices
Preceded by Franz Marszalek	Chief Conductor, Kölner Rundfunkorchester; 1968–1995	Succeeded by Helmuth Froschauer
