= The Cousin from Nowhere (1934 film) =

1934 film

- Directed by: Georg Zoch
- Written by: Georg Zoch; Herman Haller (libretto); Fritz Oliven (libretto)
- Produced by: Viktor Klein
- Starring: Lien Deyers; Lizzi Holzschuh; Walter von Lennep; Rudolf Platte
- Cinematography: Bruno Mondi
- Edited by: Else Baum
- Music by: Eduard Künneke
- Production company: Victor Klein-Film
- Distributed by: Rota-Film
- Release date: 11 September 1934
- Running time: 75 minutes
- Country: Nazi Germany
- Language: German

The Cousin from Nowhere (German: Der Vetter aus Dingsda) is a 1934 German operetta film directed by Georg Zoch and starring Lien Deyers, Lizzi Holzschuh and Walter von Lennep. It is based on the 1921 operetta The Cousin from Nowhere composed by Eduard Künneke. It was later turned into a 1953 film of the same title.

== Plot ==
In this operetta adaptation, a young woman waits for her lover in India, while her impatient uncle wants to marry her off without further ado to a rich merchant.

== Cast ==
- Lien Deyers as Julia
- Lizzi Holzschuh as Hannchen
- Walter von Lennep as Hans
- Rudolf Platte as August
- Paul Heidemann as Wildenhagen
- Jakob Tiedtke as Onkel Emil
- Werner Finck as Der Diener Franz
- Hilde Hofer-Pittschau as Die Tante
- Ernst Behmer
- Max Wilmsen
- Luise Morland
- Otto Sauter-Sarto
- Curt Max Richter
- Hans Steinberg
- Eleonore Tappert
