= The Accusing Song =

1936 film

- Directed by: Georg Zoch
- Written by: Georg Zoch
- Produced by: Louis Graveure; Franz Vogel
- Starring: Louis Graveure; Gina Falckenberg; Walter Rilla
- Cinematography: Karl Hasselmann
- Music by: Eduard Künneke
- Production company: Euphono-Film
- Release date: 28 August 1936
- Country: Germany
- Language: German

The Accusing Song (German: Ein Lied klagt an) is a 1936 German musical drama film directed by Georg Zoch and starring Louis Graveure, Gina Falckenberg and Walter Rilla. It was shot at the Tempelhof Studios in Berlin.

== Cast ==
- Louis Graveure as Kammersänger Harden
- Gina Falckenberg as Vera, seine Frau
- Walter Rilla as Detlef Ollmer - Bildhauer
- Walter Janssen as Justus Kramer
- Hanna Waag as Maria, seine Tochter
- Fritz Odemar as Baron Brix
- Margarete Lanner as Baronin Brix
- Erwin Biegel as Josef - Hardens Diener
- Johanna Blum as Anni - Frau Hardens Zofe
- Carla Rust as Emma - Dienstmädchen bei Ollmer
- Herbert Hübner as Kriminalkommissar Collander
- Albert Probeck as Kriminalassistent Breuer
- Georg A. Profé as Kriminalassistent Rothaus
- Gerhard Dammann as Portier Krüger
- Eva Tinschmann as Olga, seine Frau
- Bruno Tillessen as Danneberg

== Bibliography ==
- Moeller, Felix; Schlöndorff, Volker (2000). The Film Minister: Goebbels and the Cinema in the Third Reich. Translated by Robinson, Michael. Stuttgart: Axel Menges. ISBN 978-3-932565-10-6.
- Klaus, Ulrich J. Deutsche Tonfilme: Jahrgang 1936. Klaus-Archiv, 1988.
