= Garry O'Connor (writer) =

English writer

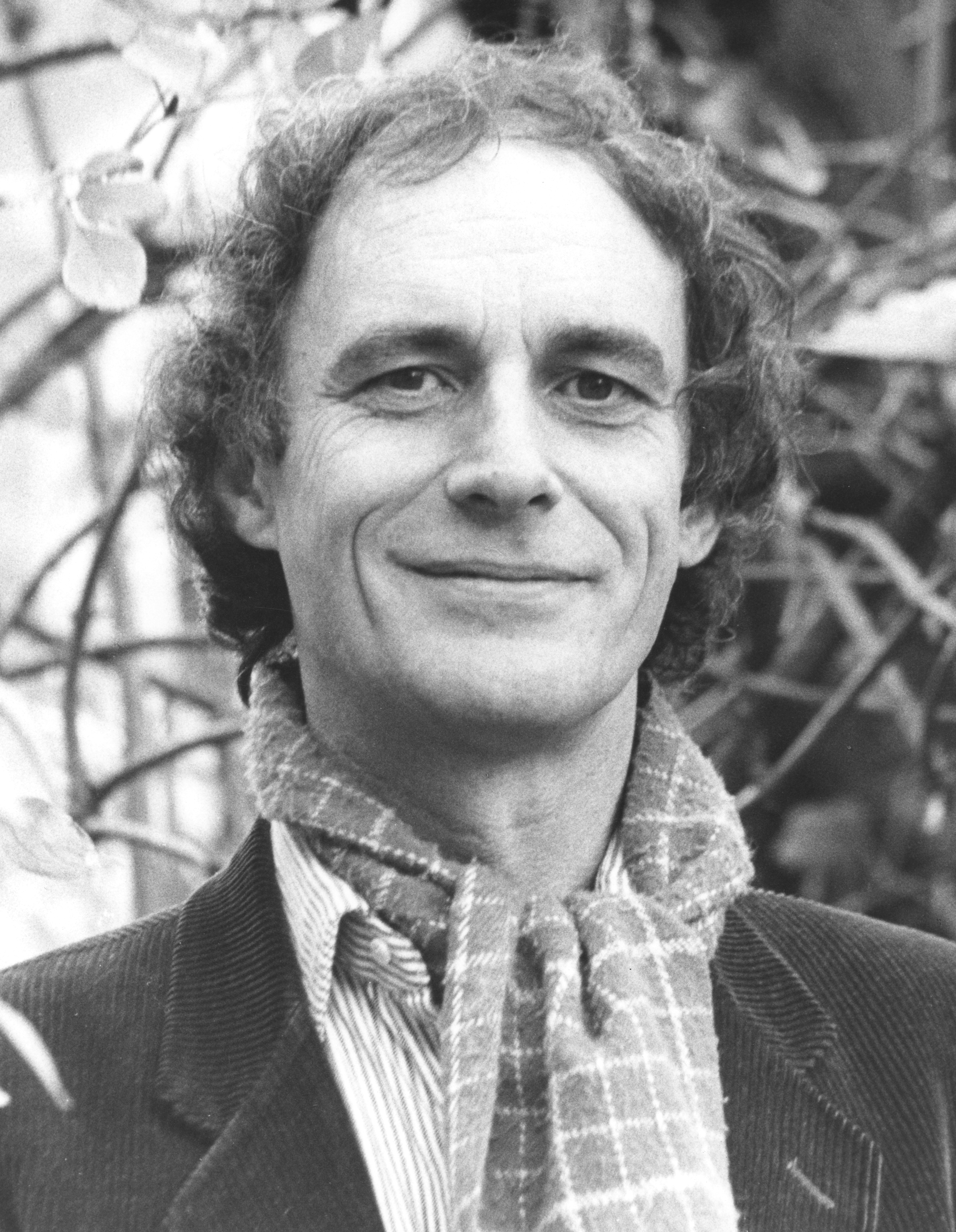
- Garry O'Connor, writer
- Born: 31 January 1938 (age 88); Edgware, London, England
- Education: St Albans School, Hertfordshire; King's College, Cambridge
- Relatives: Cavan O'Connor (father) Rita O'Connor, née Odoli-Tate (mother); Dame Maggie Teyte DBE (great aunt) James W Tate (great uncle)
- Writing career
- Genres: Biography, fiction, plays
- Website: www.garryoconnor.co.uk

Garry O'Connor (born 31 January 1938) is an English playwright, biographer and novelist.

== Personal life ==
Born Edgware, London, England, Garry O'Connor is a biographer and novelist, noted for his publications on theatrical and literary figures.

Son of Cavan O'Connor, Irish tenor, BBC broadcasting star and variety artist, and Rita, also a singer, maiden name Odoli-Tate, O'Connor is the grand-nephew of Dame Maggie Teyte DBE, Croix de Lorraine, Chevalier, Legion d'Honneur, the international opera soprano and interpreter of French song, and of James William Tate, songwriter, accompanist, and composer.

Educated at St Albans School and King's College, Cambridge, where he was an Exhibitioner and State Scholar, and won the James Essay Prize, O'Connor was President of University Actors. He was taught at Cambridge by Professors Boris Ford and John Broadbent, with George Rylands as his Director of Studies, where O'Connor concentrated mainly on directing and writing plays. He is an MA of King's College.

After Cambridge, winning a French Government scholarship to Paris for drama, he studied mime at the École Jacques Le Coq in Paris before joining the Royal Shakespeare Company as Michel Saint-Denis' assistant. This was during the Peter Hall seasons at Stratford Upon Avon. Thereafter he directed plays in London and elsewhere until becoming a full-time writer.

On 25 June 1970 he married Victoria Meredith-Owens, a farmer and yoga teacher. They have six children and six grandchildren. His home is in King's Sutton, Northamptonshire.

== Theatre and media career ==
O'Connor directed his own version of Jonson's Catiline in the Stratford Studio, with Roy Dotrice, Janet Suzman, and directed Jean Tardieu's The Keyhole at the Aldwych Theatre. He directed the 1965 London premiere of Alun Owen's A Little Winter Love at Stratford East ('directed by Garry O'Connor with almost the psychic speed of communication that there can be about jazz': Penelope Gilliatt, Observer); devised and directed A John Whiting Evening, premieres at the Traverse Theatre, Edinburgh, and productions at RADA, the London Drama Centre, and Webber-Douglas School. He also read plays for the RSC and translated plays from French for the RSC, and later for the National Theatre in Olivier's regime.

O'Connor was the first Resident Dramatist and Appeals Director of the Hampstead Theatre Club. He has had eight of his own plays produced, among them: I Learnt in Ipswich How to Poison Flowers (1969), at the Arts Theatre Ipswich, directed by Nick Barter; The Musicians (Mercury Theatre, London, 1970), in which Tom Conti made his first appearance on a London Stage; and Semmelweis at the Edinburgh Festival (1976).

His Dialogue Between Friends at the Open Space was based on his involvement with Arnold Wesker's controversial The Friends, staged at the Roundhouse in 1970. His book Darlings of the Gods was adapted as a three-part mini-series for Thames Television and the Australian Broadcasting Corporation in 1991, and was filmed in Australia. More recently Campion's Ghost, adapted from his novel about John Donne, was performed on Radio 4 (1997), with Paul McGann and Timothy West in the leading roles. He has also written and presented features for Radio 3, and acted as consultant on BBC 1 documentaries on Laurence Olivier and Pope John Paul II, appearing in the latter. After the death of Pope John Paul II, O'Connor appeared on the BBC's Breakfast with Frost on 3 April 2005.

== Writing career ==
In the early 1960s O'Connor wrote a short Daily Mail Charles Greville column, and then became television critic for Queen Magazine 1965–66, succeeding Sir Angus Wilson. He contributed to the Financial Times as its Paris arts correspondent when he lived in Paris, and as a full-time London daily critic (1966–73), regularly writing also for Plays and Players, Theatre Quarterly, the TLS and other periodicals. He has reviewed books and written features, conducted interviews for the Times, Sunday Times, Mail on Sunday and other newspapers.

O'Connor's first book, French Theatre Today, came out in 1976, followed by his first biography, that of his great-aunt, Dame Maggie Teyte (1979), and many more biographies followed; his most recent being Ian McKellen: The Biography (2019). Many have garnered praise and positive reviews; a few have provoked controversy. He is perhaps best known for his theatre biographies - including two of Alec Guinness; Paul Scofield; Ralph Richardson; as well as two books on William Shakespeare, these being his personal favourites and probably his most controversial works (see review citations in the Bibliography below for contemporary critical appraisal). He wrote a controversial biography of Tony and Cherie Blair (The Darlings of Downing Street, 2007), dividing critics from the political right and the left, and also wrote biographies of Pope John Paul II, and Pope Benedict XVI. His 1997 biography of Peggy Ashcroft provoked a storm of anger and controversy within the British Press, with attacks from Harold Pinter, Lord Jeremy Hutchinson, and Labour politician Gerald Kaufman. The book was defended by former Labour Party leader Michael Foot. (Links to press articles in the Bibliography below.)

Some of O'Connor's works have been translated into other languages, including Polish and Swedish.

== Awards, honours ==
French Government Scholarship for Drama; Oxford Experimental Theatre Club, Oxford, 1st Prize in 1974 for I Forget How Nelson Died; Arts Council bursaries for plays I Learnt In Ipswich How to Poison Flowers and Epitaph For a Militant; Arts Council Literature Award, 1979; often cited in Books of the Year by The Times, Sunday Times, Observer.

== Bibliography ==
=== Biography and history ===
- Ian McKellen: The Biography (London: Orion Publishing, 2019 ISBN 9781474608510; New York: St. Martin's Press, 2019 ISBN 9781250223883) Paperback editions 2020
- The Butcher of Poland: Hitler’s Lawyer Hans Frank (The History Press, 2013. Hardback ISBN 9780752498133).
- Subdued Fires: An Intimate Portrait of Pope Benedict XVI (The History Press, 2013. Paperback ISBN 9780752498973).
- The First Household Cavalry Regiment, 1943-44: In the Shadow of Monte Amaro (The History Press, 2013. Hardback ISBN 9780752488578).
- ‘As told to Garry O’Connor’ – Derek Jacobi, As Luck Would Have It (London: HarperCollins, 2013. Hardback ISBN 9780007458875).
- Holy Crosses and Nazi Flags: Benedict and the Roman Catholic Church (Amolibros, 2010). (Part re-published as Subdued Fires; part re-published as The Butcher of Poland).
- The Darlings of Downing Street: the psycho-sexual drama of power (London: Methuen Politicos, 2007. Hardback ISBN 9781842752029).
- Universal Father: A Life of Pope John Paul II (London and New York: Bloomsbury, 2005; paperback 2006).
- Paul Scofield: The Biography (London: Sidgwick & Jackson, 2002; New York: Applause, 2003).
- Alec Guinness, the Unknown: A Life (London: Sidgwick & Jackson, 2002; New York: Applause, 2002).
- William Shakespeare: A Popular Life (new expanded edition) (New York: Applause, 1999).
- The Secret Woman: A Life of Peggy Ashcroft (London: Weidenfeld and Nicolson, 1997).
- Alec Guinness: Master of Disguise (London, Hodder and Stoughton, 1994; Sceptre, 1995).
- William Shakespeare: A Life (London: Hodder and Stoughton, 1991; Sceptre, 1994).
- Sean O’Casey: A Life (London: Hodder and Stoughton, 1988; New York: Atheneum, 1988; Paladin paperback, 1989).
- Darlings of the Gods: One Year in the Lives of Laurence Olivier and Vivien Leigh (London: Hodder and Stoughton, 1984). Also serialised in The Observer and was filmed as a three-part mini-series in Australia by ABC and Thames Television.
- Ralph Richardson: An Actor’s Life (London: Hodder and Stoughton, 1982 Hardback ISBN 0340270411; Coronet paperback 1982; reprinted by London: Methuen Publishing, 1999; and by USA: Applause Theatre and Cinema Books, 2000).
- The Pursuit of Perfection: A Life of Maggie Teyte (London: Victor Gollancz, and New York: Atheneum, 1979).

=== Memoir ===
- The Vagabond Lover: A Father-Son Memoir (CentreHouse Press, 2017. Hardback ISBN 9781902086156).

=== Edited ===
- Olivier: In Celebration (London: Hodder and Stoughton, 1987).

=== Fiction ===
- Death’s Duel, A Novel of John Donne (Lume Books, 2015).
- Love At An End: A Novel of Vivien Leigh and Laurence Olivier (Lume Books, 2015).
- The Book That Kills (Oxford: Aesop Publications, 2014. Hardback ISBN 9780957206175).
- Chaucer’s Triumph, A Novel. Including the Case of Cecilia Chaumpaigne… And Other Offices of the Flesh in the Year 1399 (Petrak Press, 2007. Hardback ISBN 9780955376801).
- Campion’s Ghost: The Sacred and Profane Memories of Donne, Poet (London: Hodder and Stoughton, 1993; Sceptre paperback 1994).

=== Theatre ===
- Le Theatre en Angleterre, French translation by Georgette Illes, (French Information Service, 1968).
- French Theatre Today (London: Pitman, 1976).
- The Mahabharata: Peter Brook’s Epic in the Making (Lume Books, 2015).

=== Plays ===
- Naked Woman: Semmelweis, De Raptu Meo (CentreHouse Press, 2016. Paperback ISBN 9781902086125).
- De Raptu Meo, Geoffrey Chaucer on Trial for Rape, Inner Temple Hall, 2014.
- Debussy Was My Grandfather / The Madness of Vivien Leigh – Two Plays (CentreHouse Press, 2012).
- Campion’s Ghost (1998 BBC 4 play adapted by O’Conner from the 1994 novel of the same name).
- Dialogue between Friends (one-act), produced in London, England, 1976.
- Semmelweis (two-act), produced in Edinburgh, Scotland at the Edinburgh Festival, 1975.
- Different Circumstances (two-act), produced in Oxford, England, 1974.
- I Learnt in Ipswich How to Poison Flowers (two-act), produced in Ipswich, England, 1969.
- The Musicians (two-act), produced in London, England 1969.
