= Louis Graveure =

English actor and baritone singer known as "The Mystery Man"

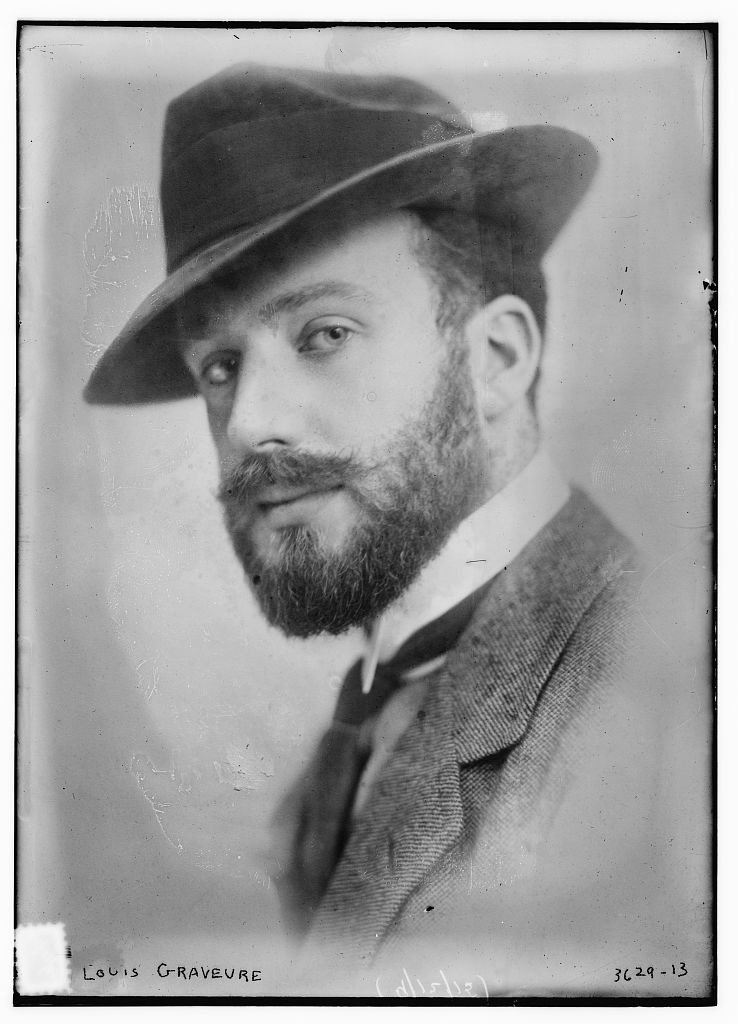
- Graveure circa 1910
- Born: Wilfrid Douthitt; 18 March 1888; London, England
- Died: 27 April 1965 (aged 77); San Francisco, California, U.S.

Signature
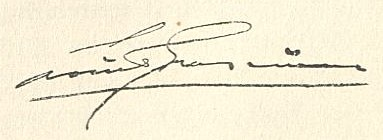

Louis Graveure (18 March 1888 – 27 April 1965) was an English actor and baritone singer known as "The Mystery Man".

== Biography ==
He was born on March 18, 1888, in London, England, as Wilfrid Douthitt. He trained under Clara Novello Davies. He made his New York City debut in 1914 in The Lilac Domino. In 1915 he took on the persona of a new singer called Louis Graveure. People asked him if he was the same person as Wilfrid Douthitt, and he denied it and invented a backstory, saying Graveure was from Belgium.

He married Eleanor Painter in 1916 and they divorced in 1930. He gave a recital in 1947 at The Town Hall in Manhattan, as well as other recitals accompanied by pianist Alice Marion Shaw.

He died on 27 April 1965 in San Francisco, California, under the name "Louis Graveure".

== Films ==
- There Is Only One Love (1933)
- Interlanguage link multi (1933)
- Interlanguage link multi (1934)
- Ich sehne mich nach dir (1934)
- The Accusing Song (1936)
