= Marguerite Debreux =

French actress

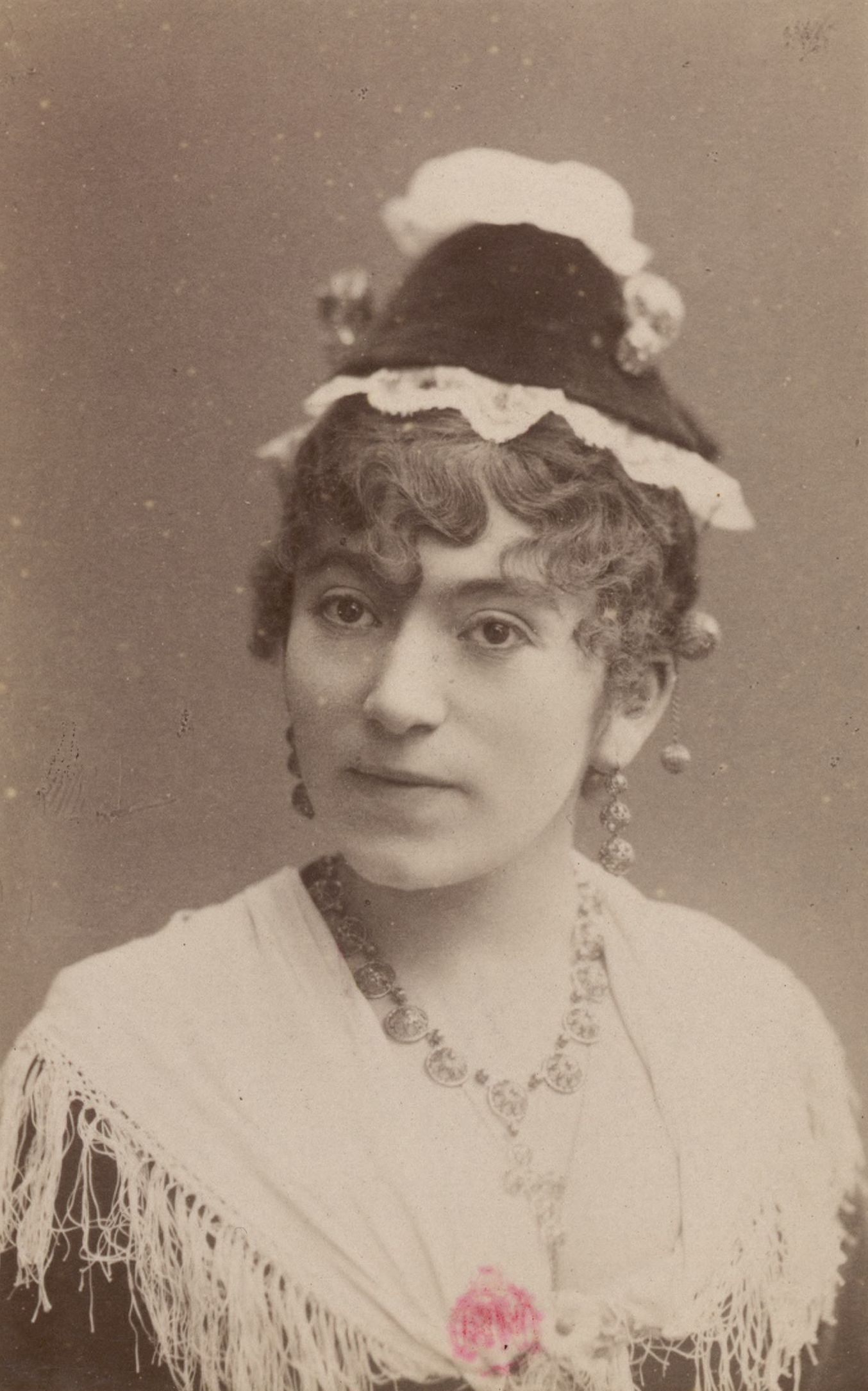
Marguerite Debreux

Marguerite Terdie or Terdy (5 Jun 1851–23 Jun 1917), known as Marguerite Debreux, was a French actress, lyric artist, and courtesan of the 19th century.

== Life ==
She made her debut at the Théâtre du Châtelet in 1868.

In London, she sang the repertoire of Offenbach and Hervé in 1870-1871. She was the mistress of Gabriel Hugelmann, who subsidized the theatre to which she was attached.

She was hired at the Bouffes-Parisiens in 1871 where she was to debut in Le Corsaire Noir.

In 1873, she met the coulissier Camille Bloch, of whom she became the mistress and with whom she lived for 25 years from 1874 to 1899, and who, on her advice, left the theatre to devote himself to his love affairs.

Hugelmann, seeking revenge, publicly denounced the presence of his former mistress at the time of the searches in the lupanar of the rue de Suresnes, a gallant refuge for theatre girls and young ladies who used to go there in secret from their lovers. Debreux, along with about 20 fellow artists, including Alice Regnault, Méry Laurent, and Gabrielle Roux, sued Hugelmann for slander. Despite his exoneration, this episode remained attached to his name long after the fact.

She played at the Théâtre du Palais-Royal and the Théâtre des Nouveautés in 1880.

Her furniture and objets d'art were put on sale in 1906.

== Some roles ==
- 1868: La Poudre de Perlinpinpin, féerie by the Cogniard brothers, as Cupidon, at Théâtre du Châtelet.
- 1870: Le Petit Faust, opéra bouffe, by Hervé as Méphistophélès at Lyceum Theatre, London.
- 1871: La princesse de Trébizonde, by Offenbach, as Régina, revival at Bouffes-Parisiens, 15 September.
- 1871: Le testament de Monsieur de Crac, operetta by Charles Lecocq, as Thibaude, at the Bouffes-Parisiens, 23 October.
- 1872: Le Serpent à plumes, opéra bouffe, by Léo Delibes, revival at Bouffes-Parisiens.
- 1872: La Timbale d'argent, opéra bouffe, by Léon Vasseur after a libretto by Adolphe Jaime and Jules Noriac, as Fichtel, creation at the Bouffes-Parisiens, 9 April.
- 1873: La Rosière d'ici, by Léon Roques, at the Théâtre des Bouffes-Parisiens, 27 March
- 1873: La Leçon d'amour, by Livrat and Watchs.
- 1873: La Quenouille de Verre, by Charles Grisart, as Lucette, at the Bouffes-Parisiens, 7 November.
- 1875: La Cruche cassée, by Léon Vasseur, travesti role of Louis XV, at Théâtre Taitbout.
- 1876: Le Roi d'Yvetot, opéra bouffe by Léon Vasseur, at Theatre Taitbout
- 1878: La Timbale d'argent, revival at Bouffes-Parisiens.
- 1880: La Cantinière, operetta by Robert Planquette, as Musardin, at Théâtre des Nouveautés, 26 October.
- 1882: Le Jour et la Nuit, operetta by Charles Lecocq, as Sanchette, at Tthéâtre des Nouveautés.
