= Fritz Grasshoff =

German painter

Fritz Graßhoff
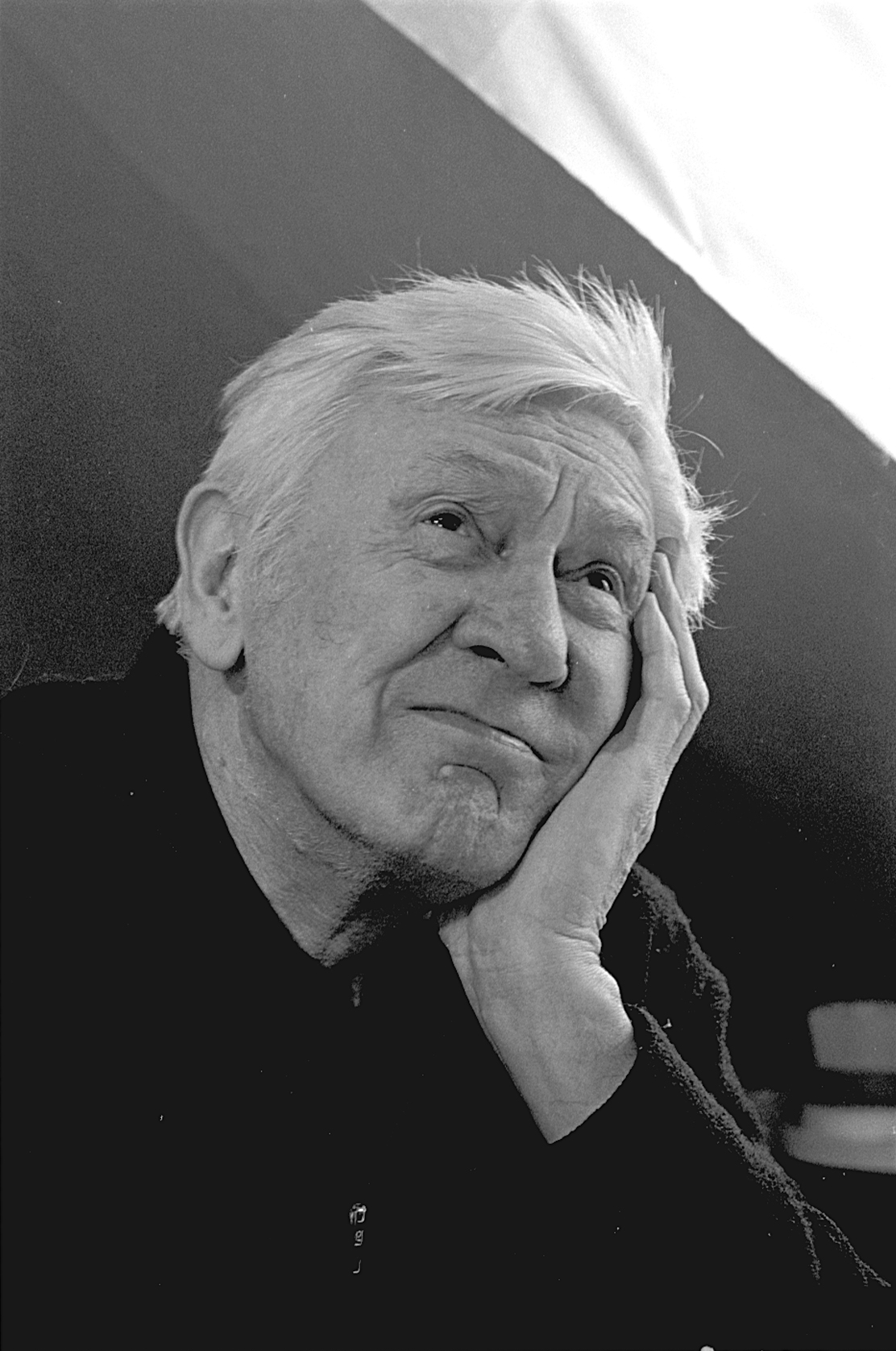
- Graßhoff in 1984
- Born: 9 December 1913; Quedlinburg
- Died: 9 February 1997 (aged 83); Hudson, Quebec
- Occupations: Painter; Poet; Songwriter
- Works: Halunkenpostille

Fritz Graßhoff (9 December 1913 – 9 February 1997) was a German painter, poet and songwriter. He was known for hits sung by Lale Andersen, Freddy Quinn and Hans Albers. As a painter, he participated in important exhibitions; as a writer, he was known for his lyric volume Halunkenpostille and his autobiographical novel Der blaue Heinrich. He translated poetry by the Ancient Roman Martial and the Swede Carl Michael Bellman. Many of his writings have been set to music by composers such as James Last, Norbert Schultze and Siegfried Strohbach.

== Life ==
Graßhoff was born and spent his youth in Quedlinburg, Saxony-Anhalt, where his father, a former sailor, worked as a coal merchant and farmer. Traces of the rugged environment later appeared in his ballads and songs. He attended the "Humanistisches Gymnasium", learning Greek and Latin. After his Abitur (college entrance exam) in 1933, he began an apprenticeship as a church painter. Later, he was involved in journalism. In 1938, he was drafted into the military and fought in World War II against Russia, later falling into British captivity. He wrote his first collection of poems in captivity in 1945.

From 1946 to 1967, he lived in Celle, Lower Saxony. He traveled extensively to Greece and, from 1956, regularly to Sweden. In 1947, he published his most famous collection of ballads, songs and poems, the Halunkenpostille, which sold more than 300,000 copies. His paintings were first shown in Celle in 1947, then in 1954 in his first important art exhibit at the kestnergesellschaft in Hannover along with works by Max Beckmann and Paul Klee. His work was purchased by the Kunsthalle Hamburg and the Lehmbruck Museum in Duisburg. However, his income came primarily from his lyrics for pop songs. He wrote several hits for singers, such as Lale Andersen, Freddy Quinn and Hans Albers, for whom he wrote "Nimm mich mit, Kapitän, auf die Reise" ("Take me along, captain, on your trip"). In addition to his often crude songs and ballads, set to music by such composers as Heinz Gietz, James Last, Lotar Olias, Wolfgang Schulz, Norbert Schultze and Siegfried Strohbach, he translated from Greek, from Latin, including texts by the Roman Martial, and from Swedish, with works by the national poet, Carl Michael Bellman.

In 1967, Graßhoff moved to Zwingenberg. He stayed away from the literary world because he felt that his reputation was primarily from his hit lyrics. When his biographical novel, Der blaue Heinrich, was published in 1980, it received little attention.

In 1983, he and his family left Germany for Canada, where he spent the last 13 years of his life at his home on the Ottawa River. He died in Hudson, Quebec. His late poetry brought him a respected place in the literary world, reflected in numerous essays. His paintings are held by museums, such as the Wallraf-Richartz-Museum. In Celle, an archive is kept at the Bomann Museum, his atelier in the garden of his home still exists, and the street Fritz-Grasshoff-Gasse (Note: Grasshoff is an alternate spelling for Graßhoff. The German letter, "ß" can be written as a double-s, if the special character is unavailable. Non-Germans often mistake the letter for a B; Graßhoff may have changed the way he wrote his name after moving to Canada.) is named after him.

== Selected works ==
=== Literary works ===
- Zeltlieder und Barackenverse. J.M. Klopp, Lütjenburg/Holstein 1945
- Das Heiligenhafener Sternsingerspiel 1945. J.A. Keune, Hamburg 1946.
- Halunkenpostille. J.A. Keune. Hamburg 1947
- Das Gemeindebrett. Allgemein-ungültiger Jahresweiser für Landleute. Lange. Duisburg 1954
- Im Flug zerfallen die Wege der Vögel. Gedichte. Lange, Duisburg 1956
- Die klassische Halunkenpostille. Epigramme und Satiren. Kiepenheuer & Witsch. Köln/Berlin 1964
- Graßhoffs unverblümtes Lieder- und Lästerbuch. Kiepenheuer & Witsch. Köln/Berlin 1965
- Der neue Salomo. Eine Art Predigt an der Straßenecke. Edition Esplanade. Hamburg 1965
- Carl Michael Bellman. Durch alle Himmel alle Gossen. Ein Bündel Fredmanscher Episteln und Songs. Aus dem Schwedischen singbar ins Deutsche gebracht. Kiepenheuer & Witsch. Köln/Berlin 1966
- Der singende Knochen. Kurzgelochte Parahistorie zur echten Flötenforschung. Edition Edition Moeck. Celle 1971
- Seeräuber-Report. Songs, Lieder & Balladen. Erdmann. Tübingen/Basel 1972. ISBN 3-7711-0142-5
- Philodemos und die antike Hintertreppe. 20 griechisch–römische Autoren neu übersetzt und umhost mit Graphiken des Autors. Eremiten-Presse. Düsseldorf 1975 ISBN 3-87365-079-1
- Foxy rettet Amerika. Ein Musical für Kinder von 8-80 (a musical for children from 8 to 80). Schott. Mainz 1976
- Der blaue Heinrich. novel, Nymphenburger. München 1980. ISBN 3-485-00388-3
- Prosit ein Leben lang. Wollust & Müßiggang. Carl Michael Bellman, Episteln & Songs. Fritz Graßhoff, Nachdichtungen. Edition Handpresse Gutsch. Berlin 1985. ISBN 3-924993-09-2
- Les animaux en pantalons. Tiere in Hosen. Eine Auswahl aus Menschenfabeln. (animals in trousers, fables) Éditions du Silenoe. Montréal 1991
- Bellman auf Deutsch. Fredmans Episteln. Aus dem Schwedischen des 18. Jahrhunderts singbar ins Deutsche gerückt. (Bellman in German) Verlag für Berlin-Brandenburg. Potsdam 1995. ISBN 3-930850-10-9
- Martial für Zeitgenossen. Epigramme von Marcus Valerius Martialis. Eremiten Presse. Düsseldorf 1998. ISBN 3-87365-315-X
- Von der Wichtigkeit der Dinge. Heritage Fritz Graßhoff / Stiftung. Deutsches Kabarettarchiv. Mainz 2003
- Satire. Preface by Roswitha Grasshoff, postscript by Pierre Filion. German and French. Éditions du Silence. Montreal 2007. ISBN 978-2-920180-71-0

=== Picture books, exhibition catalogs ===
- Bilder und Zeichnungen von Fritz Graßhoff. Städtisches Kulturamt. Celle 1947
- Gerhard Händler: Fritz Grasshoff. Städt. Kunstmuseum Duisburg. Museumsverein. Duisburg 1956
- Paintings, Peintures, Gemälde 1984–1986. Montreal (Kanada)
- Graphik − Graphic − Graphique. 1943–1993. Éditions Vaudreuil [Canada] 1993

=== Recordings and music books ===
- Halunkensongs for baritone, trompet, violin, akkordeon, double bass and percussion. music: Siegfried Strohbach, sheet music: Breitkopf & Härtel 1956
- Großer Kalender (after texts from "Das Gemeindebrett") for male choir, piano and large orchestra. music: Siegfried Strohbach, sheet music: Breitkopf & Härtel 1961
- Songs für Mündige. arranged by Hans Last (James Last). with Lotar Olias, Lale Andersen and others. Polydor. Hamburg 1965
- Halunkenpostille. Schräge Songs, halbseidene Lieder und wunderschöne Gedichte. music by Hans-Martin Majewski and Norbert Schultze. spoken and sung by Hanne Wieder, Hannelore Schroth, Gustav Knuth, Gisela aus Schwabing, Kirsten Heiberg, Ralf Bendix, Jens Brenke, Inge Brandenburg, Werner Schmalenbach and Fritz Graßhoff. Electrola. Köln 1967
- Unerhörte Chansons. voice: Illo Schieder, orchestra: Bert Grund. MPS 15108. Villingen 1968
- Warehouse-Life. Chor-Revue. music by Peter Seeger. Schott. Mainz 1972
- Seeräuber-Report. Heinz Reincke, Ingrid van Bergen, Günter Pfitzmann, Hannes Messemer and others. Electrola. Köln 1973; CD: Conträr Musik 2004
- Fritz Grasshoff's Unartige Lieder. Songs und maulfaule Balladen + Badewannenlieder für Mündige und Dickfellige unter Musik gesetzt von Lotar Olias. spoken and sung by Helmut Brasch, Inge Meysel, Ernst Stankovski, Gustav Knuth, Lothar Olias, Mal Sondock, Edith Hancke, Eckart Dux, Lale Andersen, Günter Jerschke, Erich Uhland, und Hanne Wieder. Intercord 720-08
- Foxy rettet Amerika. musical by Heinz Geese. EMI-Electrola. Köln 1977
- Süverkrüp singt Graßhoffs Bellman (Süverkrüp sings Graßhoff's Bellman), Conträr Musik 1996
- Hört mal her, ihr Zeitgenossen. Black und Pit. for Graßhoff's 90th birthday. Conträr Musik 2003

== Selected exhibitions ==
- 1954 kestnergesellschaft, Hannover
- 1956 Städtisches Kunstmuseum, Duisburg
- 1961 Studio für neue Kunst, Wuppertal-Elberfeld
- 1970 Kunstverein, Celle
- 1991 Stewart Hall, Montréal (Kanada)
- 1991 Goethe-Institut, Montréal (Kanada)
- 2003 Schlossmuseum, Quedlinburg

== Literature ==
- Oskar Ansull: Und fliege in die Fremde. In: Von Dichterfürsten und anderen Poeten. Kleine niedersächsische Literaturgeschichte. Band III. Hannover 1996, ISBN 3-927715-30-1.
- Friedrich Zehm: Ein Bündel Chanson. In: The Musical Times Nr. 1519. Berkhamsted 1969, ISSN 0027-4666.
- Eva Demski: Vagabund, Bänkelsänger, Malerpoet, Klabautermann. In: FAZ 22 December 1989.
- Ralf Busch: Fritz Graßhoff – Maler und Poet. Bomann-Museum, Celle 1993, ISBN 3-925902-18-X.
- Maria Katharina Grote: Fritz Graßhoff – eine Bildmonographie. Diplomarbeit, Universität Hildesheim 1997.
- Jacques Outin: Graßhoff, Bellman und Schweden. In: Muschelhaufen. Nr. 44. Viersen 2004, ISSN 0085-3593.
- Wolfgang Ries: Gebrauchsware und Unnützes. Einige subjektive Anmerkungen zu Person und Werk von Fritz Graßhoff. In: Muschelhaufen. Nr. 44. Viersen 2004, ISSN 0085-3593.
- Eva Demski: Fritz Grasshoff – Der letzte Klabautermann. In: Land und Leute. Schöffling, Frankfurt/M. 1994, ISBN 3-89561-000-3.

== See also ==
- List of German painters
