= Cavan O'Connor =

British tenor (1899–1997)

- Also known as: Harry Carlton; Terence O'Brien; Allan O'Sullivan etc.
- Born: Clarence Patrick O'Connor; 1 July 1899; Carlton, Nottinghamshire, England
- Died: 11 January 1997 (aged 97) London, England
- Genres: Traditional pop, opera
- Occupation: Singer
- Years active: Mid-1920s –1980s
- Children: 3 sons, including Garry O'Connor (writer)

Clarence Patrick O'Connor (1 July 1899 – 11 January 1997), known professionally as Cavan O'Connor, was a British singer of Irish heritage who was most popular in the 1930s and 1940s, when he was billed as "The Singing Vagabond" or "The Vagabond Lover".

== Life and career ==
He was born in Carlton, Nottinghamshire, England, to parents of Irish origin. His father died when he was young, and he left school at an early age to work in the printing trade. He served in the First World War as a gunner and signaller in the Royal Artillery, after first being rejected by the Royal Navy when it was discovered that he had pretended to be three years older than his real age. He was wounded in the war, aged 16, while serving with the Royal Artillery. After the war he returned to Nottingham where he worked in a music shop. He started singing in clubs and at concerts, before deciding to turn professional in the early 1920s.

He won a scholarship to the Royal College of Music in London, where he met his wife, Rita Tate (real name Margherita Odoli), a niece of the opera singer Maggie Teyte. He made his first recordings, as Cavan O'Connor, for the Vocalion label in 1925, including "I'm Only a Strolling Vagabond" from the operetta The Cousin from Nowhere, which became his signature song. Noted for his fine tenor voice, well suited for recording, he appeared on many dance band recordings in the 1920s and 1930s, and used a wide variety of pseudonyms, including Harry Carlton, Terence O'Brien, and Allan O'Sullivan. He also joined Nigel Playfair's revue company at the Lyric Theatre in Hammersmith, before moving on to playing lead roles in opera productions at the Old Vic, often performing in French, Italian and Spanish.

He turned increasingly towards light entertainment, largely for financial reasons. He started appearing in variety shows around the country, often performing Irish folk songs. Having made his first radio broadcasts for the BBC in 1926, he continued to feature occasionally, but made his breakthrough when he was billed, initially anonymously, as "The Strolling Vagabond" and "The Vagabond Lover" on a series of radio programmes produced by Eric Maschwitz in 1935. This was the first British radio series based around a solo singer, and when it became known that he was the performer, made O'Connor a star, "one of Britain’s highest paid radio personalities". The series continued for over ten years. From 1946, his Sunday lunchtime radio series, The Strolling Vagabond, was heard by up to 14 million listeners.

O'Connor consistently toured and continued to broadcast regularly. During the Second World War he settled in Bangor, north Wales, and regularly appeared on the Irish Half Hour radio programmes. His most popular songs included "The World Is Mine Tonight", written for O'Connor by Maschwitz and George Posford; "Danny Boy"; and "I'll Take You Home Again, Kathleen", an American song widely assumed to be Irish. He recorded frequently for at least 15 record labels over his career, including Decca Records, at one point recording 40 songs in five days. He made over 800 recordings in total, both under his own name and pseudonyms, and also appeared in two films, Ourselves Alone (1936) and Under New Management (known in the U.S. as Honeymoon Hotel, 1946).

After the war, he returned to live in London, and toured in Australia and South Africa as well as in Don Ross's Thanks for the Memory tours. He retired at one point to set up an electrical goods business, but then resumed his music career in the Avonmore Trio with his wife and son, to give occasional performances and make recordings, the last in 1984.

He died in London in 1997, aged 97.
