= Georg Zoch =

German screenwriter and film director

- Born: 2 September 1902; Danzig, German Empire
- Died: 31 March 1944 (aged 41); Berlin, Nazi Germany
- Occupations: Screenwriter; Film director
- Years active: 1933-1944 (film)

Georg Zoch (2 September 1902 – 31 March 1944) was a German screenwriter and film director. Zoch worked on a number of Nazi propaganda films, including his screenplay for The Degenhardts (1944).

== Selected filmography ==
=== Director ===
- The Black Forest Girl (1933)
- Love Conquers All (1934)
- Everyone Jumps At My Command (1934)
- The Accusing Song (1936)
- Desire for Africa (1939)

=== Screenwriter ===
- The Tsarevich (1933)
- Bon Voyage (1933)
- Paganini (1934)
- The Cousin from Nowhere (1934)
- Heaven on Earth (1935)
- Every Day Isn't Sunday (1935)
- Orders Are Orders (1936)
- The Merry Wives (1936)
- His Best Friend (1937)
- Nanon (1938)
- The Curtain Falls (1939)
- Police Report (1939)
- Twelve Minutes After Midnight (1939)
- U-Boote westwärts (1941)
- People in the Storm (1941)
- Kohlhiesel's Daughters (1943)
- A Man for My Wife (1943)
- The Degenhardts (1944)

== Bibliography ==
- Bock, Hans-Michael & Bergfelder, Tim. The Concise CineGraph. Encyclopedia of German Cinema. Berghahn Books, 2009.
- Richards, Jeffrey. Visions of Yesterday. Routledge, 1973.
