= Friedrich Zehm =

German classical composer

- Born: 22 January 1922; Neusalz
- Died: 4 December 2007 (aged 85); Wiesbaden
- Education: Mozarteum; Hochschule für Musik Freiburg
- Occupations: Music educator; Pianist; Composer
- Organization: Schott

Friedrich Zehm (22 January 1923 – 4 December 2007) was a German classical composer.

== Life ==
Zehm was born in Neusalz in Lower Silesia. He received first piano lessons by the composer Hansmaria Dombrowski in Stettin when he was 8 years old. In 1941, he began studies at the Mozarteum in Salzburg with Walter Lampe (composer) (piano) and Friedrich Frischenschlager (theory). He continued after the war at the Hochschule für Musik Freiburg with Harald Genzmer (composition) and Edith Picht-Axenfeld (piano). From 1952 to 1956, he worked as a private music teacher, pianist and composer, from 1956 to 1963 he was responsible for music at the Amerika-Haus in Freiburg, and from 1963 to 1985 as an editor and for the music publishing house Schott in Mainz. He died on 4 December 2007 in Wiesbaden.

== Work ==
His career as a composer spanned from 1950 to 2007. He wrote some 200 works, focused on chamber music. He also wrote vocal music, especially songs and song cycles. He composed orchestral works, concertos, music for piano, organ and harpsichord, a few works for theater, radio plays and film, educational literature, works for school orchestras and amateur orchestras. He published arrangements of international folklore under a pen name.

As a student of Harald Genzmer and in the wake of Paul Hindemith, Bartók and Stravinsky, Zehm composed in extended tonality. His music includes elements of avant-garde, connected to traditional formal elements. His music shows formally clear and concise structure, using traditional forms such as fugue and rondo, catchy, concise and rhythmically profiled themes, and dancing rhythm. He composed Grasshoffiade, four songs on lyrics by Fritz Grasshoff for men's choir. His Mass Deutsche Messe mit Einheitsliedern was premiered on 15 September 1968 in Wiesbaden by the Chor von St. Bonifatius and members of the Hessisches Staatsorchester, conducted by Peter Kempin.

=== Selected works ===
- Sonata for viola and piano (1949)
- Duo for violin and viola (1954)
- Präludium for viola solo (1954)
- Allegro concertante for large orchestra (1959)
- Lyrische Kantate (Lyrical Cantata) after Julius Bissier for baritone and orchestra (1964/65)
- Deutsche Messe mit Einheitsliedern (German Mass with Hymns) for mixed choir, six brass instruments and congregational singing (1965)
- Capriccio for percussion and chamber orchestra (1968)
- Schwierigkeiten & Unfälle mit 1 Choral (Difficulties and Accidents with 1 Chorale) for a conductor and ten wind players (1974)
- Albumblatt (Album Leaf) for viola and piano (1980)
- Rhapsodische Sonate for violin and piano (1982)
- Divertimento armonico for accordion orchestra (1985)
- Drei Elegien (3 Elegies) for viola and piano (1987)
- 6 Impromptus for clarinet and viola (1987–1988)
- Klavierbuch für die Jugend (Piano Book for the Young) (1988)
- Inventionen for piano (2007)

== Literature ==
- Heidrun Miller: Friedrich Zehm. Komponist zwischen Tradition und Moderne, in Schriften zur Musikwissenschaft 8, Musikwissenschaftliches Institut der Johannes Gutenberg-Universität Mainz 2003 (in German)
- Heidrun Miller: Zur Kammermusik von Friedrich Zehm, in: Kristin Pfarr, Karl Böhmer, Christoph-Hellmut Mahling (ed.), Teil 1 Kammermusik an Rhein und Main. Teil 2 Beiträge zur Geschichte des Streichquartetts, Mainz 2007
