= Bon Voyage (1933 film) =

1933 film

- Directed by: Alfred Abel
- Written by: Bobby E. Lüthge; Georg Zoch
- Produced by: Viktor Klein
- Starring: Magda Schneider; Max Hansen; Ekkehard Arendt
- Cinematography: A. O. Weitzenberg
- Music by: Eduard Künneke
- Production company: Victor Klein-Film
- Distributed by: Metropol-Filmverleih
- Release date: 27 November 1933
- Running time: 83 minutes
- Country: Germany
- Language: German

Bon Voyage (German: Glückliche Reise) is a 1933 German musical comedy film directed by Alfred Abel and starring Magda Schneider, Ekkehard Arendt and Max Hansen. It was shot at the EFA Studios in Berlin. The film's sets were designed by the art director Manfred Hoermann. Based on Eduard Künneke's 1932 operetta Glückliche Reise, it is an operetta film, a genre that was enjoying popularity at the time. It was filmed again in 1954.

== Cast ==
- Magda Schneider as Monika Brink
- Carla Carlsen as Lona Vonderhoff
- Max Hansen as Stefan Schwarzenberg
- Ekkehard Arendt as Robert Hartenau
- Paul Henckels as Fritz Homann
- Adele Sandrock as Tante Henriette
- Hugo Fischer-Köppe as Kapitän Brangersen
- Margarete Kupfer as Frau Maschke

== Bibliography ==
- Goble, Alan. The Complete Index to Literary Sources in Film. Walter de Gruyter, 1999.
- Klaus, Ulrich J. Deutsche Tonfilme: Jahrgang 1933. Klaus-Archiv, 1988.
- Waldman, Harry. Nazi Films In America, 1933–1942. McFarland & Co, 2008.
