= Siegfried Strohbach =

German composer and conductor (1929–2019)

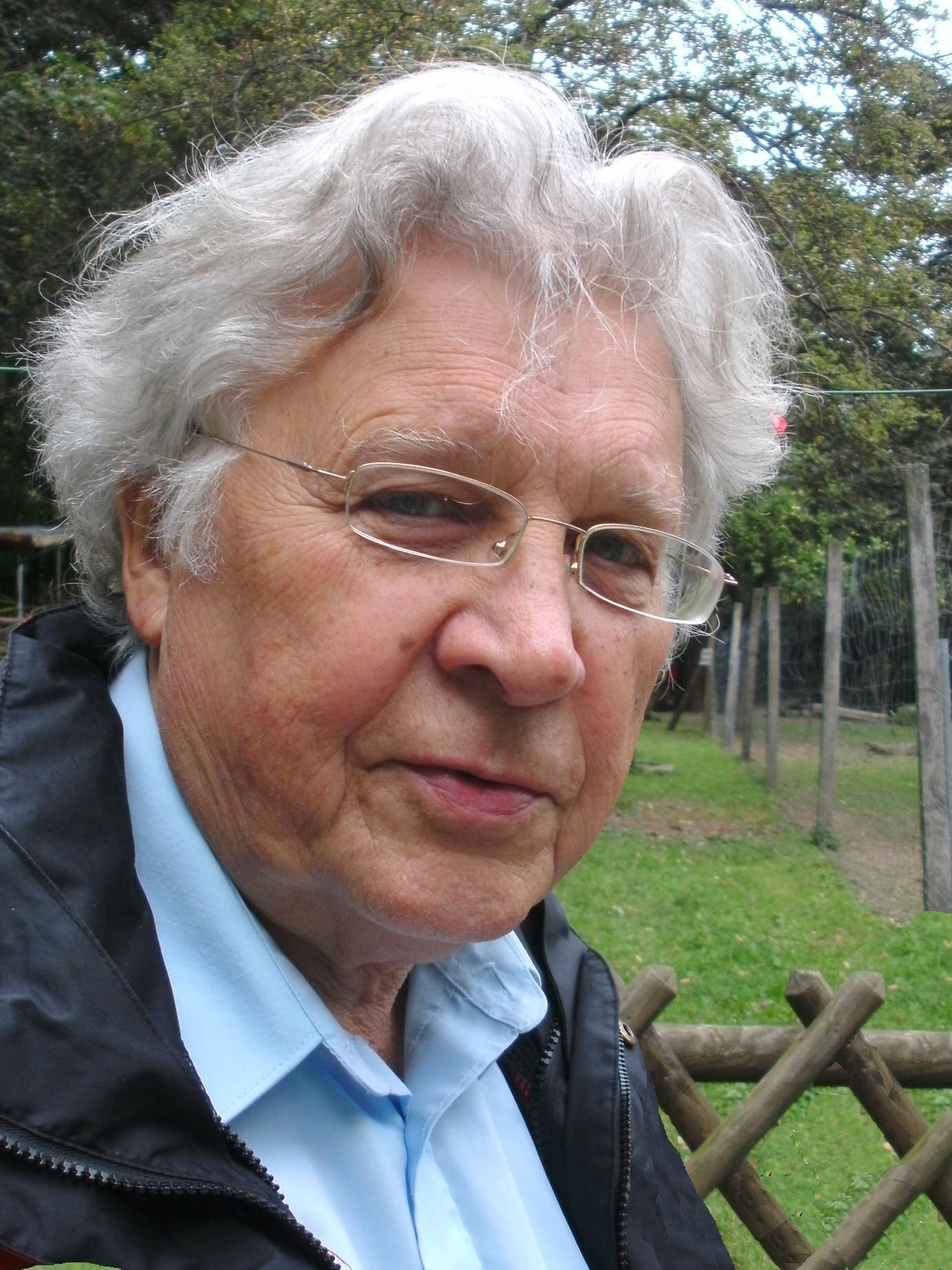
- Strohbach in 2011
- Born: 27 November 1929; Schirgiswalde, Saxony
- Died: 11 July 2019 (aged 89)
- Occupations: Composer; Choral conductor; Academic teacher
- Organizations: Musikhochschule Hannover

Siegfried Strohbach (27 November 1929 – 11 July 2019) was a German composer and conductor. He founded and directed choirs and the vocal ensemble Collegium Cantorum and is notable for the composition of choral music. He was a conductor of major theaters of Lower Saxony and a professor of the Musikhochschule Hannover as well as a composer.

== Biography ==
Siegfried Strohbach began having piano lessons at the age of five. From 1939 to 1945, he was a student of the Musisches Gymnasium (high school with music as a main course) in Frankfurt with a major in piano. He studied composition with its founder and director Kurt Thomas. From 1946 to 1949 he continued his studies in composition and conducting with Thomas privately, and studied the piano with August Leopolder.

From 1947 to 1949 he worked as a Korrepetitor (coach) at the Oper Frankfurt. In 1949 he moved to Hanover, where he studied singing with Paul Gümmer at the Landesmusikschule. As a choral conductor, he took under his wing several amateur choirs in and around Hanover. During this time he wrote his first successful compositions, including the premiere of his chamber opera Die Wette, and made initial contact with the publisher Breitkopf & Härtel. From 1951 to 1953 he was Kapellmeister for plays at the Landestheater (now Staatstheater Hannover). In 1953 he founded the choir "Propsteichor Hannover" and also the "Collegium Cantorum", a semiprofessional ensemble which became known through concerts and broadcasts. He was to direct the group until 1982.

From 1953 to 1966 Strohbach was a music teacher at the gymnasium St. Ursula in Hanover, but continued to work as a freelancer at the theater Landesbühne, which covers performances all over Lower Saxony, from 1951 to 1993. During that time he wrote incidental music for the stage, some 40 pieces. From 1966 he was lecturer in music theory at the Musikhochschule Hannover, where he was appointed professor in 1973, teaching until his retirement in 1994. Parallel to teaching, Strohbach was from 1967 to 1984 Kapellmeister of the Landesbühne and conducted opera and concert at the festival "Musik und Theater in Herrenhausen" in the Baroque Herrenhausen Gardens, including works of Monteverdi, Mozart, and particularly Handel.

== Works and awards ==
Strohbach composed numerous sacred and secular choral works for a variety of ensembles, also chamber music, works for piano, songs, stage music, even Spanish folk music, among others. His works were published by Breitkopf and Härtel, Wiesbaden, Edition Ferrimontana, Frankfurt, Möseler Verlag, Wolfenbüttel, and Strube-Verlag, Munich.

In 1994 he was awarded the Niedersächsischer Kunstpreis (Art Prize of Lower Saxony).

=== Selected works ===
- Denn der Herr ist nahe, symphonic cantata for soprano, baritone, mixed choir and large orchestra
- Missa beatae Virginis, (Mass of the Blessed Virgin) for soprano solo, female choir and organ
- Johannes-Passion (Passion after John) for solo voice and mixed choir a cappella, Möseler 2001
- 6 Evangelien-Motetten (6 Gospel motets) for mixed choir a cappella
- Großer Kalender (Great calendar) on texts by Fritz Graßhoff for male choir, piano and large orchestra
- Eichendorff-Serenade after Joseph von Eichendorff for mixed choir and three instruments
- Viva la musica, cantata for baritone solo, six-part mixed choir, strings and percussion, Möseler 1984
- Max & Moritz, cantata on Wilhelm Busch's Max and Moritz for mixed choir and piano
- 5 Trinklieder (5 drinking songs) after old texts, for baritone solo, male choir and piano
- 5 Galgenlieder after Christian Morgenstern for four-part male chorus a cappella
- Tanz rüber - tanz nüber, Eine Rundreise mit europäischen Tanzliedern (A round trip with European dancing songs) for female choir, piano and percussion
- Der Stern aus Jakob (The star from Jacob), cantata for Epiphany, from the cantata cycle Auf dem Weg (In the way), for baritone solo, mixed choir, oboe and organ, Strube 2005

=== Performances and recordings ===
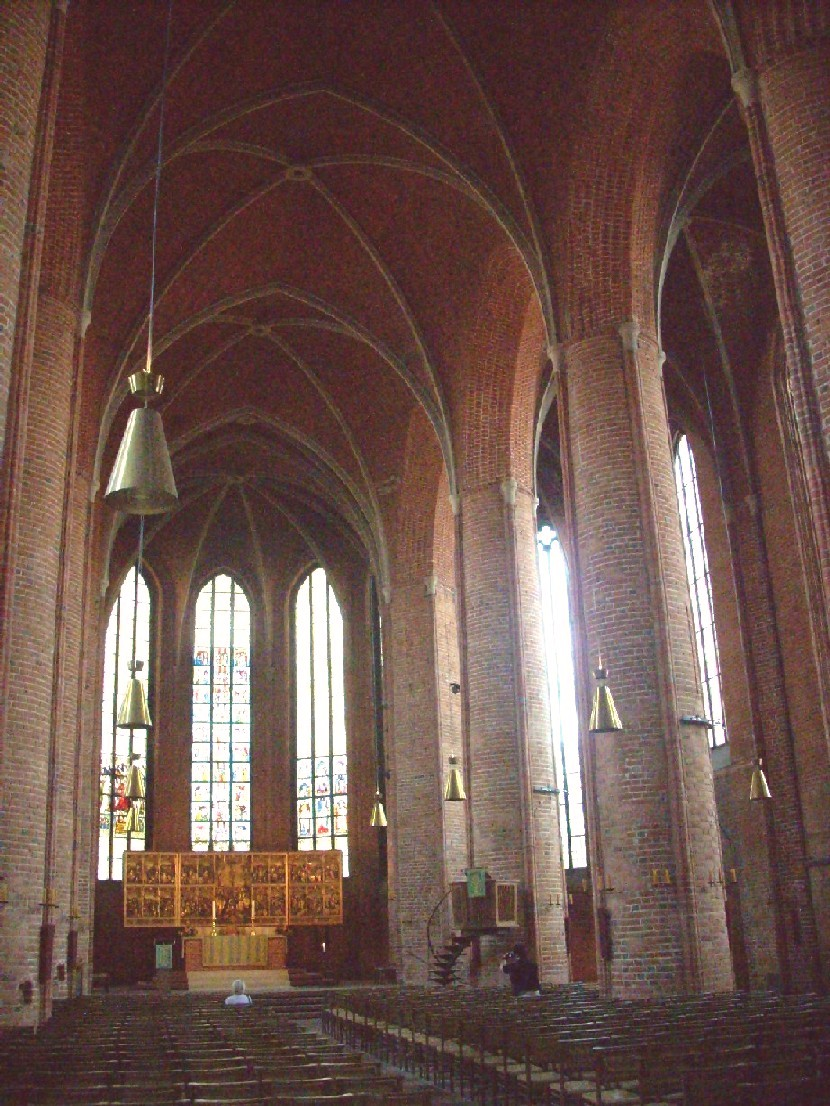
Marktkirche Hannover, 2007

Strohbach's music has been performed by notable ensembles. The ensemble amarcord performed his Galgenlieder on the poems of Christian Morgenstern in Leipzig in 1996. They included the songs in 2001 in both their concert at the festival "a cappella" in Leipzig and their first CD insalata a cappella. The Windsbacher Knabenchor recorded his Gospel motet Jesus, der Retter im Seesturm (Jesus, the saviour in the storm on the lake, 1957), which appears on a portrait of boys' choirs in an anthology Musik in Deutschland 1950–2000 of the Deutscher Musikrat. In 2006 the choir recorded his Gospel motet Jesus heilt einen Gelähmten on a CD to celebrate 60 years. His cantata for Epiphany Der Stern aus Jakob (2005), performed by the Knabenchor Hannover conducted by Jörg Breiding, appears on a collection Glaubenslieder / Neue Kantaten zum Kirchenjahr (Songs of Faith / New cantatas for the liturgical year), together with cantatas of Gordon Kampe, Alfred Koerppen and others. It is characterized: "For example, Strohbach is the only one to explicitly integrate an “aria” into his composition. His cantata for Epiphany features a large-scale baritone solo as its third movement which is accompanied by the oboe in imitation. While, in this instance, Strohbach deliberately adheres to traditional forms of composition, the narrative sections of his work are dealt with freely: He renders them through recitation as well as through a finely coloured, grand a cappella motet."

In 2010 the Mädchenchor am Kölner Dom (girls' choir at the Cologne Cathedral) celebrated their 21st anniversary with a service Kapitelsamt in the cathedral, singing his Missa Beatae Mariae Virginis. Strohbach composed a program for the annual Advent concerts of the Knabenchor Hannover in 2011 in the Marktkirche, Freuen sollen sich die Himmel (The heavens shall rejoice).
