= Eduard Künneke =

German composer

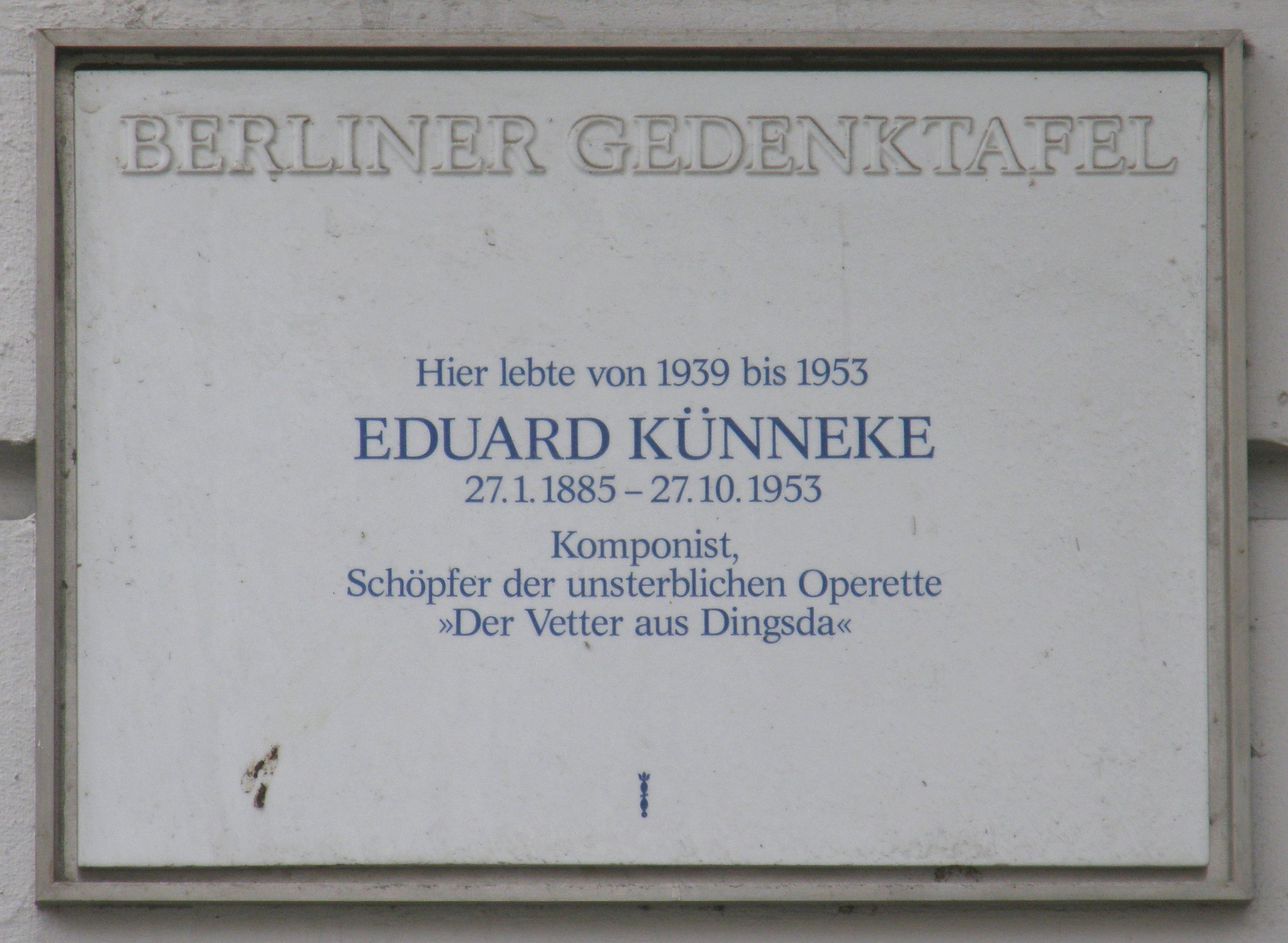
Eduard Künneke commemorative plaque.

Eduard Künneke (also seen as Edward and spelled Künnecke) (27 January 1885 – 27 October 1953 in Berlin) was a German composer notable for his operettas, operas, theatre music and some orchestral works.

Kuenneke was born in Emmerich, Lower Rhine. After obtaining his school diploma he moved in 1903 to Berlin where he studied musicology and the history of literature; he translated Beowulf into German. He was subsequently accepted into Max Bruch's master-school for musical composition attached to the Royal Academy of Arts. By 1907 Kuenneke was already a repetiteur and chorus master at a Berlin operetta theatre, the Neues Operettentheater am Schiffbauerdamm, but relinquished his post as chorus master after his opera Robins Ende (1909) was premiered in Mannheim and Coeur-As (1913) in Dresden. Thereafter he received productions at 38 German opera houses. From 1908 to 1910 he also worked as a music director for Odeon Records and conducted (without label credit) two of the earliest complete symphony recordings, the Beethoven Fifth and Sixth Symphonies with the "Grosses Odeon Streich-Orchester".

In 1911 Künneke became a conductor of the German Theatre in Berlin, where he wrote incidental music for Max Reinhardt including music for Reinhardt’s staging of Part Two of Goethe's Faust. With the coming of The Great War he became a horn player and conductor in a regimental band. In 1916 the focus of his interests began to shift to musical comedy. However, due to financial woes he took a post as serial conductor for Heinrich Berté's prettified Schubert pastiche Das Dreimaderlhaus (Blossom Time). This inspired him to write an equally maudlin singspiel Das Dorf ohne Glocke (The Village without a Bell)(1919). Subsequently he composed one operetta after another, altogether more than a dozen, and all at a high level of craftsmanship. He toured the US but, as one writer put it, "his experiences were not exactly positive". During the National Socialist years he advanced to become the "Master of German Operetta".

The trauma of the war years had its effect upon Künneke and with a heart complaint he withdrew into the solitude of his study as an "independent scholar". He died on 27 October 1953. At the funeral ceremony in Berlin he was lauded as the last great figure and noblest musician of Berlin operetta.

Künneke's graceful music is distinguished by its rhythm and striking harmonies. His best-known work is the 1921 operetta Der Vetter aus Dingsda; many of his songs are still familiar today.

In 1926, when his operetta Lady Hamilton was premiered in Breslau, he formed what became a long friendship with the conductor Franz Marszalek. Marszalek was a dedicated advocate of Künneke's music, and during his tenure at the Westdeutscher Rundfunk in Cologne (1949–65) made numerous recordings of his works (many currently unavailable) with the Cologne Radio Orchestra and the Cologne Radio Symphony Orchestra.

Künneke's daughter was the actress and singer Evelyn Künneke.

== Selected works ==
Operas

- Robins Ende, 1909
- Coeur As, 1913
- Nadja, 1931
- Die lockende Flamme
- Die grosse Sunderin, 1935
- Walther von der Vogelweide, 1945

Operettas

- Wenn Liebe erwacht, 1920
- Der Vetter aus Dingsda (The Cousin from Nowhere), 1921
- Die Ehe im Kreise, 1921
- Verliebte Leute, 1922
- Lady Hamilton, 1926
- Der Tenor der Herzogin, 1930
- Glückliche Reise, 1932, Liselott, 1932
- Die lockende Flamme, 1933
- Die große Sünderin, 1935
- Zauberin Lola, 1937
- Hochzeit in Samarkand, 1938
- Traumland, 1941
- Hochzeit mit Erika, 1949

Broadway musicals

- The Love Song, 1925
- Mayflowers, 1925

Orchestral

- Zigeunerweisen (Gypsy Airs), 1907
- Serenade for Orchestra, 1907
- Piano Concerto No. 1 in A flat major, op. 36, 1935; (Recorded on Koch Schwann CD 3-1372-2 (1997) with Tiny Wirtz, piano; Rundfunkorchester Des Sudwestfunks led by Włodzimierz Kamirski; and also with Oliver Triendl at the piano and the Munich Rundfunkorchester with Ernst Theis conducting, 2015. CPO label.)
- Tänzerische Suite, a Concerto in five movements for a jazz band and large (symphony) orchestra, 1929 (The composer conducted the Berlin Philharmonic Orchestra recording this on 14 Feb 1938. Digitally remastered for the English Dutton CD label in 2008.)

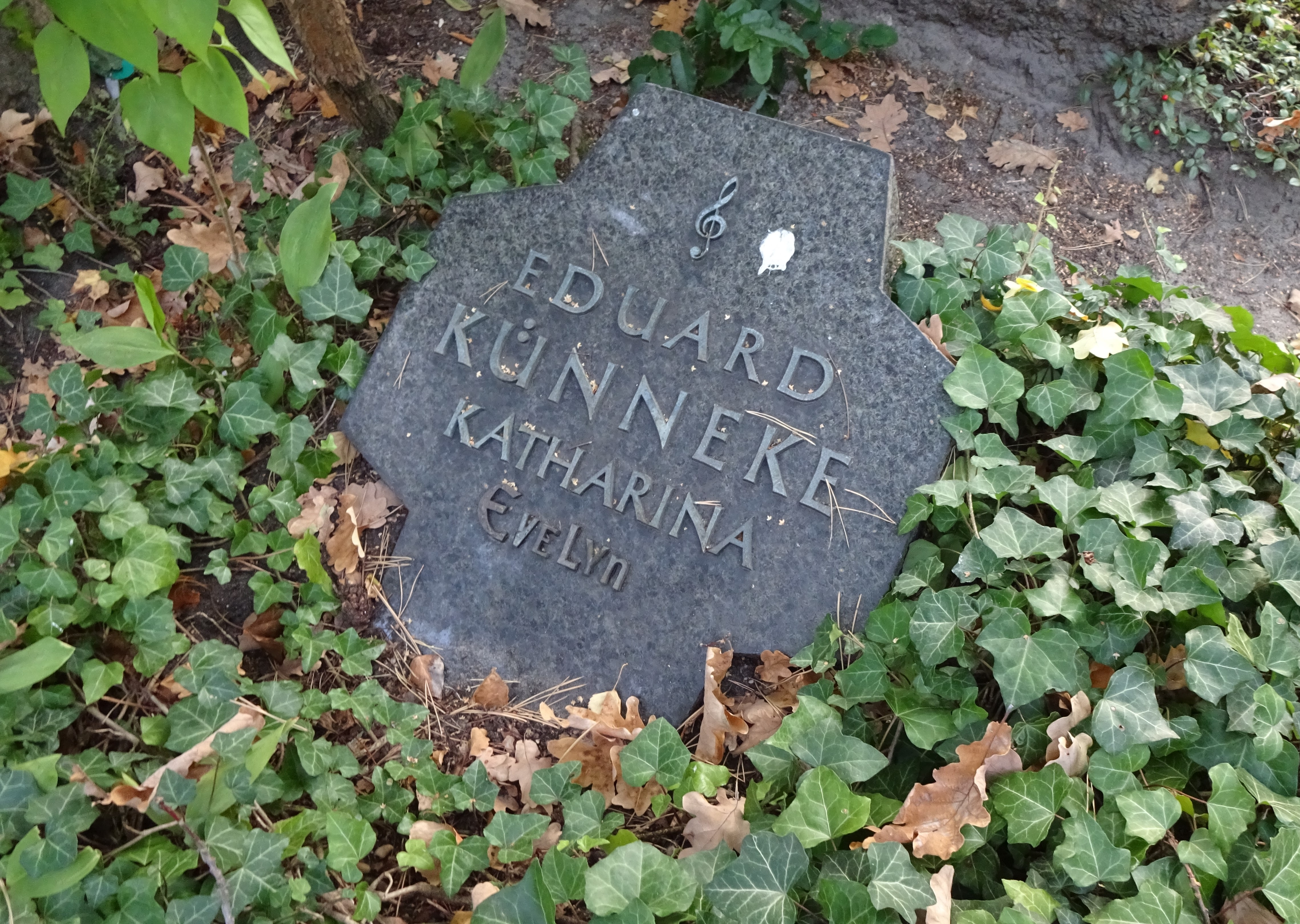
Grave with his daughter Evelyn Künneke in Friedhof Heerstraße, Berlin-Westend

Film

- Love Songs (1930)
- Madame Pompadour (1931)
- The Black Hussar (1932)
- Frederica (1932)
- The Page from the Dalmasse Hotel (1933)
- Homecoming to Happiness (1933)
- What Men Know (1933)
- Bon Voyage (1933)
- There Is Only One Love (1933)
- Young Dessau's Great Love (1933)
- Three Bluejackets and a Blonde (1933)
- The Flower Girl from the Grand Hotel (1934)
- The Voice of Love (1934)
- The Brenken Case (1934)
- The Cousin from Nowhere (1934)
- The Accusing Song (1936)
- Back in the Country (1936)
- When the Young Wine Blossoms (1943)
- Wedding with Erika (1950)
- The Cousin from Nowhere (1953)
