= The Cousin from Nowhere (1953 film) =

1953 film directed by Karl Anton

- German film poster
- German: Der Vetter aus Dingsda
- Directed by: Karl Anton
- Written by: Hal Haller; Herman Haller; Max Kempner-Hochstädt; Rideamus; F. M. Schilder; Karl Anton
- Produced by: Waldemar Frank
- Starring: Vera Molnar; Gerhard Riedmann; Grethe Weiser; Joachim Brennecke
- Cinematography: Karl Löb; Fritz Arno Wagner
- Edited by: Walter von Bonhorst
- Music by: Eduard Künneke
- Production company: Central-Europa Film
- Distributed by: Prisma
- Release date: 26 November 1953
- Running time: 102 minutes
- Country: West Germany
- Language: German

The Cousin from Nowhere (German: Der Vetter aus Dingsda) is a 1953 West German operetta film directed by Karl Anton and starring Vera Molnar, Gerhard Riedmann and Grethe Weiser. It was shot at the Wiesbaden Studios in Hesse and on location around Markgröningen, Tübingen, Bietigheim and Bad Urach. The film's sets were designed by the art directors Erich Kettelhut and Max Vorwerg. It is based on the 1921 operetta The Cousin from Nowhere composed by Eduard Künneke.

== Cast ==
- Vera Molnar as Julia de Weert
- Gerhard Riedmann as Hans, ein Wanderbursche
- Grethe Weiser as Tante Wimpel
- Joachim Brennecke as Roderich de Weert
- Irene von Meyendorff as Irmgard von Ottenberg
- Ina Halley as Hannchen
- Hans Richter as August Kuhbrot
- Gunther Philipp as Dr. jur. Egon Krumm
- Paul Westermeier as Josef Kuhbrot
- Kurt Pratsch-Kaufmann as Otto Bauke
- Franz-Otto Krüger as Onkel Gustav
- Olga Limburg as Großtante Rosa
- Edith Schollwer as Hanne van Zeevenhook
- Herta Worell as Witwe Knobel
- Wolfgang Jansen
- Maria Consuelo
- Ingrid Fernholt
- Fritz Vogtherr
- Herbert Geyer
- Inge Siebert
- Panos Papadopulos
- Sabine Anton
- Gisela Anton
- Alessandro Conti as singer
- Lieselotte Cloos as singer
- Delia Doris as singer
