= The Cousin from Nowhere (operetta) =

Operetta by Eduard Künneke

The Cousin from Nowhere (German: Der Vetter aus Dingsda) is an operetta composed by Eduard Künneke with a libretto by Herman Haller and Fritz Oliven, based on a comedy by Max Kempner-Hochstädt. It was first performed on 15 April 1921 in the Neues Schauspielhaus, Berlin.

An English language version, billed as a "musical comedy", was adapted by Fred Thompson with lyrics by Adrian Ross, Robert C. Tharp and Douglas Furber, and was first performed in 1922 in the United Kingdom. A separate English language adaptation, with book and lyrics by Harry B. Smith, was performed in 1923 at the Ambassador Theatre on Broadway under the title Caroline. The song "I'm Only a Strolling Vagabond", from the operetta, became the signature song of English performer Cavan O'Connor, who first recorded it in 1925.

The work was adapted into films in 1934 and in 1953.
