= WDR Funkhausorchester =

German radio orchestra

- Radio orchestra
- Native name: WDR Funkhausorchester
- Former name: Kölner Rundfunkorchester
- Founded: 1947; 78 years ago
- Location: Cologne, Germany
- Concert hall: Kölner Philharmonie; Funkhaus Wallrafplatz
- Principal conductor: Frank Strobel
- Website: Official website

The WDR Funkhausorchester is a German broadcast orchestra of the Westdeutscher Rundfunk (WDR, West German Broadcasting) in Cologne. The orchestra gives its concerts in such venues as the Kölner Philharmonie and in the Funkhaus Wallrafplatz.

== History ==
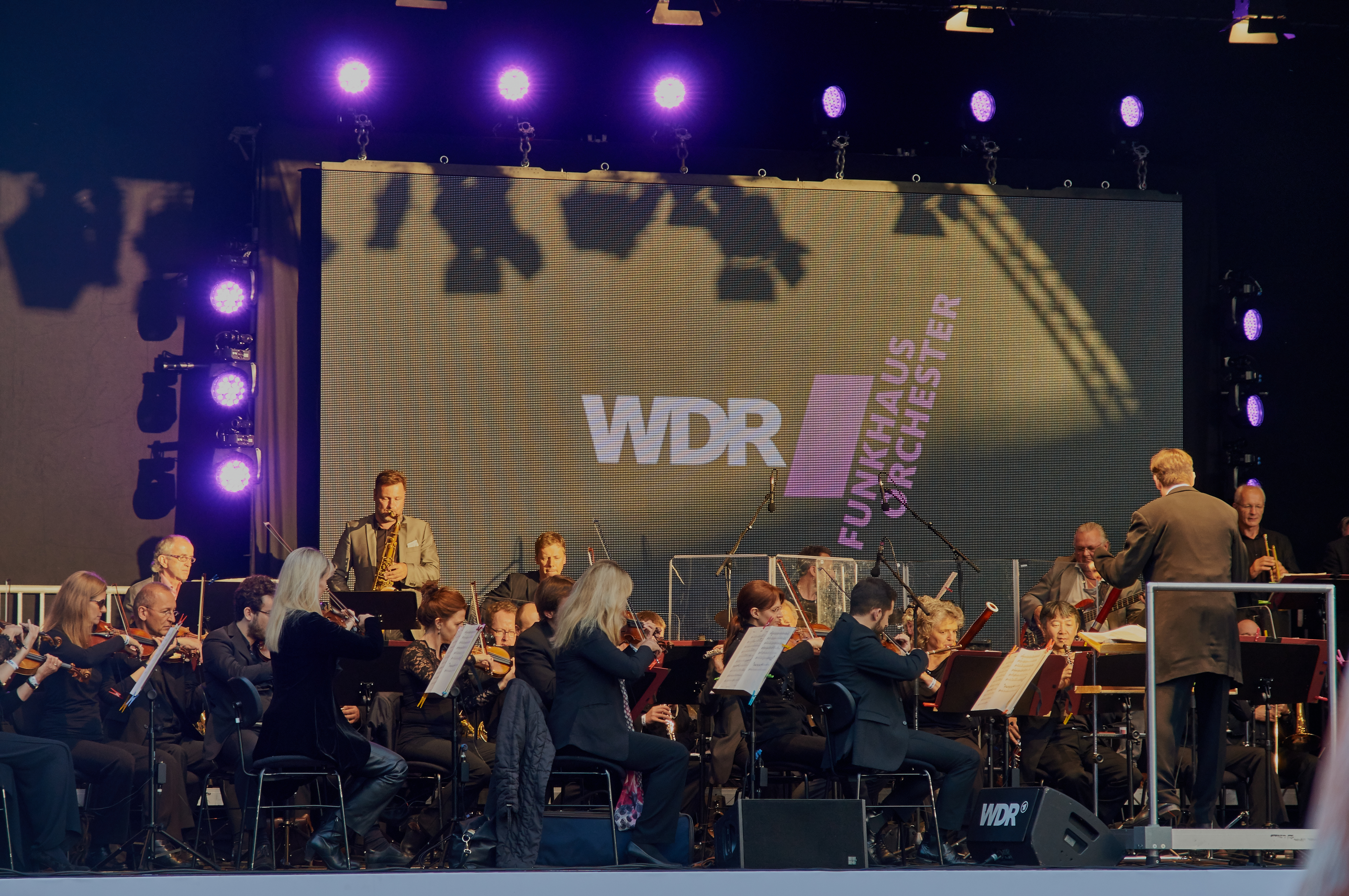
WDR Funkhausorchester at Aasee (Münster)

Groups from which the orchestra was formed date back to 1927. In its present form, the orchestra was founded in 1947, with Hermann Hagestedt as its first chief conductor. The orchestra has been known previously as the Kölner Rundfunkorchester.

The orchestra's repertoire includes a full range of popular music, musicals, opera and operetta, film and classical music, including lesser-known oratorio and "easy listening" music. For several years, the orchestra has worked with younger conductors such as Titus Engel and Rasmus Baumann.

The orchestra's most recent chief conductor was Wayne Marshall, who held the post from 2014 through 2020. The orchestra's current principal guest conductor is Enrico Delamboye. In November 2020, the orchestra announced the appointment of Frank Strobel as its next chief conductor, effective in the autumn of 2021.

== Chief conductors ==
- Hermann Hagestedt (1947–1968)
- Franz Marszalek (1949–1965)
- Curt Cremer (1968–1989)
- Heinz Geese (1968–1995)
- Helmuth Froschauer (1997–2006)
- Michail Jurowski (2006–2008)
- Niklas Willén (2010–2013)
- Wayne Marshall (2014–2020)
- Frank Strobel (2021–present)

== See also ==
- Studio for Electronic Music (WDR)
- WDR Symphony Orchestra Cologne (WDR Sinfonieorchester Köln)
- WDR Big Band
- WDR Rundfunkchor Köln
- Radio orchestra
