= Helmuth Froschauer =

Austrian conductor (1933–2019)

- Born: Helmuth Emil Froschauer; 22 September 1933; Vienna, Austria
- Died: 18 August 2019 (aged 85); Vienna, Austria
- Education: Wiener Sängerknaben
- Occupations: Conductor; Choral conductor
- Organizations: Wiener Sängerknaben; Wiener Singverein; Vienna State Opera; WDR Rundfunkchor Köln; WDR Rundfunkorchester Köln

Helmuth Emil Froschauer (22 September 1933 – 18 August 2019) was an Austrian conductor, especially a choral conductor who received his first training as a member of the Wiener Sängerknaben. He conducted the choir from 1953 to 1965, including 22 international tours. He went on to conduct the choirs of the Wiener Singverein, the Vienna State Opera and the WDR Rundfunkchor Köln. As a close collaborator of Herbert von Karajan from 1989, he prepared choirs for the Salzburg Festival among others.

== Life and career ==
Born in Vienna, Froschauer received his musical education with the Wiener Sängerknaben boys' choir. He studied piano, horn, composition and conducting at the Wiener Musikakademie.

From 1953 to 1965 he conducted one of the choirs of the Wiener Sängerknaben. As Kapellmeister he led this ensemble on 22 international tours. He conducted the choir in recordings and the film Almost Angels. At the beginning of the 1960s, as musical director of the Walt Disney Productions in Vienna, he also directed several music films with the Vienna Symphony Orchestra. From 1968 to 1991 Froschauer was, at times simultaneously, solo répétiteur and choir director at the Vienna State Opera as well as choir director of the Wiener Singverein and the Bregenzer Festspiele.

As a close collaborator of Herbert von Karajan from 1989, he was involved in the preparation of numerous concerts, recordings, and television recordings at Salzburg Festival, Berliner Festwochen, and Wiener Festwochen.

Froschauer worked for the Westdeutscher Rundfunk Köln from 1992, first as choir director of the WDR Rundfunkchor Köln, then from 1997/99 to 2003 also as chief conductor of the WDR Rundfunkorchester Köln, of which he later became honorary conductor.

For many years, Froschauer and two other colleagues have also conducted the Sunday masses in the Vienna Hofburgkapelle, in which the Wiener Sängerknaben also took part. Froschauer died in Vienna at age 85.

His son is the violinist Daniel Froschauer, chairman of the Vienna Philharmonic.

Cultural offices
Preceded by Heinz Geese	Chief Conductor, Kölner Rundfunkorchester; 1997–2006	Succeeded by Michail Jurowski
