= Franz Marszalek =

German conductor and composer

Franz Marszalek (born 2 August 1900 in Breslau, Schlesien, Germany (now Wrocław, Silesia, Poland); died 28 October 1975 in Cologne, Germany) was a German conductor and composer, who was a leading figure in operetta. He began his studies in Breslau, and moved to Berlin in 1933. He conducted the Cologne Radio Orchestra from 1949 to 1965, with an emphasis on operetta music. He was a longtime friend of the operetta composer Eduard Künneke, whose music he championed in concerts and in recordings with the Cologne Radio Orchestra and the Cologne Radio Symphony Orchestra.

A 100 CD box with 50+ operettas "Zauber Der Operette - Operetta Collector's Box" under his conduction has been published in 2011. These are 1950s studio recordings with the Cologne Radio Orchestra, covering the 1870s to 1930s period. Mono recordings from the archive tapes including stars like Rothenberger, Jurinac, Streich and Schock.

Cultural offices
Preceded by Hermann Hagestedt	Chief Conductor, Kölner Rundfunkorchester; 1949–1965	Succeeded by Curt Cremer; Heinz Geese
