= Max Kempner-Hochstädt =

German writer (1863–1934)

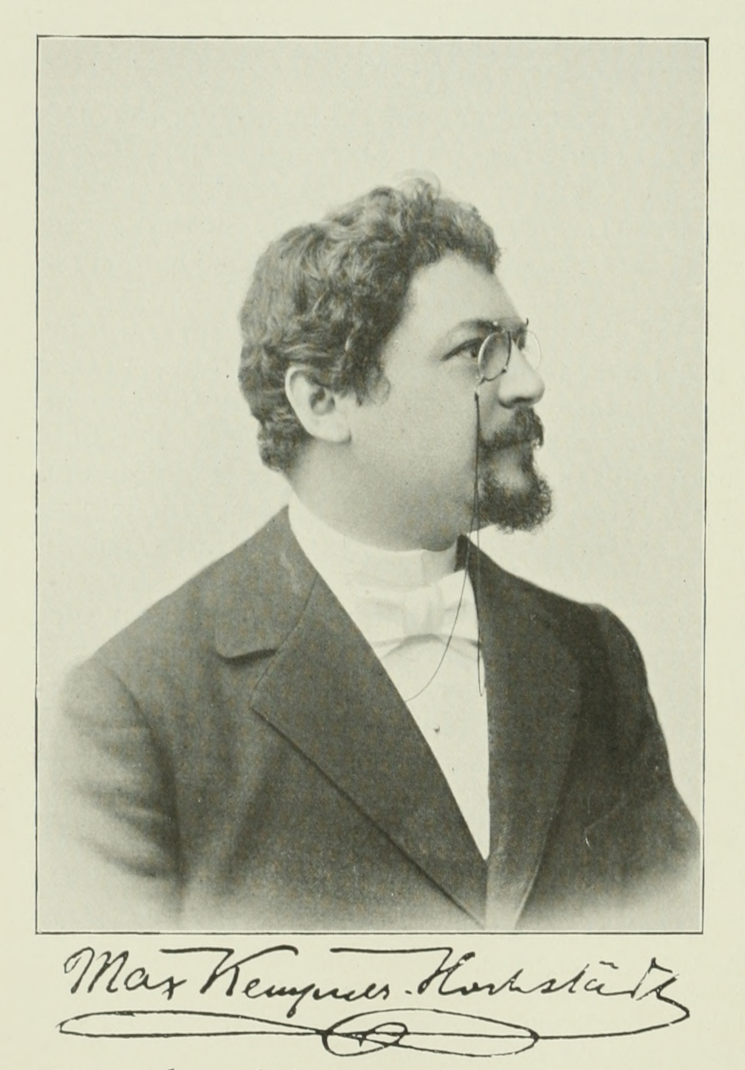
- Born: Max Kempner; 5 March 1863; Breslau, Silesia, Prussia
- Died: 22 January 1934 (aged 70); Genoa, Kingdom of Italy
- Spouse: Martha Dräger (m. 1890)
- Writing career
- Pen name: Eckart; Erik Hostrup
- Language: German

Max Kempner-Hochstädt (5 March 1863 – 22 January 1934) was German writer, dramatist, and poet. Over the course of his career he wrote some 20 plays, many of which were performed in Germany and abroad.

== Biography ==
Max Kempner was born to Jewish parents Ulrike (née Zadig) and Joseph Kempner in Breslau in 1863. His father was the inventor of milk glass manufactured without cryolite. He attended the gymnasium in Zittau, then studied philosophy, literature, art history, and economics at the universities of Berlin and Breslau. He obtained a doctorate in 1885.

Kempner reportedly wrote his first poem at age 7. He began his literary career at the age of 25 with the poetry collection Buch der Liebe (1888), which was frequently reprinted. His subsequent work included a wide variety of plays, several of which were performed in major theatres across Germany. His short stories—published both in various periodicals and in collected volumes—were well-regarded for their nuanced characterization, especially of women. For many years, he served as editor of the magazines Mode und Haus and Große Modenwelt.

Notable stage works include the tragedy Warbeck (1891), the dramas Medea (1895) and Die Jahreszeiten (1898), and the comedies Byzantiner, Der Eheteufel, and Die Schachspieler. He wrote farces such as Harakiri (1895), Amors Geheimnis, Familie Pointu, and Der Herr von Pilsnitz (1898), the latter of which was also staged in the United States. He also wrote the Volksstück Das neue Programm and several operetta librettos, including König Rhampsinit (1894).

He was married to Martha Kempner-Hochstädt (née Dräger), who performed as a reciter and published children's stories under the pseudonym Lalla Rukh.
