= Jules Gressier =

French conductor

Jules Gressier (24 June 1897, in Roubaix (Nord-Pas-de-Calais) – 27 June 1960, in Aix-les-Bains (Rhône-Alpes) was a French conductor, particularly associated with lyric repertoire and with operetta.

== Life and career ==
In early 1926 Gressier conducted Le Barbier de Séville, Véronique and Miss Heylett in Toulouse with the orchestra of the Variétés and soloists Mathieu-Lutz, Foix and René Gerbert.

He conducted the local premieres of Chanson d'amour and Ciboulette in Toulouse in 1926-27, both with Andrée Verly in the title role.

Gressier was a member of the conducting staff at Nice Opera in the 1934 season.

He conducted the première of the three-act opérette Malvina by Hahn in March 1935, which he also conducted at the Opéra-Comique in 1950, Vieux Garçons ! by Louis Urgel in February 1931, and Un p'tit bout d'femme by René Mercier in 1936, all at the Théâtre de la Gaîté Lyrique in Paris, with which he was associated in the 1930s.

Gressier conducted most of a festival concert in honour of Gustave Charpentier in September 1937 at the Théâtre des Champs-Élysées in Paris with excerpts from Le Couronnement de la Muse du Peuple and selections from Louise (act 3 of which was conducted by the composer).

A member of the music staff of French radio evacuated to Rennes already in September 1940, Gressier was the chief conductor of the 60-strong Orchestre lyrique de la Radiodiffusion nationale (French radio) from 1941 to 1951. He was made head of lyrical broadcasting in 1943 with the musical programming of French radio, which he continued until his death. Gressier himself conducted many opera and operetta broadcasts.

Gressier made his debut at the Paris Opéra-Comique in 1948 with Mignon, and conducted Rigoletto at the Opéra in September 1950.

He was noted for his sensitive and enlightened direction of operetta, especially Offenbach. A comparison of a modern recording of Les P’tites Michu by Max Loppert commented that the 1954 French EMI recording of highlights was "conducted with inimitable flair and delicacy by Jules Gressier", and of a 1992 two-CD compilation of three works by the composer with Gressier "the whole of which adds up to a masterclass in Messager style".

== Recordings ==
Complete, or extended excerpts from operas were recorded by Gressier as follows, with record company labels and year given where available:

- Cendrillon (Jules Massenet) rec 25 December 1943 (with Simone Blain (Cendrillon), Jean Guilhem (Le Prince Charmant), Mireille Berthon (Mme de la Haltière), Lucien Lovano (Pandolfe), Paule Touzet (la Fée))
- Thaïs (Jules Massenet) 1944
- Faust (Charles Gounod) 1947
- Otello (Giuseppe Verdi) 1948
- Le Domino noir (Daniel François Esprit Auber) 1950
- La Fille de Madame Angot (Charles Lecocq) 1951, Pathé
- Monsieur Beaucaire (André Messager) 1951, Pathé
- La Belle Hélène (Jacques Offenbach) 1951, Pathé
- Les Cloches de Corneville (Robert Planquette) 1951, Pathé
- Phi-Phi (Henri Christiné) 1952, Pathé
- Véronique (André Messager) 1952, Pathé
- Le Petit duc (Charles Lecocq) 1953, Pathé (with Liliane Berton (La Duchesse de Parthenay), Nadine Renaux (Le Duc de Parthenay), Willy Clément (Montlandry), René Hérent (Frimousse))
- Les Saltimbanques (Louis Ganne) 1953, Pathé (with Liliane Berton (Suzanne), Freda Betti (Marion), and Claude Devos (Paillasse))
- La Veuve Joyeuse (Franz Lehár) 1953, Pathé
- Orphée aux Enfers (Jacques Offenbach) 1953, Pathé
- Les P'tites Michu (André Messager) 1954, Pathé
- Le Tzarewitch (Johann Strauss) 1954
- Le Barbier de Séville (Gioacchino Rossini) 1954-55, Pathé (with Liliane Berton, Freda Betti, Jean Giraudeau, Michel Dens, Lucien Lovano, Xavier Depraz)
- Lakmé (Léo Delibes) 1955, Rodolphe
- Moineau (Louis Beydts) 1955
- Au soleil de Mexique (Maurice Yvain) 1955
- Hans le joueur de flûte (Louis Ganne) 1955, Gaieté Lyrique
- Madame Chrysanthème (André Messager) 1956
- Walzer aus Wien (Johann Strauss II) 1957, Pathé
- La Mascotte (Edmond Audran) 1958, Pathé (with Michel Dens (Pippo), Duvaleix (Laurent XVII), Claude Devos (Fritellini))
- Monsieur Beaucaire (André Messager) 1958, Gaieté Lyrique (with Martha Angelici, Michel Dens)
- Rip (Robert Planquette) 1958, Pathé (with Michel Dens (Rip), Claude Devos (Jack), Jean-Christophe Benoît (Ichabod) and Liliane Berton (Nelly))
- Les mousquetaires au couvent (Louis Varney) Pathé-Marconi, 1958 (with Michel Dens (Narcisse de Brissac), Duvaleix (abbé Bridaine), Raymond Amade (Solanges))
- Mireille (Charles Gounod), 1959, Chant du Monde
- Isoline : ballet (André Messager)
