= L'Enfance du Christ =

19th century oratorio by Hector Berlioz

- Oratorio by Hector Berlioz
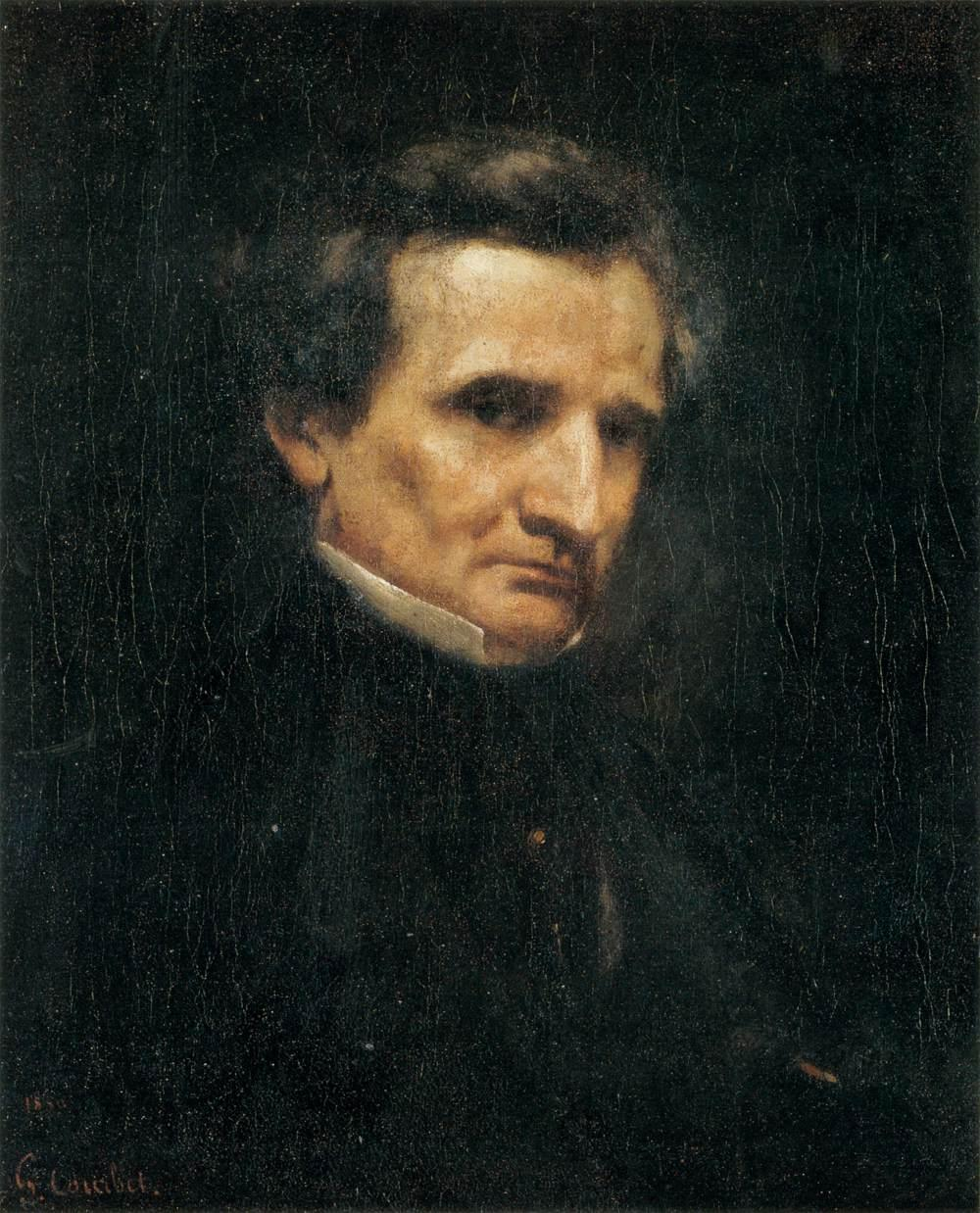
- Berlioz portrayed in 1850
- English: The Childhood of Christ
- Opus: 25
- Text: by Berlioz based on Matthew 2:13
- Language: French
- Based on: La fuite en Egypte (1850)
- Performed: 10 December 1854
- Movements: 25, in three parts
- Scoring: 7 soloists; chorus; orchestra; organ

L'Enfance du Christ (The Childhood of Christ), Opus 25, is an oratorio by the French composer Hector Berlioz, based on the Holy Family's flight into Egypt (see Gospel of Matthew 2:13). Berlioz wrote his own words for the piece. Most of it was composed in 1853 and 1854, but it also incorporates an earlier work La fuite en Egypte (1850). It was first performed at the Salle Herz in Paris on 10 December 1854, with Berlioz conducting and soloists from the Opéra-Comique: Jourdan (Récitant), Depassio (Hérode), the couple Meillet (Marie and Joseph) and Bataille (Le Père de famille).

Berlioz described L'Enfance as a Trilogie sacrée (sacred trilogy). The first of its three sections depicts King Herod ordering the massacre of all newborn children in Judaea; the second shows the Holy Family of Mary, Joseph, and Jesus setting out for Egypt to avoid the slaughter, having been warned by angels; and the final section portrays their arrival in the Egyptian town of Sais where they are given refuge by a family of Ishmaelites. Berlioz was not religious as an adult but remained all his life susceptible to the beauty of the religious music that had enraptured him as a child. L'Enfance also shows some influence from the Biblical oratorios of Berlioz's teacher Jean-François Le Sueur.

== Background ==
The idea for L'enfance went back to 1850 when Berlioz composed an organ piece for his friend Joseph-Louis Duc, called L'adieu des bergers (The Shepherds' Farewell). He soon turned it into a choral movement for the shepherds saying goodbye to the baby Jesus as he leaves Bethlehem for Egypt. Berlioz had the chorus performed as a hoax on 12 November 1850, passing it off as the work of an imaginary 17th-century composer "Ducré". He was gratified to discover many people who hated his music were taken in and praised it, one lady even going so far as to say, "Berlioz would never be able to write a tune as simple and charming as this little piece by old Ducré".

He then added a piece for tenor, Le repos de la sainte famille (The Repose of the Holy Family) and preceded both movements with an overture to form a work he called La fuite en Egypte. It was published in 1852 and first performed in Leipzig in December, 1853. The premiere was so successful, Berlioz's friends urged him to expand the piece and he added a new section, L'arrivée à Sais (The Arrival at Sais), which included parts for Mary and Joseph. Berlioz, perhaps feeling the result was still unbalanced, then composed a third section to precede the other two, Le songe d'Hérode (Herod's Dream).

== Reception ==
Berlioz's music was usually received with great hostility by Parisian audiences and critics, who generally accused it of being bizarre and discordant. Yet L'Enfance du Christ was an immediate success and was praised by all but two critics in the Paris newspapers. Some attributed its favourable reception to a new, gentler style, a claim Berlioz vigorously rejected:

In that work many people imagined they could detect a radical change in my style and manner. This opinion is entirely without foundation. The subject naturally lent itself to a gentle and simple style of music, and for that reason alone was more in accordance with their taste and intelligence. Time would probably have developed these qualities, but I should have written L'Enfance du Christ in the same manner twenty years ago.

The work has maintained its popularity – it is often performed around Christmas – and many recordings have been made of it.

== Roles ==
- Le récitant (the narrator) (tenor)
- La vierge Marie (the Virgin Mary) (soprano or mezzo-soprano)
- Joseph (baritone)
- Hérode (Herod) (bass)
- Le père de famille (father of the family) (bass)
- Centurion (a Roman centurion) (tenor)
- Polydorus (bass)

== Structure ==
- Part One: Le Songe d'Hérode (Herod's Dream)
1. Scene 1: Narrator: "Dans la crèche" ("In the cradle..."). The work starts abruptly without an overture or prelude with the tenor narrator describing the situation in the land at the time of Christ's birth.
2. Marche nocturne (Nocturnal March). A fugal passage of interweaving melodies evoking Roman soldiers patrolling outside King Herod's palace by night.
3. Polydorus: "Qui vient" ("Who is coming..?")
4. Marche nocturne (continued)
5. Scene 2: Herod's aria. One of the most famous pieces in L'Enfance, this long aria expresses the king's inner despair as he is tormented by a recurring dream of a child who will overthrow him. Herod is accompanied by trombones just as Méphistophélès was in The Damnation of Faust.
6. Scene 3: Polydorus: "Seigneur" ("My lord"). Polydorus announces the arrival of the Jewish soothsayers.
7. Scene 4: Herod and the soothsayers. Herod describes his dream to the soothsayers.
8. The soothsayers make Cabbalistic processions and proceed to the exorcism. A short, wild dance in 7/4 time.
9. Soothsayers: "La voix dit vrai" ("The voice speaks the truth"). The soothsayers confirm that Herod's dream is true and advise him to kill every newborn child in the land.
10. Herod: "Eh bien" ("Very well") Herod agrees and gives orders for the Massacre of the Innocents.
11. Scene 5: The stable in Bethlehem. Christ is in the manger as Mary and Joseph sing a lullaby to him.
12. Scene 6: Choir of angels: "Joseph! Marie!". The angels warn them to flee to Egypt to escape Herod's persecution. Berlioz uses an off-stage choir (accompanied by an organ) in an open room to represent the angels, an effect originally used in François-Joseph Gossec's La nativité (1774). During the final bars, he then suggests the doors to be closed.
- Part Two: La fuite en Égypte (The Flight to Egypt)
1. Overture. Another fugue in triple time.
2. L'adieu des bergers (The shepherds' farewell). A famous choral movement, often performed separately.
3. Le repos de la Sainte Famille (The repose of the Holy Family). This movement is sung by the Narrator and briefly at the end the Female Chorus enters. It depicts Mary, Joseph and Jesus resting in the shade of a tree.
- Part Three: L'arrivée à Saïs (The Arrival at Sais)
1. Narrator: "Depuis trois jours" ("For three days...") The narrator describes the troubled journey from Bethlehem to Sais in Egypt.
2. Scene 1: Inside the town of Sais. Joseph and Mary's pleas for refuge are rejected by the people of Sais because they are Hebrews. The musical accompaniment is suitably anguished.
3. Scene 2: Inside the Ishmaelites' house. Finally the father of a family of Ishmaelites (in other words, unbelievers) takes pity on them and invites them into his house.
4. Father of the family: "Grand Dieu!" ("Almighty God!"). The Ishmaelite orders his family to care for the travellers.
5. Father of the family: "Sur vos traits fatigués" ("On your tired features"). Learning that Joseph is a carpenter too, he invites him to join him at his work. Joseph and his family may stay in the house for as long as necessary.
6. Father of the family: Pour bien finir cette soirée ("To end this evening"). He has music played to soothe them.
7. Trio for two flutes and a harp. An instrumental interlude, one of the few pieces of chamber music Berlioz ever wrote. The use of the flutes and harps is inspired by Gounod's opera Sapho and is meant to evoke the atmosphere of the ancient world.
8. Father of the family: "Vous pleurez, jeune mère ("You are weeping, young mother"). The Ishmaelite urges Mary to go to sleep and worry no longer.
9. Scene 3: Epilogue. The narrator describes how Jesus spent ten years growing up in Egypt.
10. Narrator and chorus: "O mon âme" ("O my soul"). The work concludes with this serene movement for tenor and choir.

== Recordings ==
- L'Enfance du Christ Christiane Gayraud, Michel Sénéchal, Michel Roux, André Vessières, Xavier Depraz Choeurs de la Radiodiffusion-Télévision Française, Orchestre des concerts Colonne, conducted by Pierre Dervaux (Disques Vega) 1960
- L'Enfance du Christ Hélène Bouvier, Jean Giraudeau, Michel Roux, Louis Noguéra, Choeurs Raymond Saint-Paul, Orchestre de la Société des Concerts du Conservatoire, conducted by André Cluytens (EMI classics) 1966
- L'Enfance du Christ Florence Kopleff, Cesare Valletti, Giorgio Tozzi, Gérard Souzay, New England Conservatory Chorus, Boston Symphony Orchestra, conducted by Charles Münch (RCA Victor) 1966
- L'Enfance du Christ Victoria de los Ángeles, Nicolai Gedda, Roger Soyer, Ernest Blanc, René Duclos Choir, Orchestre de la Société des Concerts du Conservatoire, conducted by André Cluytens (EMI) 1966
- L'Enfance du Christ Janet Baker, Eric Tappy, Philip Langridge, Thomas Allen, John Alldis Choir, London Symphony Orchestra, conducted by Sir Colin Davis (Philips) 1976
- L'Enfance du Christ Anne Sofie von Otter, Anthony Rolfe Johnson, José van Dam, Monteverdi Choir, Lyons Opera Orchestra, conducted by John Eliot Gardiner (Erato) 1990
- L'Enfance du Christ Ann Murray, Robert Tear, David Wilson-Johnson, Thomas Allen, Choir of King's College, Cambridge, Royal Philharmonic Orchestra, conducted by Stephen Cleobury (EMI) 1990
- L'Enfance du Christ Jean Rigby, John Aler, Alastair Miles, Gerald Finley, Corydon Singers, Corydon Orchestra, conducted by Matthew Best (Hyperion) 1994
- L'Enfance du Christ Susan Graham, John Mark Ainsley, François Le Roux, Andrew Wentzel, Orchestre Symphonique de Montreal, conducted by Charles Dutoit (Decca) 1995
- L'Enfance du Christ Véronique Gens, Paul Agnew, Olivier Lallouette, Laurent Naouri, La Chapelle Royale, Collegium Vocale Gent, Orchestre des Champs-Élysées, conducted by Philippe Herreweghe (Harmonia Mundi) 1997
- L'Enfance du Christ Christiane Oelze, Mark Padmore, Ralf Lukas, Christopher Maltman, SWR Vokalensemble, Radio-Sinfonieorchester Stuttgart des SWR, conducted by Sir Roger Norrington (Hänssler) 2003
- L'Enfance du Christ Jane Henschel, Yann Beuron, Phillipe Rouillon, Gabor Breta, Eric Martin-Bonnet, EuropaChorAkademie, Orchestre Philharmonique du Luxembourg, conducted by Sylvain Cambreling (Glor Classics) 2009
- L'Enfance du Christ Veronique Gens, Stephan Loges, Alastair Miles, Yann Beuron, Swedish Radio Symphony Choir, Swedish Radio Symphony Orchestra, conducted by Robin Ticciati (Linn Records) 2013
- L'Enfance du Christ Sasha Cooke, Andrew Staples, Matthew Brook, Roderick Williams, Melbourne Symphony Orchestra, conducted by Sir Andrew Davis (Chandos) 2019

== TV adaptations ==
- L'Enfance du Christ Helen Vanni, Charles Anthony, Giorgio Tozzi, Sherrill Milnes, Ara Berberian, Camerata Singers, CBS Orchestra, conducted by Alfredo Antonini for CBS television (1964).

== Sources ==
- David Cairns: Berlioz: The Making of an Artist (the first volume of his biography of the composer) (André Deutsch, 1989)
- David Cairns: Berlioz: Servitude and Greatness (the second volume of his biography of the composer) (Viking, 1999)
- Hugh Macdonald: Berlioz ("The Master Musicians", J.M.Dent, 1982)
- Berlioz: Memoirs (Dover, 1960)
