= Martha Angelici =

French opera singer (1907–1973)

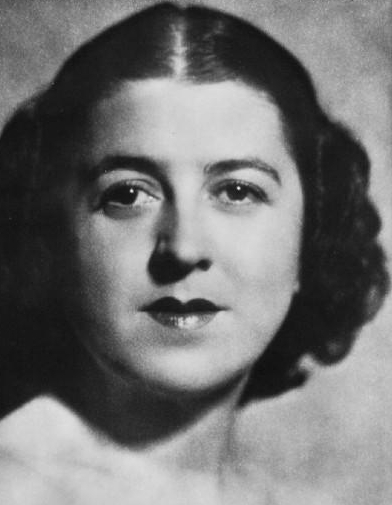
- Angelici in 1945
- Born: Martha Angelici; 22 May 1907; Cargèse, Corsica, France
- Died: 11 September 1973 (aged 66); Ajaccio, Corsica, France
- Occupation: Opera singer
- Years active: 1933–?
- Spouse: François Agostini

Martha Angelici (22 May 1907 – 11 September 1973) was a French operatic soprano of Corsican origin, particularly associated with the French lyric repertoire.

Angelici was born in Cargèse. While still very young she moved with her family to Belgium, where she studied voice in Brussels with Alfred Mahy. She began singing on radio for the Belgian, Dutch and Luxembourgian audiences in 1933, and gave her first public concert at the Kurzaal of Ostend in 1934. Her first stage performance was in Marseille, as Mimi in La bohème, in 1936.

She made her debut at the Opéra-Comique in 1938, where she had a long and successful career, and made her debut at the Palais Garnier in 1953, as Micaela in Carmen, other notable roles included Leila, Pamina, Nedda, etc. She made a few guest appearances at the Monte Carlo Opera and La Monnaie in Brussels. She was much admired in French baroque music notably in Rameau's Les Indes galantes.

== Personal life and death ==
She was married to the director of the Opéra-Comique, François Agostini. She died in Ajaccio, aged 66.

== Selected recordings ==
- 1950 – Bizet – Carmen – Solange Michel, Raoul Jobin, Martha Angelici, Michel Dens – Choeurs et Orchestre de l'Opéra-Comique, André Cluytens – EMI Classics
- 1953 – Charpentier – Messe A Six Voix Et Symphonie Assumpta Est Maria – Martha Angelici, soprano; Solange Michel, mezzo-soprano; Jeannine Collad, alto; Jean Archimbaud, conter-tenor; Jean Giraudeau, tenor; Louis Noguéra, bass – Henriette Roget, organ – Chorus of the Jeunesses musicales de France, Louis Martini, director. Recorded in Paris St-Eustache Church, 28–29 April 1953. Pathé DTX 140, Vox PLP-8440, Club National du Disque CND 546.
- 1955 – Bizet – Les pêcheurs de perles – Martha Angelici, Henri Legay, Michel Dens, Louis Noguéra – Choeurs et Orchestre de l'Opéra-Comique, André Cluytens – EMI Classics

== Sources ==
- Operissimo.com
- Klaus Ulrich Spiegel: "La voix de Corse. Lucidité, Douceur, Style: Martha Angelici" - HAfG Edition Hamburger Archiv
