= Nadine Renaux =

French soprano

Nadine Renaux (13 July 1912, Villeurbanne – 22 January 2005) was a French soprano, active in opera and operetta in France from the 1930s to the 1960s.

== Life and career ==
Born Jeanne Chatagner (married name Perbal) she made her debut at the Paris Opéra-Comique on 18 July 1943 in the title role of Madame Butterfly.

She appeared in the title role of Angélique, as Rosine in Le Barbier de Séville, Micaëla in Carmen, Delphine in Così fan tutte (which she also sang in Nice), Olympia in Les contes d'Hoffmann, Princesse Laoula in L'Étoile, Jacqueline in Fortunio, Concepción in L'heure espagnole, Javotte and the title role in Manon, Philine in Mignon, the title role in Mireille, Suzanne in Les Noces de Figaro, Léïla in Les Pêcheurs de perles, Nicette in Le pré aux clercs, Nedda in Pagliacci, the title role in La Traviata, Mimi in La Bohème, la Périchole in Le Carrosse du Saint-Sacrement and the title role in Ciboulette. She also took part in the premieres at the Salle Favart of Blaise le savetier, La Farce de Maître Pathelin and Marion.

She sang Zerbinetta in a revival of Roland Manuel's Isabelle et Pantalon in 1959 alongside Liliane Berton conducted by Georges Prêtre.

At the Opéra, Renaux sang Papagena in 1949, Blondine in 1951 and Zerlina in 1957.

She sang in a rare revival of La Basoche in Monte Carlo in 1954, the cast also including Denise Duval, Pierre Mollet and Louis Noguéra, conducted by Albert Wolff.

For the B.B.C. Third Programme she sang Laurette in a studio performance of Le Docteur Miracle, alongside Willy Clément, Marjorie Westbury and Alexander Young, conducted by Stanford Robinson.

== Recordings ==
Nadine Renaux participated in recordings of an abridged version of La Mascotte by Audran (singing Bettina), the Bach Magnificat under Jean Gitton, the Duc de Parthenay in Le Petit duc by Charles Lecocq, Agathe in Messager's Véronique under Gressier, Gabrielle in La Vie parisienne by Offenbach under Gressier and Simone in Les Mousquetaires au couvent by Louis Varney under Marcel Cariven, all for Pathé in the 1950s.
