= Louis Noguéra =

French opera singer

Louis Noguéra was a French bass-baritone (born in Algiers on 12 October 1910, died in Paris on 8 March 1984) who enjoyed a long career in Paris—principally at the Paris Opéra and Opéra-Comique but also elsewhere in France and abroad, and who left some recordings representative of his repertoire.

== Life and career ==
Born Louis Claver, his career commenced in 1935, as a knight in Parsifal, at the Opéra.

During his career at the Palais Garnier, Noguéra went on to sing roles such as Wagner and Valentin in Faust, the pilot in Tristan und Isolde, the Nightwatchman and Beckmesser in Die Meistersinger von Nürnberg, Apollo in Alceste (Gluck), Torello in Monna Vanna, several parts in Mârouf, savetier du Caire, Phorbas in Œdipe, Alberich in Das Rheingold, the Grand Prêtre de Moloch in Salammbô, the title role in Rigoletto, Faninal in Der Rosenkavalier, Masetto and Leporello in Don Giovanni, Papageno in The Magic Flute, Iago in Otello, and Ali in Les Indes galantes.

His debut at the Opéra-Comique came in 1945 with Escamillo in Carmen, and he took part in the premiere of Busser's Carosse du Saint Sacrement, and continued at the Salle Favart for over 20 years where his other roles included Guglielmo in Così fan tutte, Lescaut in Manon, Ourrias in Mireille and the title role in The Marriage of Figaro.

In 1949 he appeared as Shylock in a revival of Reynaldo Hahn's Le marchand de Venise alongside Denise Duval, Jean Giraudeau, Louis Froumenty, and Huc-Santana, conducted by D.-E. Inghelbrecht. In La Basoche at Monte Carlo in 1954, he sang with Denise Duval, Nadine Renaux and Pierre Mollet, conducted by Albert Wolff. In December 1965 he was the producer of the premiere performances of La Princesse de Clèves by Jean Françaix at Rouen's Théâtre des Arts (libretto by the composer and Marc Lanjean); Genevieve Marcaux and Marcel Huylbrock played the lovers, with Jacques Jansen as the discreet husband, conducted by Pierre-Michel Le Conte.

Outside France he sang at Covent Garden in London in 1937, and in Belgium and Italy.

He was professor of singing at the Conservatoire de Paris from 1955 to 1979.

== Recordings ==
Noguéra participated in recordings of baroque motets by N Bernier, M-A Charpentier, and C-H Gervais conducted by Louis Martini for Pathé in 1957. He sang Nourabad in the complete studio recording of Les pêcheurs de perles in 1954 with Opéra-Comique forces under André Cluytens, and as Yorloff in excerpts from the same composer's Ivan IV in 1957 under Georges Tzipine. With Cluytens conducting he also took part in complete recordings of L'Enfance du Christ in 1950 for Pathé, and the Fauré Requiem, op. 48, in 1950 for Columbia. In a complete recording (later extended highlights) from La Périchole under Igor Markevich in 1958 he sang Don Andrès.
