= Hélène Bouvier =

French operatic mezzo-soprano

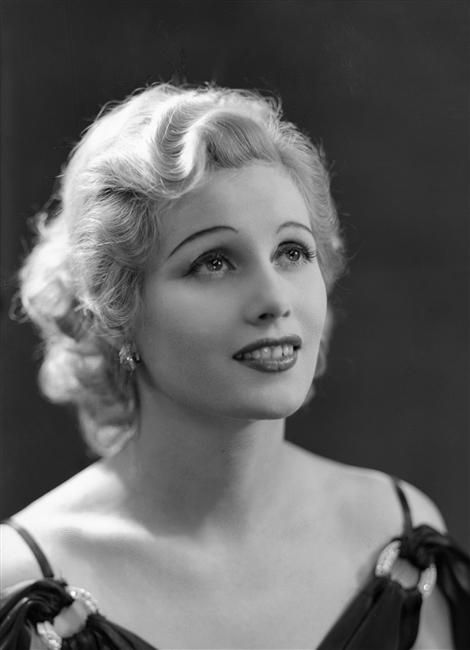

Hélène Bouvier (June 20, 1905 in Paris – March 11, 1978 in Paris) was a French operatic mezzo-soprano, particularly associated with the French repertoire.

She studied at the Paris Conservatory and made her debut in Nantes in the title role of Gluck's Orfeo ed Euridice, in 1930. She then left for Argentina where she sang at the Teatro Colón in Buenos Aires.

Back in France, she made her debut at both the Palais Garnier and the Opéra-Comique during the 1938-39 season, where she quickly established herself in roles such as Carmen, Dalila, Charlotte, Geneviève, the mother in Louise, etc.

She made guest appearances at La Scala in Milan, La Monnaie in Brussels, the Monte Carlo Opera, also appearing in Dresden and Leipzig, the Holland Festival, and again at the Teatro Colón from 1949 until 1965.

She took part in the creation of contemporary works, notably Maurice Duruflé's Requiem and Darius Milhaud's Bolivar. She was also admired in Arthur Honegger's Antigone and Igor Stravinsky's Oedipus rex.

She retired from the stage in 1967 and taught in Paris.

== Selected recording ==
- Hector Berlioz : L'Enfance du Christ, op. 25 (solos), Hélène Bouvier, Jean Giraudeau, Michel Roux, Louis Noguéra, Chœurs Raymond Saint-Paul, Orchestre de la Société des Concerts du Conservatoire, conducted by André Cluytens (Pathé) [recorded in June 1951]. Reissued CD by Parlophone (Erato-Warner) in 2017, box « André Cluytens : the complete orchestral & concerto recordings », Cascavelle in 2019, box « Hector Berlioz : enregistrements inoubliables ». Disponible sur YouTube.
- Camille Saint-Saëns : Samson et Dalila, Hélène Bouvier, José Luccioni, Charles Cambon, Orchestre de l'Opéra de Paris, conducted by Louis Fourestier, (1946), (CD Naxos)
- Henri Duparc : 13 mélodies, Jacqueline Bonneau, piano. LP Pathé 1958, reissued CD Les introuvables Classica vol. 25 2022
