= Roméo et Juliette discography =

Recordings of Gounod's opera

This is a list of audio and video recordings (discography) of Charles Gounod's 1867 French opera Roméo et Juliette.

== Audio recordings ==
Year	Cast (Juliette, Roméo, Frère Laurent, Mercutio)	Conductor, Opera house and orchestra	Label
1912	Yvonne Gall, Agustarello Affre, Marcel Journet, Alexis Boyer	François Ruhlmann, Opéra-Comique Orchestra and Chorus	CD: VAI; Cat: VAIA 1064-3
1947	Bidu Sayão, Jussi Björling, Nicola Moscona, John Brownlee	Emil Cooper, Metropolitan Opera Orchestra and Chorus	CD: Sony Classical; Streaming audio: Met Opera on Demand
1953	Janine Micheau, Raoul Jobin, Heinz Rehfuss, Pierre Mollet	Alberto Erede, Théâtre National de l'Opéra, Paris	CD: Decca; Cat: 443 539-2
1968	Mirella Freni, Franco Corelli, Xavier Depraz, Henri Gui	Alain Lombard, Paris Opera Orchestra and Chorus	CD: EMI; Cat: CMS5 65290-2
1983	Patricia Wise, José Carreras, Kurt Rydl, Enric Serra	Jacques Delacôte, Gran Teatre del Liceu Orchestra and Chorus	CD: Allegro; Cat: OPD-1203
1983	Catherine Malfitano, Alfredo Kraus, José van Dam, Gino Quilico	Michel Plasson, Toulouse Capitole Orchestra and Chorus	CD: EMI; Cat: 7 47365 8
1995	Angela Gheorghiu, Roberto Alagna, José van Dam, Simon Keenlyside	Michel Plasson, Toulouse Capitole Orchestra and Chorus	CD: EMI; Cat: 640700-2
1995	Ruth Ann Swenson, Plácido Domingo, Alastair Miles, Kurt Ollmann	Leonard Slatkin, Munich Radio Orchestra and Chorus	CD: RCA Victor; Cat: 09026 68440-2

== Video recordings ==
Year	Cast (Juliette, Roméo, Frère Laurent, Mercutio)	Conductor, Opera house and orchestra (video details)	Label
1994	Leontina Vaduva, Roberto Alagna, Robert Lloyd, François Le Roux	Charles Mackerras, Royal Opera House Orchestra and Chorus (Recorded live, Royal Opera House, stage director: Nicolas Joël)	DVD: Opus Arte; DVD: Kultur
2002	Angela Gheorghiu, Roberto Alagna, František Zahradníček, Vratislav Kříž	Anton Guadagno, Czech Philharmonic Chamber Orchestra and Chorus (Recorded live, Zvíkov Castle, film director: Barbara Willis Sweete)	DVD: ArtHaus Musik; Cat: 100 706; Blu-ray: ArtHaus Musik; Cat: 109262
2007	Anna Netrebko, Roberto Alagna, Robert Lloyd, Nathan Gunn	Plácido Domingo, Metropolitan Opera Orchestra and Chorus (Recorded live, 15 December 2007, Metropolitan Opera House (Lincoln Center))	HD video: Met Opera on Demand
2008	Nino Machaidze, Rolando Villazón, Mikhail Petrenko, Russell Braun	Yannick Nézet-Séguin, Mozarteum Orchestra Salzburg, Salzburg Festival (Recorded live, Felsenreitschule, staging: Bartlett Sher, director: Brian Large)	Blu-ray: Deutsche Grammophon; Cat: 073 4521
2011	Nino Machaidze, Stefano Secco, Giorgio Giuseppini, Artur Ruciński	Fabio Mastrangelo, Arena di Verona Festival Orchestra and Chorus (Recorded live, August 2011, Arena di Verona, stage director: Francesco Micheli)	Blu-ray: BelAir Classiques; Cat: BAC 481
2017	Diana Damrau, Vittorio Grigolo, Mikhail Petrenko, Elliot Madore	Gianandrea Noseda, Metropolitan Opera Orchestra and Chorus (Recorded live, 21 January 2017, Metropolitan Opera House (Lincoln Center), staging: Bartlett Sher)	HD video: Met Opera on Demand
2018	Aida Garifullina, Saimir Pirgu, Nicola Ulivieri, Gabriel Bermúdez	Josep Pons, Gran Teatre del Liceu Orchestra and Chorus (Recorded live, 27 February 2018, Gran Teatre del Liceu, director: Stephen Lawless)	Blu-ray: C Major
2023	Julie Fuchs, Benjamin Bernheim, Brent Michael Smith, Yuriy Hadzetskyy	Roberto Forés Veses, Zurich Opera, Philharmonia Zurich (Recorded live, stage director: Ted Huffman)	HD video: Accentus Music
2024	Nadine Sierra, Benjamin Bernheim, Alfred Walker, Will Liverman	Yannick Nézet-Séguin, Metropolitan Opera Orchestra and Chorus (Recorded live, 23 March 2024, Metropolitan Opera House (Lincoln Center), staging: Bartlett Sher)	HD video: Met Opera on Demand
