= Marcel Cariven =

French conductor

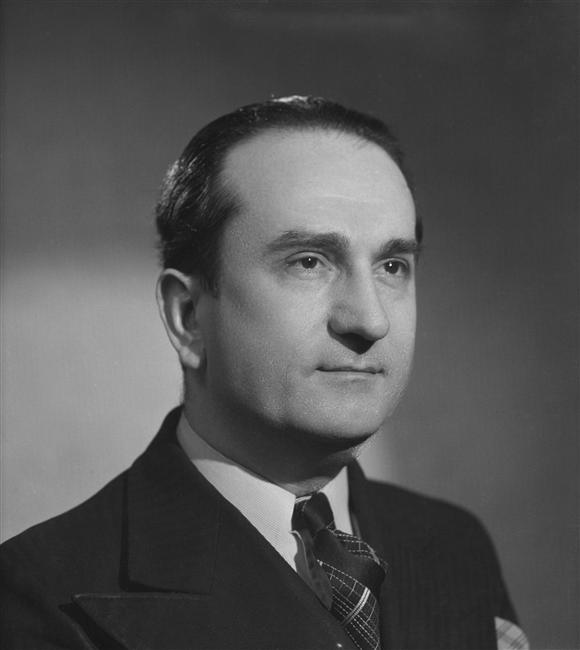
- Cariven, 1939
- Born: April 18, 1894; Toulouse, France
- Died: November 5, 1979 (aged 85); Crosne,_Essonne, France
- Occupation: Conductor

Marcel Auguste Antoine Cariven (18 April 1894 – 5 November 1979), was a French conductor, particularly associated with light music and with operetta.

== Life and career ==
Cariven undertook musical studies firstly at the conservatoire in Toulouse, then in Paris, where he was a pupil of Xavier Leroux, Paul Vidal, and André Gedalge where he won first prizes in harmony, music history and composition.

Having led the orchestra of several musical theatres in Paris, Cariven conducted one for the first time at the Théâtre de l'Apollo in La Veuve Joyeuse. This was followed by many other lyric engagements, including the Bouffes-Parisiens, Marigny, Mogador and Gaîté-Lyrique.

However, he was also active in symphonic music, ballet and film music and worked with composers such as André Messager, Reynaldo Hahn, Maurice Yvain and Louis Beydts. During the 1930s at Théâtre des Bouffes Parisiens he conducted Azor, an opérette by Gaston Gabaroche in 1932, followed by La Pouponnière and Un soir de réveillon the same year, Ô mon bel inconnu, a comédie musicale by Reynaldo Hahn in 1933 with Arletty and Simone Simon among the cast, Toi c'est moi in 1934, and Trois valses, an operetta with music from the Strauss family (Johann I, Johann II and Oscar) in 1937 in a production by Pierre Fresnay, with Yvonne Printemps among the cast. During the war years he conducted a revival of Les cent vierges by Lecocq in September 1942 at the Apollo theatre in Paris.

Cariven made his debut at the Paris Opéra-Comique in December 1947 with Manon. From the 1950s to the early 1970s he was active at French Radio, conducting many operetta recordings some of which have subsequently been issued commercially.

For one of his last performances, the Opera critic noted about Offenbach's La fille du tambour-major that "the veteran Marcel Cariven... may, like some other senior conductors, stagger to the rostrum, but once there he knows how to bring out all the lightness and gaiety of Offenbach's score, and the orchestra and cast headed by Dominique Tirmont and some of the best Offenbach singers in France - Michael Pieri, Florence Raynal, Jean-Christophe Benoît, Bernard Plantey - so obviously enjoy working with him”.

== Recordings ==
Cariven made several recordings in the 1930s and 40s, and later for French radio:

Hahn - Beaucoup de bruit pour rien 'musique de scène' (1936, Voix de son maître)
Schubert songs (Ständchen, Die Forelle and others) with the tenor Georges Thill (1935, Columbia)
Pierné - Fragonard - two excerpts (1943, Pathé)
Donizetti - Don Pasquale - excerpts, with Vina Bovy and Luis Mariano (1944 Voix de son maître)
Adam - Si j'étais roi - Overture, with Orchestre Lamoureux (1947, Pathé)
Planquette - Les Cloches de Corneville with Orchestre Lamoureux (1947, Pathé)
Waldteufel - various waltzes (1943, 1945, 1947, Pathé)
Audran - Le Grand Mogol - excerpts with the Orchestre Lamoureux (1948, Pathé)
Offenbach - La Grande-Duchesse de Gérolstein - excerpts with the Orchestre Lamoureux (1948, Pathé)
Hahn - Ciboulette with l'Orchestre de la Société des Concerts du Conservatoire (1952, Pathé)
Christiné - Phi-Phi - selection (1952, Pathé)
Hervé - Mam'zelle Nitouche - selection (1953, Pathé)
Varney - Les Mousquetaires au couvent (1953, Pathé)
Hervé - Le Retour d'Ulysse and Trombolino, with Jean Giraudeau and Denise Duval (1956, Gaieté Lyrique)
Lehár - Le Pays des Sourires (1956, Pathé)
Offenbach - La Vie parisienne (1956, Philips)
Lehár - Frasquita (1956, Véga)
Scotto - Violettes impériales (1961, Véga)
Lecocq - Ali Baba (1961, Classical Moments)
Offenbach - La Créole (1969, Bourg)
