= Fanély Revoil =

French singer (1906–1999)

Fanély Revoil (25 September 1906 – 31 January 1999) was a French singer who had a major career in opera and operetta between the 1930s and 1989. She was married to theater director Robert Ancelin from 1937 to 1942.

== Career ==
After starting work as a secretary Revoil followed courses in singing and acting at the Marseille Conservatoire, making her debut in Montpellier in 1928 in Gillette de Narbonne (which also marked her farewell to the stage in 1957), then appeared in Mulhouse in Comtesse Maritza, before joining the company in Le Havre, singing in operettas from both the Paris and Vienna traditions (including the French premiere of Frasquita), as well as in Carmen. In 1933, she made her first appearances in Paris, at the Théâtre de la Porte Saint-Martin in small roles before creating Madame Dubarry in the French premiere of La Dubarry. Following this success, others followed including Paris premieres of creations in Valses de Vienne (1933), Le Tzaréwitch (1935), Un coup de veine (1935), Au soleil du Mexique (1935) and La Belle traversée (1937).

After the Porte Saint Martin she made her debut at the Opéra-Comique (creating the role of Lucine in Le testament de la tante Caroline), and although never a member of the company she sang regularly with them for ten years, including Lazuli in L'étoile, la Guimard in Fragonard and the title role in Ciboulette. Revoil appeared many times at the Théâtre du Châtelet, in Soleil du Mexique, Nina Rosa, Rose-Marie, and created the title role in La Maréchale sans-gêne there in 1948. At the Théâtre des Champs-Élysées she performed in the premiere of Virginie Dejazet in 1946.

She made many foreign tours (Portugal, Netherlands, Italy, Britain) often alongside Willy Clément. After retiring from the stage she taught operetta singing at the Paris Conservatoire.

== Recordings and broadcasts ==
As well as the 1941 recording of excerpts from L'étoile under Roger Désormière and the complete 1948 recording of The Tales of Hoffmann under André Cluytens, Revoil sang in many French radio recordings of operettas and opéra-comiques during the 1950s, including several of La Périchole, and appeared in the film Les deux gamines in 1936.
