= Mariette Sully =

Belgian opera singer

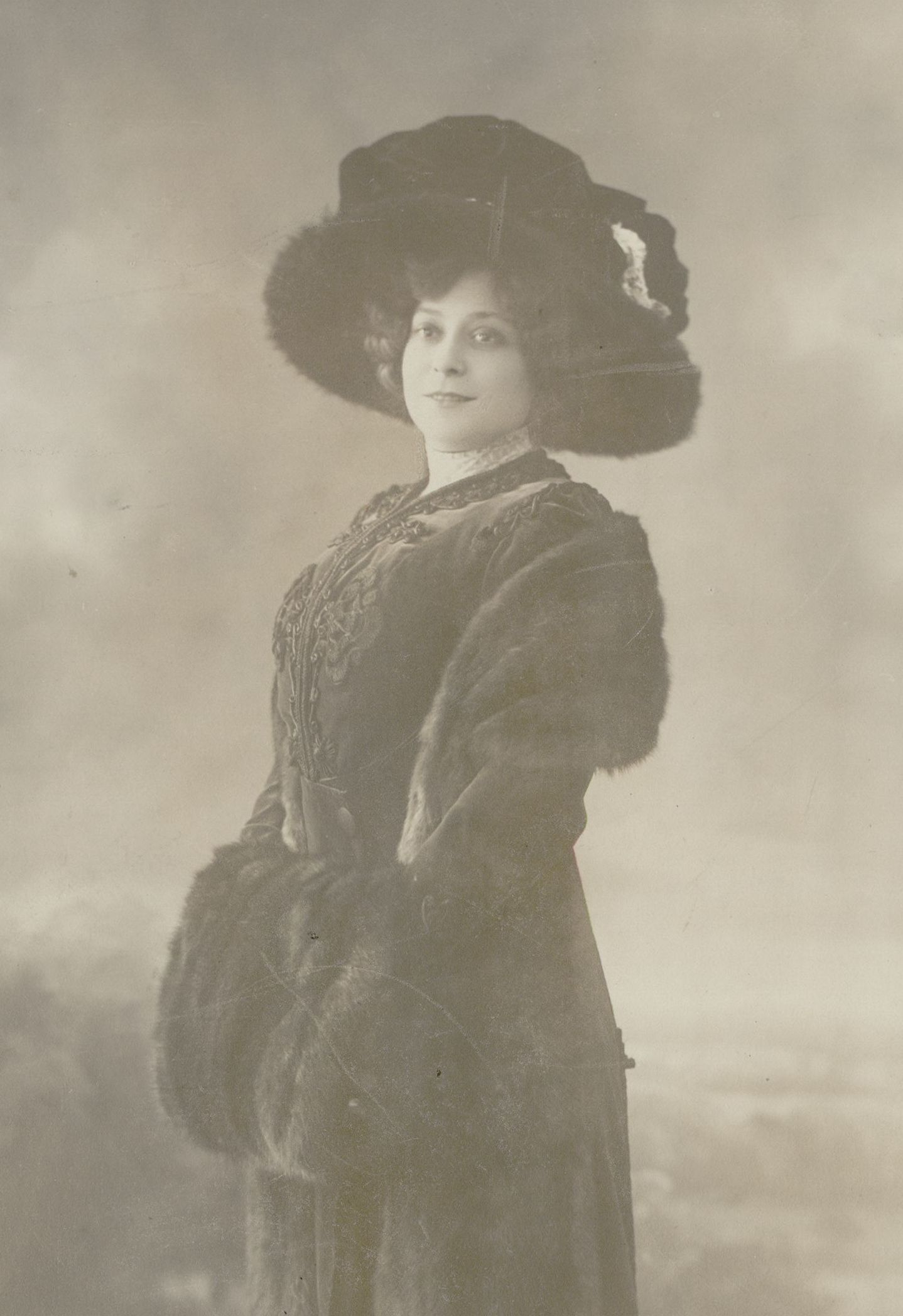
Mariette Sully in 1910

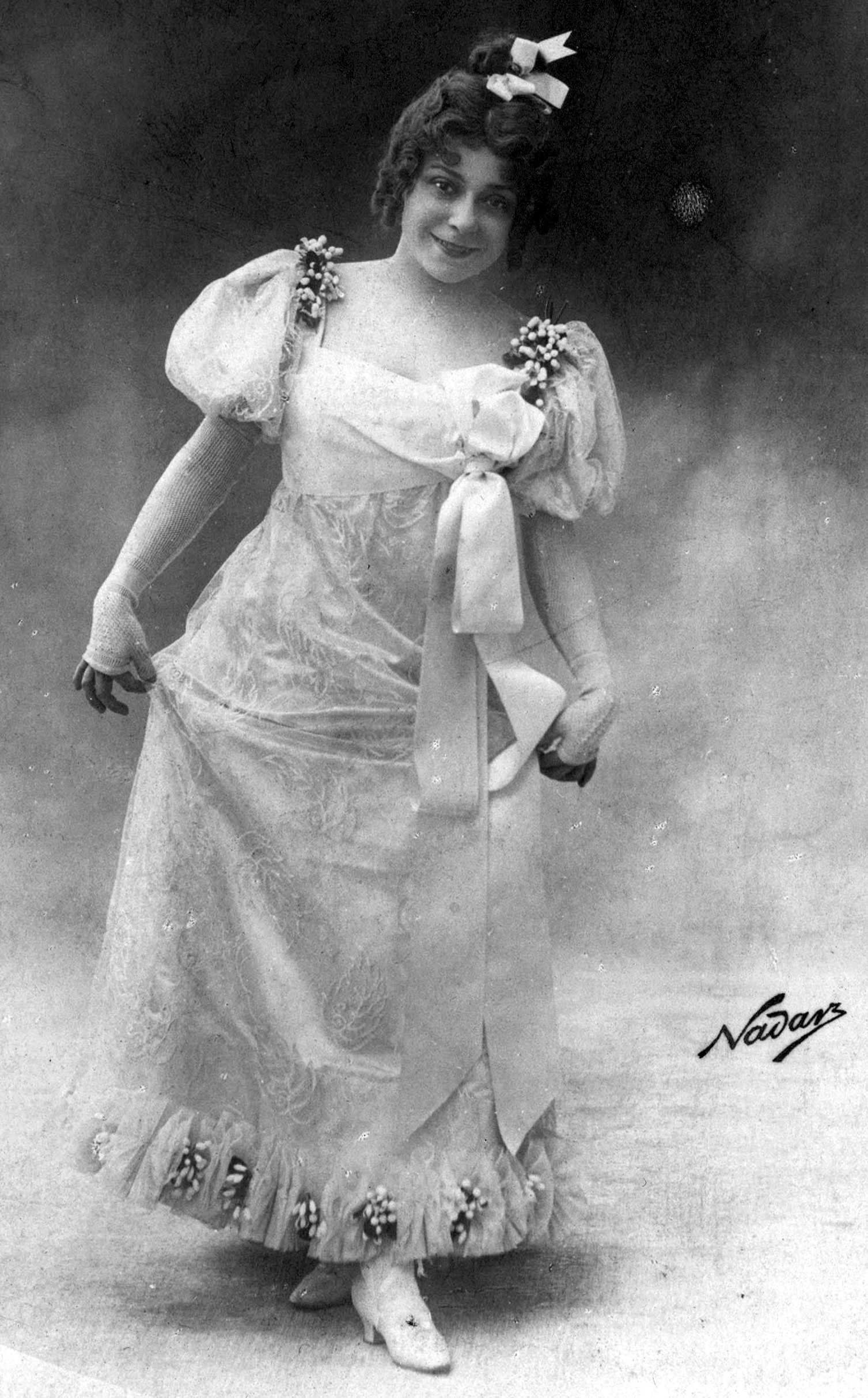
Mariette Sully in André Messager's Les p'tites Michu at the Théâtre des Folies-Dramatiques in 1900

Mariette Sully (1878–1950) was a Belgian soprano who was principally active in operetta in France.

== Career ==
Sully was born in Brussels on December 9, 1878. After leaving school she began working in the theatre, making her debut at the Casino in Nice in Lecocq's La petite mariée. After appearing in Monte-Carlo she moved to Bucharest where she sang Irma in Audran's Le grand mogol.

Her career took off in 1894: she joined the Bouffes-Parisiens, making her debut there creating the role of Clotilde in Varnay's Les Forains (February 1894), and Edwige in Le bonhomme de neige by Antoine Banès (April 1894). June that year saw her at the Théâtre des Menus-Plaisirs in the title role of Audran's Miss Helyett alongside Jean Périer. In October at the Théâtre de la Gaîté she was singing Kate in Planquette's Rip. At the Gaîté in 1896 she created Alesia in Audran's La poupée.

For Messager she created the title role of Véronique in 1898, again with Périer, and repeated it many times, including London in 1903. She also created Éponine in Shakespeare! by Serpette, Cyprienne in Messager's Les dragons de l'Impératrice (1905), Lisbeth in Ganne's Hans, le Joueur de flute (1906) and Ginette in Les maris de Ginette (1916). In September 1935 she was in the premiere of La Nuit est belle by Goublier (playing Madame Denizot) at the Théâtre Antoine.

A benefit was given in her honour at the Théâtre Sarah Bernhardt in 1925. Sully died at the age of 75 on April 7, 1950, in Paris' 7th district.

== Film ==
A short amount of experimental film with cylinder sound exists from 1900, with Sully as the doll in Audran's La poupée. She also appeared in two films in the 1930s, L’Enfant de l’amour (1930) and La chanson du souvenir (1936).
