= Blaise le savetier =

Opéra comique by François-André Danican Philidor

- Opéra comique by François-André Danican Philidor
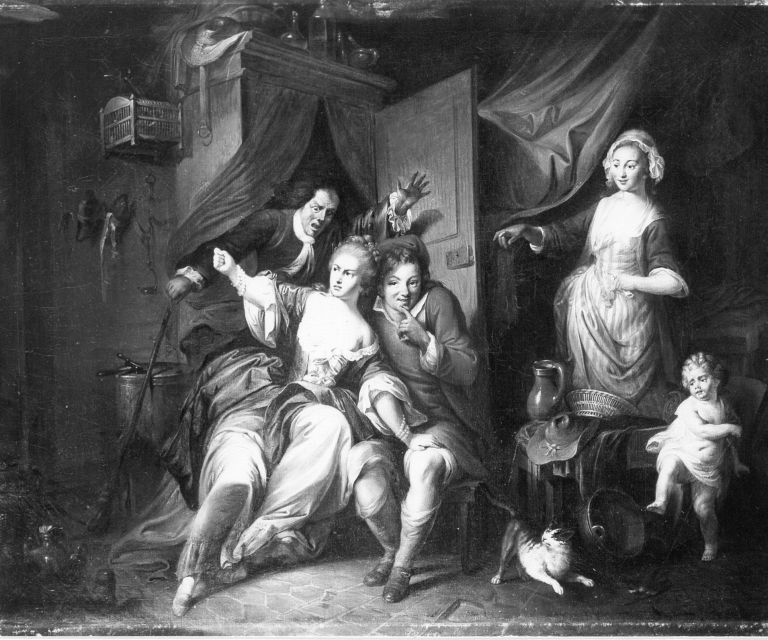
- Scene from the opera, painted by Johann Christian von Mannlich, 1763
- Translation: Blaise the Cobbler
- Librettist: Michel-Jean Sedaine
- Language: French
- Based on: Jean de La Fontaine's "Conte d'une chose arrivée à Château-Thierry"
- Premiere: 9 March 1759; Foire St Laurent, Paris

Blaise le savetier (Blaise the Cobbler) is a 1759 one-act opéra comique, by the French composer François-André Danican Philidor. The libretto was by Michel-Jean Sedaine, after a story by Jean de La Fontaine entitled Conte d'une chose arrivée à Château-Thierry.

== Performance history ==
The first complete opéra comique by the composer, it was premiered by the Opéra-Comique at the Foire St Germain in Paris on 9 March 1759. Very successful in Paris, the work was also performed in French in Brussels in January 1760, and The Hague in 1760. It was revived at the Hôtel de Bourgogne on 3 February 1762 in a double-bill with Monsigny's On ne s'avise jamais de tout for the inaugural performance of the new company formed by the merger of the Opera-Comique with the Théâtre-Italien. Further performances in French were given in Amsterdam beginning on 26 May 1762, Turin in the spring of 1765, Hanover on 17 July 1769, and Kassel on 21 July 1784. A more recent revival, conducted by André Cluytens, was given in the Salle Favart on 29 September 1949 with Lucienne Jourfier as Blaisine, Nadine Renaux as Mme Prince, Jean Giraudeau as Blaise, Serge Rallier as M. Prince, Jean Michel as Babiche, Michel Forel as Mathurin, and Guy Saint-Clair as Jeannot (Nicaise). Bampton Classical Opera performed the opera in English in 2012.

== Adaptations ==
It was translated into German by Johann Heinrich Faber and performed in Frankfurt in 1772 and Munich on 19 May 1785. An adaptation in Swedish was prepared by Carl Envallsson and performed in Stockholm on 21 April 1797. A Dutch version by J. T. Neyts was also published (no date). A German adaptation called Der Dorfbarbier with text by C. F. Weiße and music by Johann Adam Hiller was first produced in Leipzig in 1771. An English translation called The Landlord Outwitted or The Cobler's Wife was performed at Sadler's Wells on 23 June 1783 and 10 May 1784, and as Who Pays the Rent, or The Landlord Outwitted on 8 May 1787. An adaptation called The Cobler; or A Wife of Ten Thousand with text and music by Charles Dibdin was first produced in London at Drury Lane on 9 December 1774.

== Critical evaluation ==
Julian Rushton comments that the work "combines well-turned ariettes with [Philidor's] usual flair for ensemble writing, forming an excellent farce. Stylized laughter, sobbing and trembling anticipate later onomatopoeic effects, and the characterization, if simple, is already acute." Daniel Heartz has written that "the strengths of Philidor's art are already fully apparent in Blaise. His ability to characterize different personalities or actions simultaneously represents a breakthrough in opera, and not just in France." André Grétry asserted that Philidor was the first to create ensembles with contrasting rhythms, and that nothing like it had been heard in Italian theatres (where Grétry had studied in the 1760s). He credited Philidor's ability to produce these complex amalgams to his mastery of chess, and ranked Philidor on a level with Gluck "from the strength of the harmonic expression".

== Roles ==
Role	Voice type	Premiere cast, 9 March 1759
Blaise	tenor	Oudinot
Blaisine	soprano	Deschamps
Mme Pince, the landlady	soprano	Vincent
M Pince, her husband	baritone	Jean-Louis Laruette
Nicaise (Jeannot), Blaise's cousin	tenor	Bouret
Babiche, first bailiff	tenor	Vilmont
Mathurin, second bailiff	bass	De Lisle

== Synopsis ==
The story concerns an attractive, but penniless, young couple and a predatory landlady and her husband. The landlady tries to buy the favours of the young man, while her husband attempts to seduce his wife – with farcical results!
