= Edmée Favart =

French soprano

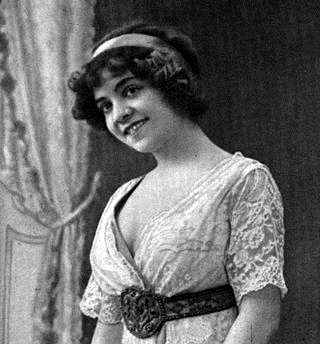
Edmée Favart

Edmée Favart (1879 – 29 October 1941) was a French soprano who had a varied and major career in opera and opéra comique and left many recordings of songs from roles she performed on stage.

== Life and career ==
Favart was born in Paris, the daughter of the baritone Edmond Favart and Zelie Weil, and appeared on stage with her father as a child in Algiers. She sang the Duchess in a 1904 revival of Le petit duc at the Théâtre des Variétés in Paris. In 1907 she joined the company of the Théâtre des Nouveautés in Brussels. By 1912, she had returned to Paris, and appeared at the Gaîté in La fille de Madame Angot and La fille du tambour-major. Favart made her debut at the Opéra-Comique on 20 June 1915 in Mignon (later singing the title role in the 1,500th performance of the opera at the theatre on 25 May 1919). She went on to sing Delphine (Cosi fan tutte), Clairette La fille de Madame Angot, Colette (La Basoche), Rose Friquet (Les dragons de Villars), Micaëla (Carmen), Cherubino (The marriage of Figaro), Rosenn (Le roi d'Ys), and Mimi (La boheme) at the Salle Favart.

Favart created leading roles in La petite fonctionnaire in 1921 and Ciboulette in 1923; she also appeared in revivals of Véronique, Madame l'archiduc and Le petit duc at the Théâtre Mogador.

She returned to the Opéra-Comique in 1925 for a single charity performance of Véronique.

She also sang in the premieres of Monsieur Dumollet (1922), Pépète (1925), Quand on est trois (1925), Mannequins (1925), Le Diable à Paris (1927), Une nuit au Louvre (1928), Boulard et ses filles (1929) and Sidonie Panache (1930).

Favart retired in 1935, as Mme Paul Gazagne. She died in Marseille.

== Recordings ==
Favart recorded two excerpts from Phi-Phi in 1919 (Pathé) and various songs from Ciboulette from the year of its premiere (Pathé 1919, with Henry Defreyn and André Baugé).

She set down records of numbers from Mannequins, Quand on est trois, No, No, Nanette, Le Diable à Paris, Boulard et ses filles, Le Chant du désert and Sidonie Panache. Two more Messager operettas appear on her discography; Coups de roulis (Polydor, 1932), and Passionément (Pathé 1932).

Her recordings also include songs from Le petit duc, Les travaux d'Hercule, Les charbonniers and Madame Favart (Pathé, 1934).
