= Louis Urgel =

French composer

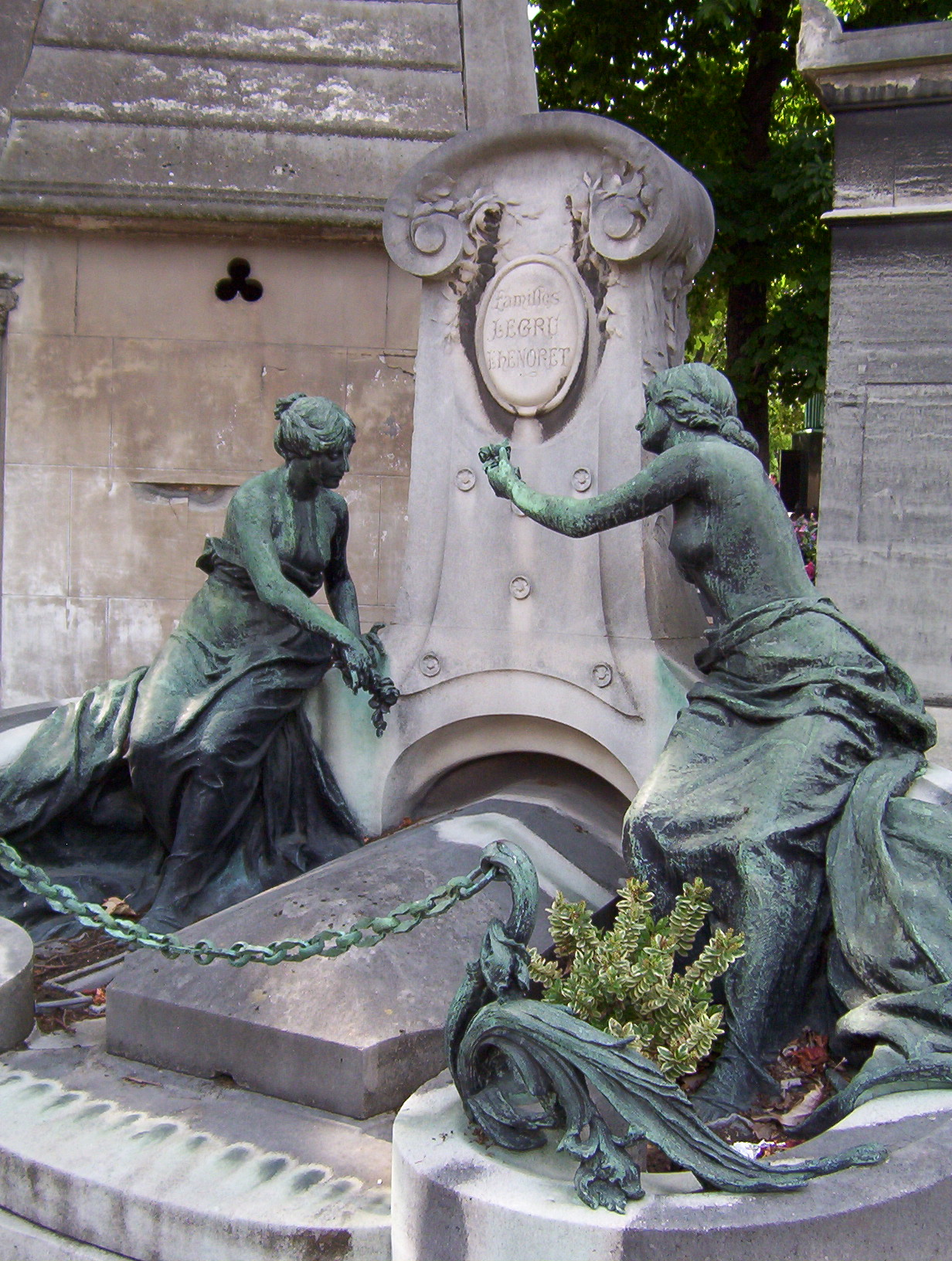
Legru (Urgel) and Lhenoret's tombstone at Père Lachaise Cemetery, in Paris.

Louis Urgel (23 September 1857 – 17 August 1942) was the male name under which Louise Legru, née L'Henoret, published her musical compositions. She was one of the few French female composers of light music in the 1920s. Her Vieux Garçons! was first performed in Paris at the Théâtre de la Gaîte-Lyrique on February 21, 1931.

She was married to Hector Legru.

== Works ==
Selected works include:

- 1911: Aux petits Enfants, poem by Alphonse Daudet.
- 1920: Les Chagrins, for singing and piano.
- 1922: Monsieur Dumollet, three-act operetta, libretto by Victor Jannet, lyrics by Hugues Delorme
- 1923: Amour de princesse, three-act operetta, libretto by Victor Jeannet and Hugues Delorme
- 1925: Qu'en dit l'abbé?, opérette galante in three acts, libretto by Jacques Battaille-Henri
- 1928: Une nuit au Louvre, three-act operetta, libretto by Henri Duvernois, lyrics by René Dorin
- 1931: Vieux Garçons, conducted by Jules Gressier
