= La poupée =

Opera by Edmond Audran

Programme for 1897 London production

La poupée (The Doll) is an opéra comique in a prelude and three acts composed by Edmond Audran with a libretto by Maurice Ordonneau. The libretto was based on E.T.A. Hoffmann's Der Sandmann, about a friar who falsely promises to marry his rich uncle's daughter to fool his uncle into giving money to the monastery; the scheme involves creating a doll that looks like the daughter. Then, the uncle's daughter fools the friar into marrying her by substituting herself for the doll.

== Productions ==
The opera opened at the Théâtre de la Gaîté, Paris, on 21 October 1896. It then played at the Prince of Wales Theatre in London, opening on 24 February 1897, with an English libretto in two acts by Arthur Sturgess. It ran for 576 performances in London, starring Courtice Pounds and Willie Edouin; Edna May later played in the piece. On 11 September 1897, a single matinée performance of La Poupée at the Prince of Wales Theatre launched a British provincial tour with a new company. The opera also had a Broadway production in 1897.

Along with Miss Helyett (1890), La poupée was one of Audran's last successes.

== Roles ==
Role	Voice type	Premiere cast (conductor)
Father Maxime	baritone	Lucien Noel
Lancelot, a monk	tenor	Paul Fugère
Chanterelle	tenor	Paul Bert
Lorèmois, Chanterelle's friend	tenor	Bienfait
Balthazar, a monk	tenor	Jaltier
Agnelet, a monk	tenor	Bernard
Benoit, a monk	bass	Geoffroy
Basilique, a monk	bass	Fumat
Hilarius	tenor	Dacheux
Madame Hilarius	soprano	Gilles-Rainbault
Alesia, Hilarius's daughter	soprano	Mariette Sully
Guduline		Brandon
Henri		
Pierre, Hilarius's assistant		
Jacques		
Marie		

== Synopsis ==
Maxime and his fellow monks are penniless and starving. A new member of the monastery, Lancelot, asks his rich uncle for aid. The uncle will assist the friars, but only if Lancelot gets married. The monks scheme to trick the uncle by using one of puppet master Hilarius's dolls, pretending that it is Lancelot's wife. Hilarius's newest puppet was made to look similar to Alesia, his daughter. At the wedding, however, Alesia masquerades as the doll, because she loves Lancelot. Lancelot does not discover that he has married the real Alesia until the wedding is over. Now he must leave the monastery with his wife, but the friars receive the generous sum of money from his uncle.

== Musical numbers (from English-language adaptation) ==
- Overture

Act I – Scene 1 – The Monastery

- No. 1 – Opening Chorus and Song – Lancelot – "Alas! with lean and empty scrip the Brotherhood are now returning..."
- No. 1a – Exit of Chorus – "Yes, though we're poor in luck of late, and all our hearts are full of sorrow..."
- No. 2 – Song – Father Maxime – "Soon you are to see life and much adventure..."
- No. 3 – Bell Chorus, with Father Maxime and Lancelot – "Hark, how the bell is ringing, here we come with speed..."

Act I – Scene 2 – Hilarius's Workshop

- No. 4 – Workmen's Chorus – "We are workmen waiting for our payment; automatic dolls we make..."
- No. 4a – *Exit of Chorus (reprise) – "We are workmen waiting for our payment..."
- No. 5 – Song – Alesia – "With careless eye I saw him there, and love took rest within my heart..."
- No. 6 – Song – Lancelot – "If in a cell your life is pass'd, nought of temptation you will see..."
- No. 7 – Trio – Alesia, Lancelot and Hilarius – "I can dance and sing and chatter, though my speech is rather disjointed..."
- No. 8 – Duet – Alesia and Lancelot – "I love you very dearly; my hand and heart at your feet I lay..."
- No. 9 – Finale Act I – "Come, let us now to work, our task we never shirk..."

Act II – Scene 1 – Chanterelle's Country House

- No. 9a – Entr'acte
- No. 10 – Opening Chorus – "Now we appear, neighbours and friends; news that we hear, none can disparage..."
- No. 11 – Duet – Chanterelle and Loremois – "This wicked world I've wander'd round, 'mid pleasant scenes and others not..."
- No. 12 – Trio – Alesia, Chanterelle and Loremois – "Ah! Lancelot is not yet here; perhaps 'tis Chanterelle I see..."
- No. 13 – Quartette – Chanterelle, Loremois, Lancelot and Hilarius – "Though manners change, a girl so strange..."
- No. 14 – Duet – Lancelot and Alesia – "Happy world, such maidens possessing if like to thee..."
- No. 15 – Ensemble – "Here are the wedding guests, who come to see the bridegroom and the blushing bride..."
- No. 16 – Chorus – "After them we go! Follow them, stop them in their flight! Bring them back ere fall of night! ..."

Act II – Scene 2 – Another part of the Monastery

- No. 17 – Chorus – "'Tis night, and brother Lancelot has not returned from his adventure to keep the vow of his indenture..."
- No. 18 – Song – Father Maxime – "A jovial monk am I, contented with my lot. The world without this gate I flout..."
- No. 19 – Chorus of Monks – "Oh, strange device, so nearly true to life, 'tis worth the price he's paid for such a wife..."
- No. 20 – Song – Alesia – "A poor little dummy am I, but still my intellect is shining..."
- No. 21 – Exit of Monks – "Creature false and frail as that she's representing, not in strength we fail, not a whit we relent..."
- No. 22 – Duet – Alesia and Lancelot – "Was it a kiss? Sweetest caress! Token of bliss and happiness! ..."
- No. 23 – Finale Act II – "And now I mean to leave this place, to start another kind of life..."

Supplementary numbers

- No. 24 – Extra Song – Lancelot – "I went to town a simple youth as many more have done..."
- No. 25 – Extra Song – Alesia – "'Tis the Springtime of love, with all its store of gladness..."

== Adaptations ==
Ernst Lubitsch filmed an adaptation of the story under the title Die Puppe (lit. 'The Doll'; 1919).
