= Jean-Christophe Benoît =

French opera singer

Jean-Christophe Benoît (18 March 1925 – 21 February 2019) was a French baritone, who enjoyed a long career in France and francophone countries on the stage, the concert platform and radio and television. He was born in Paris into a professional musical family, and finished his career there as a teacher.

== Life and career ==
His parents were musicians, and he began young to discover his musical talents. Attending the Paris Conservatoire, his tutors included Olivier Messiaen (harmony), Noel Gallon (counterpoint) and Gabriel Dubois (vocal studies).

Composing at this time, Benoît provided incidental music for Yves Joly's Théâtre de Marionnettes in Paris, while soon establishing a career on the stage and concert platform, his vocal style lending itself toward opéra-comique.

In the early 1950s Benoît began studio recording; his Mathurin being described in Opera on Record as "even at this early stage of his career Jean-Christophe Benoît's wit was readily flourished; his rustic accent is hilarious" He sang Dancaïre in Carmen in four separate studio versions.

He sang in the world premiere of Madame de ... by Jean-Michel Damase in Monte Carlo on 22 March 1970 (libretto by Jean Anouilh after the novel by Louise de Vilmorin) conducted by the composer. Frank Martin wrote Pilate for him, and it was created in Rome in 1964. He also sang in the premiere of the opera Comme il vous plaira by Pierre Hasquenoph in Strasbourg in 1982.

Although Benoît mainly appeared in French operatic roles at the Opéra-Comique and Opéra his repertoire was wide, ranging from Monteverdi to contemporary works, but often of music requiring dramatic effect. In September 1976 he appeared in Turandot in Geneva (with Birgit Nilsson in the title role, conducted by Giuseppe Patanè). Outside France he appeared at La Scala (Torquemada in L'Heure espagnole) and Geneva (Figaro in La Mère coupable).

In Brussels his roles included Momus in Platée (1968), Guillaume Mericy in La passion de Gilles (1983 – world premiere), Schlemil in Les Contes d'Hoffmann (1985), Baron Douphol in La Traviata (1987) and Der Baron in Der ferne Klang (1988).

From 1970 to 1990 he was a professor at the Paris Conservatoire; he was also an invited tutor at the Centre d'Art (JMC) du Mont-Orford in Quebec.

== Recording ==
His many recordings include:

- Mathurin (L'ivrogne corrigé) Nixa 1952
- Dancaïre (Carmen), Vox 1956, His Master's Voice 1958, RCA 1963, Ariola-Eurodisc 1970
- Momus (Platée) Pathé 1956
- Panatellas (La Périchole) French Columbia 1958
- solos (Le Bourgeois gentilhomme) SMS 1966
- Coquenard (Véronique), World Record Club 1968
- Le bailli (Werther) His Master's Voice 1969
- Frédéric (Lakmé) EMI 1970
- Barnabé (Le maître de chapelle) Barclay Inédits 1970
- Orcan (Les Paladins) CBS 1972
- Ali (Les Indes Galantes) CBS 1973
- Le Podestat (Le Docteur Miracle) Barclay Inédits 1973
- Le Brésilien, Frick and Prosper (La Vie parisienne), EMI 1975
- Grenu/Le marquis (Ciboulette) EMI 1982

Benoît appeared with his sister in (among others) the Lully above, and in a series of French folk and popular songs recorded in the 1950s for the Club National du disque and Ducretet-Thomson. He sang the vocal numbers on the 1973 CBS LP 'Concert à la cour d'Henri IV', with the Grande Écurie et la Chambre du Roy directed by Jean-Claude Malgoire. He recorded Ravel's Histoires naturelles on Selmer in the 1950s, the Chansons villageoises, Le Bal masqué and Le Bestiare by Poulenc on Pathé in 1965, mélodies by Reynaldo Hahn and Au pays de la magie by Maurice Le Roux, with Georges Pludermacher, piano on Adès, 1974. Accompanied by Bernard Ringeissen, he recorded an LP of sixteen songs by József Kosma for Disques Adès in 1976.

He provided the narration for the French versions of Britten's Young Person's Guide to the Orchestra and Prokofiev's Peter and the Wolf with Hans Swarowsky conducting the Pro Musica Orchester Wien.

He appeared in a large number of broadcasts on French radio and television, singing many French premieres, of works by Baudrier, Britten, Delerue, Nigg, Prokofiev and Semenoff. Among operatic recordings for French radio were Le Marquis de Pontcalé (in La Camargo), Ouf (L'Étoile), Gaston (Rayon des soieries), Charles Martel (Geneviève de Brabant) and Sganarelle (Le Médecin malgré lui).

== Family ==
His mother (Léontine Benoît-Granier, died 1957) was a musician and composer, while his father Henri Benoît was a notable viola player in Paris, who was a member of the Capet Quartet in the 1920s, participating in several of their recordings during that period. His sister, Denise Benoît (1919–1973) was a popular and much recorded soprano and actress. Mother, son and daughter appeared together on record in Chants de France : Mountabo la marmite ('Bourrée d'Auvergne') on Ducretet-Thomson LPG 8 220.
