= Willy Clément =

French operatic singer

Willy Clément (born in Cairo on 19 July 1918, died in Paris on 7 March 1965) was a French baritone who was noted in light baritone roles and operetta.

== Life and career ==
Clément came to France at a young age, and entered the Conservatoire de Paris in November 1938, in the classes of Claire Croiza (singing), Georges Viseur (theory), and Vanni Marcoux (stage declamation). Due to the war, he completed his studies in Lyon, and graduated in July 1941, joining the Théâtre des Quatre Saisons Provinciales and singing at the Lyon Opera in the 1942–43 and 1943-44 seasons. He made his debut as Martin in Le Chemineau by Xavier Leroux.

In 1944 he made what was the first of many radio broadcasts, as Pippo in La Mascotte. He was engaged by the Opéra-Comique in Paris, and made his debut on 1 April 1945 in The Barber of Seville (Figaro), a role he sang often in Paris and around France. He also sang Marcel in La Boheme (1946), Nicklauss in Les Contes d'Hoffmann, Frédéric in Lakmé, and Pelléas. The latter role took him on tour with the Opéra-Comique to Geneva, Vienna, Strasbourg and Baden-Baden. He later added Ange Pitou (La fille de Madame Angot), Monsieur Beaucaire and Henri de Valois (Le roi malgré lui).

Clément sang in the French premieres of The Rape of Lucretia (Mulhouse, 1948) and The Love for Three Oranges (Monte Carlo, 1952). He also took part in the first opera programme on French television in April 1946 in the Barber of Seville, and followed this with more TV appearances. For the B.B.C. Third Programme he sang in a studio performance of Le Docteur Miracle, alongside Nadine Renaux, Marjorie Westbury and Alexander Young, conducted by Stanford Robinson. He sang in the premiere of Marcel Landowski's L'Opéra de Poussière, the first 'world premiere' in the history of the Avignon Opera in 1962,

He appeared at many French provincial theatres and those in francophone countries, including the Grand Théâtre in Geneva (de Langeac in Les saltimbanques in 1963 and Duparquet in Ciboulette in 1964), having sung at the Edinburgh Festival in 1951 alongside Fanély Revoil.

He left many recordings of opéras-comiques and operettas, including Ciboulette, Véronique, Au soleil du Mexique, Le petit duc and La Vie parisienne.
