= Denise Duval =

French soprano (1921–2016)

Denise Duval (23 October 1921 – 25 January 2016) was a French soprano, best known for her performances in the works of Francis Poulenc on stage and in recital. During an international career, Duval created the roles of Thérèse in Les mamelles de Tirésias and Elle in La voix humaine and excelled in the role of Blanche de la Force in Dialogues of the Carmelites, leaving recordings of these and several other of her main roles.

== Life and career ==
Duval was born in Paris, and attended the Collège de Libourne, appearing in the play Les Plus beaux yeux du monde by Jean Sarment. Her father, a colonel, allowed her to enrol in the theatre classes at the Conservatoire de Bordeaux, where she was spotted by the director, Gaston Poulet, who got her into the vocal classes. From there she made her debut in Cavalleria rusticana at the Grand Theatre de Bordeaux in 1942, her Santuzza described by the Liberté du Sud-Ouest critic as “painful, fierce, tragic”, leading to other principal roles in Bordeaux.

In Paris, she was disappointed at her audition at the Opéra, but was soon engaged at the Folies-Bergère, and sang in the clothed revue, gaining more stage experience; she later commented "Aux Folies, j'ai tout appris!". At her second try for an operatic position, Duval was engaged for L'Aiglon (which she never sang), but made her debut at the Opéra-Comique in the title role of Madame Butterfly on 5 March 1947. The same year, she was discovered by Poulenc, rehearsing Cio-Cio-san, the composer immediately recognizing her as the artist he was seeking for his first opera Les Mamelles de Tirésias that June; she worked closely with Poulenc for the rest of his life.

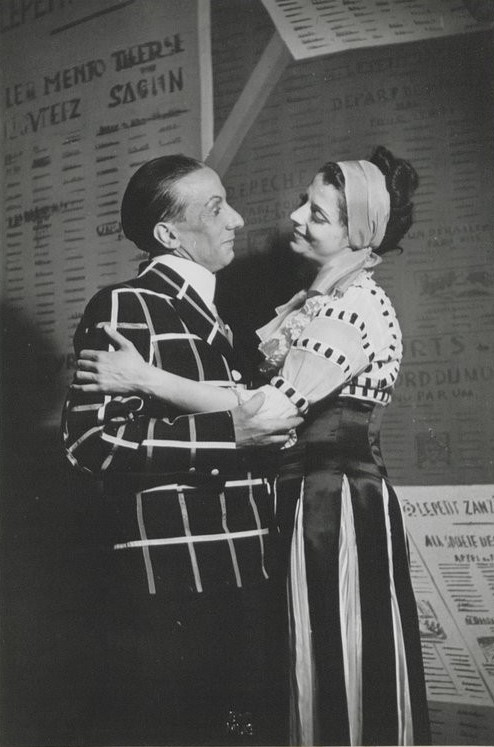
Paul Payen and Denise Duval in Les Mamelles de Tirésias, Paris, 1947

Her repertoire at the Salle Favart went on over 20 years to cover the title role in Angélique, la Périchole in le Carrosse du Saint-Sacrement, Giulietta in les Contes d’Hoffmann, Concepción in L'Heure espagnole, Alexina in Le Roi malgré lui, Tosca, la Bohème (Musette), Madame Bovary (Emma), Manon (Manon), Pelléas et Mélisande (Mélisande). She also created the roles of Thérèse in les Mamelles de Tirésias, Francesca in Le Oui des Jeunes Filles, Valentine in ll était un Petit Navire, and the title role in Dolorès. She sang Madame Fabien in the French premiere of Vol de nuit (Volo di notte) by Luigi Dallapiccola in 1960.

At the Paris Opéra, she sang Salomé in 1947 and followed this with Thaïs, Rosenn in Le Roi d'Ys, Portia in Le Marchand de Venise and Les Indes Galantes

Outside France, Duval sang in Italy (La Scala), the Edinburgh Festival, The Colon in Buenos Aires and Glyndebourne (Mélisande). At Monte Carlo her roles also included Fata Morgana in The Love for Three Oranges, Musetta in La Bohème and The Medium. Among her appearances in America was her 1961 Thaïs at the Dallas Opera, conducted by Nicola Rescigno and directed by Franco Zeffirelli. She sang La femme and Concepción in the first and third parts of a triple bill of Vol de nuit, Le Rossignol and L'Heure espagnole in Brussels.

In 1960, Poulenc wrote his La Courte Paille song cycle (poems by Maurice Carême) for Duval – or rather "for her to sing to her six-year-old son" (although she did not premiere it) – and later for her also La Dame de Monte-Carlo, in 1961.

Following incorrect administration of cortisone treatment, she retired in 1965 from performance and moved to the home her husband had built in Switzerland, while retaining some teaching at the École française de musique. She died in Bex, aged 94.

Grove describes her as a “beautiful woman with great dramatic intelligence, she was a most gifted singing actress”.

In 2003, a biography by Bruno Bérenguer, Denise Duval, was published by Symétrie.

== Roles created ==
- Thérèse in Poulenc's Les mamelles de Tirésias (3 June 1947)
- Elle in Poulenc's La voix humaine (6 February 1959)
- Blanche de la Force in Poulenc's Dialogues of the Carmelites (French version, 21 June 1957)

Other contemporary works included Der Tod des Grigori Rasputin by Nikolas Nabokov (Cologne, 1959), Les Amants captifs by Pierre Capdevielle (Bordeaux, 1960) and Le Serment by Tansman (Nice, 1963).

== Recordings ==
As well as recordings of all three Poulenc operas, these include Franz Lehár's La Veuve Joyeuse opposite Jacques Jansen for Pathé under Jules Gressier, Florent Schmitt's Psaume XLVII Op. 38 under Georges Tzipine, and Ravel's L'Heure espagnole (Concepción) with Opéra-Comique forces under André Cluytens.

In 2009, a 1963 recording of Pelléas et Mélisande from Glyndebourne under Vittorio Gui brought back Duval's performance of Mélisande. From French radio broadcasts, recordings of Phryné by Saint-Saens in 1960 and Geneviève de Brabant by Offenbach in 1956 (both title roles) have been issued, while her Périchole of 1950 has yet to be released.

A DVD entitled Francis Poulenc & Friends, of archive French television broadcasts, includes operatic excerpts and two melodies sung by Duval with Poulenc accompanying, in 1959.

In 1970, Dominique Delouche filmed Duval in the role of Elle in 'playback' to her 1960 audio recording of La Voix humaine; in 1998, Duval gave a master class on the role on the stage of the Opéra-Comique with Sophie Fournier accompanied by Alexandre Tharaud at the piano.

== Bibliography ==
- Warrack, John and West, Ewan (1992), The Oxford Dictionary of Opera, 782 pages, ISBN 0-19-869164-5
