= Michel Roux (baritone) =

French opera singer

- Michel Roux in Carmen, Teatro alla Scala, Milan, 1954-1955
- Born: September 1, 1924
- Died: February 4, 1998 (aged 73)

Michel Roux (1 September 1924, in Angoulême – 4 February 1998, in Paris) was a French baritone, an established principal at the Paris Opéra who also enjoyed an international career.

== Life and career ==
Roux was the son of a printer for medicinal packaging and worked with his father. As a rugby player, he often sang at post-match meals. His father encouraged him to take vocal training, which he began after having broken an arm during a match. Roux studied at the Bordeaux Conservatoire and in Paris, making his operatic debut on 5 October 1949 in Lakmé at the Opéra-Comique, going on to sing in Les Contes d'Hoffmann, Manon and Pelléas and Mélisande, creating l'Aveugle in Madame Bovary in 1951, and remaining a principal singer there until 1955.

His debut at La Scala came in 1953 as Golaud, a role that became central to his repertory. From 1956 to 1970 Roux sang annually at Glyndebourne, making his debut as Count Almaviva in Le Nozze di Figaro. His American debut was at the Lyric Opera of Chicago in 1959; he also appeared at the Vienna Staatsoper and the Deutsche Oper in Berlin, as well as in Amsterdam, Brussels, and Lisbon.

Roux was known as an intelligent singer and a vivid stage actor. In later life he taught at the École Normale de Musique de Paris. In 1983 he took the title role in a revival of Christiné's Phi-Phi at the Théâtre des Bouffes Parisiens.

His many recordings include: Raimbaud (Le Comte Ory), Escamillo (Carmen), Golaud (Pelléas et Mélisande), Mizgir (The Snow Maiden), Gondremarck (La Vie parisienne), Calchas (La belle Hélène), and Mephistophélès (La damnation de Faust).
