= Les Indes galantes =

Opera-ballet by Jean-Philippe Rameau

- Opera by Jean-Philippe Rameau
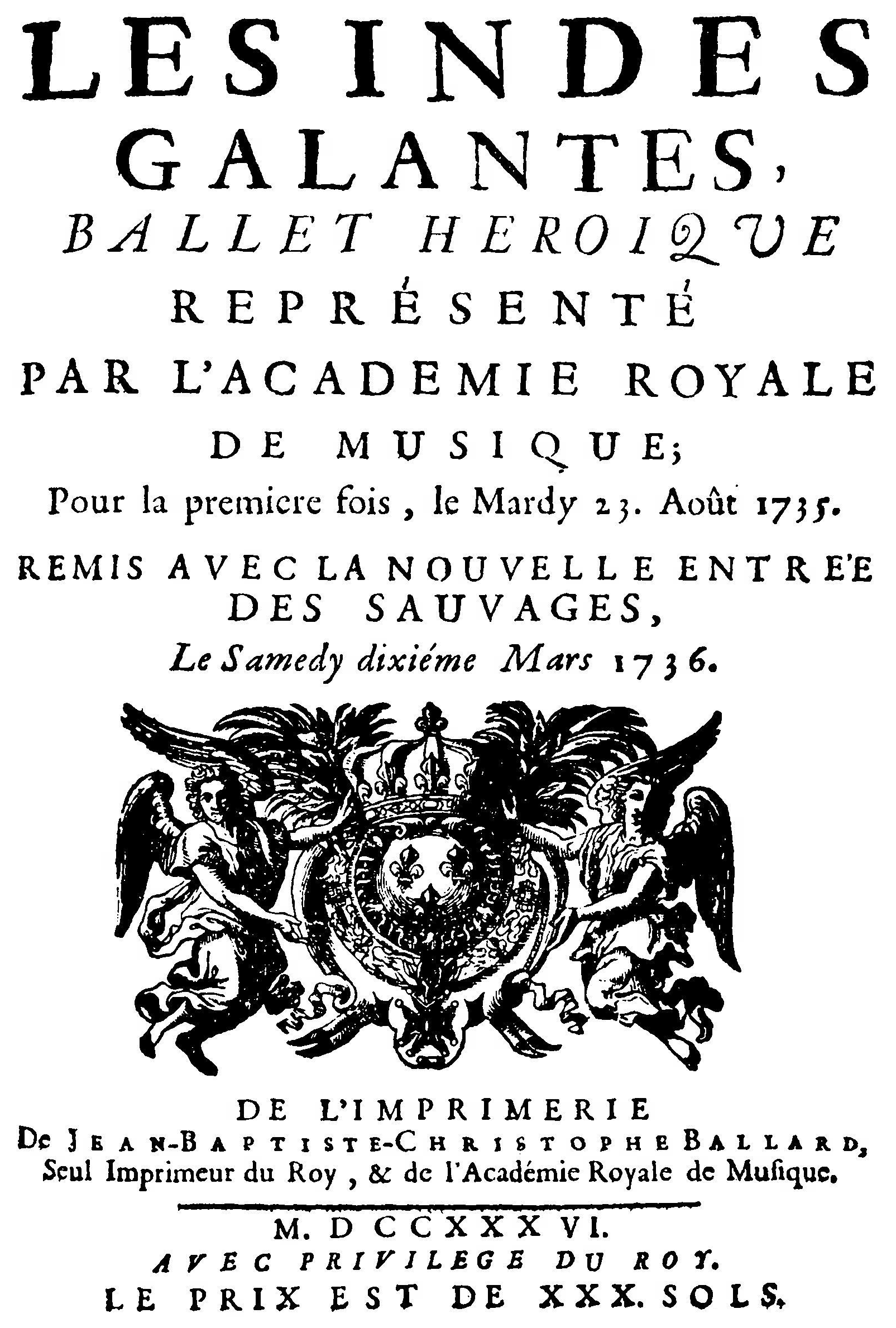
- Title page of the 1736 libretto
- Librettist: Louis Fuzelier
- Language: French
- Premiere: 23 August 1735; Theatre in the Palais-Royal, Paris

Les Indes galantes (The Amorous Indies) is a ballet héroïque, a type of French Baroque opera-ballet, by Jean-Philippe Rameau with a libretto by Louis Fuzelier. In its final form it comprised an allegorical prologue and four entrées, or acts, each set in an exotic place, the whole being unified around the theme of love. The work dates from 1735 except for the last entrée, which was added the following year. In 1761, however, Rameau dropped the relatively short and mildly contrasted third entrée so as to leave what is now considered the work's definitive form: Prologue; Le turc généreux (The Generous Turk); Les incas du Pérou (The Incas of Peru); and Les sauvages (The Savages of North America). The dropped entrée was Les fleurs (The Flowers of Persia). Famous pieces from Les Indes galantes include the Dance of the Peace Pipe and the Chaconne, both from The Savages of North America.

== Premiere ==
The premiere, including only the prologue and the first two entrées, was staged by the Académie Royale de Musique (today's Paris Opera) at its Theatre in the Palais-Royal on 23 August 1735. The leading artists of the company performed: dancers Marie Sallé and Louis Dupré and the singers Marie Antier, Marie Pélissier, Mlle Errémans, Mlle Petitpas, Denis-François Tribou, Pierre Jélyotte and Claude-Louis-Dominique Chassé de Chinais. Michel Blondy provided the choreography.

== Background ==
In 1725, French settlers in Illinois sent Chief Agapit Chicagou of the Mitchigamea and five other chiefs to Paris. On 25 November 1725, they met with King Louis XV. Chicagou had a letter read pledging allegiance to the crown. They later danced three kinds of dances in the Théâtre-Italien, inspiring Rameau to compose his rondeau Les Sauvages.

In a preface to the printed libretto, Louis Fuzelier explains that the first entrée, "Le Turc généreux," "is based on an illustrious character—Grand Vizier Topal Osman Pasha, who was so well known for his extreme generosity. His story can be read in the Mercure de France from January 1734." The story of Osman's generosity "was apparently based on a story published in the Mercure de Suisse in September 1734 concerning a Marseillais merchant, Vincent Arniaud, who saved a young Ottoman notable from slavery in Malta, and the unstinting gratitude and generosity returned by this young man, who later became Grand Vizier Topal Osman Pasha."

== Performance history ==
The premiere met with a lukewarm reception from the audience and, at the third performance, a new entrée was added under the title Les Fleurs. However, this caused further discontent because it showed the hero disguised as a woman, which was viewed either as an absurdity or as an indecency. As a result, it was revised for the first time and this version was staged on 11 September. Notwithstanding these initial problems, the first run went on for twenty-eight performances between 23 August and 25 October, when, however, only 281 livres were grossed, the lowest amount ever collected at the box office by Les Indes galantes.

Nevertheless, when it was mounted again on 10 (or 11) March 1736, a 'prodigious' audience flocked to the theatre. The entrée des Fleurs was "replaced with a version in which the plot and all the music except the divertissement was new", and a fourth entrée, Les Sauvages, was added, in which Rameau reused the famous air des Sauvages he had composed in 1725 on the occasion of the American Indian chiefs' visit and later included in the Nouvelles Suites de pièces de clavecin (1728).

Now in something approaching a definitive form, the opera enjoyed six performances in March and was then mounted again as of 27 December. Further revivals were held in 1743–1744, 1751 and 1761 for a combined total of 185 billings. The work was also performed in Lyon on 23 November 1741, at the theatre of the Jeu de Paume de la Raquette Royale, and again in 1749/1750, at the initiative of Rameau's brother-in-law, Jean-Philippe Mangot. Furthermore, the prologue and individual entrées were often revived separately and given within the composite operatic programs called 'fragments' or 'spectacles coupés' (cut up representations) that: "were almost constant fare at the Palais-Royal in the second half of the eighteenth century". The prologue, Les Incas and Les Sauvages were last given respectively in 1771 (starring Rosalie Levasseur, Gluck's future favourite soprano, in the role of Hebé), 1772 and 1773 (also starring Levasseur as Zima). Thenceforth Les Indes galantes was dropped from the Opéra's repertoire, after having seen almost every artiste of the company in the previous forty years take part in its complete or partial performances.

In the twentieth century the Opéra-Comique presented the first version of the Entrée des Fleurs, with a new orchestration by Paul Dukas, on 30 May 1925, in a production conducted by Maurice Frigara, with Yvonne Brothier as Zaïre, Antoinette Reville as Fatima, Miguel Villabella as Tacmas and Emile Rousseau as Ali.

Finally, Les Indes galantes was revived by the Opéra itself, at the Palais Garnier, with the Dukas orchestration supplemented for the other entrées by Henri Busser, on 18 June 1952: the production, managed by the Opéra's own director, Maurice Lehmann and conducted by Louis Fourestier, was notable for the lavishness of its staging and enjoyed as many as 236 performances by 29 September 1961. The sets were by André Arbus and Jacques Dupont (1909–1978) (prologue and finale), Georges Wakhevitch (first entrée), Jean Carzou (second entrée), Henri Raymond Fost (1905–1970) and Maurice Moulène (third entrée) and Roger Chapelain-Midy (fourth entrée); the choreography was provided by Albert Aveline (1883–1968) (first entrée), Serge Lifar (second and fourth entrées) and Harald Lander (third entrée). In the 1st Entrée ("The Gracious Turk") Jacqueline Brumaire sang Emilie, Jean Giraudeau was Valère and Hugo Santana was Osman; the dancers were Mlle Bourgeois and M Legrand. In the 2nd Entrée ("The Incas of Peru") Marisa Ferrer was Phani, Georges Noré was don Carlos, and René Bianco was Huascar, while Serge Lifar danced alongside Vyroubova and Bozzoni. The 3rd Entrée ("The Flowers") had Janine Micheau as Fatima, side by side with Denise Duval as Zaïre. Giraudeau was Tacmas and Jacques Jansen, the famous Pelléas, was Ali, with Mlle Bardin dancing as the Rose, Mlle Dayde as the Butterfly, Ritz as Zéphir and Renault as a Persian. The 4th Entrée ("The Savages of America") had Mme Géori Boué, as Zima, with José Luccioni as Adario, Raoul Jobin as Damon and Roger Bourdin as don Alvar. The dancing for this act was executed by Mlles Darsonval, Lafon and Guillot and Messieurs Kalioujny and Efimoff.

In the United Kingdom, it received its Proms premiere on 27 August 1987, with selections from the opera performed by the Amsterdam Baroque Orchestra conducted by Ton Koopman.

On 25 July 2025 an orchestral suite from the work was performed by the Scottish Chamber Orchestra, with Maxim Emelyanychev, at the BBC Proms. The suite was broadcast by BBC Four on 12 September 2025 .

== Roles ==
Role	Voice type	Premiere cast, 23 August 1735 (Conductor: – )
Prologue
Hébé	soprano	Mlle Eremans (also spelled Erremans)
L' Amour	soprano en travesti	Mlle Petitpas
Bellone	baritone en travesti	Cuignier
Entrée I
Emilie	soprano	Marie Pélissier
Valère	haute-contre	Pierre Jélyotte
Osman	baritone	Jean Dun "fils"
Entrée II
Phani	soprano	Marie Antier
Don Carlos	haute-contre	Pierre Jélyotte
Huascar	bass	Claude-Louis-Dominique Chassé de Chinais
Entrée III (first version: August/September 1735)
Fatime	soprano	Mlle Petitpas
Zaïre	soprano	Mlle Eremans
Tacmas	haute-contre	Denis-François Tribou
Ali	baritone	Person
Entrée III (second version: 10 March 1736)
Fatime	soprano	Mlle Petitpas
Atalide	soprano	Mlle Eremans
Tacmas	haute-contre	Denis-François Tribou
Roxane	soprano	Mlle Bourbonnais
Entrée IV (10 March 1736)
Zima	soprano	Marie Pélissier
Adario	tenor (taille)	Louis-Antoine Cuvillier (or Cuvilier or Cuvelier)
Damon	haute-contre	Pierre Jélyotte
Don Alvar	bass	Jean Dun "fils"

== Synopsis ==
=== Prologue ===
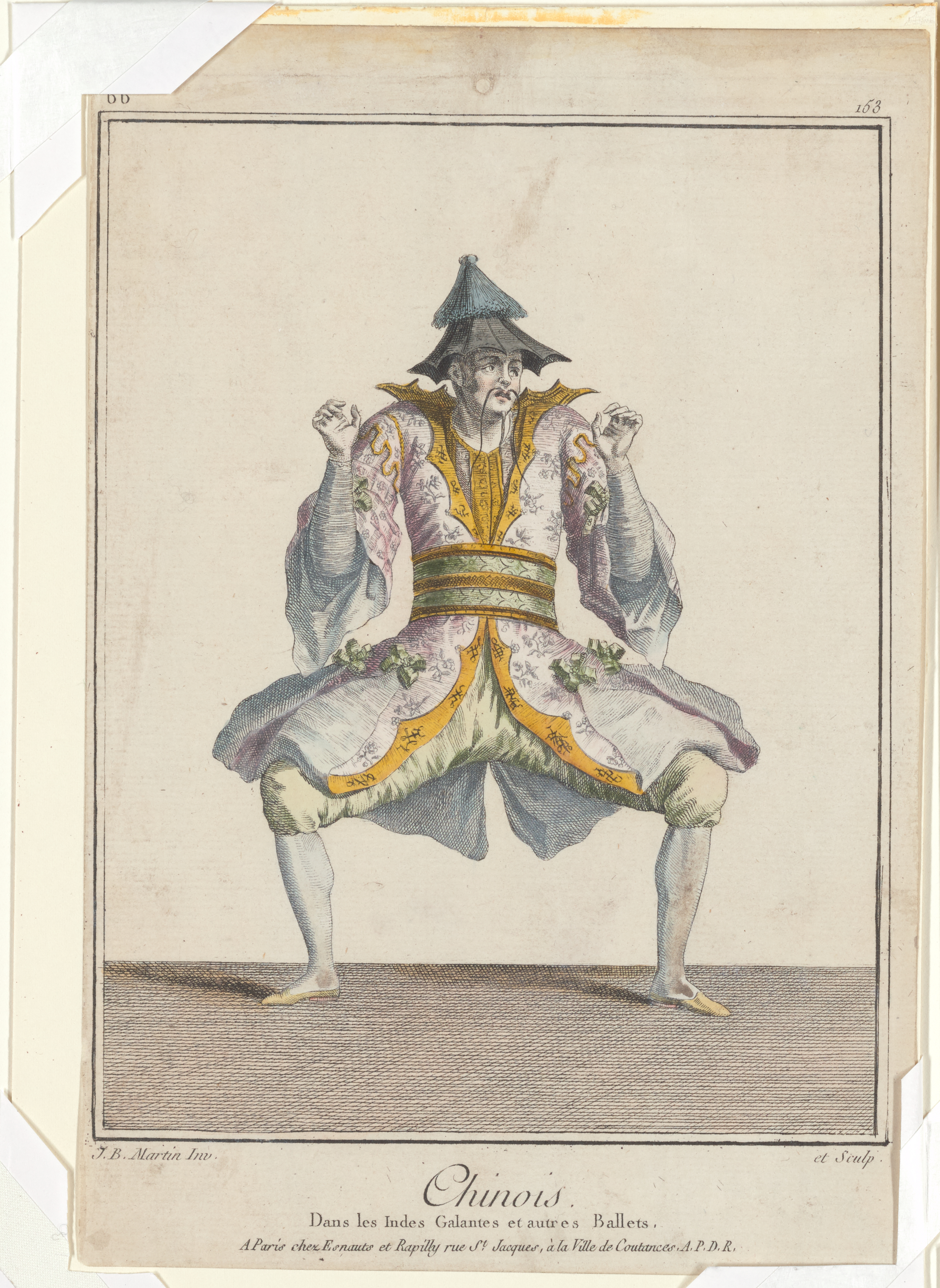

Scene: The palace of Hebe in the background and her gardens in the wings

Hebe, goddess of youth, summons her followers to take part in a festival (Air: Vous, qui d'Hébé suivez les lois). Young French, Spanish, Italians and Poles rush to celebrate with a series of dances, including a musette. The ballet is interrupted by the noise of drums and trumpets. It is Bellona, goddess of war, who arrives on the stage accompanied by warriors bearing flags. Bellona calls on the youths to seek out military glory (Air and chorus: La Gloire vous appelle). Hebe prays to Cupid (L'Amour) to use his power to hold them back. Cupid descends on a cloud with his followers. He decides to abandon Europe in favour of the "Indies", where love is more welcome.

=== Entrée I – Le turc généreux (The Generous Turk) ===
Scene: The gardens of Osman Pasha bordering the sea

Osman Pasha is in love with his slave, the young Émilie, but she rejects him, telling him she was about to be married when a group of brigands abducted her. Osman urges her to give up hope that her fiancé is still alive (Air: Il faut que l'amour s'envole) but Émilie refuses to believe this is true. The sky turns dark as a storm brews; Émilie sees the violent weather as an image of her despair (Air: Vaste empire des mers). A chorus of shipwrecked sailors is heard (Chorus: Ciel! de plus d'une mort). Émilie laments that they too will be taken captive. She recognises one of the sailors as her fiancé Valère. Their joy at their reunion is tempered by sadness at the thought they are both slaves now. Osman enters and is furious to see the couple embracing. However, unexpectedly, he announces he will free them. He too has recognised Valère, who was once his master but magnanimously freed him. Osman loads Valère's surviving ships with gifts and the couple praise his generosity. They call on the winds to blow them back to France (Duet and chorus: Volez, Zéphyrs). The act ends with celebratory dances as Valère and Émilie prepare to set sail.

=== Entrée II – Les incas du Pérou (The Incas of Peru) ===
Scene: a desert in Peru with a volcano in the background

Carlos, a Spanish officer, is in love with the Inca princess Phani. He urges her to escape with him but she fears the anger of the Incas, who are preparing to celebrate the Festival of the Sun. Nevertheless, she is prepared to marry him (Air: Viens, Hymen). The Inca priest Huascar is also in love with Phani but suspects he has a rival and decides to resort to subterfuge. Huascar leads the ceremony of the adoration of the Sun, which is interrupted by a sudden earthquake. Huascar declares this means the gods want Phani to choose him as her husband. Carlos enters and tells Phani the earthquake was a trick, artificially created by Huascar. Carlos and Phani sing of their love while Huascar swears revenge (Trio: Pour jamais). Huascar provokes an eruption of the volcano and is crushed by its burning rocks.

=== Entrée III – Les fleurs (The Flowers) ===
- First version.

Scene: The gardens of Ali's palace
Prince Tacmas is in love with Zaïre, a slave belonging to his favourite Ali, even though he has a slave girl of his own, Fatime. Tacmas appears at Ali's palace disguised as a merchant woman so he can slip into the harem unnoticed and test Zaïre's feelings for him. Zaïre enters and laments that she is unhappily in love (Air: Amour, Amour, quand du destin j'éprouve la rigueur). Tacmas overhears her and is determined to find out the name of his rival. Fatime now enters, disguised as a Polish slave, and Tacmas believes he has found Zaïre's secret lover. Enraged, he casts off his disguise and is about to stab Fatime when she too reveals her true identity. It turns out that Zaïre has been in love with Tacmas all along just as Fatime has been in love with Ali. The two couples rejoice in this happy resolution (Quartet: Tendre amour) and the act ends with the Persians celebrating the Festival of Flowers.

- Second Version.

Sultana Fatime suspects her husband Tacmas of cheating on her with Atalide; she therefore disguises herself as a slave, succeeding in gaining Atalide's confidence and eventually recognises her suspicions are groundless. The happy couple take part in the Festival of Flowers.

=== Entrée IV – Les sauvages (The Savages) ===
Scene: The stage shows a grove in a forest in America, on the borders of the French and Spanish colonies, where the ceremony of the Peace Pipe is about to be celebrated

Adario, a Native American, is in love with Zima, daughter of a native chief, but he fears the rivalry of the Spaniard Don Alvar and the Frenchman Damon (Air: Rivaux des mes exploits, rivaux des mes amours). The Europeans plead with Zima for her love, but she says Damon is too fickle and Alvar is too jealous; she prefers the natural love shown by Adario (Air: Sur nos bords l'amour vole) and the couple vow to marry (Duet: Hymen, viens nous unir d'une chaîne éternelle). The act ends with the Europeans joining the natives in the ceremony of peace (Chorus: Forêts paisibles).

== Recordings of the complete work ==
- 1973 – Rachel Yakar, Janine Micheau, Sonia Nigoghossian, Bruce Brewer, Jean-Christophe Benoît, chorus and orchestra conducted by Jean-Claude Malgoire, on three LPs, CBS 77365; note: nobody sings Amour in the Prologue
- 1974 – Gerda Hartman, Jennifer Smith (sopranos); Louis Devos, John Elwes (tenors); Philippe Huttenlocher (baritone). Ensemble Vocal à Coeur-Joie de Valence, Orchestre Paillard, conducted by Jean-François Paillard, on Erato 4509-95310-2
- 1991 – Miriam Ruggeri (soprano), Bernard Deletré (bass), Howard Crook (tenor), Nicolas Rivenq (baritone), Noémi Rime (soprano), Sandrine Piau (soprano), Jean-Paul Fouchécourt (tenor), Jérôme Correas (baritone), Isabelle Poulenard (soprano), Claron McFadden (soprano). The Ensemble of Les Arts Florissants conducted by William Christie, duration 3 hours 13 mins, Harmonia Mundi 901367
- 1994 – Lucy van Dael (leader), Orchestra of the Eighteenth Century, on period instruments, conducted by Frans Brüggen, on Philips Digital Classics 438 946-2
- 2003, filmed in Paris – Nathan Berg, Valérie Gabail, Nicolas Cavallier, Patricia Petibon, Paul Agnew, Jaël Azzaretti, Danielle de Niese, Anna Maria Panzarella, Nicolas Rivenq. The Ensemble of Les Arts Florissants conducted by William Christie, released on 2 DVDs, BBC Opus Arte Catalog 923
- 2013, live in Vienna – Valérie Gabail, Stéphanie Révidat, Reinoud Van Mechelen, François-Nicolas Geslot, Aimery Lefèvre, Sydney Fierro, Chorus and Orchestra of La Simphonie du Marais, conducted by Hugo Reyne, label: Musiques à la Charbotterie, on 3 CDs
- 2014, filmed in February at the Grand Théâtre de Bordeaux – Amel Brahim Djelloul, Benoît Arnould, Olivera Topalovic, Judith van Wanroij, Les Talens Lyriques, conducted by Christophe Rousset, released on 2 DVDs by Alpha; note: uses the 1736 score for Les fleurs
- 2016, filmed in July at the Prinzregententheater in Munich – Benoit, Lisette Oropesa, Anna Prohaska, Quintans; Auvity, Moore, Vidal; Jurić, Lis, Nazmi; conducted by Ivor Bolton, live-streamed by Bavarian State Opera
- 2019 – Chantal Santon-Jeffery, Katherine Watson, Howard Crook, Véronique Gens, Reinoud van Mechelen, Jean-Sébastien Bou, Thomas Dolié, Jérôme Correas. Purcell Choir and Orfeo Orchestra, conducted by György Vashegyi. 1761 version (does not include Les fleurs) on 2 CDs. Record label: Glossa, duration 123'41".
- 2019 – Clément Cogitore (director), Bintou Dembélé (choreographer) and Leonardo García Alarcón (conductor), with the Cappella Mediterranea, Chœur de chambre de Namur, the Compagnie Rualité, the La Maîtrise des Hauts-de-Seine and Opéra National de Paris children's choir.
- Camille Maurane (on Philips) and Gérard Souzay (on Decca) recorded Huascar's Invocation au Soleil from the Peruvian Entrée.
