= Michel Dens =

French opera singer

Michel Dens (22 June 1911 in Roubaix – 19 December 2000 in Paris) was a French baritone, particularly associated with the French repertory, both opera and operetta.

Born Maurice Marcel, the son of a journalist, he studied at the Academy of Music in Roubaix. He made his debut at the Opéra de Lille, as Wagner in Gounod's Faust, in 1934, and remained there as a member until 1936. Thereafter he sang at the Opera Houses of Bordeaux, Grenoble, Toulouse and Marseille. In 1943, he was heard at the Monte Carlo Opera as Escamillo, Valentin, and the Count in Le nozze di Figaro.

After the Second World War, he began a very successful career at the Opéra-Comique and the Palais Garnier in Paris. His roles at the Opéra-Comique included; Figaro, Lescaut, Zurga, Frédéric, Ourrias, Dapertutto, Alfio, Marcello, Scarpia, et al., he took part there in the creation of Emmanuel Bondeville's Madame Bovary, on 1 June 1951.

His debut role at the Opéra in 1947 was in the title role of Rigoletto, he also sang there as Enrico in Lucia di Lammermoor, Hérode in Hérodiade, Athanaël in Thais, et al. He appeared with success at the Aix-en-Provence Festival and at most of the great Opera Houses of France.

He also appeared in Belgium, Switzerland, Canada, and North Africa.

He enjoyed a remarkably long and successful career, singing in opera as late as 1979, and also attaining magnificent success in French and Viennese operettas, notably in Lehár's The Land of Smiles and The Merry Widow. He also sang in works by Louis Varney, Robert Planquette, Charles Lecocq, André Messager, and others. As late as 1992, he gave concerts in Paris and Marseille. He was made a Chevalier de la Légion d'honneur.

Dens sang an estimated 10,000 performances during his long career.

== Sources ==
- Operissimo.com
