= François Le Roux =

French baritone (born 1955)

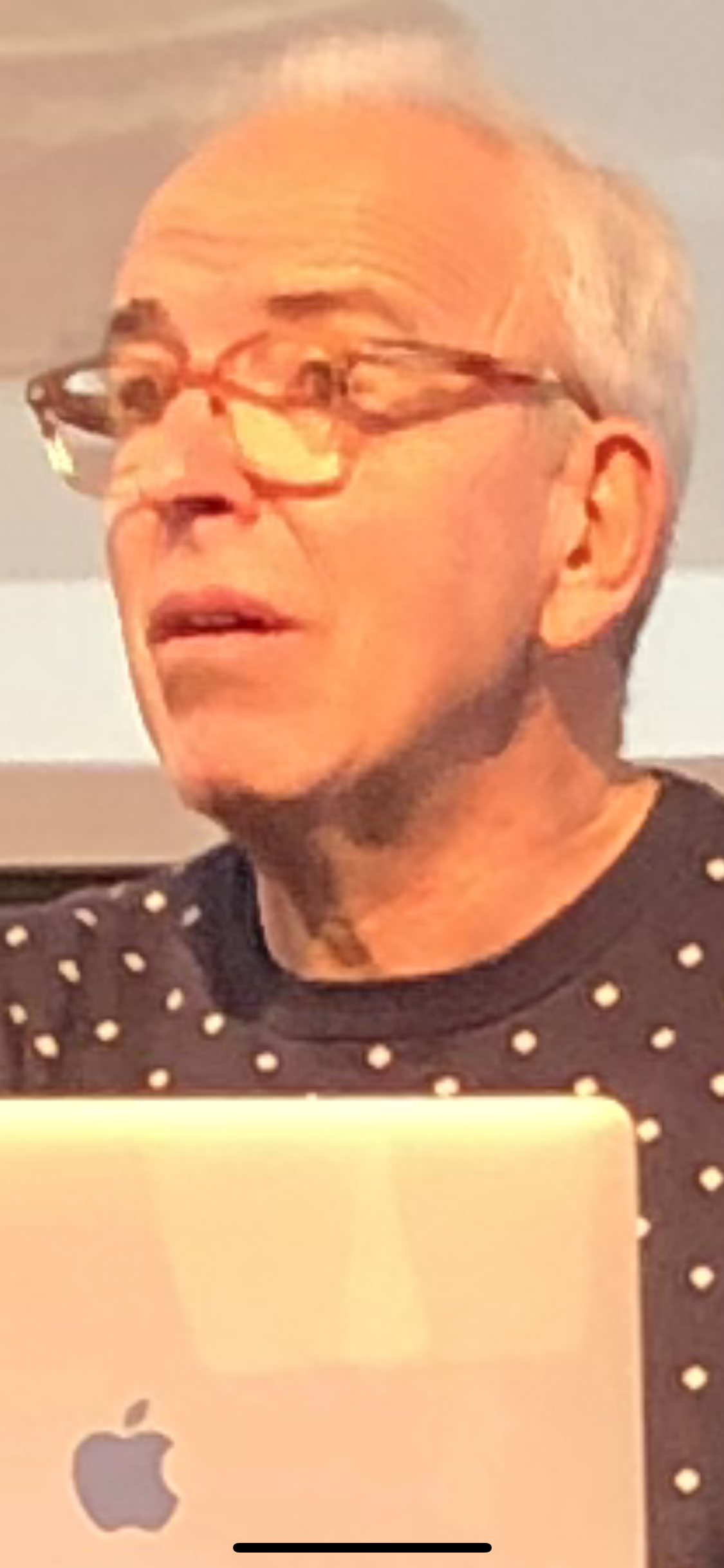
François Le Roux

François Le Roux (born 30 October 1955) is a French baritone. Le Roux began vocal studies at 19 with François Loup, winning prizes in Barcelona and Rio de Janeiro. He was a member of the Lyon Opera Company from 1980 to 1985, before appearing in many international houses, making his Paris Opéra debut in 1988 as Valentin in Gounod's Faust. He is most renowned for his portrayal of Pelléas in Debussy's opera, first singing the role in 1985 and being hailed by critics as "the greatest Pelléas of his generation". Since 1998 he has also sung Golaud in the same opera to similar acclaim. It was as Golaud he sang in the centenary performance at the Opéra-Comique, and also in the Russian national premiere. He voiced Gaston, the villainous hunter in the European French dub of Disney's "Beauty and the Beast.

As well as a vast operatic repertory, he has released many recitals of French song, which have earned him the distinction as Gérard Souzay's natural successor. He is considered as "the great ambassador of French melody"». His book, Le chant intime, on the interpretation of French song, won the 2004 René Dumesnil Award by the French National Académie des Beaux Arts.

He has been awarded the grade of "Chevalier" in the French National Order of Les Arts et Lettres in 1996, and chosen as "Musical Personality of the year 1997" by the French Critics Union.
