= Pierre Mollet =

Canadian operatic baritone

Pierre Mollet (23 March 1920, Neuchâtel - 27 October 2007) was a Canadian operatic baritone. He was born in Switzerland. He became a naturalized Canadian citizen in 1974, and in 1979, he married the Canadian pianist Suzanne Blondin.

Mollet was trained at the Lausanne Conservatory, where he was a pupil of Charles Panzéra. In 1946, he won second prize at the Geneva International Music Competition. The following year, he began studying music interpretation with Nadia Boulanger in Paris, France, and became highly active as a concert soloist with orchestras in the city during the late 1940s and 1950s. From 1948 to 1962, he traveled throughout Northern Africa and France performing in concerts sponsored by Jeunesses Musicales International. He also sang in concerts at several notable music festivals, including the Strasbourg Festival and the Aix-en-Provence Festival.

Mollet made his professional opera debut in 1952, portraying Pelléas in Claude Debussy's Pelléas et Mélisande at the Opéra-Comique, recording the part later that year with conductor Ernest Ansermet. He went on to sing that role for performances in cities throughout Europe and South America. He created the role of Eraste in Frank Martin's opera Monsieur de Pourceaugnac; other significant roles include Albert in Massenet's Werther and Mercutio in Gounod's Roméo et Juliette.
