= Ciboulette =

French opérette

Hahn in 1906

Ciboulette (French pronunciation: [sibulɛt]) is a French opérette in three acts, music by Reynaldo Hahn, libretto by Robert de Flers and Francis de Croisset, first performed at the Théâtre des Variétés, in Paris, on 7 April 1923. One of the most elegant and refined compositions of Hahn, it is considered one of the last masterpieces of French operetta.

== Principal roles ==
Role	Voice type	Premiere cast, 7 April 1923 (Conductor: Paul Letombe)
Ciboulette	soprano	Edmée Favart
Zénobie	soprano	Jeanne Pierrat
Madame Pingret	bass-baritone	Madeleine Guitty
Madame Grenu	soprano	Jeanne Loury
Duparquet	baritone	Jean Périer
Antonin	tenor	Henry Defreyn
Roger	baritone	Jean Calain
Olivier Métra	baritone	René Koval
Comtesse de Castiglione	soprano	Luce Fabiole
Chorus: Officers, courtesans, market workers, farmers, eight fiancés, Olivier Métra's guests

== Synopsis ==
The action takes place in Paris, in 1867.

Duparquet is the controller of Les Halles, and plays matchmaker between the young farm-girl Ciboulette and Antonin, a young spoiled aristocrat. After many adventures, the lovers are united.

Act I: We are in a room in the Smoking Dog Tavern (Au Chien Qui Fume) at Les Halles. Antonin enters with Zenobie, who is about to dump him in favour of the dashing army captain Roger. Old Duparquet who is something of a poet, is observing the happy young couples full of the joy of spring. He falls into a maudlin mood, hinting at some deep sadness he experienced as a young man. Antonin returns to find that Zenobie has been flirting with Roger and realizes he must give her up so announces to all the room that Roger has won Zenobie’s heart and he will give her up to him… provided Roger also accepts all the bills he, Antonin, has racked up on Zenobie's behalf – dressmakers, dentists, jewellery, furs. Duparquet, impressed by Antonin’s pluck, offers his friendship and they head off to drown their sorrows. Now it is dawn and the farmers, gardeners and traders are starting to unload their carts and set up their stalls in the centre of Les Halles market. Ciboulette joins them, having just heard a rather strange prediction from the fortune teller Old Mother Pingret. Ciboulette will apparently marry a man who she will find under a cabbage but only after she encounters a woman who turns white instantly, and after she receives a notice of a death, hidden inside a tambourine. Ciboulette puts that strange prophesy aside when she is told that the buyer lined up for her cart of vegetables has purchased from another source because Ciboulette was just a few minutes late for the appointment, leaving her with 500 francs of unsold vegetables. Duparquet who has observed this castigates the fickle buyer but has nothing to offer Ciboulette so Antonin, still smarting from his treatment by Zenobie offers Cibouolette 500 francs “as a joint gift from him and Duparquet” to cover her losses. She accepts and offers him thanks. Antonin, exhausted from the previous night’s activity, climbs into an empty vegetable cart, crawls under the straw, and falls asleep. As dawn breaks, Duparquet comments on the young bucks and courtesans staggering home after a night of revelry, while the stallholders set out their produce. Meanwhile Ciboulette asks her friends to load up her cart with her unsold produce for she has ducks and cows and lambs to tend back home. Little does she know that under the straw she is also taking home with her a hungover and sleeping Antonin.

Act II: We are back in Ciboulette's home village of Aubervilliers, just outside Paris. While Ciboulette was away at Les Halles, her aunt has been lining up fiancés for her – eight of them, no less! The vivacious Ciboulette had at some point mentioned marriage to each of them, and so her aunt has arranged for them all to gather at the village church and her uncle will demand that as soon as she arrives home she will go to the church and pick one to be her husband, for today is her 21st birthday and if she doesn’t get married soon she’ll dishonour the family. She arrives rather late for she and Duparquet whom she has brought back to the village took a few detours to gather lilacs and refresh themselves with cider. Ciboulette is distressed for she confesses to Duparquet that she loves none of them, and at just this moment Antonin groggily sticks his head out from the vegetable baskets in the back of her cart, shaking off the cabbage leaves. There is just enough time for Antonin to explain how he ended up in her cart when a messenger arrives with a letter for her uncle and aunt, saying that the newly appointed farm steward has delayed his arrival by one week. This news gives Duparquet an idea of how to turn Antonin from being a "cuckold at two in the morning into a bridegroom by the end of the day" but he keeps his true intention to himself, only asking Antonin to pretend to be the new Steward and Ciboulette to pretend to be in love with him. Antonin and Ciboulette play their parts well and the disappointed fiancés are encouraged by Duparquet to go off with him to enjoy a few bottles of wine, but just as Ciboulette and Antonin are left alone who should arrive but Captain Roger, whose Company has been assigned exercises near this very village. Worse, Roger has brought his new girlfriend Zenobie with him. To prevent Antonin seeing the two of them she bundles him down to the cellar and attends to the visitors but in no time Zenobie has insulted Ciboulette who in reply throws a cup of flour over Zenobie and with Roger threatening to have the inn closed down, the company heads back to their Paris barracks. But when Ciboulette explains to Antonin what just happened his jealousy boils up, they argue and Antonin leaves in pursuit of Zenobie. Duparquet enters to find Ciboulette in tears for she thinks she has fallen in love with Antonin and Duparquet reveals to her that he loved once – a girl called Mimi and though they had falling-outs and infidelities they still loved each other, right up until the time Mimi died. Recovering his composure he tells Ciboulette that she will win Antonin and cure him of his infatuation with Zenobie.

Act III: We are back in Paris a few weeks later. Ciboulette has swapped her farm girl's clothes for the costume of a Spanish singer for Duparquet has concocted a plan with the help of his friend, the "Waltz King" Olivier Metra. That evening Metra is hosting a soirée for the nobility in which he will introduce the sensational Conchita Ciboulero. With a little deft footwork Duparquet and Metra arrange for a tambourine to be delivered to Ciboulette/Conchita containing the a note Antonin has written. Antonin has cured himself of his infatuation with Zenobia, only to hear that Ciboulette (whom he now realizes he loves) has disappeared, and has decided that on the morrow he will take his own life. The third of the old fortune teller’s prophesies have come true. First Antonin emerged from under a pile of cabbages, then Zenobie turned white when Ciboulette threw a cup of flower over her and finally she has received a note announcing a death, delivered to her in a tambourine. And now she reveals who she is to Antonin; the two lovers are reunited and fall into each others’ arms.

== Discography ==
- Ciboulette (abridged) - Géori Boué, Roger Bourdin, Raymond Amadé - Orchestre de la Société des Concerts du Conservatoire, Marcel Cariven - Pathé (1952).
- Ciboulette (abridged) - Andrée Grandjean, Willy Clément, Michel Hamel, Françoise Ogéas - Chorus and Orchestra of the Théâtre des Champs-Élysées, Paul Bonneau - Ducretet-Thomson (1955).
- Ciboulette - Mady Mesplé, José van Dam, Nicolai Gedda, Colette Alliot-Lugaz - Ensemble Choral Jean Laforge, Orchestre Philarmonique de Monte-Carlo, Cyril Diederich - EMI (1983).
- Ciboulette (DVD) - Julie Fuchs, Jean-François Lapointe, Julien Behr, Guillemette Laurens, Accentus, l'Orchestre Symphonique de l'Opéra de Toulon, Laurence Equilbey - framusica (recorded at the Opéra-Comique, Paris, in February 2013)

== Adaptations ==
French director Claude Autant-Lara made the operetta into the film Ciboulette in 1933.

== Sources ==
- Le guide de l'opéra, R. Mancini & J.J. Rouvereux, (Fayard, 1986) ISBN 2-213-01563-5
