= Jean Giraudeau =

French opera singer (1916–1995)

- Born: 1 July 1916; Toulon
- Died: 7 February 1995 (aged 78); Toulon

Jean Giraudeau (1 July 1916 – 7 February 1995) was a French tenor, and later theatre director, particularly associated with the Opéra-Comique in Paris, and described in Grove as having a “lyrical voice” as well as being “a superb character actor”. He left a wide selection of recordings from both his operatic and concert repertoire, and created roles in several contemporary operas.

== Life and career ==
Giraudeau's parents were both teachers at the conservatoire in Toulon. After obtaining a degree in law, Giraudeau studied music, winning prizes in song, opera and cello in 1941. His stage debut was at the Opéra de Montpellier in 1942 (Wilhelm Meister) in Mignon. He took part in the premiere of Martine by Henri Rabaud at the Strasbourg Opera House before joining the main opera companies in Paris.

Having sung in a pioneering BBC broadcast of Les Troyens recorded in May and June 1947, Giraudeau made his debut at the Opéra-Comique on 23 July that year as Nadir in Les pêcheurs de perles, going on to create roles in Il était un petit navire by Germaine Tailleferre in 1951 (Valentin) and in Marion, ou la Belle au tricorne by Pierre Wissmer in 1951 (Fabrice) at that theatre.

At the Opéra-Comique Giraudeau also sang in Madame Bovary by Emmanuel Bondeville (Charles Bovary), Blaise le savetier by Philidor (Blaise), Ariane à Naxos (Bacchus), Lakmé (Gérald), Le Barbier de Séville (Almaviva), Così fan tutte (Ferrando), Les Indes galantes (Valère), Manon (Des Grieux), Madama Butterfly (Pinkerton) Les Mamelles de Tirésias (le Mari) and L'Heure espagnole (Gonzalve).

At the Paris Opera he made his first appearance two weeks after his Salle Favart debut playing Tamino in La Flûte enchantée, following this with David in Die Meistersinger, Alfredo in La Traviata, and created Nicador in Bolivar, and sang the Chevalier de la Force in the French premiere of Dialogues des carmélites. Appearances outside France included Lensky in Eugene Onegin at the Bolshoy.

Giraudeau sang Mars in the world premiere of Pierre Capdevieille's Les Amants captifs in 1960 and Du Bartas in the premiere of the comédie lyrique Colombe by Jean-Michel Damase and Jean Anouilh in Bordeaux on 5 May 1961, sang in the premiere of Marcel Landowski's L'Opéra de Poussière, the first 'world premiere' in the history of the Avignon Opera in 1962, and also created roles in operas by Claude Prey; Lui in Le cœur révélateur ou Les voliges in 1964, and L’homme occis ou Un tunnel sous le Mont-Blanc in 1975 (concert) and 1975 (stage).

Having been appointed as the head of vocal department in 1964, he became Director of the Opéra-Comique from 1968 to 1972, and began a policy of introducing more 20th-century works into the company repertoire, until, powerless and desperate, he saw the dissolution of its troupe.

Optimistic and affable, he later taught and directed and left a varied list of recordings both in the studio and from his many radio appearances.

== Discography ==
- Beethoven: Songs - Decca
- Berlioz: L'Enfance du Christ, op. 25 (solos) - Pathé
- Berlioz: Requiem (soloist) - Westminster XWN 2227
- Berlioz: Les Troyens (Enée) - BBC-SOMM-BEECHAM 26-8
- Bernier: Confitebor tibi Domine - Pathé DTX 158
- Bondeville: L'École des maris (Valère) - Decca
- Campra: Psaume LIII "Deus in nomine tuo" - Pathé DTX 270
- Charpentier: Lamentations pour les obsèques de la Reine Marie-Thérèse, H. 331 - Pathé DTX 270
- Charpentier: De Profundis (Tome XX des "Meslanges"), H. 189 - Pathé DTX 158
- Charpentier: Le Reniement de Saint Pierre, motet, H. 424, - Pathé DTX 259
- Charpentier: Miserere des Jésuites (Psaume L), H. 193 - Pathé DTX 228
- Escher: Univers de Rimbaud (solo) - Olympia OCD 506
- Gervais: Exaudiat Te (Psaume XIX) - Pathé DTX 228
- Gervais: Te Deum - Pathé DTX 259
- Hervé: Le Retour d'Ulysse (Ulysse) - Gaieté Lyrique 20221-2
- Hervé: Trombolino (Cantarini) - Gaieté Lyrique 20221-2
- Jolivet: Suite liturgique (solo) - Véga
- Lehár: Paganini (title role) - Accord 4728682
- Massenet: Thaïs (Nicias) - Urania
- Milhaud: Le pauvre matelot (sailor) - Disques Véga
- Milhaud: Christophe Colomb (Majordomo) - TCE 8750
- Mozart: Kyrie in F major, K. 33 (solo) - Pathé
- Offenbach: La belle Hélène (Ménélas) - Philips
- Offenbach: Geneviève de Brabant (Sifroy) - INA Mémoire Vive 080
- Poulenc: Mamelles de Tirésias (Le mari) - Columbia
- Ravel: L'heure espagnole (Gonzalve for Cluytens, VSM in 1953; Torquemada for Maazel, DG in 1965)
- Rimsky-Korsakov: Snegurochka (Tsar Berendey) - Ponto
- Rossini: Le Barbier de Séville (French version, with spoken dialogue, by Castil-Blaze) (Le Comte d'Almaviva) - recorded 1954-55, reissued by EMI France in 1993.
- Schubert: Mélodies De Schubert - Decca – FAT 173512
- Stravinsky: Renard (solo) - Adès
- Stravinsky: Le Rossignol (Fisherman) - Columbia
- Christmas at Notre-Dame (carols) - Concert Hall BM 2171
