= André Cluytens =

Belgian-born French conductor (1905–1967)

Andrè Cluytens
- Andrè Cluytens (photo with 1956 dedication)
- Born: 26 March 1905; Antwerp, Belgium
- Died: 3 June 1967 (aged 62); Neuilly-sur-Seine, France
- Occupation: conductor

Augustin Zulma Alphonse "André" Cluytens (French: [ɑ̃dʁe klɥitɛ̃s], Dutch: [ˈɑndreː ˈklœytəns]; 26 March 1905 – 3 June 1967) was a Belgian-born French conductor who was active in the concert hall, opera house and recording studio. His repertoire extended from Viennese classics through French composers to 20th century works. Although much of his career was spent in France, he was the first French conductor at Bayreuth in 1955; he also conducted The Ring and Parsifal at La Scala.

== Life and career ==
=== Belgium ===
Cluytens was born in Antwerp into a musical family: his paternal grandfather, father and uncles were all professional musicians. His mother was a soprano at the opera, and after she died in 1906 his father married another singer. He entered the Royal Conservatoire of Antwerp at the age of 9, graduating at 16 with first prizes in harmony and counterpoint, and piano. His father Alphonse, conductor of the Théâtre Royal Français Opera House, engaged his son as a chorusmaster and coach. He joined his father at the Opera, conducting productions there, making his debut on 14 December 1926 with Les pêcheurs de perles. In January 1927 he married Germaine Gilson, a soprano soloist in the troupe of the Théâtre Royal Français; they had one son, Michel (1943–69). Promoted to house conductor for the 1927–28 season, over the next five years Cluytens built up a broad opera (and ballet) repertoire in Antwerp: Mireille, Madama Butterfly, La traviata, La fille du régiment, La Basoche, Ma mère l'oye, Manon, La poupée de Nuremberg, Resurrection, Lucia di Lammermoor, Werther, Jeux, Le domino noir, Le voyage en Chine, Les Huguenots, Schwanda the Bagpiper, Salome and Angélique.

=== France ===
In 1932, he became the principal conductor at the Théâtre du Capitole of Toulouse, adding further to his repertoire, including operas such as Boris Godunov, Lohengrin, Ernani, Tannhäuser, Otello, Die Walküre and The Marriage of Figaro as well as several operettas. In 1935 he moved to the Opéra National de Lyon as principal conductor, adding more Wagner to his repertoire (Das Rheingold and Siegfried) and became the musical director there in 1942.

Cluytens volunteered to serve in the French army in September 1939 and following a medical examination was engaged as a French combatant, although he never saw action; he became a French citizen on 14 May 1940. Following the liberation of France, complaints from Bordeaux concerning his alleged collaboration with Nazi authorities in that city led to him being sentenced as part of the épuration; after appeal, on 24 May 1946 his sentence was revoked.

In 1947, he was appointed musical director at the Opéra-Comique, where he conducted 40 works between 1947–1953, including premieres of Le carosse du Saint Sacrement, Marion and Le Oui des jeunes filles. His well-regarded work at the Opéra-Comique included a successful renewal of The Tales of Hoffmann in a fresh production in April 1948; Francis Poulenc was delighted with his part in the recording with Opéra-Comique forces of his Les mamelles de Tirésias. Also notable was the revival after 180 years of Blaise le savetier (which was brought into the Salle Favart repertoire as a curtain-raiser for La boheme, Werther and La traviata), and the French premiere of The Rake's Progress in June 1953. His revival of Manon was highly praised – and representative of what Paris critics saw as a successful tenure at the Opéra-Comique; he also oversaw many all-Ravel evenings. Cluytens resigned from the Opéra-Comique in December 1953 and conducted his last performance there (Manon) on 30 September 1954. He became a Chevalier of the Légion d'honneur in 1953.

Having made his debut with the Paris Conservatoire Orchestra on 20 December 1942, he succeeded Charles Munch in 1949 as principal conductor, which post he held until 1960. His contract required him to conduct half of the orchestra's concerts each season; he also led them on foreign tours. Cluytens was due to conduct the first concert to be given by Alfred Cortot in Paris after his disgrace for Vichy activities, in 1947; in the event the concerto was dropped and Cluytens refused to acknowledge Cortot as he and the orchestra left the stage for Cortot to play solo. Cluytens conducted the Paris Conservatoire Orchestra in a Beethoven symphony cycle and then on its tour of Japan in 1964, continuing on his own to conduct the Sydney Symphony Orchestra, South Australian Symphony Orchestra, West Australian Symphony Orchestra, Victorian Symphony Orchestra and Queensland Symphony Orchestra into July that year.

=== International career ===
He led a famous performance of Wagner's opera Tannhäuser at the Bayreuth Festival on 23 July 1955, being the first conductor of French nationality to conduct at Bayreuth (and only the third non-German to conduct there, after Toscanini and de Sabata). His other work at Bayreuth up to 1965 consisted of Die Meistersinger von Nürnberg (1956, 1957, 1958), Parsifal (1957, 1965) and Lohengrin (1958), returning for Tannhäuser in 1965. According to Wolfgang Wagner, Cluytens was "universally liked for his amiable, open-minded attitude"; Hans Knappertsbusch was delighted when Cluytens requested that the older conductor introduce him to Parsifal.

He was to introduce Régine Crespin to Wieland Wagner, which led to her engagements at Bayreuth from 1958. Having conducted a Ring cycle in Lyon in 1959, Cluytens conducted three cycles at La Scala, Milan in 1963 (with Birgit Nilsson and Hans Hotter).

Cluytens made his debut with the Vienna Philharmonic Orchestra in 1948, and later toured the UK, the US and Canada with the orchestra in 1956. He also worked with the Berlin Philharmonic as a guest conductor, making the very first recording of the complete Beethoven symphonies with that orchestra. Cluytens was well-versed in the German repertoire, and was also noted for authoritative interpretations of Ravel and other modern French composers.

From 1964 he had a close relationship with Anja Silja, whom he had met in Bayreuth and first conducted in Salome at the Paris Opera. His death at the age of 62 occurred coincident with his reputation emerging not just primarily as a conductor of the French classics, but as an interpreter of the standard German/Austrian repertoire.

Cluytens died in 1967 at Neuilly-sur-Seine, France. The German soprano Anja Silja bought his former home in Paris and has resided there ever since.

== Recordings ==
A prolific recording artist, Cluytens signed a contract with the French branch of EMI Pathé-Marconi in 1946. He recorded an extensive series of complete French operas with the forces of the Opéra-Comique and the Opéra National de Paris. He also recorded a wide range of orchestral works by the French masters, two traversals of the orchestral works of Ravel, and a complete cycle of Beethoven's nine symphonies with the Berlin Philharmonic in 1957–1960. Many of his records, and some live performances, have since been re-issued on CD, while film of him conducting Ravel and Tchaikovsky (with Emil Gilels) have been presented on DVD. He may be seen during the overture of the film Le Barbier de Séville.

Cultural offices
Preceded by Charles Münch	Principal Conductor, Orchestre de la Société des Concerts du Conservatoire; 1946–1960	Succeeded by none
