= André Dran =

French opera singer

André Theophile Joseph Dran (15 June 1924, in Metz – 12 September 2014, in Pouancé) was a French tenor, whose career was mainly restricted to France and who left several complete opera recordings.

== Life and career ==
Dran appeared at the Paris Opéra-Comique from 1953 to 1970, undertaking roles such as Pomponnet in la Fille de Madame Angot, Antonin in Ciboulette, Nadir in Les Pêcheurs de perles, Beppe in Paillasse, Benoît in Le roi l'a dit, Pinkerton in Madama Butterfly, Alfred in La Chauve-Souris and Jean in Le Jongleur de Notre-Dame.

In the 1954 revival of Massenet's Jongleur de Notre-Dame one critic commented that Dran took the leading part "with great charm and intelligence. His voice sounded a little strained at times, but a more sensitive rendering of the role could not be imagined : even the juggling tricks and the dances were convincingly performed".

Dran appeared in the premieres of Jean-Michel Damase's Colombe at the Bordeaux May Festival in 1961, in a production by Roger Lalande conducted by the composer, La Symphonie Pastorale by Guillaume Landré in Rouen in 1968 conducted by Pierre-Michel Leconte, as the Man in Bondon's La Nuit foudroyée in Metz in 1968, and in Goya by Tony Aubin at the Théâtre Municipal de l'Opéra in Lille during the 3rd Festival de Lille in 1974, conducted by the composer.

Dran participated in a rare revival of La Basoche at Enghien-les-Bains Casino in 1958 with Lillie Grandval and Willy Clément conducted by Jésus Etcheverry, and a successful production of Delibes's Le Roi l'a dit in Bordeaux and Paris in 1959 with Christine Harbell, Hélène Régelly and Louis Noguéra, in which his Benoit was described as "skilled yet easy-going".

He also appeared in Fortunio in Enghien-les-Bains in 1957, The Rape of Lucretia in Rouen in 1966, Fra Diavolo in Marseille in 1967, and Le Pont des soupirs in Bordeaux in 1969.

Among Dran's recordings are La Belle Hélène by Offenbach (Pâris) conducted by Leibowitz (Nixa, 1952), Orphée aux enfers by Offenbach (Pluton-Aristée) conducted by Leibowitz (Nixa, 1952), L'Heure espagnole by Ravel (Gonzalve) conducted by Leibowitz (Vox, 1952), Les Troyens à Carthage by Berlioz (Iopas) conducted by Hermann Scherchen (Westminster, 1952), Louise by Charpentier (Le poète) conducted by Jean Fournet (Philips, 1956) and La Grande-Duchesse de Gérolstein by Offenbach (Fritz), conducted by Leibowitz (Urania, 1958). A live 1971 broadcast of Le Comte de Luxembourg by Franz Lehár (French version - Comte Fernand de Luxembourg), conducted by Adophe Sibert, has been reissued on Naxos.

André Dran married the soprano Monique de Pondeau. He was the father of the tenor Thierry Dran (1953-2021) who had a career in European opera houses and recordings and author of Le chant m'a sauvé (2007). His grandson, also a tenor, is Julien Dran (son of Thierry Dran and Martine March, born 1983) who has appeared in principal roles at the Opéra de Metz, Opéra de Bordeaux and Opéra de Marseille, and who was a winner at the Paris Opera Awards in 2013.
