= Lillie Grandval =

French opera singer

Lillie Grandval (Frankfurt, 20 December 1904 – 21 August 2000) was a French soprano, active in opera and operetta for over 30 years, and described as "One of the most popular French singers of her generation".

== Life and career ==
Born Lillie Millot, she studied at the Paris Conservatoire under Thomas Salignac, and sang in music-hall and took part in the Lyon premiere of Le Tzaréwitch (Sonia) in 1929.

She made her debut at the Paris Opéra-Comique on 15 December 1932 in Le pré aux clercs (Marguerite de Valois). With the company she went on to sing (Isabelle) in the same opera, the title role in Manon, Mignon (Philine), the title roles in Mireille, Phryné and Louise, Carmen (Micaela), La Traviata (Violetta), Le Barbier de Séville (Rosine), les Pêcheurs de perles (Léïla), Les contes d'Hoffmann (Olympia, Giulietta, Antonia), Madame Butterfly (Butterfly), La Basoche (Marie d'Angleterre), Fragonard (la Guimard), Fortunio (Jacqueline), Angélique (Angélique), la Rôtisserie de la Reine Pédauque (Catherine), Le Roi d’Ys (Rozenn), La Bohème (Mimi, Musette), Mesdames de la Halle (Ciboulette), Ciboulette (Zénobie) and Falstaff (Alice Ford).

She partnered leading French tenors in many of these works, as well as Jan Kiepura and Giacomo Lauri-Volpi in La Bohème.

Grandval became a "divette d'opérette" during the war years, leading to many performances in around the provinces of France and into Belgium and Switzerland. She also sang regularly on the radio. During these years Grandval sang at the Châtelet in the 1941 revival of Valses de Vienne to the music of the Father and Son Strauss, then took part in the premiere of its French counterpart Valses de France (as Virginie) with popular pieces by Gounod, Bizet, Godard, Delibes, Hervé and Métra, adapted by Henri Casadesus who also added some numbers of his own, and with arrangements by his brother Francis Casadesus; this ran for over a year.

At the Salle Favart she took part in the premieres of Mon Ami Pierrot by Barlow in 1935 (singing Ninon) and l'École des Maris by Bondeville in 1935 (Isabelle) as well as the Paris premieres of Samuel-Rousseau's Tarass Boulba (Xénia) and Alfano's Cyrano de Bergerac (Roxane). Her last appearance at the Opéra-Comique was in 1953, but she continued to perform throughout France.

After her debut at the Paris Opera in 1946 with Gilda in Rigoletto she went on to sing Marguerite in Faust, Rozenn in Le Roi d'Ys and Hébé in Les Indes galantes at the Salle Garnier.

Later at Enghien-les-Bains Casino she sang Jacqueline in the 50th anniversary of Fortunio in 1957, and Marie d'Angleterre, alongside Willy Clément and André Dran, in a rare revival of La Basoche in 1958 conducted by Jésus Etcheverry.

== Recordings ==
Grandval participated in the 1943 recording of excerpts from L'étoile (Laoula) for Pathé.
