= Plutus (opera) =

Opera by Charles Lecocq

1886 vocal score of Plutus

Plutus is a three-act opéra comique by Charles Lecocq, with a libretto by Albert Millaud and Gaston Jollivet. It was first presented at the Opéra-Comique, Paris, on 31 March 1886; it was not a success and was taken off after eight performances. This was the first and last opera Lecocq wrote for the Opéra-Comique.

The story, with an ancient Greek setting, is loosely based on a play by Aristophanes, and portrays the damage that wealth can do to the course of true love.

== Background and performance history ==
Despite his great popularity with the Parisian public during the 1870s and early 1880s, Lecocq had not been invited to compose for the prestigious Opéra-Comique. In 1884 he finally received a commission to do so. Work proceeded slowly because Lecocq's health was uncertain, and he required serious surgery at one point, but the score was completed by the end of July 1885.

For the libretto Albert Millaud and Gaston Jollivet reworked a two-act verse comedy they had written in 1873 for the Théâtre du Vaudeville. The manager of the Vaudeville at the time of the first production was Léon Carvalho. He had gone on to be the director of the Opéra Comique, where the operatic version of Plutus was put into rehearsal in December 1885. Lecocq dedicated the score to him. For their plot, Millaud and Jollivet drew on Aristophanes' comedy Plutus, adding a love interest and softening the satire. The opera received notices ranging from polite to critical, and it was taken off after eight performances and replaced with a revival of Ambroise Thomas' Le songe d'une nuit d'été. Lecocq wrote no more works for the Opéra-Comique.

== Original cast ==
Juliette Patoret as Myrrha, 1886

- Plutus, God of Wealth (bass) – Lucien Fugère
- Chrémyle, a labourer (bass) – Hippolyte Belhomme
- Xinthias, son of Chremyle (tenor) – Jean Mouliérat
- Carion, slave (baritone) – Gabriel Soulacroix
- Xenon, a rich old man (tenor) – Pierre Grivot
- Blepsidème, a labourer (bass) – M. Balanqué
- Aristippe, a peasant (tenor) – M. Mauguière
- Lycas, a winemaker (tenor) – M. Sujol
- Cléomène, a winemaker (bass) – M. Étienne Troy
- Myrrha, fiancée of Xinthias (soprano) – Juliette Patoret
- La pauvreté (mezzo-soprano) – Blanche Deschamps-Jéhin
- Praxagora, a rich widow (mezzo-soprano) – Juliette Pierron
- A reaper (soprano) – Mlle. Dupont
- A reaper (mezzo-soprano) – Mlle. Degrandi

Source: Vocal score and Almanach des Spectacles.

== Synopsis ==
The opera is set in the ancient Greek world. The hero is Xinthias, son of a poor labourer, Chrémyle. He is attended by a slave, Carion, who is more clear-thinking than his master. Both master and slave are preoccupied with affairs of the heart: Xinthias loves and is loved by Myrrha; Carion does not love but is loved by Praxagora, a rich widow, whom he is anxious to avoid.

Scene from Act 3

Myrrha's father intends her to marry a rival suitor, Xénon, who is old and rich. Xinthias has consulted the oracle of Apollo, whose advice he follows in inviting into his house a blind and ragged tramp, who accepts his hospitality. The tramp is Plutus, the god of wealth, who rewards Xinthias by diverting the River Pactolus through the house. The waters of the Pactolus contain copious amounts of gold, and Xinthias becomes immensely rich. The waters flow through the local village, whose inhabitants, previously peaceable, become corrupted by the gold and jealousy, feuding and gossip are prevalent. Plutus's counterpart, the personification of poverty, appears and warns the villagers of the perils of wealth, but they drive her away.

Chrémyle now considers Myrrha an unequal match for his millionaire son, and the young lovers are disconsolate at his decision to forbid their marriage. Their despair touches the old man, who relents. But Myrrah now hesitates, feeling Xinthias's wealth may form a barrier between them. The young couple sing of gold as the curse of the world. Plutus takes pity on them and restores the lovers and their neighbours to poverty, love and happiness. He leaves. Carion comments that if wealth does not buy happiness it certainly goes some way to contributing to it.

Source: The Era.

== Numbers ==
Act 1

- Prelude
- Chorus – Ah! Nous avons quitté la chaumière (Ah! We have left the thatched cottage)
- Duet (Myrrha, Xinthias) – A l'heure où l'ombre croît (At the hour when the shadows are lengthening)

Act 2

- Entr'acte
- Couplets (Carion) – Je pourrais trouver mieux, sans doute (I could probably find better)
- Duet (Praxagora, Carion) – Ah! ce vin est une merveille (This wine is a marvel)
- Quartet (Myrrha, Praxagora, Xinthias, Carion) – A-t-elle vu son père? (Has she seen her father?)
- Madrigal (Xénon) – Que dites-vous là, ma pervenche (What do you say, my periwinkle?)
- Duet (Xinthias, Carion) – Elle est partie! — Oui, maître! (She has gone! Tes, master)
- Quartet (Xinthias, Carion, Chrémyle, Plutus) – Dites-moi, citoyens, le chemin pour Athènes (Citizens, tell me the way to Athens)
- Trio (Carion, Chrémyle, Plutus) – Nous le tenons! Il est à nous! (We hold it! It is ours)
- Finale – Mes amis, l'heure est opportune (My friends, the time is right)

Act 3

- Chorus – Le vin joyeux rit dans l'amphore (The happy wine laughs in the amphora)
- Bacchic couplets (Plutus) – A nous les vins, à nous les roses (To us the wines, to us the roses)
- Air (Myrrha) – Vénus, que traînent les colombes (Venus, with doves following in your wake)
- Duet (Myrrha, Xinthias) – Saluons d'un si beau jour (Greet so beautiful a day)
- Trio (Myrrha, Xinthias, Chrémyle) – Ta fiancée? (Your fiancée?)
- Morceau d'ensemble – Cela n'est pas de jeu (This is no game)
- Duet (Praxagora, Carion) – Est-ce toi que j'entends (It is you I hear)
- Couplets (Carion) – J'aurais voulu, sur mon âme (I should have liked, upon my soul)
- Finale – Restez! je plains voire souffrance (Stay! I feel pity for suffering)

Source: Vocal score.

== Critical reception ==
By 1886 Lecocq had an international reputation, and critics from Britain and the US as well as France attended the first night. In Le Ménestrel, Henri Moreno wrote that some numbers were overlong, but that on the whole the opera "does M. Lecocq much honour and deserves to be repeated". An American reviewer thought that although the piece did not match Lecocq's most celebrated opera, La fille de Madame Angot, in popular appeal, it contained "many charming airs, both gay and plaintive, some of which may possibly receive the honors of the barrel-organ". A British critic in The Musical World described the piece as a brilliant success, but his confrère in The Era disagreed: "The composer has not been equal to his reputation and his Plutus must be set down as the most unsuccessful and insignificant of his works ... the score is miserably weak as a whole". In a 2015 study of operetta, Robert Letellier comments that either Lecocq found the antique poem incompatible with his strengths as a composer or he was ill at ease writing for the prestigious Opéra Comique.

== References and sources ==
=== Sources ===
- Lecocq, Charles; Albert Millaud; Gaston Jollivet (1886). Plutus, Opéra comique en trois actes. Paris: Brandus. OCLC 474080983.
- Letellier, Robert (2015). Operetta: A Sourcebook. Volume I. Newcastle: Cambridge Scholars Publishing. ISBN 978-1-4438-6690-3.
- Milliet, Paul; Albert Soubies (1886). Almanach des spectacles. Vol. 13. Paris: Librarie des bibliophiles. OCLC 868203773.
- Wright, Lesley (2009). "Carvalho and the Opéra Comique". Music, Theater and Cultural Transfer: Paris, 1830–1914. Annegret Fauser and Mark Everist (ed). Chicago: University of Chicago Press. ISBN 978-0-226-23926-2.
