= Jeanne Leclerc =

French operatic soprano

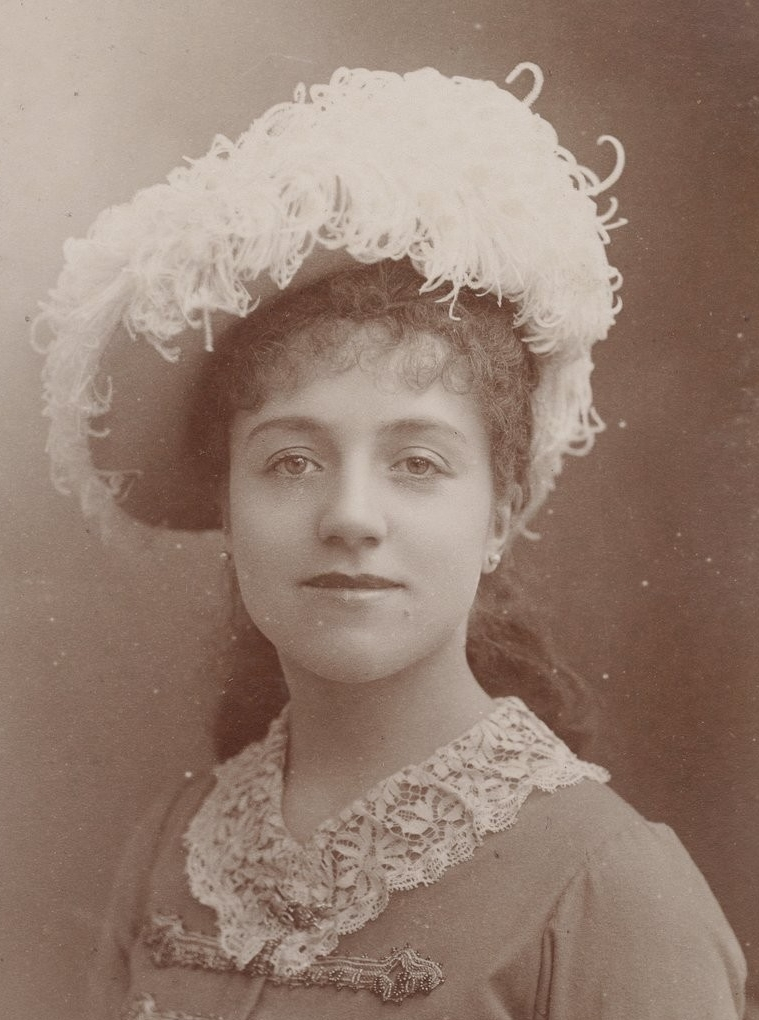
Jeanne Leclerc in Le Bossu (1888)

Jeanne Leclerc (1868 – August 1914) was a French operatic soprano who made her début in Paris in 1888 as Aurore de Nevers in the première of Charles Grisart's Le Bossu. From 1890 to 1905, she performed in a wide variety of soprano roles at the Opéra-Comique. She also appeared in Monte-Carlo and Covent Garden as well as in concerts at the Théâtre du Châtelet.

== Biography ==
Born in Lille in 1868, Leclerc trained at the Paris Conservatory under Léon Duprez and Eugénie Vergin. She made her début in Paris at the Théâtre de la Gaîté on 19 March 1888 creating the role of Aurore de Nevers in the première of Charles Grisart's Le Bossu. In November 1889 she was engaged by the Opéra-Comique where she first performed on 30 May 1890 in the première of André Messager's La Basoche as the First Young Girl.

At the Opéra-Comique she also performed in several other premières: as Rosette in Antoine Banès's Madame Rose (September 1893), as Hortense in André Gedalge's Pris au piège (June 1895), as Mélie in Théodore Dubois's Xavière (November 1895) and as Amore in the Opéra-Comique's first performance of Gluck's Orphée et Eurydice (March 1896). She also performed soprano roles in several other operas, including Carmen, Les dragons de Villars, Lakmé, Les noces de Jeannette, Philémon et Baucis and Werther.

She sang on several occasions in Monte-Carlo, in particular as Tyndaris in the première of Isadore de Lara's Messaline in March 1899. That year, at the Théâtre de la Renaissance in Paris, she performed the role of Lucie in Donizetti's Lucie de Lammermoor together with Gabriel Soulacroix. In November 1899, also at La Renaissaince, she created Chloé in Henri Maréchal's Daphnis et Chloé.

Jeanne Leclerc died in Paris in mid-August 1914.
