= Mamsell Nitouche (1932 film) =

1932 film

- Directed by: Carl Lamac
- Written by: Henri Meilhac (libretto); Albert Millaud (libretto); Richard Genée (libretto's German translation); Hans H. Zerlett
- Starring: Anny Ondra; Georg Alexander; Oskar Karlweis; Hans Junkermann
- Cinematography: Otto Heller
- Music by: Hervé
- Production companies: Ondra-Lamac-Film; Vandor Film
- Distributed by: UFA
- Release dates: 17 October 1931 (Sweden); 23 February 1932 (Germany)
- Running time: 76 minutes
- Countries: France; Germany
- Language: German

Mamsell Nitouche is a 1932 French-German operetta film directed by Carl Lamac and starring Anny Ondra, Georg Alexander and Oskar Karlweis. The film is the German-language version of the 1931 French film Mam'zelle Nitouche, directed by Marc Allégret. Both films are based on the 1883 operetta Mam'zelle Nitouche. The film's art direction was by Heinz Fenchel. It premiered at the Ufa-Palast am Zoo in February 1932.

== Cast ==
- Anny Ondra as Mamselle Nitouche
- Georg Alexander as Leutnant Champlatreux
- Oskar Karlweis as Célestin, organist
- Hans Junkermann as Major Gibus
- Julia Serda as Die Oberin, Madame Audrin
- Yvonne Albinus as Corinne
- Karl Forest as Theaterdirektor

== Bibliography ==
- Grange, William (2008). Cultural Chronicle of the Weimar Republic. Scarecrow Press. ISBN 978-0-8108-5967-8.
