= Albert Wolff (journalist) =

French writer, dramatist, journalist and art critic

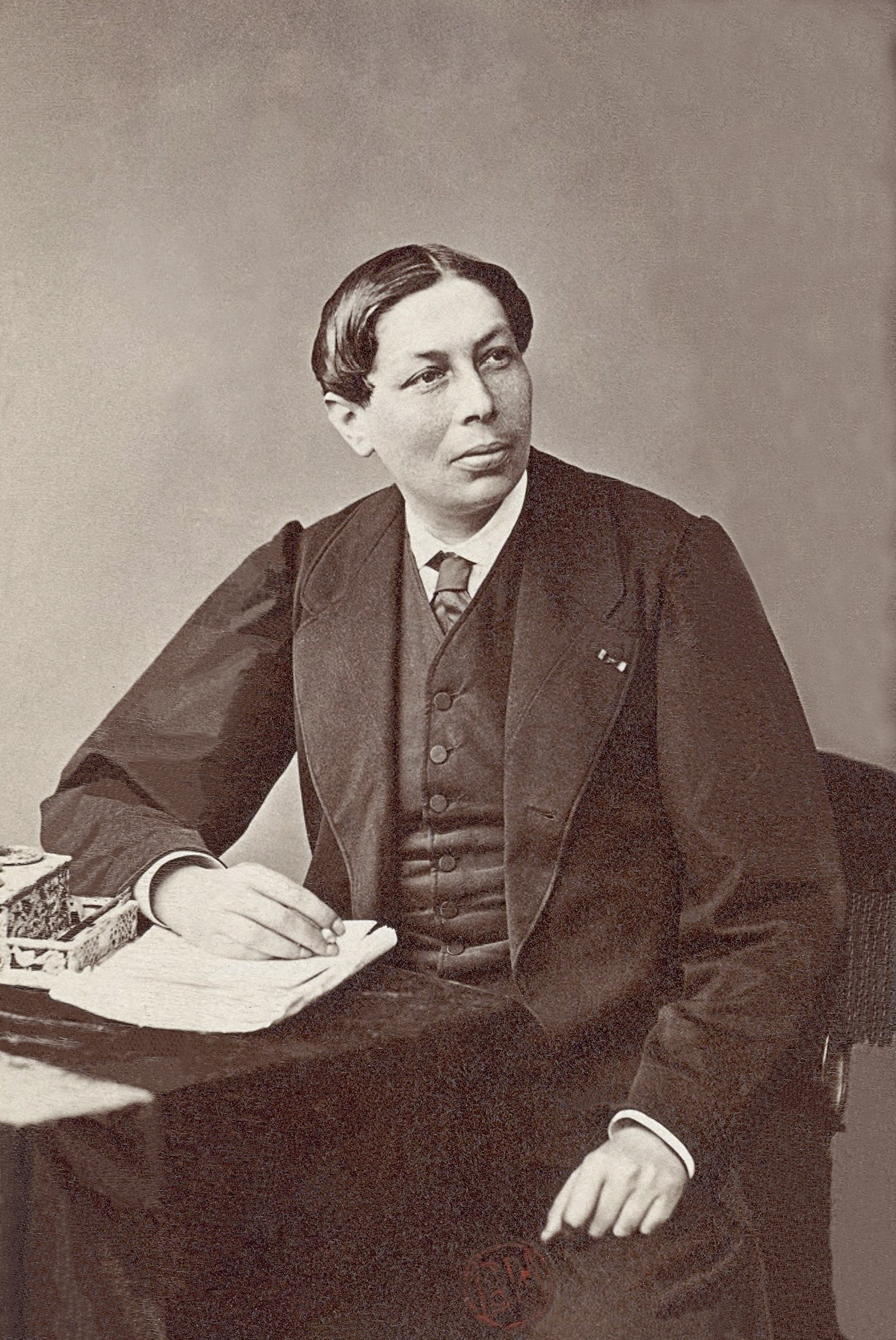
Albert Wolff

Albert Abraham Wolff (31 December 1825, Cologne – 22 December 1891, Paris) was a French writer, dramatist, journalist, and art critic who was born in Germany.

== Biography ==
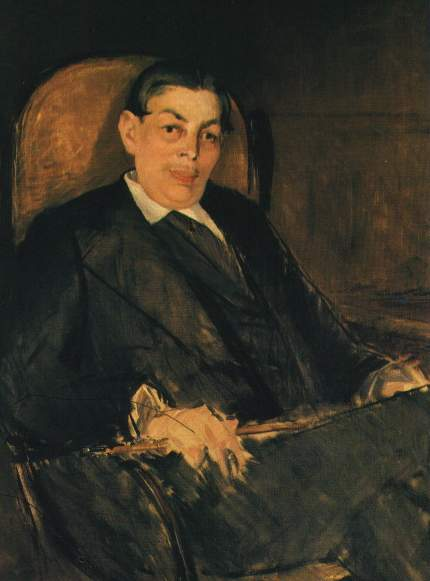
Portrait of Wolff by Manet

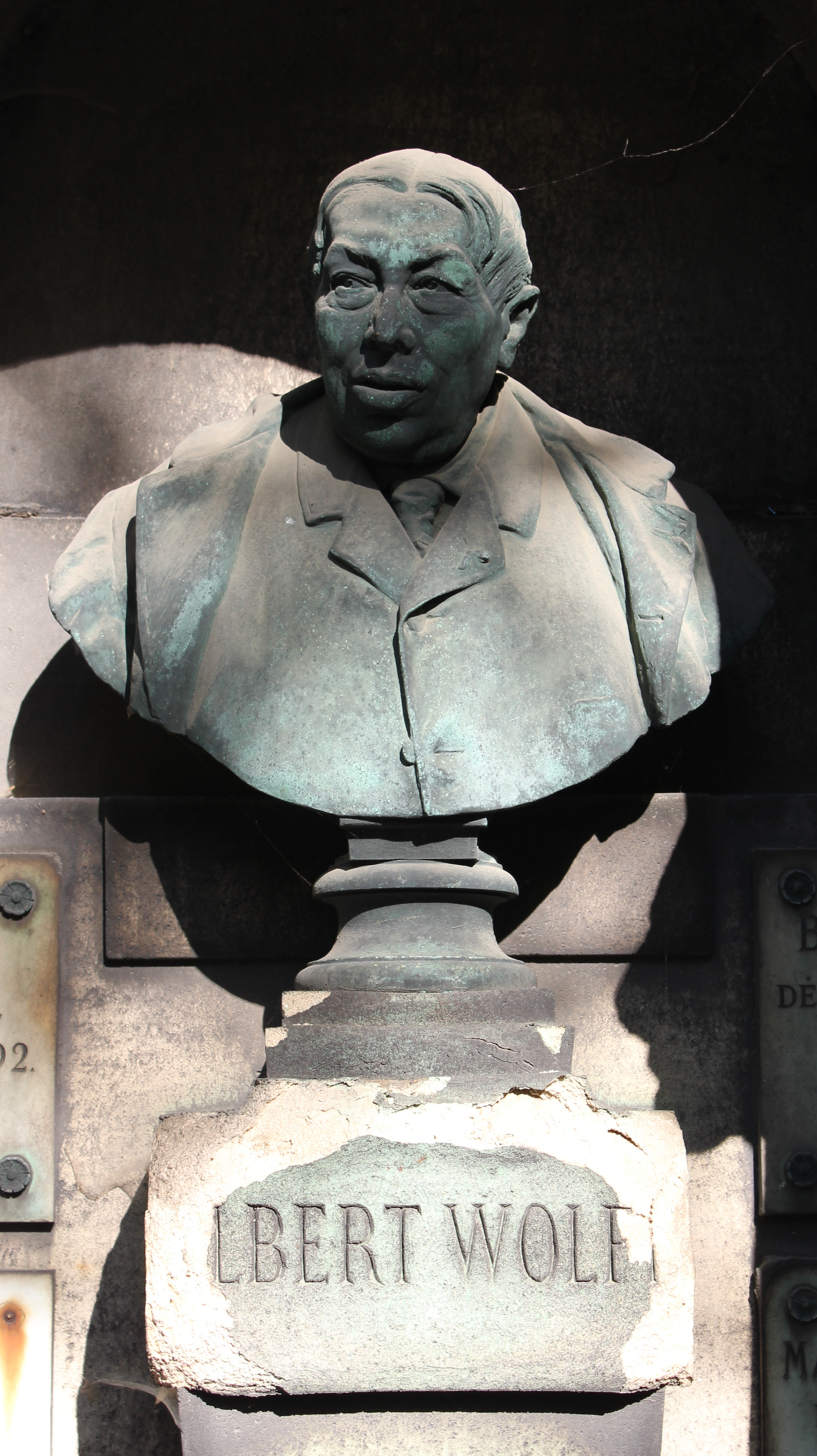
Wolff's grave with bust by Jules Dalou

Wolff graduated from a trade school after teaching in Paris. This was followed by a degree in Bonn before he settled in Paris in 1857. There he worked as a secretary for Alexandre Dumas. From 1859 he was editor of Le Charivari under the pseudonym Charles Brassac. He moved to Le Figaro where he became a leading art critic and was later promoted to editor of the newspaper. His discussions of the Paris Salon had a great impact of the success of contemporary artists. Wolff supported academic painting, with Jean-Louis-Ernest Meissonier as one of his favourite artists. Moreover he was intensively connected with contemporary French artists, a. o. the painters of the Barbizon School who he visited and interviewed frequently. In his publication of 1886: 'Notes upon certain Masters of the XIX century' Wolff described the French painters whose pictures were exhibited on the exhibition 'Cent Chefs-d'Oeuvres: the Choiche of the French Private Galleries', in Paris, 1883. Wolff opposed Impressionism, although occasionally he praised individual works from this school. He also published detailed observations of Paris in several books and wrote several novels and stage plays. Politically, he opposed antisemitism.

He is buried in cimetière du Père-Lachaise (96th division).

== Works ==
- Mémoires de Thérésa, écrits par elle-même, 1865
- Mémoires du boulevard, 1866
- Deux empereurs (1870-1871), 1871
- Le Tyrol et la Carinthie, mœurs, paysages, légendes, 1872
- Victorien Sardou et l'Oncle Sam, avec les documents relatifs à la suppression de la pièce, 1874
- Mémoires d'un Parisien : Voyages à travers le monde, 1884
- Mémoires d'un Parisien : La Haute-Noce, 1885
- Mémoires d'un Parisien : L'Écume de Paris, 1885
- Mémoires d'un Parisien : La Gloire à Paris, 1886
- La Capitale de l'art, Paris, 1886
- Mémoires d'un Parisien : La gloriole, 1888
- Figaro-Salon, de 1885 à 1891
- Cent chefs-d'œuvre des collections parisiennes, 1888

Theatre

- Un homme du sud, à-propos burlesque mixed with distincts, with Henri Rochefort, Paris, théâtre du Palais-Royal, 31 août 1862
- Le Dernier Couplet, comédie en 1 acte, Paris, théâtre du Vaudeville, 8 novembre 1862
- Les Mystères de l'Hôtel des ventes, comédie-vaudeville en 3 actes, avec Henri Rochefort, Paris, théâtre du Palais-Royal, 27 juin 1863
- Les Mémoires de Réséda, souvenirs contemporains, avec Henri Rochefort et Ernest Blum, Paris, théâtre du Palais-Royal, 4 mai 1865
- Les Thugs à Paris, revue mêlée de chant, en 3 actes, avec Eugène Grangé, Paris, théâtre des Variétés, 20 novembre 1866
- Les Points noirs, comédie en 1 acte, Paris, théâtre du Palais-Royal, 17 avril 1870
- Paris en actions, revue en 3 actes, avec Raoul Toché, Paris, théâtre des Nouveautés, 15 décembre 1879
- Les Parfums de Paris, revue en 12 tableaux, avec Raoul Toché, Paris, théâtre des Nouveautés, 18 décembre 1880
- L'Alouette, comédie en 1 acte, avec Edmond Gondinet, Paris, théâtre du Gymnase-Dramatique, 14 février 1881
- La Vente de Tata, vaudeville en 3 actes, avec Alfred Hennequin, Paris, théâtre des Nouveautés, 15 septembre 1881
- Egmont, drame lyrique en 4 actes, avec Albert Millaud, musique de Gaston Salvayre, Paris, théâtre de l'Opéra-Comique, 6 décembre 1886

Varia

- Notice biographique publiée en préface des Notes d'un musicien en voyage de Jacques Offenbach, Paris, 1877 Texte en ligne
- Correspondance entre Albert Wolff et Marie-Lise B. : un amour romantique, Paris : La Pensée universelle, 1985

== Bibliography ==
- Gustave Toudouze, Albert Wolff : histoire d'un chroniqueur parisien, Paris : Victor Havard, 1883 Texte en ligne
- Guillaume Pradoura: Albert Wolff (1825-1891). Heurs et malheurs d’un critique influent in Bulletin de la Société de l'Histoire de l'Art Français. Année 2014, SHAF und Éditions de Boccard, Paris 2019.
