= La Roussotte =

1881 French vaudeville-opérette

- vaudeville-opérette by: Hervé, Charles Lecocq, and Marius Boullard
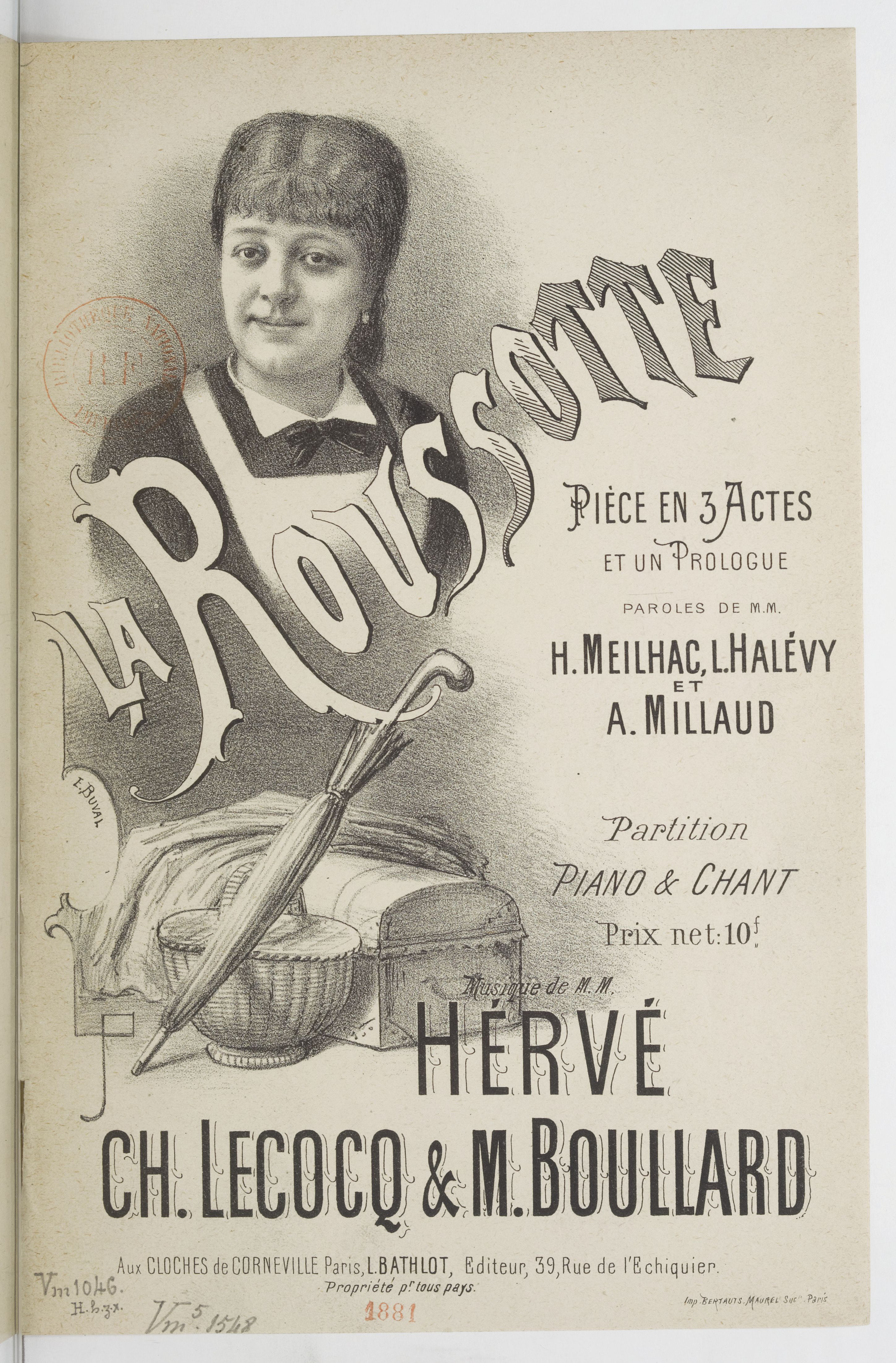
- Cover of the 1881 vocal score
- Librettist: Henri Meilhac, Ludovic Halévy, Albert Millaud
- Language: French
- Premiere: 28 January 1881; Théâtre des Variétés

La Roussotte (The Redhead) is a French vaudeville-opérette in three acts with a prologue. The words were written by Henri Meilhac, Ludovic Halévy, and Albert Millaud, and the music composed by Hervé, Charles Lecocq, and Marius Boullard. It was first performed on 28 January 1881 at the Théâtre des Variétés in Paris with Anna Judic in the title role. Although not quite as successful as Niniche (1878) or Mam'zelle Nitouche (1882), it was given over a hundred times in its first run, and Judic performed it around the world on tour as part of her repertoire.

== Bibliography ==
- Gänzl, Kurt (2001). The Encyclopedia of the Musical Theatre, second edition. New York: Schirmer Books. ISBN 9780028649702.
- Gänzl, Kurt; Andrew Lamb (1992). "Lecocq, (Alexandre) Charles", vol. 2, pp. 1119–1120, in The New Grove Dictionary of Opera, 4 volumes, edited by Stanley Sadie. London: Macmillan. ISBN 9781561592289.
