= Le jongleur de Notre-Dame (opera) =

Opera by Jules Massenet

- Opera by Jules Massenet
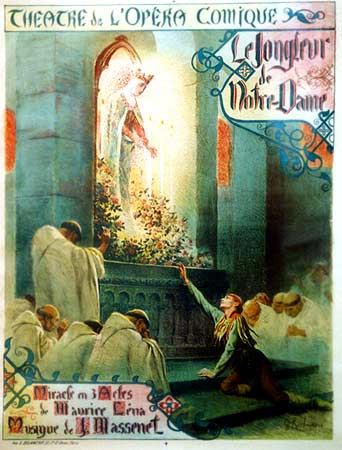
- Poster for the first Paris production (1904), depicting the closing scene
- Librettist: Maurice Léna
- Language: French
- Based on: "Le Jongleur de Notre Dame" by Anatole France
- Premiere: 18 February 1902; Opéra de Monte-Carlo

Le jongleur de Notre-Dame is a three-act opera (labelled in the programme as Miracle in Three Acts) by Jules Massenet to a French libretto by Maurice Léna. It was first performed at the Opéra Garnier in Monte Carlo on 18 February 1902. It is one of five operas Massenet set in the Middle Ages, the others being Le Cid (1885), Esclarmonde (1889), Grisélidis (1901), and Panurge (1913).

== Background ==
At this stage of his career, the concierge of Massenet's Paris home would normally sort out speculative libretti submitted to the composer, but the concierge being absent Massenet unexpectedly received the package from Léna and read it through on the train to his country home in Égreville. It is based on the story of the same name by Anatole France in his 1892 collection L'Étui de nacre, which was in turn based on a 13th-century medieval legend by the monk and troubadour Gautier de Coincy, c. 1220. Massenet had previously used France as a source for his 1894 opera Thaïs. In Le jongleur, uniquely for this composer, there are no roles of substance for women: the angels are off-stage and the virgin is mute. The work was composed in the spring of 1901, it became the first of his operas to receive its premiere at the Opéra in Monte-Carlo run by Raoul Gunsbourg.

In a centenary survey of the operatic output of Massenet, Rodney Milnes noted that "Le Jongleur is written off by too many because of its sentiment", despite the humorous characterization of the rival monks; the work also has Brother Boniface's Légende de la Sauge which recounts how the sage herb safe-guarded the infant Jesus from the soldiers during the Flight to Egypt. The work alternates morality and comedy, devotion and character portrait, and through different tones and colours avoids mawkishness and melodrama. Massenet inscribed the words Heureux les simples, car ils verront Dieu at the top of the manuscript score; Milnes noted that "simplicity was the guiding light without which this sentimental 'miracle in three acts' could have been a little sticky. As it is, it is profoundly moving, though of course one should not take the simplicity at face value – Massenet's infallible sense of theatrical effect lies behind every bar."

Despite its setting and cast list, a researcher has commented on the difficulty in pinning down real quotes from liturgical music in the score, although "parts of the opera convey the impression that they use existing material", because of what is described as "Massenet's technique of approximation and transformation". Jean's Alléluia du vin in act 1, or the monks' Benedicite are both hard to match with an existing setting, and while they "may sound like real sacred music, it is virtually impossible to verify any specific origin".

== Performance history ==
Following the 1902 premiere in Monte Carlo, the opera was seen in Paris at the Opéra-Comique on 10 May 1904, with Maréchal repeating his premiere role, Lucien Fugère as Boniface, and André Allard as Prior. Later revivals included principal singers Charles Friant, Marcel Claudel (Jean), Jean Vieuille (Boniface), and Hector Dufranne (Prior). Up to 1950 the opera received 356 performances at the Salle Favart. Fugère was still playing Boniface at the Opéra-Comique in 1922 aged 74; it is likely that the role of Boniface was written specifically for him.

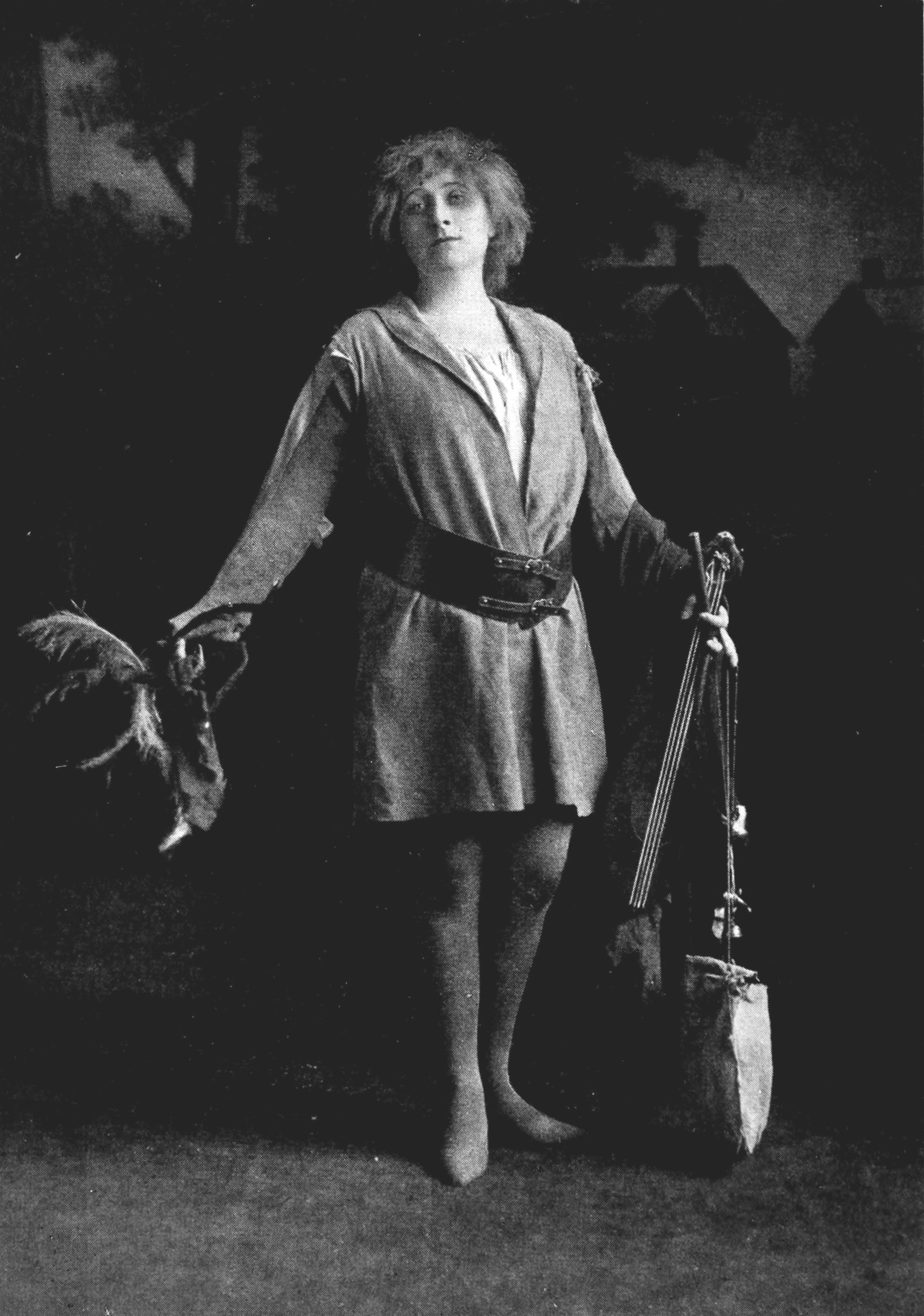
Mary Garden as Jean

Opera impresario Oscar Hammerstein I envisioned recasting the role of Jean the juggler as a star vehicle for the famous soprano Mary Garden with his Manhattan Opera Company; a casting choice which, according to some sources, horrified composer Massenet, who meant the role for a tenor. She performed the role for the work's United States premiere on November 27, 1908, at the Manhattan Opera House. Garden popularised the opera in the United States, performing it widely and with some frequency through 1931. Hammerstein also cast Jean as a soprano when he staged the work at his London Opera House in 1911, this time with French soprano Victoria Fer. After Garden's final performance of Jean with the Chicago Opera Company in 1931, the work was not performed in the United States again until soprano Colette D'Arville portrayed Jean with the Newark Civic Grand Opera in April 1942.

The work was revived at the Opéra-Comique in 1954, passing the 400th performance at the house, with André Dran singing Jean with "great charm and intelligence... even the juggling tricks and the dances were convincingly performed"; Louis Musy was Boniface, and Albert Wolff conducted. It was produced in Nantes in 1979 with Albert Voli in the title role and Jean-Christophe Benoît as Boniface. Preceded by Massenet's ballet Cigale, contemporary of the opera, Le jongleur was performed at the Massenet Festival in 2005 conducted by Laurent Campellone with American tenor, Jesús Garcia, "whose theatrical and gymnastic experience stood him in good stead" as Jean, Lionel Lhote as Boniface, and Fernand Bernadi as the Prior, in a production by Jean-Louis Pichon.

Outside France, the opera was seen at the Théâtre Municipal (Avenue Bourguibain) in Tunis in 1912. After its local premiere in 1904 it was regularly revived at La Monnaie (Brussels) up to November 1956, where the lead role was taken Jean Marcor in his stage debut, with Jean Laffont as Boniface and Germain Ghislain the Abbot. A production of Le jongleur de Notre-Dame in Boston in 1961 by the New England Opera Theater featured "singer-actor-juggler-dancer" Tommy Rall; Spiro Malas was Boniface. Yan Pascal Tortelier conducted the opera at Wexford in 1984, with Patrick Power, Sergei Leiferkus and Christian du Plessis. The first performances at the Teatro dell'Opera in Rome were in April 2000, conducted by Gianluigi Gelmetti with Cecilia Gasdia and Massimo Giordano sharing the title role, and Massimiliano Gagliardo as Boniface and Nicolai Ghiaurov as Prior.

In Monte-Carlo in May 1978, the complete opera was recorded in stereo for the first time, and this recording, with the tenor Alain Vanzo as Jean and Jules Bastin as Boniface, was reissued on compact disc in 2003, followed by another CD containing a 1974 radio performance of the work, again with Vanzo.

== Roles ==
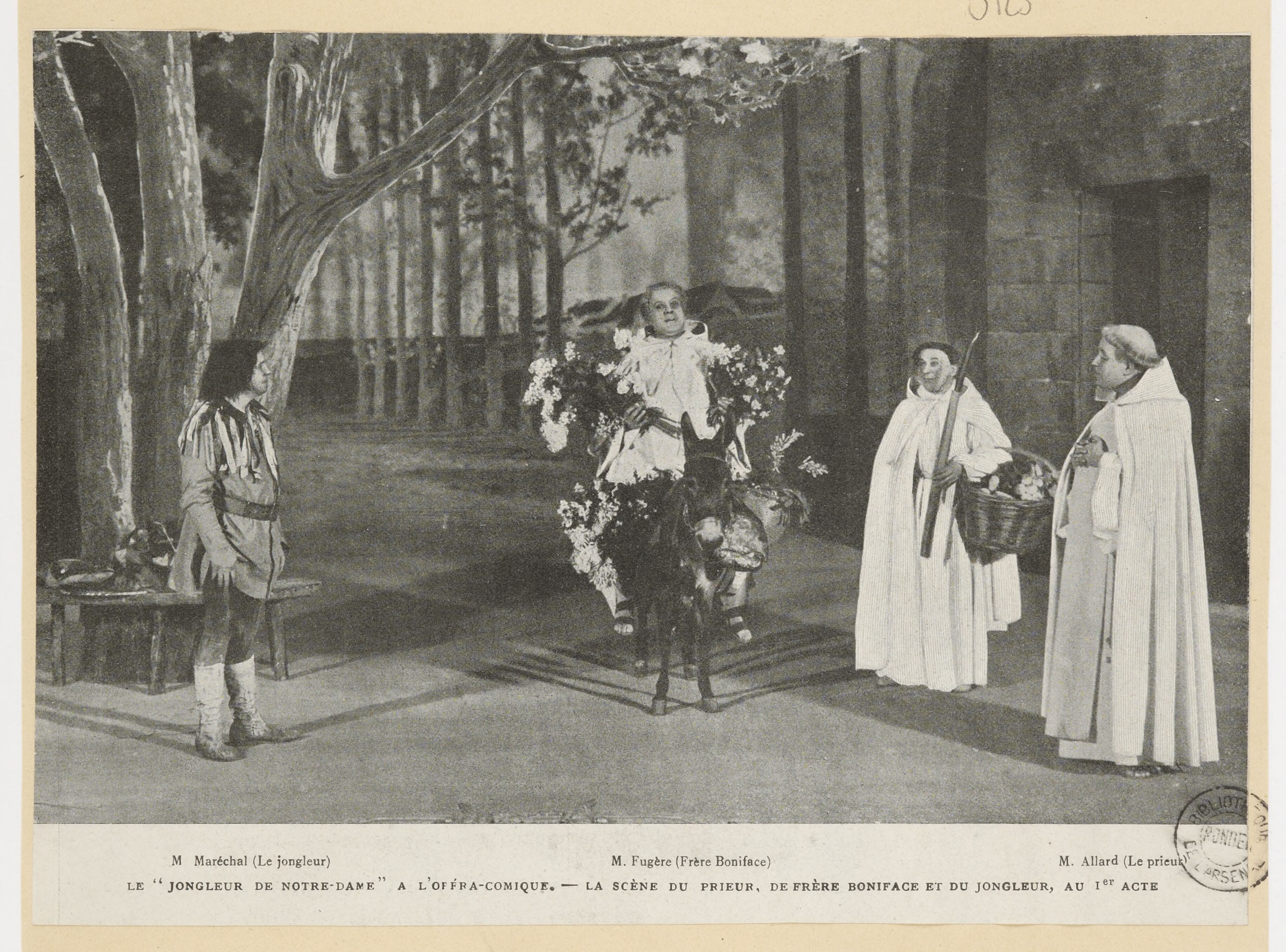
Le jongleur de Notre Dame at the Opéra-Comique, with Adolphe Maréchal, Lucien Fugère and André Allard

Roles, voice types, premiere cast
Role	Voice type	Premiere cast, 18 February 1902 Conductor: Léon Jehin
Jean, the juggler	tenor	Adolphe Maréchal
Boniface, the monastery cook	baritone	Maurice Renaud
Prior	bass	Gabriel Soulacroix
A poet monk	tenor	Berquier
A painter monk	baritone	Juste Nivette
A musician monk	baritone	Grimaud
A sculptor monk	bass	Crupeninck
Singer monk	baritone	Senneval
Monk, on guard duty	baritone	Delestang
A fellow	baritone	Borie
A drunkard	bass	Albert Paillard
A knight	tenor	Jacobi
1st angel	soprano	Marguerite de Buck
2nd angel	soprano	Marie Girerd
Apparition of the virgin	mute	Siméoli
A voice	baritone	
Townspeople, Knights, Clerks, Peasants, Beggars, Young girls and boys, Market-people ; Monks, Angelic voices.

== Synopsis ==
Place: France
Time: Medieval period

=== Act 1, Place de Cluny ===
There is singing and dancing in front of the monastery; Jean, a juggler, wants to earn money entertaining passers-by. Rejecting his clumsy tricks, they demand a profane song 'Halleluiah to wine'. He resists at first but then sings it. The prior appears and takes Jean to task but seeing that Jean is filled with remorse, the prior asks him to join the monks, to save his soul and body.

=== Act 2, the cloisters ===
Inside the monastery the monks undertake their various duties. Jean sees that although they honour the Virgin with beautiful Latin prayers, he is unable to offer her anything. The other monks quarrel as they offer to take him as a pupil. Befriended by the monastery's cook, Boniface sings him the legend of the sagebush which humbly opened its branches to shelter the Infant Jesus as He slept. When Jean sees that the other monks are offering lavish and beautiful gifts to the newly completed statue of the Virgin Mary, he, having no real gift, resolves to do what he can do best.

=== Act 3, in the chapel ===
The painter and sculptor monks admire their newly completed statue of the Virgin. As Jean enters the former hides behind a pillar, and watches as the juggler takes his habit off and puts his old street clothes on, at which the hidden monk goes to warn the prior. Playing his hurdy-gurdy, he dances, until the other monks enter, horrified, and are about to seize Jean to reprimand him for blasphemy. Boniface stops them as the statue of the Virgin comes to life, holds out her arms and blesses Jean. Jean falls to his knees as a heavenly light glows from the altar the Virgin ascends to Heaven. As the prior sings the words Massenet placed at the top of his score Heureux les simples, car ils verront Dieu (Blessed are the poor in spirit for they will find God), Jean dies, and the other monks, and angels, sing Amen.

== Recordings ==
Gabriel Soulacroix recorded the Prior's air, which he created, for Pathé in 1902/1903. Mary Garden, David Devriès, Marcel Claudel and Géori Boué popularized the aria "Ô liberté, ma mie".

The Légende de la sauge for Boniface has been recorded many times, singers including Paolo Ananian in 1907, Antonio Magini-Coletti in 1909 in Italian, Louis Dupuoy (as Jean Duez) in 1910, Édouard Rouard in 1921, Giuseppe Danise in 1926, Lucien Fugère in 1928, Étienne Billot in 1928, Vanni Marcoux in 1930, Roger Bourdin in 1933 and Michel Dens in 1947.

There have been two complete studio recordings:

- 1978: Alain Vanzo (Jean), Jules Bastin (Boniface), Marc Vento (Prior); Orchestra and Chorus of the Opéra de Monte-Carlo, Roger Boutry (EMI-Pathé)
- 2007: Roberto Alagna (Jean), Stefano Antonucci (Boniface), Francesco Ellero d'Artegna (Prior). Orchestre National de Montpellier Languedoc-Roussillon, Enrique Diemecke (Deutsche Grammophon)
