= Maurice Léna =

French dramatist and librettist

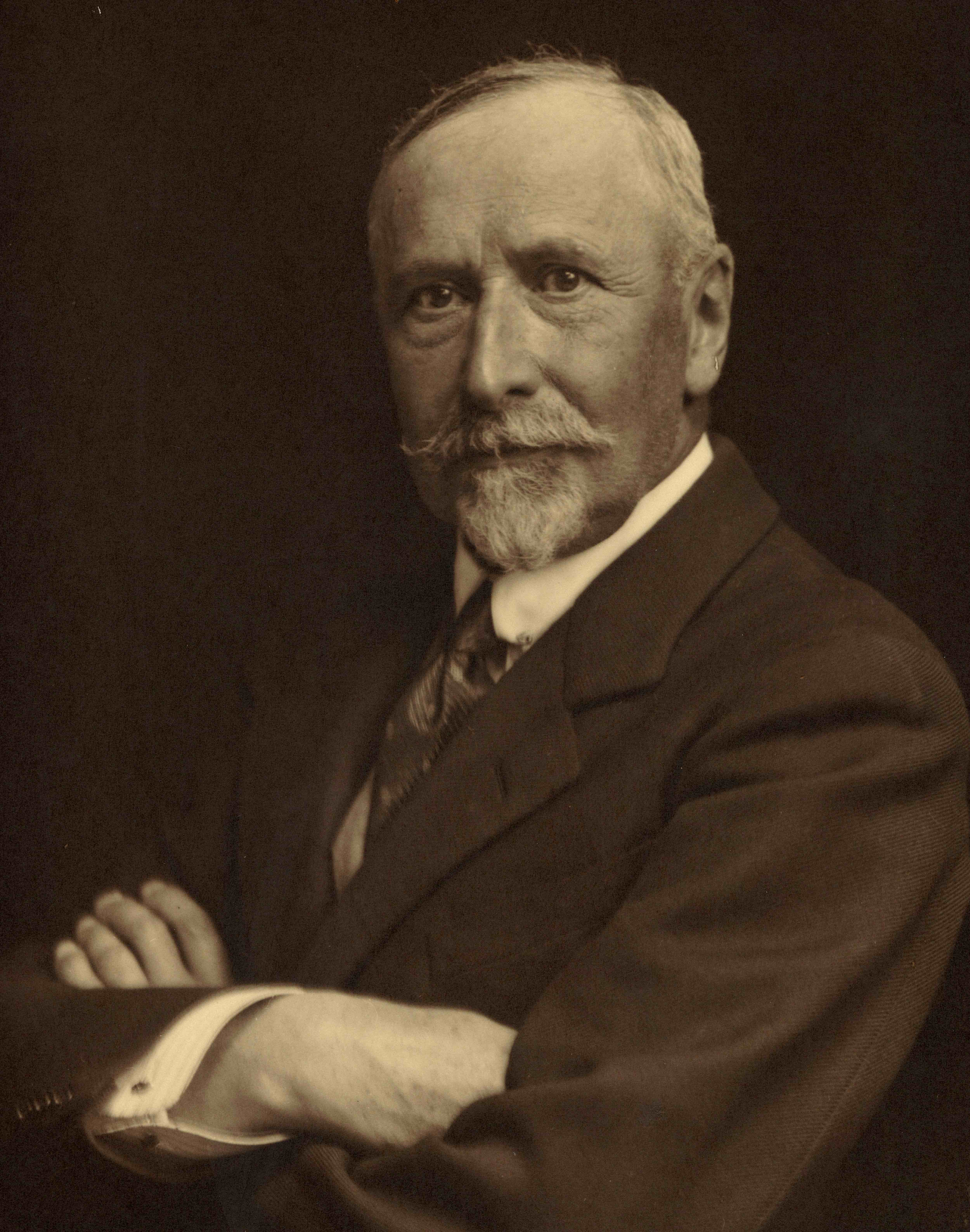
Maurice Léna

Maurice Léna (24 December 1859 – 31 March 1928) was a French dramatist and librettist of the Parisian Belle Époque. His opera librettos include Jules Massenet's Le jongleur de Notre-Dame (1902), Georges Hüe's Dans l'ombre de la cathédrale (1921), Charles-Marie Widor's Nerto (1924) and Henry Février's La Damnation de Blanchefleur (1920).

== Biography ==
A graduate of the École Normale Supérieure (Classics, 1881), he earned his agrégation in classical literature in 1885 and served as a rhetoric teacher at high schools in Auch (1885), Aix-en-Provence (1885–1888), Marseille (1889), Nîmes (1890–1891), Lyon (Ampère, 1891–1894), then Condorcet (Paris) and Lakanal (Sceaux), where he ended his teaching career, he distinguished himself through numerous librettos for opera and opéra-comique, the best known of which is Le Jongleur de Notre-Dame, set to music by Jules Massenet, performed in 1902 at the Monte Carlo Opera, then at the Opéra-Comique in Paris (1904), in Chicago (1907), and Buenos Aires (1915).

Among his other works: Dans l'ombre de la cathédrale (1921), premiered at the Opéra-Comique in Paris in 1921 (music by Georges Hüe); Nerto (1924), based on a poem by Frédéric Mistral, from which he adapted the libretto (music by Charles-Marie Widor); and La Damnation de Blanchefleur (1920) (music by Henry Février).

He maintained a lively correspondence with figures in the music world, particularly Jules Massenet, as well as with the philosopher Maurice Blondel. his friend and classmate from the Rue d'Ulm (Class of 1881, Faculty of Letters).
