= Musique en Wallonie =

Musique en Wallonie is a Francophone-Belgian classical music record label founded in 1971 dedicated to promoting awareness of Wallonia's musical heritage – both of Wallon composers and historical classical music recordings. The record label, based at the University of Liège, is a non-profit organization (French: association sans but lucratif (ASBL)), and receives support from the cultural section of the French Community of Belgium (an official constituent constitutional entity). In September 2012, on its 40th anniversary, the label was awarded officier du Mérite wallon. The label's president since 2001 has been Jean-Pierre Smyers, and the current administrator is Christophe Pirenne, a rock-drummer and music writer. For many years, the label has been issued through collaborating record companies – notably the contract with Cyprès but also with labels such as Koch-Schwann. Since 2004, the label has undertaken projects with its own brand, including reissues.

The historiques collection includes historical recordings by Walloon singers, such as sopranos Huberte Vecray (1923–2009) and Clara Clairbert, contralto Lucienne Delvaux (1916–2015), tenors René Maison, Marcel Claudel and Fernand Faniard, baritones Jean Noté, Ernest Tilkin Servais (1888–1961), Louis Richard, and Hector Dufranne, and bass Lucien Van Obbergh (1887–1959).

Aside from strictly "classical" music, the label has also undertaken projects related to the history of popular music, such as recordings by the salon ensemble the Tivoli Band under Éric Mathot, Magritte’s Blues, Bruxelles kermesse – Exposition universelle de 1910 and Café Liégeois, Musiques de salon (1910–1940).
