= Étienne Troy =

French opera singer

Étienne Troy (21 July 1844, Toulouse - 3 June 1909, Paris) was a French baritone opera singer who took numerous small roles in Paris for over 40 years and was later a stage manager at the Opéra-Comique.

== Life and career ==
The son of a hatter, Troy studied singing at the Paris Conservatoire where in 1864 he won the first prize in the opéra-comique competition. In 1865 he joined the Théâtre-Lyrique in Paris, where he sang in the premieres of Roméo et Juliette (Grégorio) by Gounod, and Les Bleuets (Don Ruy) by Jules Cohen, in 1867. He also sang in the French premieres of Joyeuses Commères de Windsor by Nicolai and 'Robin des Bois' (Der Freischütz) by Weber, in 1866.

In the 1870s he created roles in a pair of less successful Offenbach operas in 1873 La Jolie Parfumeuse (Germain) and in 1878 Maître Péronilla (Ripardos).

He joined the Opéra-Comique in 1879 where his many creations included an old man in Jean de Nivelle in 1880, Luther in les Contes d’Hoffmann in 1881, a sergeant in Manon in 1884 (also singing in the 500th performance in January 1905), a wine grower in Plutus in 1886, Caylus in le Roi malgré lui in 1887, Mauclerc in l’Escadron volant de la Reine in 1888, a saracen envoy in Esclarmonde in 1889, the king's equerry in La Basoche in 1890, Yahn in Kassya in 1893, Maillefer in Le Chevalier d’Harmental in 1896, the pleasures superintendent in Cendrillon in 1899, the first warden in Louise in 1900, and the concierge in la Carmélite in 1902.

Other roles at the Salle Favart included a guard in the Magic Flute, the officer in Le Barbier de Séville, the marquis in La Traviata, Berddret in Fervaal, recruiting master in Une aventure de la Guimard, several small roles in Le Pré-aux-Clercs, Antonio in Les Noces de Figaro, le Dancaïre, a guide and Lillas Pastia in Carmen, Urbain in Richard Cœur de Lion, the minister in les Dragons de Villars, Kaboul in Lalla-Roukh, Antonio in Mignon, the restaurant manager in Sapho, a herald in Phryné and the ferryman in Mireille. He became a stage manager at the Salle Favart in 1893, though continuing to appear on stage in small roles.

Troy became a member of the Société des Concerts du Conservatoire in 1893, retiring in 1904 and thus becoming an honorary member.

He was the younger brother of Eugène Troy (1836–71), a bass who followed a short but successful career at the same theatres. They both appeared in the premiere of Roméo et Juliette. The two brothers married sisters Emilie Lucie (Étienne) and Marie Antoinette Viel (Eugène).
