= La Basoche =

Opéra comique by André Messager and Albert Carré

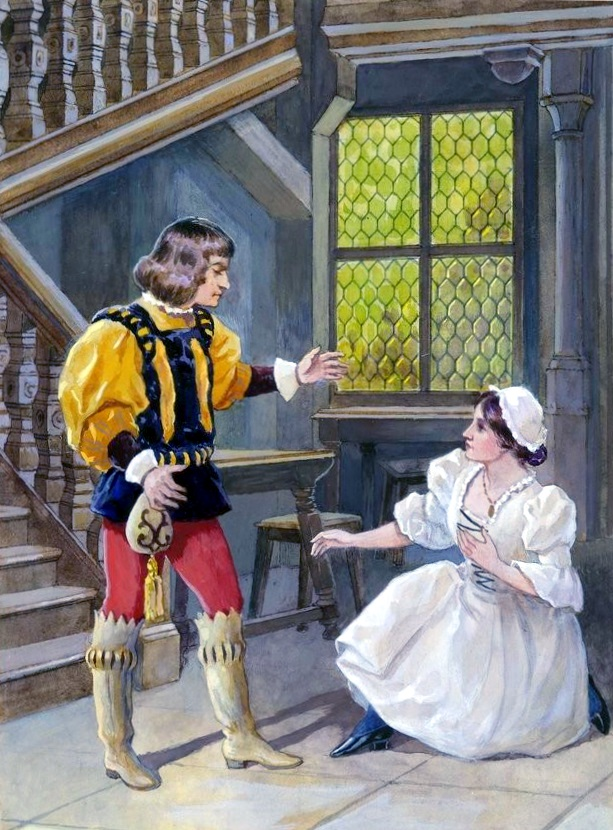
Scene from original production

La Basoche is an opéra comique in three acts, with music by André Messager and words by Albert Carré. The opera is set in Paris in 1514 and depicts the complications that arise when the elected "king" of the student guild, the Basoche, is mistaken for King Louis XII of France.

The opera was first performed at the Opéra-Comique in Paris in 1890. Productions soon followed in continental Europe, Britain and the US. After that, the piece was revived repeatedly in France and elsewhere well into the 20th century.

== Background and first production ==
During the 1880s Messager had met with mixed fortunes. His opérette La fauvette du temple (1885) and opéra comique La Béarnaise (1885) ran well, and his ballet Les deux pigeons (1886) was a box-office triumph. But in the late 1880s success eluded him, and he had three failures in a row: Le bourgeois de Calais (1888), Isoline (1888), and Le mari de la reine (1889). Carré, after a successful career as an actor, had turned to theatre management, and from 1885 he had been director of the Théâtre du Vaudeville. The two men were lifelong friends and had collaborated once before, on Les Premières armes de Louis XV (1888), a revised version of an opérette by Firmin Bernicat.

The Basoche of the title was an ancient Parisian guild of law clerks, which from 1303 until it was abolished in 1791 during the French Revolution was to some extent a state within a state, electing its own king and regulating its own affairs. La Basoche was first performed at the Opéra-Comique, Paris (then in temporary residence at the Salle du Théâtre Lyrique), on 30 May 1890 and had an initial run of 51 nights.

== Roles ==
Role	Voice type	Premiere cast 30 May 1890 (Conductor: Jules Danbé)
Clément Marot, member of the Basoche, age 19	baritone	Gabriel Soulacroix
Le Duc de Longueville	baritone	Lucien Fugère
Jehan L'Éveillé, member of the Basoche, age 20	tenor	Ernest Carbonne
Master Guillot, proprietor of the Plat-d'Etain inn	tenor (Note: Shown in the score as "Trial", a character tenor style named after Antoine Trial.)	Barnolt
Roland, student, member of the Basoche	bass	César Bernaert
Louis XII, king of France	tenor	— Maris
Chancellor of the Basoche	tenor	— Thierry
King's equerry	baritone	Étienne Troy
The grand provost	baritone	— Lonati
Nightwatchman	baritone	— Lonati
Marie d’Angleterre (Mary, princess of England)	soprano	Lise Landouzy
Colette, Clément's wife	soprano	Marie Molé-Truffier
First young girl	soprano	Jeanne Leclerc
Second young girl	mezzo-soprano	— Nazem
Chorus: Citizens, girls, clerks

Sources: Libretto and vocal score.

== Synopsis ==
The action takes place in Paris in 1514. In 1303, King Philippe IV had permitted the students of Paris to form a guild called "La Basoche". The guild continued for nearly five hundred years. The head of "La Basoche", elected annually, assumed the title of "King" and wore the royal crown and mantle. In the opera, the student Clément Marot is elected King of the Basoche and is mistaken for Louis XII, King of France.

=== Act 1 ===
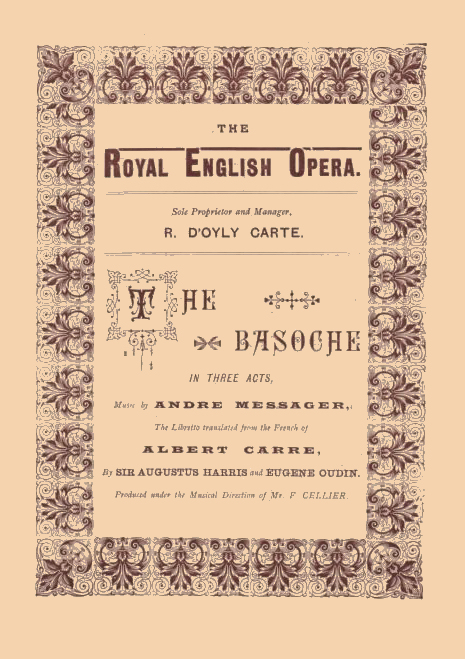
Programme for the first London production, 1891

A square near the Châtelet, on the right the tavern du Plat d’Etain. The day of the election of the king of the Basoche.

Clément Marot puts himself forward as a candidate against the pedant Roland (in a poem "Oui, de rimes je fais moisson"). As the king of the basochians is required to be a bachelor, he hides the existence of a wife, Colette, whom he has left behind in Chevreuse. When she arrives in Paris he pretends not to know her – but tells her secretly that he will rejoin her soon. She gets herself taken on at the tavern, where the next day the widowed Louis XII will receive his new young wife, Princess Mary of England, the sister of Henry VIII. Mary now arrives incognito, disguised as a Norman, accompanied by the Duc de Longueville. When the procession of the king of the Basoche comes along, Colette takes Marot to be the real king, while Mary thinks that the man is her husband.

=== Act 2 ===
Evening – a large room in the Plat d’Etain tavern.

While clerks party, and Roland hopes to unmask Marot and his wife, Colette, at work, dreams of her future life as a queen. In a duet, both Mary and Colette declare their love for the "king". The Duke returns from the royal palace where he has announced the arrival of Mary, who sends him off to request that the "king" attend her for dinner, and then goes off to get ready to receive him. Marot reaffirms his love for Colette, but Mary returns and sees the one she thinks is to be her husband; Colette begins to serve them dinner.

Roland's party burst in to reveal Marot's existing marriage, but it is Mary who says that she is the wife of the king and the duke who in turn says that he is Mary's wife. After everyone else has left, the king's entourage arrive – only for Colette to receive them, and be taken to the Hôtel des Tournelles.

=== Act 3 ===
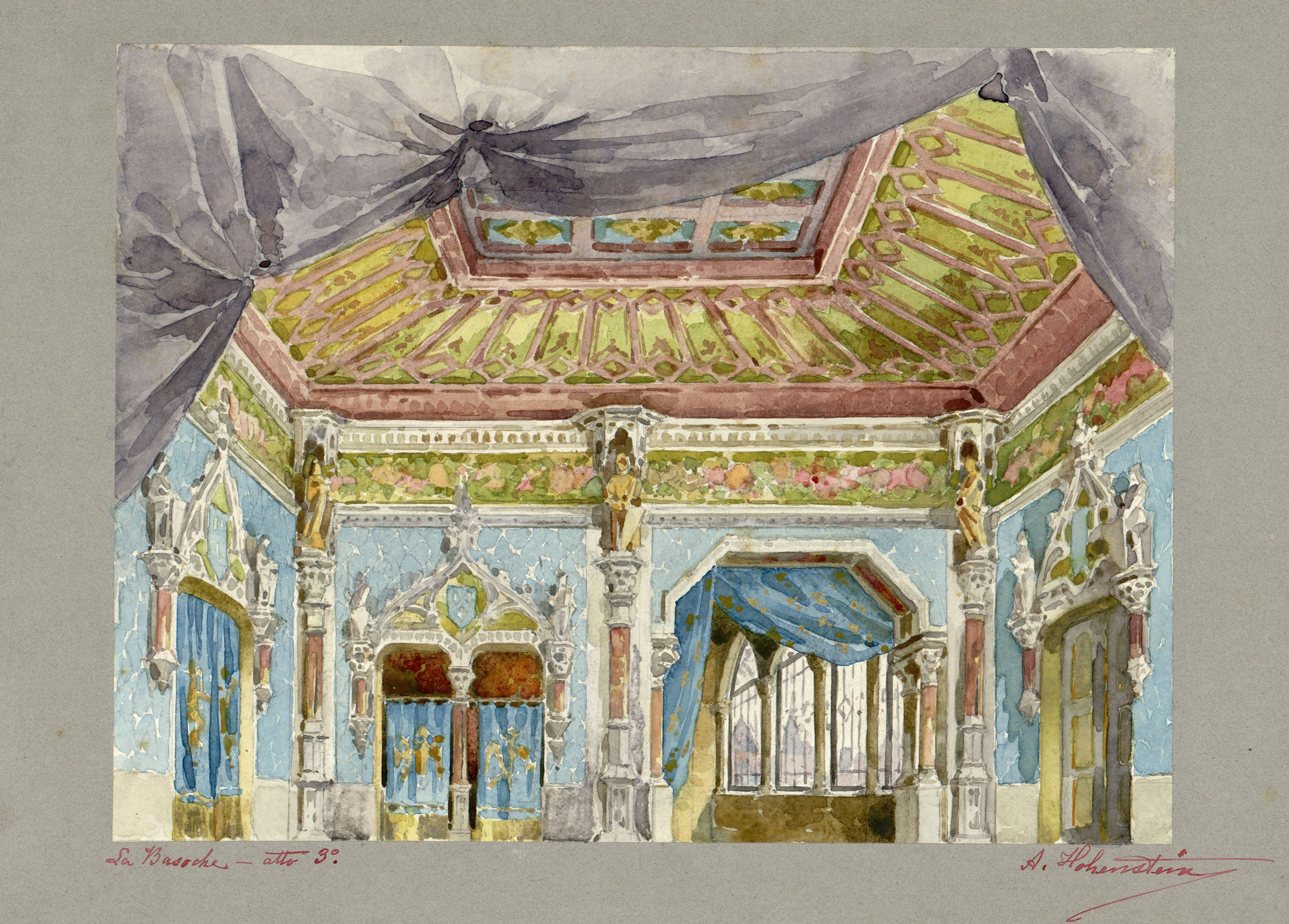
Sala del palazzo del re, set design for La Basoche act 3 (1893).

The Hôtel de Tournelles

Louis XII greets Colette, who cannot believe that the old man is her husband. Believing that he has been deceived, the King decides to send Longueville and Colette to England; alone, the duke thinks that the young woman loves him. The cortege of the Basoche passes by the palace, and the two women realise who their "king" was. Colette consoles herself with the thought that she will have Clément back. Mary is disappointed, finding the false king more charming than the real one.

The duke realizes what has happened and wants Marot arrested, but it is Roland, now the Basoche king, who is taken. Convinced that he will hang, Marot makes his farewell, but he is pardoned by Louis, and leaves Paris with Colette, while Louis marries Mary.

== Musical numbers ==
Act 1 in the original production

Act 3 in the original production

Act 1

- Introduction
- "C'est aujourd'hui que la Basoche" ("Today the Basoche" – Ensemble)
- "Je suis aimé de la plus belle" ("I am loved by the fairest" – Clément)
- "En attendant l'heure de la bataille" ("Until the time of the battle" – Guillot)
- "Quand tu connaîtras Colette" ("When you know Colette" – Clément)
- "Midi, c'est l'heure qui nous ramène" ("Noon, it's the time that brings us back" – Chorus)
- "Volage? Lui? Clément?" ("Fickle? Him? Clément?" – Colette)
- "Bonjour ami" ("Hello friend" – Colette, Clément, Roland, L'Eveillé, Chorus)
- "Dans ce grand Paris" ("In this great Paris" – L'Eveillé)
- "Nous reposer? C'est impossible Altesse" ("Rest? It is impossible, Highness" – Longueville, Marie)
- "Trop lourd est le poids du veuvage" ("The weight of widowhood is too heavy" – Longueville)
- Finale I " Vive le Roi!" ("Long live the King!" – Chorus, Clément, Marie, Guillot, Colette)

Act 2

- "A vous, belles maîtresses" ("To you, fair mistresses" – Chorus)
- "Voici le guet qui passe" ("Here is the watch on parade" – Ensemble)
- "Si, de la souveraineté" ("If, sovereignty" – Marie, Colette)
- "Ah! Colette, c’est toi?" ("Ah! Colette, it's you?" – Clément, Colette)
- "A table! auprès de moi" ("To the table! near me" – Marie, Clément, Colette)
- "Eh! que ne parliez-vous?" ("Eh! what do you say?" – Longueville)
- "Il faut agir adroitement " ("We must act deftly" – Ensemble)
- "Nous accourons, au lever du soleil" ("We flee, at sunrise" – Ensemble)

Act 3

- "Jour de liesse et de réjouissance" ("Day of jubilation and celebration" – Chorus, Louis, equerry)
- "En honneur de notre hyménée" ("In honour of our wedding" – Colette, Louis)
- "Elle m'aime" ("She loves me" – Longueville)
- Romance and trio (Marie, Longueville, Colette)
- "A ton amour simple et sincère" ("A simple and sincere love" – Clément)
- Finale III "Arrêtez! s'il s'agit d'être pendu" (Stop! If he is to be hanged" – Ensemble)

== Revivals and adaptations ==
La Basoche was revived at the Opéra-Comique up to the Second World War and given at least another 150 performances, with Jean Périer and André Baugé playing Clément Marot, and Lucien Fugère repeating the role of the duke. Messager himself conducted the 1900, 1902 and 1919 productions at the Opéra-Comique; later revivals were conducted by Gustave Cloëz and Albert Wolff. In 1908 the work entered the repertoire of the Théâtre de la Gaîté in Paris, the cast including Baugé, Edmée Favart and Fugère and was revived there in 1927. It was presented at the Théâtre de la Porte-Saint-Martin in 1934 under the management of Maurice Lehmann with Baugé and Yvonne Brothier.

La Basoche was given French-language productions in Brussels in 1890 and Geneva in 1891. It was translated into German and performed as Die zwei Könige on 19 October 1891 at the Stadttheater, Hamburg, and as Die Basoche on 29 October 1891 at the Friedrich-Wilhelm-Städtisches Theater in Berlin.

The opera was presented in English as The Basoche in London in 1891, in an English translation by Augustus Harris (dialogue) and Eugène Oudin (lyrics) at Richard D'Oyly Carte's Royal English Opera House. Carré and Messager were present at the opening night and took curtain calls along with the conductor, François Cellier. The London cast was: (Note: During the run, Clement was also played by John McCauley and Joseph O'Mara, the Duc by Wallace Brownlow, Marie by Esmé Lee, Collette by Carrie Donald, Jeanette by Stephanie Seymour, and Clarice by Annie Temple.)

- Clément Marot – Ben Davies
- Duc de Longueville – David Bispham
- Jehan L'Éveillé – Charles Kenningham
- Master Guillot – John Le Hay
- Roland – Charles Copland
- Louis XII – W. H. Burgon
- Chancellor of the Basoch – Frederick Bovill
- King's equerry – Wilson Sheffield
- Grand provost – Walter Uridge
- Nightwatchman – Godwin Hunt
- Jacquet – David Cowis
- Royal page – Carrington
- Marie d’Angleterre – Esther Pallise
- Colette – Lucile Hill
- Jeanette – Esmé Lee
- Clarice – Kate Vito

The piece received exceptionally high praise from the London critics but was not a great box-office success. It ran for 61 performances, from 3 November 1891 to 16 January 1892. (Note: The Basoche was to be given in alternation with the second run of Arthur Sullivan's Ivanhoe and several other operas. Ivanhoe played for only six more performances, and the other planned operas were not written; the Royal English Opera House closed. Sir Henry Wood, répétiteur at Carte's theatre, recalled in his autobiography, "If D'Oyly Carte had had a repertory of six operas instead of only one, I believe he would have established English opera in London for all time." Carte leased out the theatre for a year and then sold it to Sir Augustus Harris, the co-librettist of The Basoche.) When Carte withdrew the piece, several newspaper critics, including Bernard Shaw in The World, condemned the British public for its failure to support so outstanding a work. (Note: The London press speculated that the closure of The Basoche and several other major West End productions was brought on by the unfortunate combination of national mourning for the death of the Prince Albert Victor, Duke of Clarence and Avondale, second in line to the throne, and an influenza epidemic.) Carte's faith in the composer led to his producing Messager's Mirette in 1894.

An American version, in a new translation by Madeleine Lucette Ryley, with her husband J. H. Ryley as the Duke, was produced by the James C. Duff Opera Company at Chicago's Auditorium Theatre on 2 January 1893 and the Casino Theatre on 27 February 1893 for a two-week run on Broadway. Gustave Kerker conducted. The critic of The New York Times stated that "for the music, warm words of praise may be spoken", but thought the genre was "far too unfamiliar on the local stage" and Ryley ill-suited to the part, "not as funny as one could have wished."

More recently, the opera has been staged at Monte Carlo in 1954, with a cast including Denise Duval and Pierre Mollet, conducted by Albert Wolff, and at Enghien-les-Bains Casino in 1958 with Willy Clément, conducted by Jésus Etcheverry.

== Critical reception ==
Reviewing the original production, Les Annales du théâtre et de la musique commented that Carré's libretto was good enough to be presented as a straight play, without music, but that Messager's score lived up to it – "light and vivacious" – everything needed to maintain a place in the repertoire of the Opéra Comique. The critic in Le Ménestrel praised Carré's imagination, though finding an excess of fantasy and some loose construction in the piece; he thought Messager had composed a major score, of which the first act contained the finest music. In La Nouvelle Revue, the critic Louis Gallet praised the finesse, delicacy and spirit of the score, and hoped the success of the piece would encourage the Opéra-Comique to promote further comic operas, a genre that it had neglected of late. The London critics were outspoken in their praise of the work. The Era said, "The Basoche is more than a success; it is a triumph … the most artistic and beautiful comic opera the modern stage has witnessed for years". The Observer, like The Era and The Times, predicted an exceptionally long run for the work; its reviewer commented that the score showed Messager as "a master of his art – endowed with the gift of melody and guided by a refined taste". The Times thought the opera "a work of very great beauty and charm", though its reviewer teased Messager about a few conspicuously Wagnerian passages where "the influence of Die Meistersinger is felt to an extent that is almost absurd". The Daily Telegraph commented that the composer had a rare gift, and that "the connoisseur can hear La Basoche for the charm of its scholarship, and the average opera-goer can enjoy it for its tunefulness".

The composer Henry Février in his André Messager: Mon Maître, Mon Ami (1948) calls La Basoche "the last of the great nineteenth-century French comic operas" ("le dernier des grands opéras-comiques français du XIX siècle") and considers it of the greatest importance not only in Messager's career but in the history of French musical theatre. Gervase Hughes in his 1962 study of operetta considers the work to have a good claim to be the composer's masterpiece. In 1995 The Times's music critic, John Higgins, judged La Basoche to be "inspired" and – despite "a twaddly plot involving British royalty" – "one of Messager's most substantial pieces".

== Recordings and broadcasts ==
Various extracts were recorded during the 1920s and 30s (including some by Fugère). A complete performance of the score was broadcast by the BBC in 1930 using the English version by Harris and Oudin, with a cast headed by Maggie Teyte and Frank Titterton, conducted by Percy Pitt. A complete French radio broadcast of July 1960, with Nadine Sautereau, Camille Maurane, Irène Jaumillot and Louis Noguéra, conducted by Tony Aubin, was subsequently issued on CD. Extended excerpts were recorded in 1961, featuring Liliane Berton, Nicole Broissin, Henri Legay and Michel Dens, conducted by Jacques Pernoo.

== Notes, references and sources ==
=== Sources ===
- Carré, Albert (1900). La Basoche Libretto. Paris: Choudens. OCLC 630612873.
- Février, Henry (1948). André Messager: Mon Maître, Mon Ami (in French). Paris: Amiot-Dumont. OCLC 906458628.
- Hughes, Gervase (1962). Composers of Operetta. London: Macmillan. OCLC 460660877.
- Gänzl, Kurt (2001). The Encyclopedia of Musical Theatre. Vol. 1 (2nd ed.). New York: Schirmer Books. ISBN 978-0-02-865572-7.
- Lubbock, Mark; David Ewen (1963). The Complete Book of Light Opera. New York: ,: Appleton-Century-Crofts. OCLC 615550.
- Messager, André; Albert Carré (1890). La Basoche: Vocal score. Paris: Choudens. OCLC 758737877.
- Noël, Edouard; Edmond Stoullig (1891). Les Annales du théâtre et de la musique, 1890. Paris: Charpentier. OCLC 469004564.
- Shaw, Bernard (1981). Shaw's Music – The Complete Musical Criticism of Bernard Shaw, Volume II. Dan H. Laurence (ed). London: The Bodley Head. ISBN 978-0-370-31271-2.
- Stoullig, Edmond (1909). Les Annales du théâtre et de la Musique, 1908. Paris: G. Charpentier & E. Fasquelle. OCLC 459094401.
- Traubner, Richard (2004). Operetta: A Theatrical History (2nd ed.). London: Routledge. ISBN 978-1-135-88783-4.
- Wearing, J. P. (2014). The London Stage 1890-1899: A Calendar of Productions, Performers, and Personnel. Lanham: Rowman & Littlefield. ISBN 978-0-8108-9281-1.
- Wood, Henry J. (1938). My Life of Music. London: Victor Gollancz. OCLC 30533927.
