= Albert Millaud =

French journalist and writer (1844–1892)

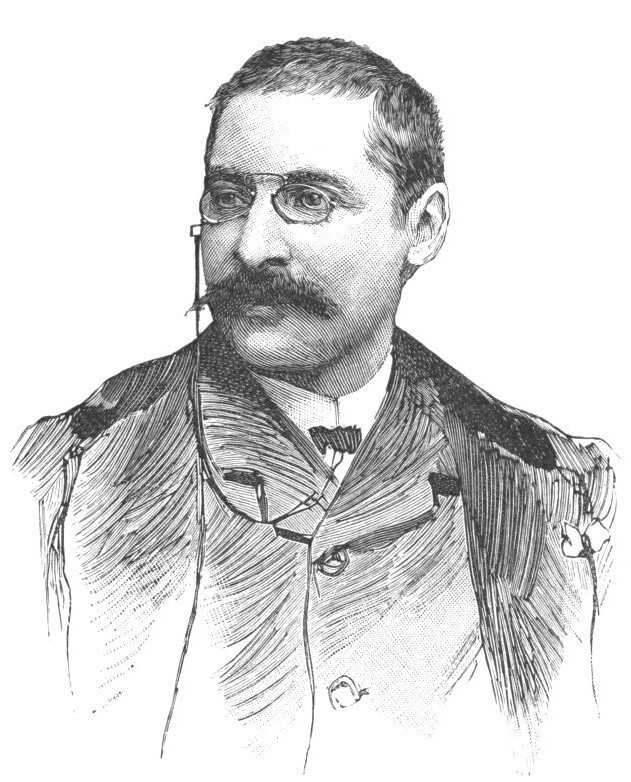
Albert Millaud

Albert Millaud was a French journalist, writer and stage author (Paris, 13 January 1844 – Paris, 23 October 1892).

== Life and career ==
He was the son of the banker Moïse Millaud, the founder of Le Petit Journal.

He studied law (obtaining his doctorate in 1866), but turned his energies to literature and in 1865 published a volume of poetry entitled Fantaisies de jeunesse.

Under the pseudonym Oronte, he wrote articles for La Gazette de Hollande and La Revue de poche which he founded with Abel d’Avrecourt.

For his daily articles in Le Figaro, where he covered parliamentary affairs, he also used the pseudonyms La Bruyère, Saint-Simon, Paul Hémery, Lafontaine and Baron Grimm.

Millaud's first play, written in 1872, was Le Péché véniel. He was the author of the libretto for several opérettes for Jacques Offenbach, Charles Lecocq and Hervé. He married the singer Anna Judic, for whom he wrote Lilli, Niniche, La Roussotte, La Femme à papa and most memorably Mam'zelle Nitouche (in collaboration with Henri Meilhac).

He became a chevalier de la Légion d'honneur in 1877.

== Works ==
=== Theatre ===
- 1872: Le Péché véniel, one-act verse play
- 1873: Plutus in collaboration with Gaston Jollivet (later an opéra comique, see below)
- 1877: La Farce de la femme muette, after Rabelais, first performed at the Théâtre de la Porte Saint-Martin
- 1877: Le Collier d'or, one-act verse play
- 1882: Lili, comédie-vaudeville in 3 acts, with Alfred Hennequin et Ernest Blum, first performed in Paris at the Théâtre des Variétés on 11 January 1882
- 1891: Le Fiacre 117, play in three acts, with Émile de Najac

=== Music ===
- 1873: La Quenouille de verre: opéra-bouffe en 3 actes, music by Grisart
- 1874: Madame l'archiduc, opéra-bouffe, in three acts, music by Jacques Offenbach
- 1875: La Créole, music by Jacques Offenbach
- 1875: Les Hannetons, revue de printemps in three acts, five tableaux (with Eugène Grangé), music by Jacques Offenbach
- 1875: Plutus, opéra comique in three acts, music by Charles Lecocq
- 1878: Niniche, comédie-vaudeville in three acts, with Alfred Hennequin, music by Marius Boullard, first performed at the Théâtre des Variétés on 15 February 1878
- 1879: La Femme à papa, comédie-opérette in three acts, with Alfred Hennequin, music by Hervé, first performed at the Théâtre des Variétés on 3 December 1879.
- 1881: La Roussotte, comédie-vaudeville in three acts and a prologue, music by Lecocq, Hervé, etc.
- 1883: Mam'zelle Nitouche, with Henri Meilhac, music by Hervé
- 1886: Egmont, drame-lyrique in four acts, with Albert Wolff, music by Gaston Salvayre

=== Literature ===
- 1865: Fantaisies de jeunesse - Librairie du Petit Journal
- 1866: Physiologies parisiennes under the pseudonym « La Bruyère ». 120 dessins de Caran d'Ache
- 1869-1872: Petite Némésis
- 1873: Voyage d’un fantaisiste : Vienne, le Danube, Constantinople
- 1876: Lettres du Baron Grimm : Souvenirs, Historiettes et Anecdotes parlementaires
- 1878: Les Petites Comédies de la politique
- La Comédie du jour sous la république athénienne - Illustrations de Caran d’Ache.
- Croquis parlementaire
