= Madame l'archiduc =

Opéra bouffe by Jacques Offenbach

Jacques Offenbach by Nadar, c. 1860s

Madame l’archiduc (French pronunciation: [madam laʁʃidyk]) is an opéra bouffe, or operetta in three acts, by Jacques Offenbach, with a French libretto by Albert Millaud first performed at the Bouffes-Parisiens (Salle Choiseul) in Paris on 31 October 1874.

After a slow start Madame l’Archiduc had an opening run of 100 performances. It was seen in Vienna in 1875 and London in 1876. Highlights of the score include the quartet in cod-English for the count, countess and young couple in Act 1, an ‘alphabet’ sextet for Marietta, Giletti and the conspirators in Act 2, and a polka for the arrival of the dragoons.

A 1963 radio recording conducted by Jean-Claude Hartemann, with Lina Dachary as Marieta, Raymond Amade as Fortunato, and Gaston Rey and Janette Levasseur as the count and countess, was issued in 1990 in the Gaîeté-Lyrique/Musidisc series of French light opera.

== Roles ==
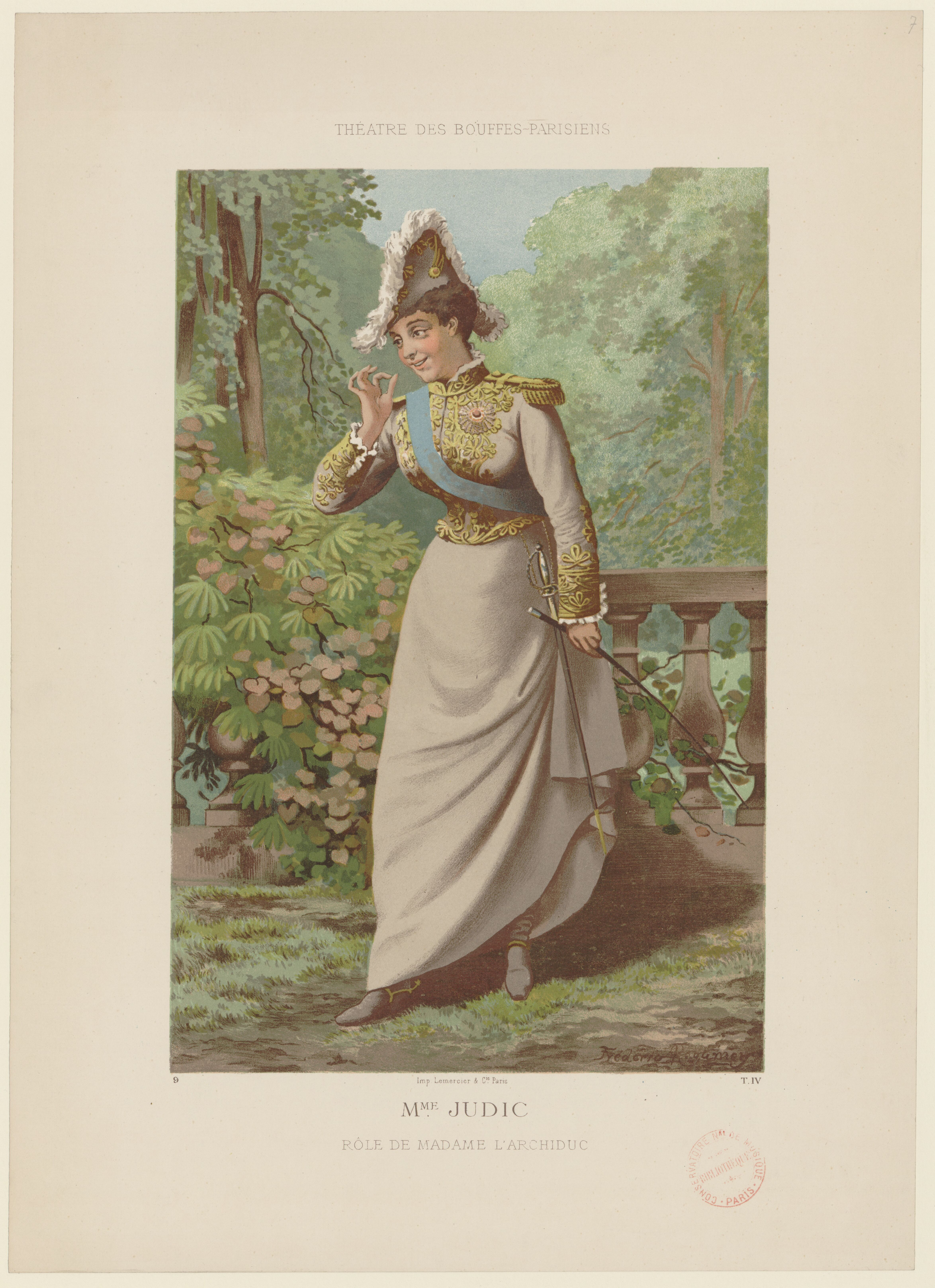
Anna Judic as Marietta

Role	Voice type	Premiere Cast, 31 October 1874
Marietta	mezzo-soprano	Anna Judic
Fortunato, captain of the archduke’s dragoons	soprano	Laurence Grivot
La Comtesse	soprano	Perret
Giacometta	soprano	Godin
The Archduke Ernest	tenor	Daubray
Giletti	tenor	Habay
Le Comte	baritone	Lucien Fugère
Innkeeper	tenor	Homerville
Riccardo	baritone	Desmonts
Beppino		Maxnère
Scoevola, a conspirator	tenor	Pierre Grivot
Coclès, a conspirator	baritone	Scipion
Thémistocle, a conspirator	tenor	Jean-Paul
Lycurgue, a conspirator	bass	Guyot
Piano-dolce, a minister	tenor	Courcelles
Andantino, a minister	tenor	Durand
Tutti-frutti, a minister	bass	Maxnère
Chi-lo-sa, a minister	bass	Rivet
Chorus: waiters, waitresses, dragoons, servants, ladies and gentlemen of the court

== Synopsis ==
Time: around 1820
Place: the duchy of Parma

=== Act 1 ===
Scene : an inn
Four conspirators meet to discuss the plot to do away with the archduke Ernest. Giletti and Marietta, servants at an inn are getting married. The count of Castelardo, who is in a conspiracy against the archduke, arrives at the inn with his young wife, trying to disguise themselves. When the hostelry is surrounded by the archduke’s dragoons, led by the short captain Fortunato, Giletti and Marietta are persuaded by the count to accept 10,000 ecus to pass themselves off as the count and countess of Castelardo. Arrested by Fortunato, the young couple are sent off to the Castelardo palace.

=== Act 2 ===
Scene : the palace of Castelardo
Giletti and Marietta meet the conspirators, who explain to Giletti that he must assassinate the archduke, but try to escape at his arrival. The archduke Ernest, who introduces himself as the most original of all archdukes, after condemning the plotters to death, is overwhelmed by the beauty of Marietta. He abdicates in her favour, but she then makes the conspirators her ministers – thus allowing his ministers in turn to become plotters.

=== Act 3 ===
Scene :
Fortunato must carry out the orders of the new ruler, who wishes to prevent Ernest from getting into her room incognito that night. The archduke is caught and only saves his skin by revealing his identity to Fortunato, who allows him to escape, only to then turns his attentions on the supposed countess. Giletti appears, being sent on his way to be ambassador to Naples, with a sealed letter setting out his credentials, which states "hold on to this idiot as long as possible". The archduke, who has now decided to conspire against Marietta, has met at the inn another beautiful girl – who turns out to be the real countess. He retakes his crown, gives 10,000 ecus to Giletti and Marietta (who use it to buy up the inn), and dispatches the count to Naples with the same, re-sealed, letter.
