= La créole =

Opéra comique by Jacques Offenbach

Jacques Offenbach by Nadar, c. 1860s

La créole is an opéra comique in three acts of 1875 with music by Jacques Offenbach. The French libretto was by Albert Millaud, with additional material by Henri Meilhac. It was one of three full-length stage works written almost simultaneously that year, the others being La Boulangère a des écus and Le Voyage dans la lune.

== Performance history ==
La créole was premiered at the Théâtre des Bouffes-Parisiens, Salle Choiseul, in Paris. The costumes were designed by Alfred Grévin. Although it ran for over sixty performances, it was rather coolly received due to its poor plot, and was not revived.

The work was also performed in German at the Theater an der Wien in Vienna and Berlin in 1876 (as Die Creolin), in Polish in Lemberg the same year, in London and Brussels in 1877, and in Spanish in Mexico in 1885. Adapted as The Commodore as a vehicle for Violet Cameron, the piece was seen in London and New York in 1886.

A revival at the Théâtre Marigny starring Josephine Baker in the title role was produced on 17 December 1934, with the libretto revamped by Albert Willemetz and some changes to the music.

More recently La créole was revived from 13 to 18 January 2009 at the Atelier Lyrique de Tourcoing, conducted by Jean-Claude Malgoire, and from November 2013 to January 2014 at the Espace Pierre Cardin by the not-for-profit association Tréteaux Lyriques.

French Radio performed the opera in 1961, conducted by Marcel Cariven. It is available on the Malibran label. Excerpts have appeared on the anthologies Offenbach au menu and Entre Nous.

== Roles ==
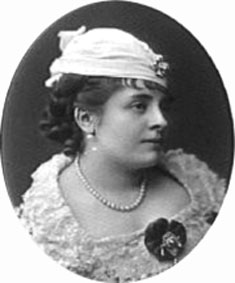
Anna Judic as Dora; photo by Nadar

Role	Voice type	Premiere cast, 3 November 1875, (Conductor: Jacques Offenbach)
Dora, daughter of the governor of Guadeloupe	mezzo-soprano	Anna Judic
René de Feuilles-Mortes	soprano	Anna Van Ghell
Antoinette	soprano	Luce Couturier
Maids of honour	soprano	Soll and Morena
Le Commandant de Feuilles-Mortes	baritone	Daubray
Monsieur de Frontignac	tenor	Henri Vanderjeught 'Cooper'
Saint-Chamas, officer on the commander’s ship	baritone	Lucien Fugère
Notaries	baritone	Homerville and Pescheux
Sailors, Women, Bridesmaids

== Synopsis ==
Time and place: 1685, La Rochelle

=== Act 1 ===
Just about to set off on a new voyage, the sea-captain Adhémar de Feuilles-Mortes plans to arrange the marriage of his ward Antoinette to his nephew René. Unfortunately Antoinette is not in love with René; her love is René's friend the young lawyer Frontignac. Equally, René, a musketeer travelling between one exploit and the next, is desperate to see again a Creole girl whom he met while he was on Guadeloupe. But in spite of this his uncle Adhémar insists. However the admiral summons the commander to sea, and no sooner is he out of port and sight – presumably for a couple of years – than Antoinette, in collusion with René, marries her sweetheart Frontignac.

=== Act 2 ===
Six months later, the commander returns from Guadeloupe with a new ward whom he intends for Frontignac. This new ward is Dora, the Creole whom René wanted to marry. So to avoid revealing the truth Antoinette and René pretend to be wed, while Frontignac pays court to the beautiful Creole. However, Frontignac allows himself to be caught in tête-à-tête with his wife, while René finally manages to convince Dora that she has not been deceived and he still loves her; she then swears her love for him. The commandant tries to join Frontignac and Dora but she refuses. Just then three canons sound, and a new order arrives for him to return to sea. He goes, taking all the young people with him, and all, including the notaries, set off.

=== Act 3 ===
On board the ship: the commandant has received a letter from René Duguay-Trouin which must only be opened at a certain point at sea. When the commandant has been lulled to sleep by a berceuse, the young people manage to get hold of the letter and only give it back to him when he agrees to allow René to wed Dora. With a new wedding contract signed, the situation ends to everyone's satisfaction.
