= Anna Judic =

French comic actress

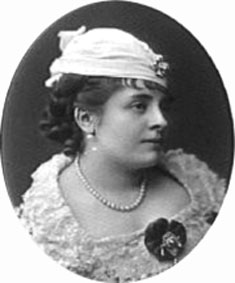
Anna Judic at the Bouffes-Parisiens

Anne Marie-Louise Damiens, stage name Anna Judic (18 July 1849, Semur-en-Auxois – 15 April 1911, Golfe-Juan) was a French comic actress.

== Life ==
Niece of Montigny (the director of the Gymnase), in 1866 she entered the Conservatoire de Paris in the class of François-Joseph Regnier, which she left the following year to make her debut at the Théâtre du Gymnase in Les Grandes Demoiselles, a one-act comedy by Edmond Gondinet. However, it was at the Eldorado that she first really became known, in a répertoire of "chansons légères" in which her apparent innocence allowed her to make ruder double-entendres than she might otherwise have done. Over time, she adopted "Judic", the name of her husband whom she had married before she was 17.

After the Franco-Prussian War and a spell at the Gaîté, where she was the lead in Le Roi Carotte, an "opéra-féerie" by Jacques Offenbach and Victorien Sardou, she entered the Bouffes-Parisiens where she had her first successes as a comic actress in the operettas of Léon Vasseur (La Timbale d'argent) and Offenbach (Madame l'archiduc, La Créole, Bagatelle, etc.). In 1872 she appeared in The Black Crook in a role written for her by Frederick Clay and Georges Jacobi and which ran for 310 performances. In 1876 she moved to the Théâtre des Variétés, whose star she would be for nearly 20 years. There she rediscovered Offenbach, playing the lead in his Le docteur Ox and reprising the mythical roles of Hortense Schneider: La Belle Hélène, La Grande-Duchesse de Gérolstein. In particular, she had a prolific collaboration with Hervé: Lili, Niniche, La Femme à papa, La Roussotte and his masterwork, Mam'zelle Nitouche (1883).

After a failed production of La Cosaque, she began travelling, appearing at the Menus-Plaisirs, the Eldorado and the Alcazar d'Été but never regaining the immense success of her debut roles. She returned to the Gymnase in mother-figure roles in works such as Le Bourgeon, Le Secret de Polichinelle and L'Âge difficile, to which she brought "une tendresse, une douceur et une bonhomie touchantes" ("a tenderness, a softness and a touching affability") before retiring to her native Burgundy. She appeared with Sarah Bernhardt in La Belle au Bois Dormant (Sleeping Beauty) to strong notices, in 1908.

She is buried at Montmartre.

Her lover was the journalist and author Albert Millaud.
