= Georges Hüe =

French composer (1858–1948)

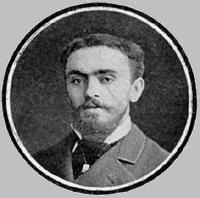
Hüe (c. 1895)

Georges Adolphe Hüe (6 May 1858 – 7 June 1948) was a French composer of classical music.

== Biography ==
Hüe was born in Versailles into a noted family of architects. His musical education included studies with Charles Gounod and César Franck. In 1879, he won the Prix de Rome with his cantata Médée. Upon his return to Paris, the Opéra Comique produced his first stage work, Les Pantins ("The Jumping Jacks"). This plotless, two-act set-piece for four singers doubling roles completely ignored fashionable realist trends of the day, and won high acclaim. For the next twenty years, his musical career went in other directions.

Hüe returned to the stage with his first full-length opera, Le Roi de Paris, a historical drama with a subplot about unrequited love. His follow-up opera was Titania. Stimulated by fantasy and Shakespeare, this work is noteworthy for its impressionistic woodland scenes for chorus and orchestra. In 1910, the Opéra produced Le Miracle, a grand five-act work combining the mythological story of Pygmalion with a religious miracle.

Hüe's most successful work with the public was Dans l'ombre de la cathédrale, whose topical plot was driven by the conflicting ideals of socialism and Catholicism. The opera was revived several times in the 1920s. Following his own travels to the Far East, he wrote Siang-Sin, a ballet-pantomime created for a Chinese spring festival in 1924. His final stage work was based on a fairy tale by Charles Perrault.

During his lifetime, Hüe wrote a broad range of other compositions, of which his choral works are most noteworthy. Some pieces for flute are occasionally performed, including Fantaisie for flute and orchestra (composed in 1913 for flute and piano and orchestrated in 1923), written for Adolphe Hennebains, professor of the Paris Conservatory.

Hüe's music met with limited success mainly because his style did not change with the times. However, he was an often inspired composer whose works garnered the admiration of several famous colleagues, including Claude Debussy and Gabriel Fauré.

He died in Paris in 1948.

== Operas ==
- Les Pantins, opéra comique (2 acts, E. Montagne), f.p. 28 December 1881, Opéra Comique (Favart), Paris. Sets by Jean-Baptiste Lavastre.
- Le Roi de Paris, opéra (3 acts, H. Bouchut), f.p. 26 April 1901, Opéra, Paris.
- Titania, opéra (3 acts, L. Gallet & A. Corneau), f.p. 20 January 1903, Opéra Comique (Favart), Paris.
- Le Miracle, opéra (5 acts, P.B. Gheusi & A. Mérane), f.p. 14 December 1910, Opéra, Paris.
- Dans l'ombre de la cathédrale, opéra (3 acts, M. Léna & H. Ferrare, after Blasco Ibanez), f.p. 7 December 1921, Opéra, Paris.
- Siang-Sin, ballet-pantomime (2 acts, P. Jobbé-Duval), f.p. 12 March 1924, Opéra, Paris.
- Riquet à la houppe ("Prince Riquet with the Tuft") comédie-musicale (3 acts, R. Gastambide, after Perrault), f.p. 17 December 1928, Opéra Comique (Favart), Paris.

== Bibliography ==
- Richard Langham Smith: "Hüe, Georges (Adolphe)", in: Stanley Sadie (ed.): The New Grove Dictionary of Opera, vol. 2 (London & New York: MacMillan, 1992); ISBN 0-935859-92-6.
