= Gaston Salvayre =

French composer

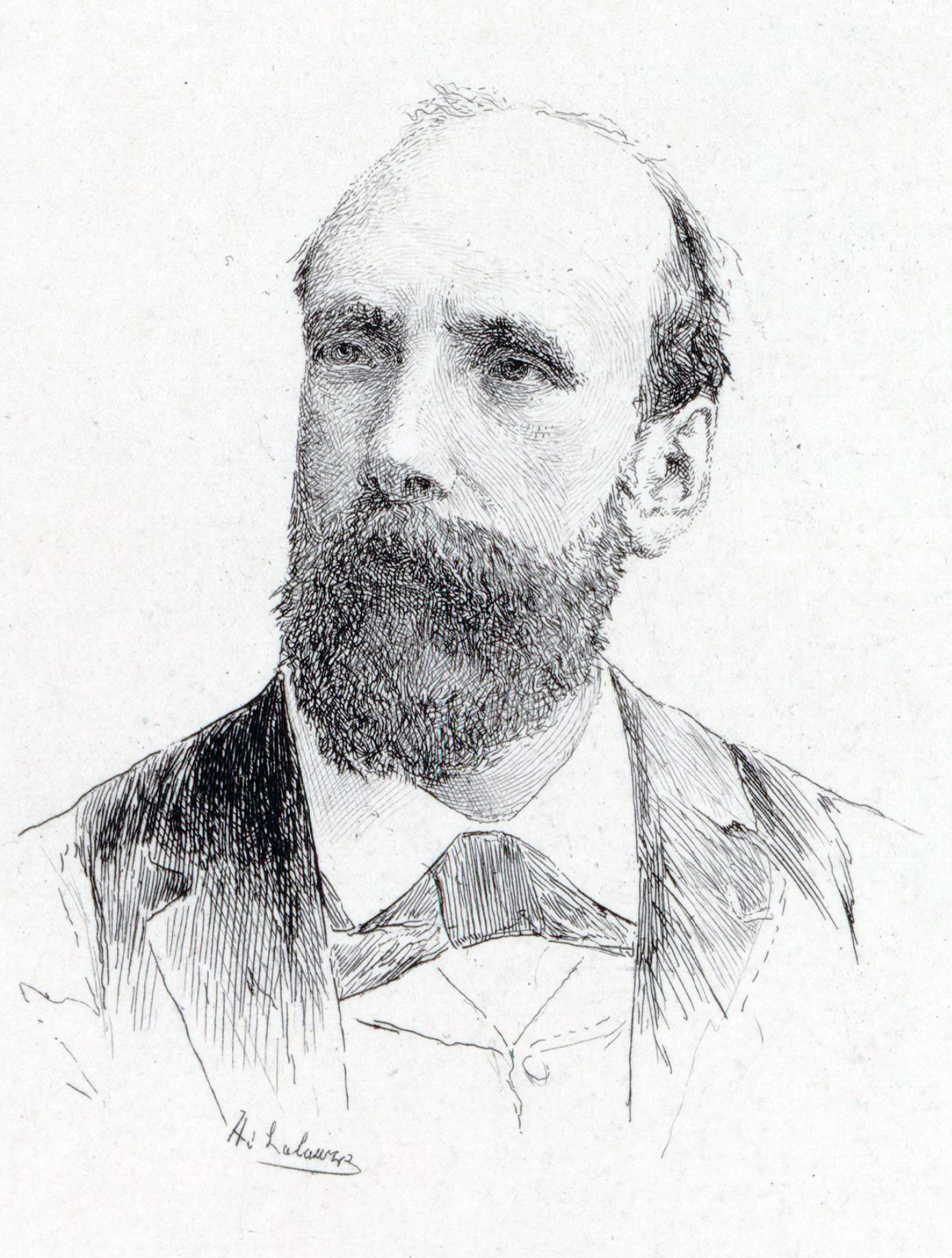
Gaston Salvayre

Gervais Bernard Gaston Salvayre (24 June 1847 – 17 May 1916) was a French composer and music critic who won the Prix de Rome for composition in 1872.

== Biography ==
Born in Toulouse, Salvayre attended the Toulouse Conservatory and then the Paris Conservatory, where he studied piano with Antoine François Marmontel, organ with François Benoist, harmony with François Bazin, and composition with Ambroise Thomas. He received a first prize in organ and competed five times unsuccessfully for the Prix de Rome in composition before winning the Premier Grand Prix in 1872 with the dramatic scene Calypso. In Rome he composed several pieces, which were presented in Paris: Ouverture symphonique and ballet music for Albert Grisar's opera Les Amours du diable in 1874, and La Résurrection (a "biblical symphony", in 1876; renamed La Vallée de Josaphat in 1882).

He became the chorus master of the Opéra Populaire at the Théâtre du Châtelet in 1874. For several years he was a music critic for the periodical Gil Blas. He became Chevalier of the Legion of Honour in 1880.

His grand opera La Dame de Monsoreau, with a libretto by Auguste Maquet based on the play by Maquet and Alexandre Dumas, was commissioned by the Paris Opera and premiered at the Palais Garnier on 30 January 1888. It was not very successful and was withdrawn after its eighth performance.

He died in Ramonville-Saint-Agne.

== Works ==
- 1872: Calypso, cantata, by Gaston Salvayre and Paul Hillemacher.
- 1877: Le Bravo, opera in 4 acts, libretto by Emile Blavet, premiered on 18 April 1877 at the Opéra-National-Lyrique (Paris) with Cécile Mézeray as Violetta Tiepolo
- 1877: Le Fandango, ballet-pantomime in 1 act, on a libretto by Louis-Alexandre Mérante, Henri Meilhac and Ludovic Halévy, Paris, Académie nationale de musique, 26 November 1877.
- ????: Songs: Aubades Toi, la beauté, toi la jeunesse - J'ai cherché le repos; Chanson mauresque, Les filles d'Afrique - Chansons diverses J'aime dans le rayon (poem also used by Tchaikovsky). Viens-tu pas ma belle, c'est l'heure - Réveil d'amour, on texts by Paul Collin.
- 1883: Richard III, grand opera in 4 acts, libretto by E. Blavet
- 1886: Egmont, lyrical drama in 4 acts, libretto by Albert Millaud and Albert Wolff, premiered in Paris, Théâtre de l'Opéra-Comique, 6 December 1886.
- 1888: La Dame de Monsoreau.
- 1897: Noël méridional : La Maisonnette, mélodie on a poem by Édouard Guinand.
- 1909: Solange, Opéra comique in 3 acts, libretto by Adolphe Aderer
