= Mam'zelle Nitouche =

1883 vaudeville-opérette by Hervé

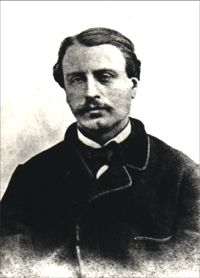
Hervé

Mam'zelle Nitouche is a vaudeville-opérette in three acts by Hervé. The libretto is by Henri Meilhac and Albert Millaud. This story of a respectable musician, transforming himself into a songwriter at night, is partly inspired by the life of the composer of the piece Hervé, who as Florimond Ronger, his real name, was the organist at the important church of Saint-Eustache, Paris by day and wrote the music for and starred in satirical, irreverent operettas under a stage name at night.

== Performance history ==
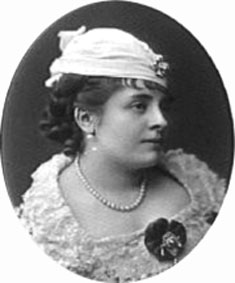
Anna Judic, who created the role of Mam'zelle Nitouche

It was first performed at the Théâtre des Variétés, Paris on 26 January 1883. The piece was a great success and the work remained in the repertoire of French theatres for many years. Mam'zelle Nitouche was presented by Palazzetto Bru Zane in a production by Olivier Py, who also appeared in the cast, on a nationwide tour of France from 2017 to 2019.

== Roles ==
Roles, voice types, and premiere cast
Role	Voice type	Premiere cast, 26 January 1883 (Conductor: Hervé)
Denise de Flavigny, called "Mam'zelle Nitouche"	soprano	Anna Judic
Major, comte de Château-Gibus	baritone	Christian
The director	bass	Édouard Georges
Célestin, an organist	baritone	Louis Baron
Fernand de Champlatreux, lieutenant	tenor	Henri Venderjench ('Cooper')
Loriot, a brigadier	tenor	Léonce
Mother Superior	contralto	Rosine Maurel
Corinne, an actress	mezzo-soprano	Beaumaine
Two officers		Gustave, Robert
'La tourière'		Mériani
Gimblette, an actress		Marguerite
Lydie, an actress		Caro
Students, dragoons, actors, etc.		

== Synopsis ==
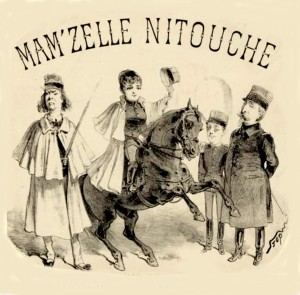
Illustration of the original production

Scene: Provincial France sometime in the 19th century.

=== Act 1 ===
Le couvent des Hirondelles (The convent of the swallows)

The organist of the convent, Célestin, leads a double life. During the day, he is a reserved and pious man who fulfills to general satisfaction his functions in this holy place. In the evening, under the pseudonym of Floridor, he goes to the Pontarcy theatre, where the operetta for which he has composed the music is being performed.

This morning, Célestin returns to the convent, all bruised. The Major of Chateau-Gibus, who is also the brother of the Mother Superior, surprised him in the act of making love to their common mistress, Corinne, the star of the operetta, and the Major kicked him in the back.

The Major came to visit his sister to announce a plan of marriage between Fernand de Champlatreux, one of his officers, and Denise de Flavigny, the most studious and obedient of the convent's boarders. The Mother Superior grants Fernand an interview with his beloved, provided he does not see her.

After her music lesson, Denise gets permission to stay a little longer with Célestin to work. The Mother Superior gives thanks for so much piety and assiduity. In reality Denise has discovered Célestin's secret. She stole the score and learned the operetta by heart. She knows all the roles. She is aware that the first performance takes place the same evening and she would like to go to the theatre. Célestin is amazed by this little Sainte-Nitouche ("holy hypocrite").

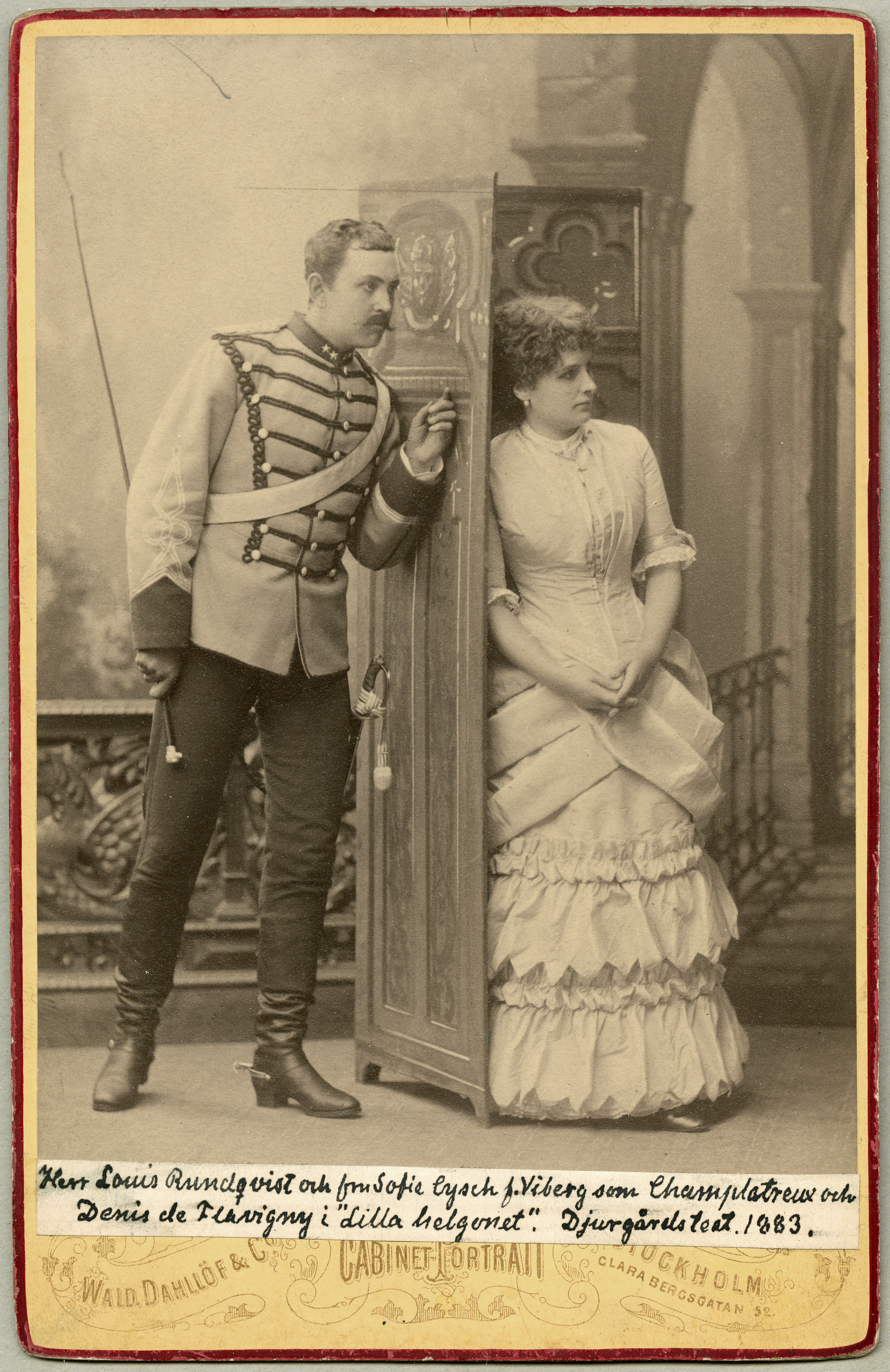
1883 production in Stockholm, Sweden

The interview between Fernand and Denise takes place soon after. The two young people are separated by a screen, and Fernand pretends to be an old inspector. Before leaving, Fernand gives a letter to the Mother Superior which asks for the immediate return of Denise to Paris for the purpose of her marriage. Without telling the girl why she is leaving, the Mother Superior tells her that her family is asking for her. She will leave the same day accompanied by Célestin. The composer is actually eager to attend the premiere of his operetta, not to act as Denise's chaperone. Denise finds the solution - she will wait quietly at the hotel while he is at the theatre! They take the next train to Paris.

=== Act 2 ===
The foyer of the Pontarcy theatre

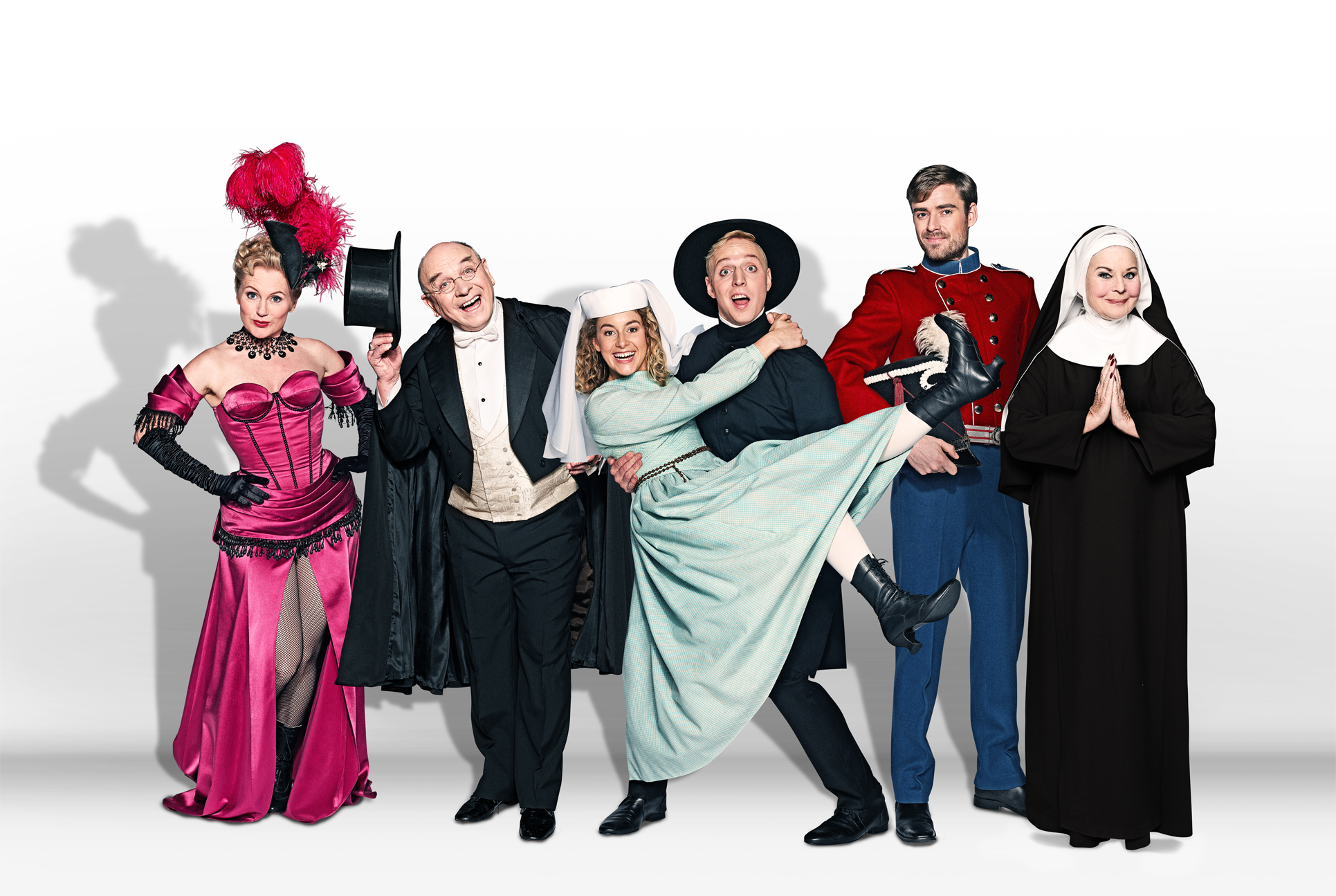
Cast of a 2016 production of Mam'zelle Nitouche in Copenhagen, Denmark

The first act was a triumph. During the intermission, the officers of the garrison flutter around the artists. Denise runs away from the hotel and looks for Floridor (Célestin) backstage at the theatre. She meets Fernand who is also visiting the theatre. She admits to knowing the whole score and lets him believe that she is an artist named Mam'zelle Nitouche. Corinne, the star, learns that Floridor (Célestin), one of her lovers, was seen in town with another woman. Furious, she refuses to appear in the second act. Denise, introduced by Fernand, saves the situation. Unbeknownst to Floridor, who has gone in search of Corinne, Denise sings the role and receives a triumphant ovation. It is only at the end of the performance that Célestin discovers the truth. Distraught, overwhelmed by events, closely followed by the Major who still wants to beat him up, the organist grabs Denise and they both escape out a window.

=== Act 3 ===
==== Scene 1 ====
The barracks

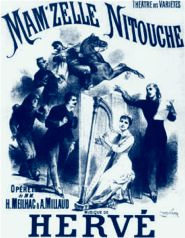
Illustration of original production

While escaping from the theatre, Floridor and Denise were intercepted by a patrol and taken to the barracks. They are recognized by the officers. They join the little party that is being given in honour of Fernand who is going Paris to get married. Fernand, who fell in love with Nitouche, decided to give up his marriage to Denise, whom he does not realise is actually the same person. On her side Denise loves Fernand. They do not have time to admit their mutual love, for the Major arrives in a fury, and interrupts the party. He takes Célestin for a reservist and shears his hair. Denise (Nitouche), who had been hiding in the back, returns dressed as a dragoon. The Major, who is fooled for a moment, soon suspects that it is a woman. Wanting to check a little closer, he gets a hard slap across the face from Denise. Taking advantage of the confusion, Célestin and Denise escape and return to the convent by climbing the wall.

==== Scene 2 ====
The convent

To justify their return, Denise says that by questioning Célestin skillfully, she learned that he wanted to marry her. Preferring to become a nun and live in chastity, she begged the organist not to press his suit and he has kindly brought her back to the convent. The Superior can not thwart such a sincere vocation. She will write to Denise's parents. However the Major enters and tells his sister the Mother Superior that Fernand is giving up getting married in order to look for a young artist named Nitouche with whom he has fallen in love. Denise, understanding that Fernand is the young man destined for her, asks permission to speak to him - behind the screen- in an attempt to change his mind.

She succeeds so well that a few moments later, they are in each other's arms. "It is out of pure love that I marry Fernand", Denise tells the Mother Superior who is always in admiration of this gem of piety. The Major is less naive. He recognized the two fugitives very well. He forgives Mam'zelle Nitouche easily, but also extends this forgiveness to Célestin, because Corinne convinced him (falsely) that there was nothing between Floridor and her.

== Title ==
Mam'zelle Nitouche can loosely be translated as Little Miss Hypocrite; the title is derived from the French expression "sainte nitouche" (literally "(female) Saint Wouldn't-Touch-It") for a female hypocrite. Mam'zelle is a graphic form or bastardisation of "mademoiselle", French for "miss".

== Films ==
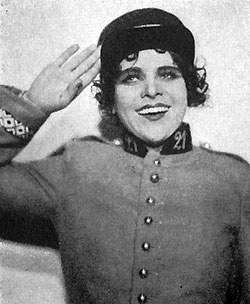
Swedish soprano Helga Görlin in Mam'zelle Nitouche c1930.

Mam'zelle Nitouche has been the subject of a number of films:

- a 1912 Italian silent short film Santarellina, directed by Mario Caserini
- a 1918 Hungarian silent film Nebántsvirág, directed by Cornelius Hintner
- a 1923 Italian silent film Santarellina, directed by Eugenio Perego
- a 1931 French film Mam'zelle Nitouche, directed by Marc Allégret, with Raimu as Célestin and Jean Renoir in a minor role
- a 1931 German film Mamsell Nitouche, directed by Karel Lamač (German version of the above)
- a 1944 Swedish film Lilla helgonet, directed by Weyler Hildebrand
- a 1944 Italian film Il diavolo va in collegio, directed by Jean Boyer
- a 1946 Argentine film Mosquita muerta, directed by Luis César Amadori
- a 1954 French film Mam'zelle Nitouche, directed by Yves Allégret, starring Fernandel
- a 1963 Danish film Frøken Nitouche, directed by Annelise Reenberg
- a 1976 Soviet film Heavenly Swallows, directed by Leonid Kvinikhidze
