= Marcel Claudel =

Belgian operatic tenor

Marcel Claudel (1900-1981; Courcelles, Hainaut) was a Belgian operatic tenor. He debuted at La Monnaie as Wilhelm Meister in Ambroise Thomas' Mignon in 1922. During the 1960s he taught at the Conservatoire of Mons. Musique en Wallonie issued a disc of his recordings in 2003.
