= Lucien Fugère =

French opera singer (1848–1935)

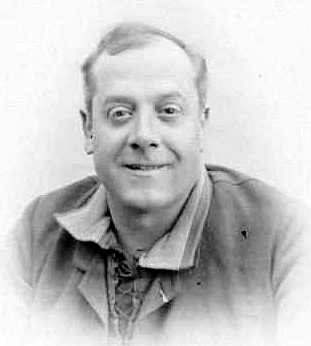
Lucien Fugère, 1890

Lucien Fugère (French pronunciation: [lysjɛ̃ fyʒɛʁ]; 22 July 1848, Paris – 15 January 1935, Paris) was a French baritone, particularly associated with the French repertory and Mozart roles. He enjoyed an exceptionally long career, singing into his 80s.

== Life and career ==
Fugère's father died when he was 6, and at the age of 12 he was apprenticed as a mason, working on repairing statues and gargoyles of Notre Dame with his brothers. He also joined, and got noticed, in the singing societies popular in Paris at that time.

Fugère was working as a jewellery salesman when he decided to try his luck at a career in music. After taking private voice lessons (he was refused by the Paris Conservatory), he made his debut as a chansonnier at the Bataclan in 1870. He then made his debut in operetta at the Théâtre des Bouffes Parisiens, in 1874, in La branche cassée by Serpette. In addition Fugère sang in La Boite au lait, Madame l'archiduc, Le Moulin du Vent-Galant and La créole at the Bouffes.

The turning point of his career came in 1877, when he made his debut at the Opéra-Comique as Jean, in Les noces de Jeannette by Victor Massé. He was to perform there regularly until 1920, creating roles in more than 30 operas, notably the father in Louise by Gustave Charpentier, Fritelli in Le roi malgré lui by Emmanuel Chabrier, and for Jules Massenet, Pandolfe in Cendrillon, the Devil in Grisélidis, des Grieux in Le portrait de Manon, Sancho in Don Quichotte, Boniface in Le jongleur de Notre-Dame, and for André Messager, Maitre André in Fortunio, Buvat in Le chevalier d'Harmental, and le Duc de Longueville in La Basoche. In total he sang in over 100 roles including Mozart's Figaro, Leporello, Papageno, Verdi's Falstaff, and also appeared at the Gaîté-Lyrique from 1908 until 1919.

Two Chabrier songs are dedicated to Fugère: Sommation irrespectueuse and Pastorales des cochons roses, giving the premiere of the latter in 1890.

In 1898, having sung at the re-opening of the Salle Favart, Fugère was presented to President Faure from whom he received the Cross of the Chevalier of the Légion d'Honneur.

Fugère sang le Duc de Longueville one last time at the Opéra-Comique in 1929, and his final performance on stage was as Rossini's Bartolo, at the Trianon-Lyrique theater, in 1933, at the age of 85.

His voice was described as "a basse chantante of easy baritone range, with ringing clarity in the lower register and skilful refinement in the upper". He recorded for Zonophone in 1902, and then for Columbia in 1928–30 (re-issued by Symposium).

An outstanding singing-actor and a fine musician, Lucien Fugère enjoyed one of the longest operatic careers of all time. When asked about his longevity, he said to an interviewer, "If a man doesn't sing well by the time he is 83, when will he, I'd like to know!" He has been compared to the Swiss tenor Hugues Cuénod, who made his debut at the Metropolitan Opera at the age of 84.

He became a singing teacher at the Paris Conservatoire, was a member of Comité de l'Association des Artistes dramatiques, and a member of the 'Commission départementales des Sites et Monuments naturels de caractère artistique de la Charente-Inférieure'.

Lucien's brother Paul Fugère (1851 – c. 1920) was also an opera singer.

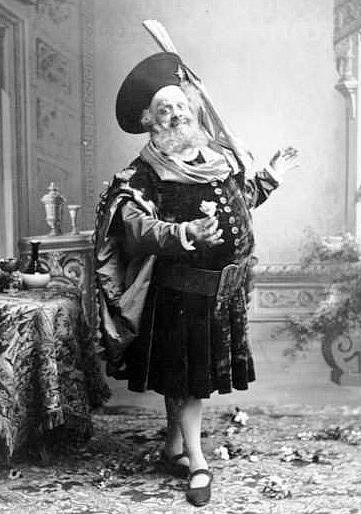
As Sir John Falstaff in Verdi's Falstaff

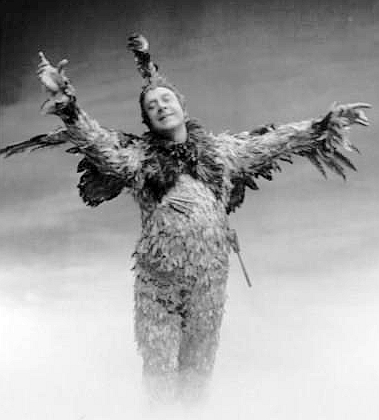
As Papageno in Mozart's Magic Flute

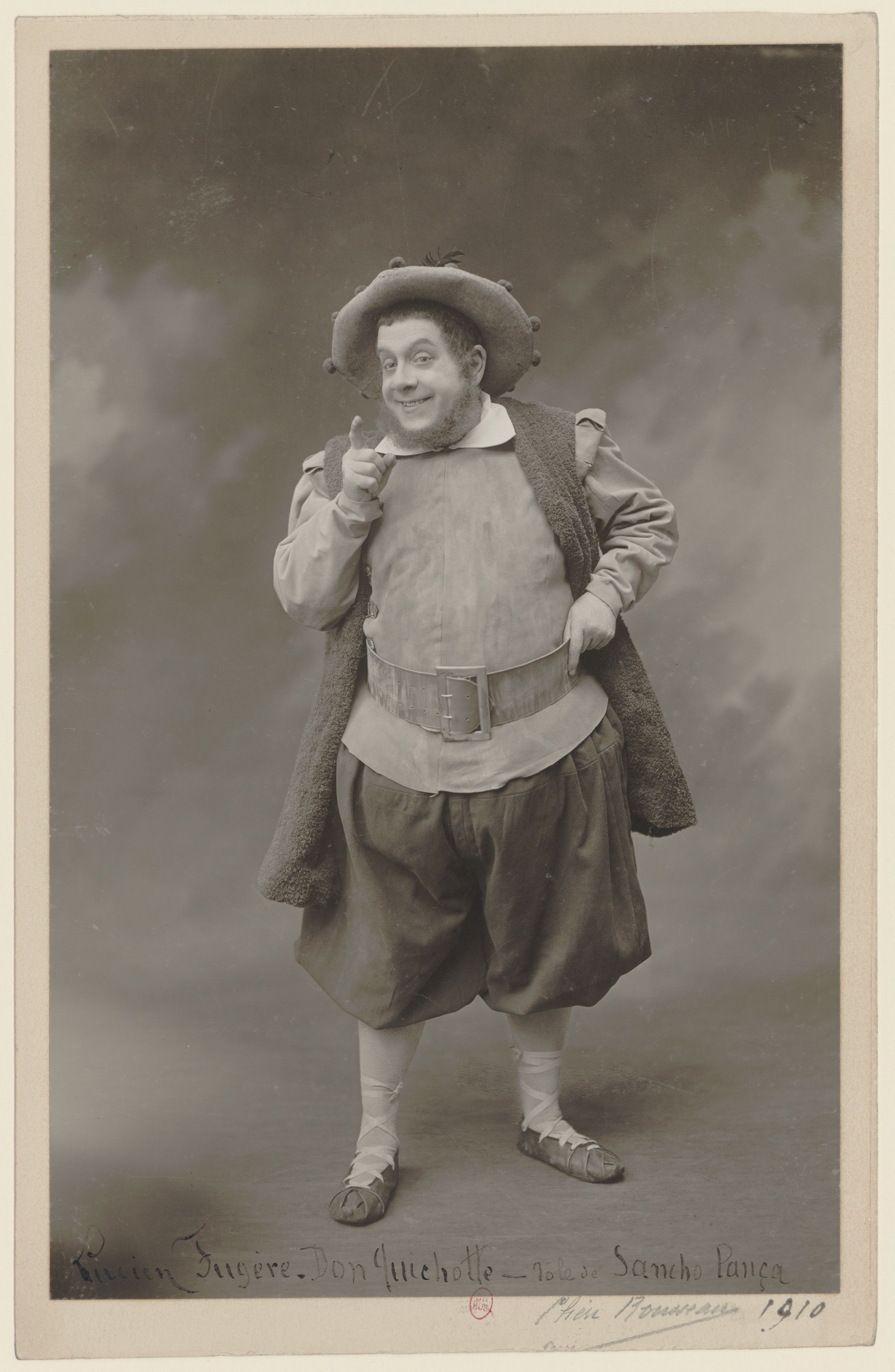
As Sancho Pança in Massenet's Don Quichotte

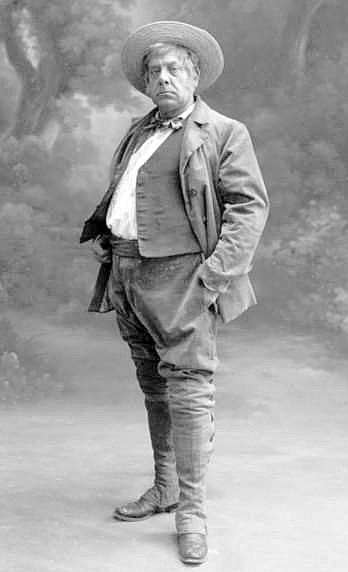
As Maître Vigord in Isidore de Lara's Sanga
