= Basoche =

Parisian guild of law clerks

The Basoche was the guild of legal clerks of the Paris court system under the pre-revolutionary French monarchy, from among whom legal representatives (procureurs) were recruited. It was an ancient institution whose roots are unclear. The word itself derives from the Latin basilica, the kind of building in which the legal trade was practiced in Ancient Rome and the Middle Ages.

It dated (Note: Esmein, 1911, writes "no doubt", suggesting this is a presumed origin) from the time when the profession of procureur (procurator, advocate or legal representative) was still free in the sense that persons rendering that service to others when so permitted by the law were not yet public and ministerial officers. For this purpose there was established near each important juridical centre a group of clerks, that is to say, of men skilled in law (or reputed to be so), who at first would probably fill indifferently the rôles of representative or advocate. Such was the origin of the Basoche of the parlement of Paris; which naturally formed itself into a guild, like other professions and trades in the Middle Ages.

But this organization eventually became disintegrated, dividing up into more specialized bodies: that of the advocates, whose history then begins; and that of legal representatives, whose profession was regularized in 1344, and speedily became a saleable charge. The remnant of the original clerks constituted the new Basoche, which thenceforward consisted only of those who worked as clerks for the procureurs, the richer ones among them aspiring themselves to attain the position of procureur. They all, however, retained some traces of their original conditions. "They are admitted," writes an 18th-century author, "to plead before M. le lieutenant civil sur les réferés (Note: A procedure for obtaining a provisional judgment on urgent cases) and before M. le juge auditeur; so that the procureurs of these days are but the former clerks of the Basoche, admitted to officiate in important cases in preference to other clerks and to their exclusion."

From its ancient past the Basoche had also preserved certain picturesque forms and names. It was called the "kingdom of the Basoche," and for a long time its chief, elected each year in general assembly, bore the title of "king." This he had to give up towards the end of the 16th century, by order, it is said, of Henry III, and was thenceforth called the "chancellor." At this time it is said that the order included 6,000 clerks. The Basoche had besides its maîtres des requêtes, a grand court-crier, a referendary, an advocate-general, a procureur-général, a chaplain, etc. In early days, and until the first half of the 16th century, it was organized in companies in a military manner and held periodical reviews or parades (montres), sometimes taking up arms in the king's service in time of war. Of this there survived later only an annual cavalcade, when the members of the Basoche went to the royal forest of Bondy to cut the maypole, which they afterwards set up in the courtyard of the Palais de Justice, to the sound of tambourines and trumpets. We hear also of satirical and literary entertainments given by clerks of the Palais de Justice, and of the moralities played by them in public, which form an important element in the history of the national theatre; but at the end of the 16th century these performances were restricted to the great hall of the Palais.

To the last the Basoche retained two principal prerogatives. (1) In order to be recognized as a qualified procureur it was necessary to have gone through one's "stage" in the Basoche, to have been entered by name for ten years on its register. It was not sufficient to have been merely clerk to a procureur during the period and to have been registered at his office. This rule was the occasion of frequent conflicts during the 17th and 18th centuries between the members of the Basoche and the procureurs, and on the whole, despite certain decisions favouring the latter, the parlement maintained the rights of the Basoche. Opinion was favourable to it because the certificats de complaisance issued by the procureurs were dreaded. These certificates held good, moreover, in places where there was no Basoche. (2) The Basoche had judiciary powers recognized by the law. It had disciplinary jurisdiction over its members and decided personal actions in civil law brought by one clerk against another or by an outsider against a clerk. The judgment, at any rate if delivered by a maître des requêtes, was authoritative, and could only be contested by a civil petition before the ancient council of the Basoche.

The Châtelet of Paris had its special basoche, which claimed to be older even than that of the Palais de Justice, and there was contention between them as to certain rights. The clerks of the procureurs at the cour des comptes of Paris had their own Basoche of great antiquity, called the "empire de Galilée." The Basoche of the Palais de Justice had in its ancient days the right to create provostships in localities within the jurisdiction of the parlement of Paris, and thus there sprang up a certain number of local basoches. Others were independent in origin; among such being the "regency" of Rouen and the Basoche of the Parlement of Toulouse.

Its powers faded over the years and towards the end, it had little genuine authority. It was abolished in the French Revolution by the general decree of February 13, 1791. In modern French, basoche is a pejorative term for the legal trade as a whole.
