= Charles Grisart =

French operatic composer (1837–1904)

Charles Jean Baptiste Grisart (29 September 1837 – 11 March 1904) was a French operatic composer.

== Biography ==
Charles Jean Baptiste Grisart was born on 29 September 1837 in Paris, France. He died on 11 March 1904 in Compiègne.

He composed operas.

== Operas ==
- La Quenouille de verre (1873)
- Les Trois Margots (1877)
- Le Pont d'Avignon (1878)
- Le Petit abbé (1879)
- Les Poupées de l'Infante (1881)
- Le Bossu (1888)
- Le Petit Bois (1893)
- Voilà le roi! (1894)
