= Gabriel Soulacroix =

French operatic baritone

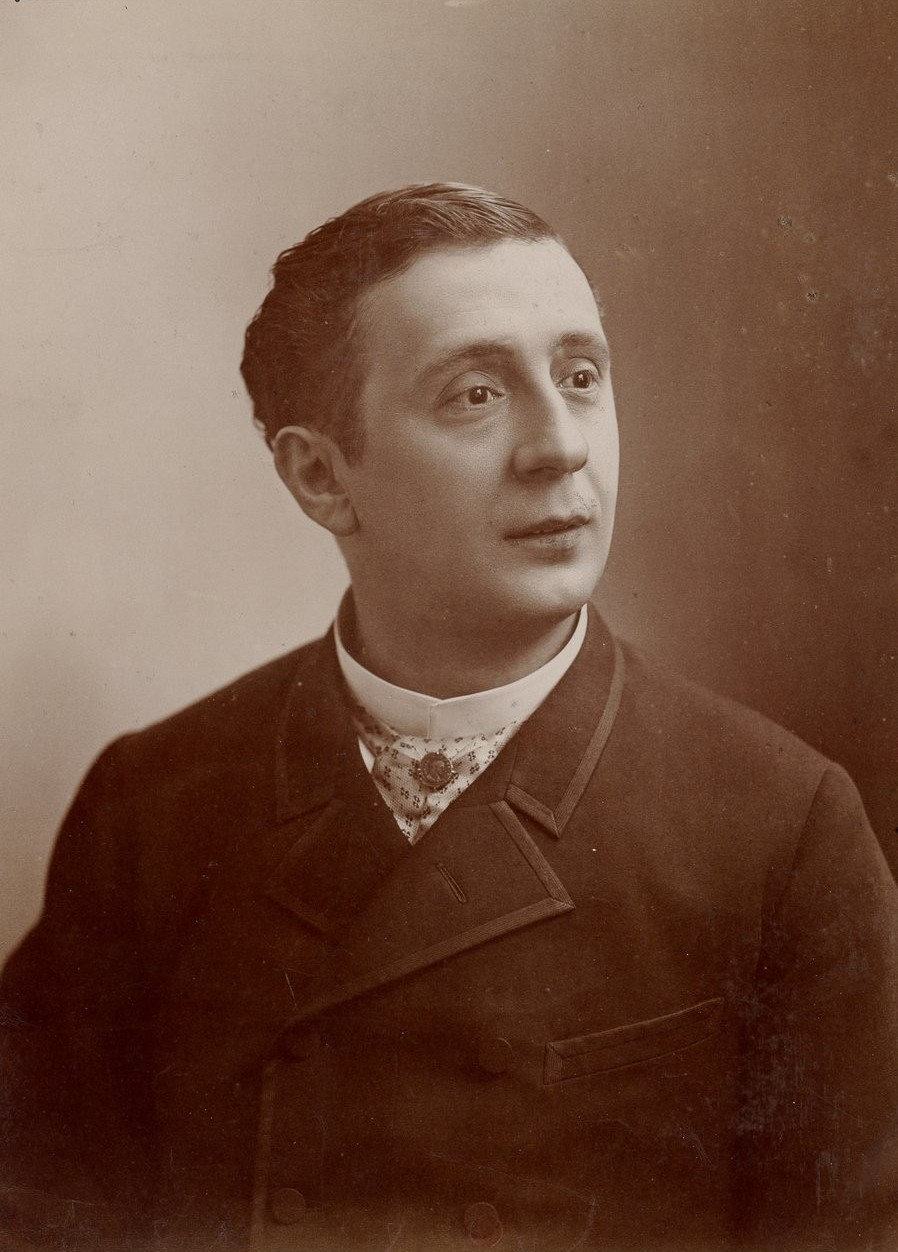
Gabriel-Valentin Soulacroix

Gabriel-Valentin Soulacroix (11 December 1853, in Fumel – 16 August 1905, in Paris) was a French operatic baritone. He studied at Toulouse, where he won four first prizes, and then in Paris.

== Career ==
Making his debut in Mireille on 5 September 1878, Soulacroix appeared regularly at La Monnaie, Brussels, including in some local operatic premieres.

His repertoire in Brussels included Le timbre d'argent by Camille Saint-Saëns (10 February 1879, playing the doctor), L'orage, an opéra-comique by Jean Urich (2 May 1879, Julien), The magic flute in French, (January to April 1880, Papageno), La Bernoise, an opéra comique by Emile Mathieu (1 April 1880, André), Le capitaine Raymond, an opéra comique by Jean-Baptiste Colyns (8 April 1881, Le comte de Guitaut), Jean de Nivelle by Léo Delibes (28 November 1882, Le comte de Charolais), Le panache blanc, an opéra comique by Philippe Flon (15 February 1884), Manon (15 March 1884, Lescaut), Le trésor, an opéra-comique by Charles Edouard Lefebvre (15 December 1884, Le duc Jean), Joli Gilles by Ferdinand Poise (7 February 1885, title role), and The Mastersingers of Nuremberg in French (7 March 1885, Sixtus Beckmesser).

Soulacroix joined the Opéra-Comique company in 1885, his first appearance being as Bellamy in Les dragons de Villars on 25 September 1885. He sang Ford in the 1894 production of Falstaff, as well as Alfio (Cavalleria rusticana), Ourrias (Mireille), Schaunard (La Boheme) and Figaro (The Barber of Seville). He was on-stage singing Laerte in Mignon the night of the fire at the Salle Favart on 25 May 1887, and later received a médaille de sauvetage. In December 1899 he added Oreste to his repertoire, in a production of Iphigénie en Tauride at the Théâtre de la Renaissance.

At the Covent Garden in London, he sang the roles of Pedrillo, Escamillo, Figaro (Rossini), Alfio, Mercutio and Beckmesser. In addition, he was seen in a wide range of parts regularly at Monte Carlo from 1889 to 1904, including the title role in Zampa and Iago in Otello. His career was ended prematurely by his sudden death in middle-age.

== Recordings ==
Early cylinder and disc recordings by Soulacroix include arias from Rip, Richard Cœur-de-Lion, La Favorite, Hérodiade, Si j’étais roi and Carmen, as well as from roles which he created: "A ton amour simple et sincère" and "Quand tu connaîtras Colette" from La Basoche, and the 'Air du prieur' from Le jongleur de Notre-Dame.

Soulacroix recorded a great deal for Pathé, Odéon and the Gramophone Company from 1899 to his death. Some of these recordings have been re-issued on CD. According to Michael Scott in The Record of Singing, they show that "he possessed a smooth, elegant, lyrical voice and an exemplary bel canto technique".

== Roles created ==
- Ferdinand in Egmont (Salvayre,1886)
- Plutus (Lecocq, 1886)
- Gabriel in Pilote (Urich, 1890)
- Clément Marot in La Basoche (Messager, 1890)
- Treocrite in Aréthuse (De Montgomery, 1894)
- Title role in Panurge (Planquette, 1895)
- Myrrhon in Messeline (de Lara, 1899)
- Prior in Le jongleur de Notre-Dame (Massenet, 1902)
