= Jésus Etcheverry =

French conductor (1911–1988)

Jésus Etcheverry (14 November 1911 in Bordeaux – 12 January 1988 in Paris) was a French operatic conductor.

He began studying the violin while still very young, and played with diverse small orchestras to pay for his tuitions. At age 20, he was engaged by the Symphonic Orchestra in Casablanca, as first violinist, and shortly after began teaching at the Music Conservatory there. He spent the war years in Morocco, and began conducting in an improvised opera season, organised by French expatriate opera singers. The success was such that once the war over, he returned to France and became musical director at the opera house in Nancy, a post he held from 1947 until 1957. He also conducted the summer opera seasons in Luchon, Enghien and Angoulême.

In 1957, he was named first conductor at the Opéra-Comique, where he remained until 1972. Beginning in 1966, he also conducted at the Palais Garnier. He became musical director of the opera house in Nantes in 1972, and then took the musical direction of the opera house in Nancy in 1977.

Although his career was essentially spent in France, he did make guest appearances abroad, notably in London, Lausanne and Barcelona, where he was much appreciated in the French repertory.

Among the premieres he conducted are; Marcel Landowski's Le Feu (1956), Georges Delerue's Le chevalier de neige (1957), and Jacques Chailley's Thyl de Flandres (1963).

He left recordings of Gounod's Mireille, and Massenet's Thais and Werther, and provided accompaniments to vocal recitals.

== Sources ==
- Le dictionnaire des interprètes, Alain Pâris, (Éditions Robert Laffont, 1989) ISBN 2-221-06660-X
