= Jean-Vital Jammes =

French opera singer (1825–1893)

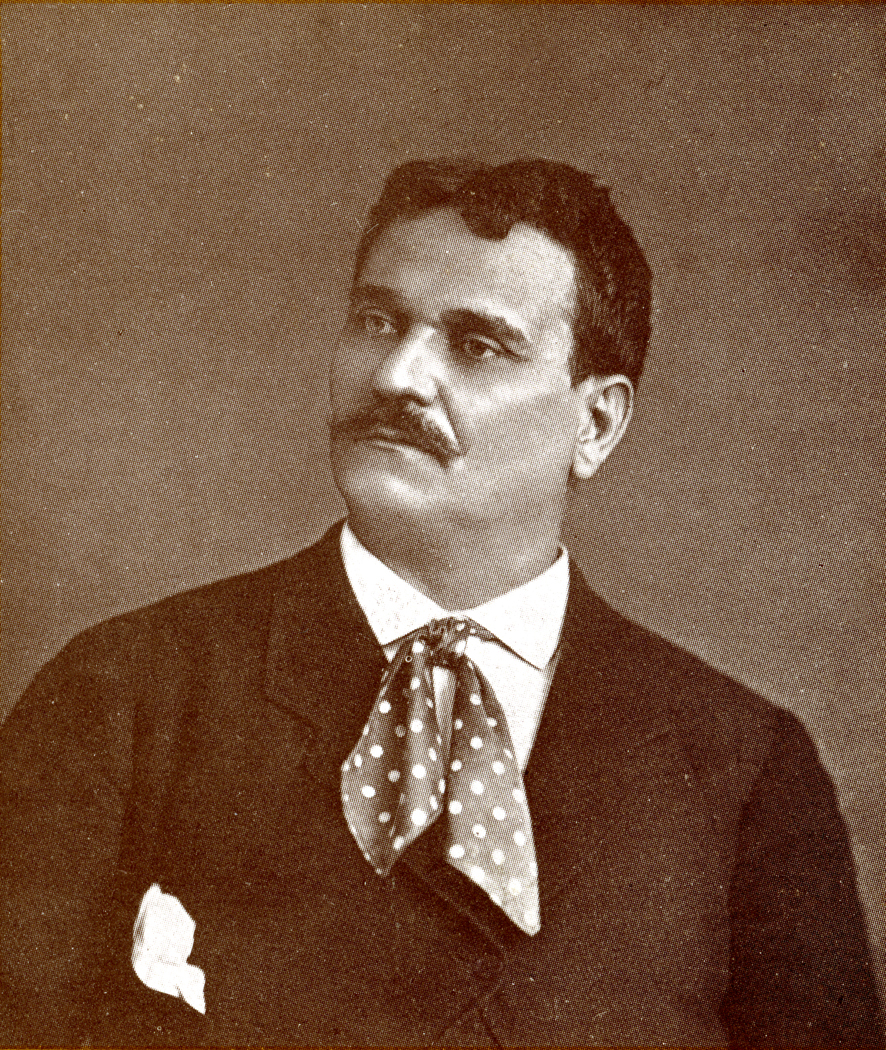
- Jean-Vital Jammes ("Ismaël") c. 1873
- Born: 28 April 1825; Le Passage, Lot-et-Garonne, France
- Died: 13 June 1893 (aged 68)
- Other name: Ismaël
- Occupation: opera singer
- Spouses: Alceste Cœuriot (m. 1852; div. 1885) Marie Garcin (m. 1886)

Jean-Vital Jammes (known by the stage name Ismaël) (28 April 1825 – 13 June 1893) was a French opera singer. During a stage career spanning 40 years, he created many leading baritone roles, including Zurga in Bizet's Les pêcheurs de perles and Ourrias in Gounod's Mireille. Born in Le Passage d'Agen near the town of Agen, he was largely self-taught and made his stage debut in 1841 at the age of 16. After singing in several provincial theatres, he was engaged by the Théâtre Lyrique in Paris and later by the Opéra-Comique. Following his retirement from the stage, Ismaël lived in Marseille where he died at the age of 68.

== Biography ==
=== Early life and career ===
Ismaël was born Jean-Vital Jammes, the son of an illiterate tailor in Le Passage near the town of Agen. He showed an early interest in singing and as a teenager developed a beautiful baritone voice. However, his family were too poor to afford any kind of music lessons for him, and at the age of sixteen he left home to earn a living as a street singer, working his way on foot to Bordeaux and then Nantes. At Nantes, he was taken on as a chorister at the opera house during the 1842-1843 season and before his 17th birthday achieved local success when he stepped in at the last minute to sing the role of Max in a production of Adam's Le chalet. He then set off for Paris hoping to further his training as a singer, but he was virtually illiterate and was refused admittance to the Paris Conservatoire. Instead, he taught himself to read and write and took a few singing lessons, although it is not clear who the teacher was. He worked largely on his own to learn the music of the major baritone roles of his day and managed to secure a position singing baritone and bass roles in a small opera house at Verviers in Belgium. He soon returned to France and after performing in several small provincial theatres as well as the Opéra de Marseille, where he appeared each season between 1854 and 1860, he was engaged on a permanent contract by the Opéra de Rouen. He appeared there with great success in a series of leading roles between 1862 and 1863 and came to the attention of the impresario Léon Carvalho.

=== On the Paris stage ===
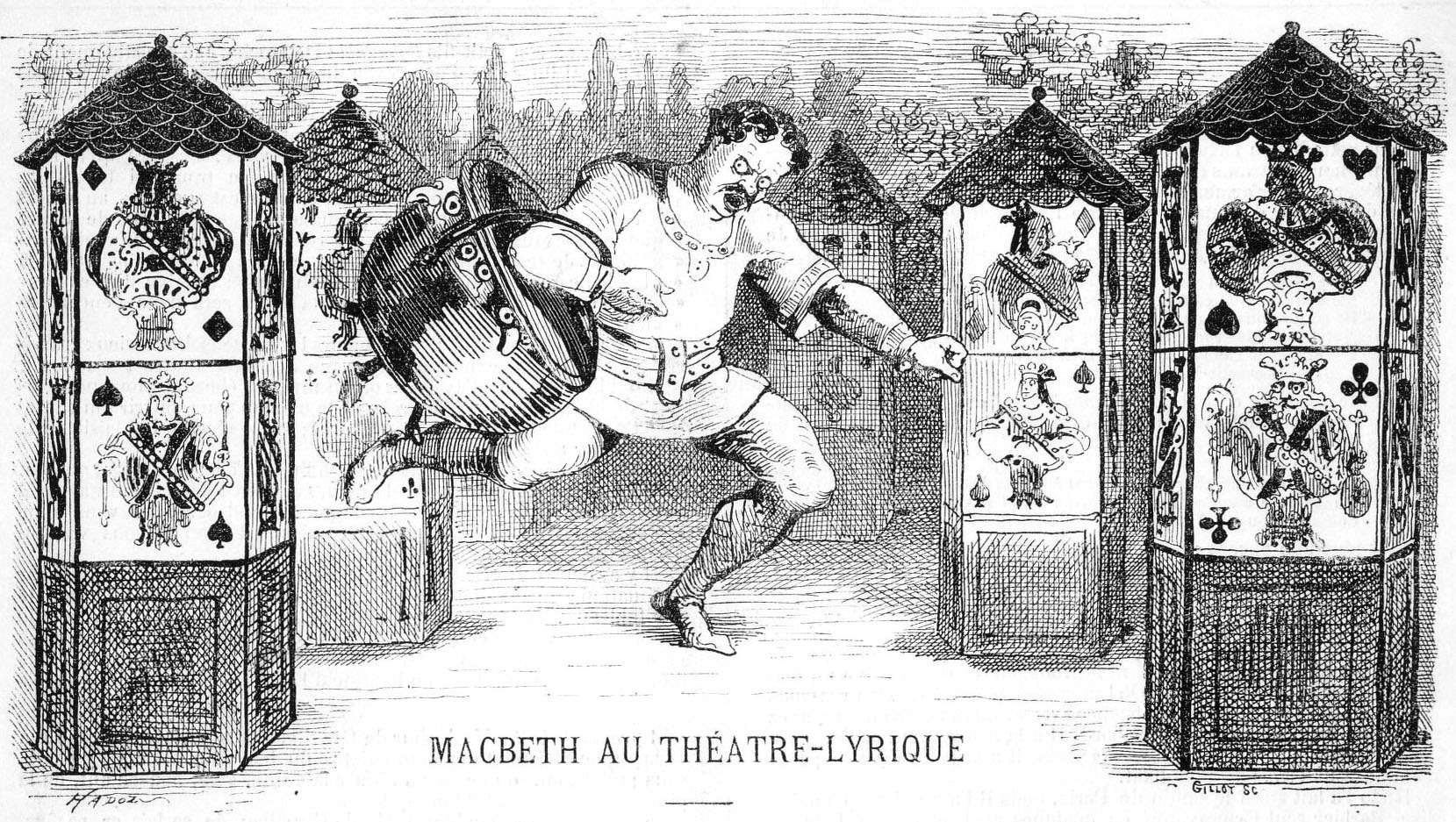
Caricature of Ismaël as Macbeth (1865)

In 1862, Ismaël was engaged by Carvalho for his Théâtre Lyrique company in Paris. Ismaël's time with the company marked the peak of his career. His debut on 30 September 1863 was as Zurga in the premiere of Bizet's Les pêcheurs de perles. This was followed by appearances beginning on 24 December in the title role of Verdi's Rigoletto, a new production which was highly successful and established Ismaël as one of the leading singers in the French capital. He also created the role of Ourrias in Gounod's Mireille and sang the title role in Verdi's Macbeth for the premiere of its revised version on 21 April 1865. Other roles included the title role in Donizetti's Don Pasquale, Falstaff in Nicolai's The Merry Wives of Windsor, and Sganarelle in Gounod's Le médecin malgré lui (1866). Ismaël stayed with the Théâtre Lyrique until Carvalho went bankrupt in 1868. He then sang at the Opéra de Marseille before returning to Paris in 1871 to join the Opéra-Comique at the Salle Favart, where he sang in the premieres of several more operas and operettas including Offenbach's Fantasio and Delibes' Le roi l'a dit as well as the company's first performances of Gounod's Roméo et Juliette (as Frère Laurent) and Le médecin malgré lui (as Sganarelle).

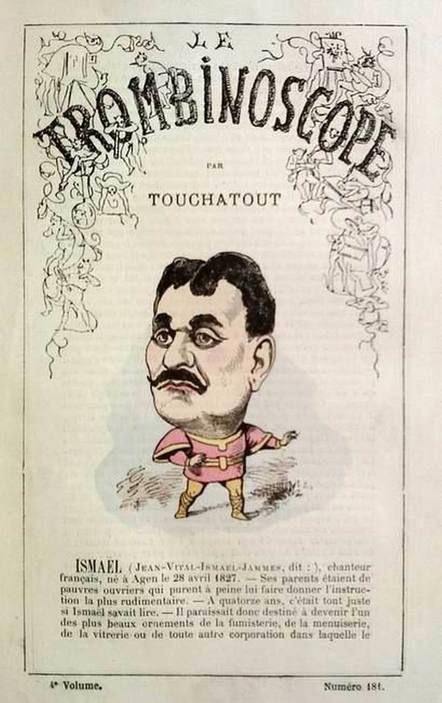
Caricature of Ismaël Le Trombinoscope, 1877

=== Later career ===
In the mid-1870s, vocal problems attributed to laryngitis caused him to retire from the Opéra-Comique. He was appointed Professor of Lyric Declamation (Opera) at the Paris Conservatoire on 1 February 1874, but on 23 December 1876 he was abruptly dismissed from his post without explanation. Ismaël repeatedly, but unsuccessfully, asked for a public investigation into the affair. Following his dismissal from the conservatoire and the subsequent loss of his salary there, he returned to the stage appearing in comic operas and operettas at the Théâtre du Casino in Monte Carlo and the Théâtre de la Renaissance in Paris until 1880. In 1877, the year in which Ismaël appeared in the premiere of the Strauss operetta La tzigane at the Théâtre de la Renaissance, the satirical revue Le Trombinoscope devoted an entire issue to him with a biography by "Touchatout" (Léon-Charles Bienvenu). He went on to appear in two more world premieres at the Théâtre de la Renaissance—Lecocq's La jolie persane in 1879 (as Nadir) and Planquette's Les voltigeurs de la 32ème in 1880 (as Richard). Amongst his performances at the Théâtre du Casino in Monte Carlo was the title role in Planquette's Le chevalier Gaston for its world premiere in 1879.

=== Marriage and retirement years ===
Jean-Vital Jammes and Marie Garcin c. 1887

His pupils included Max Bouvet and Jean Delvoye.

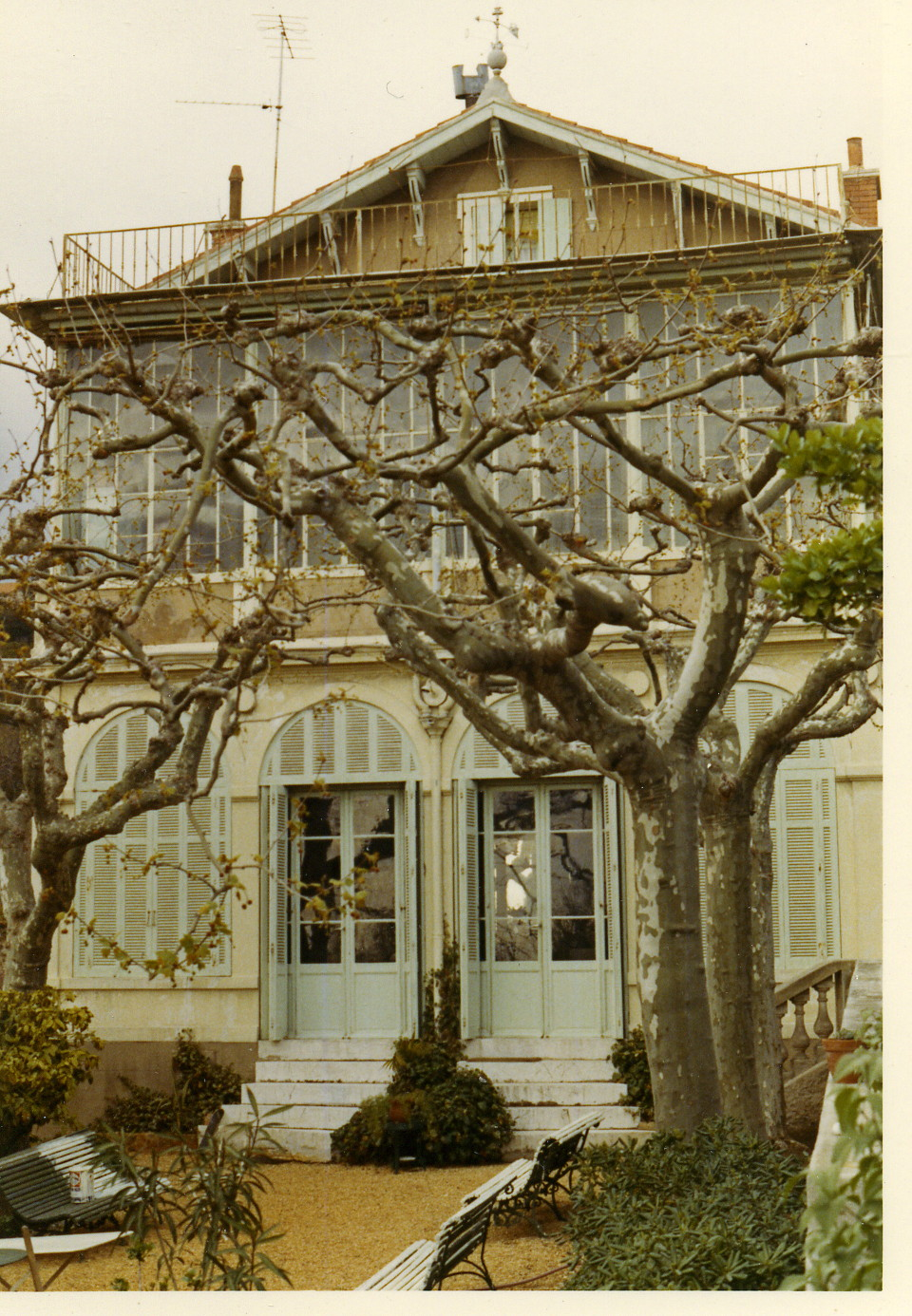
Ismaël's villa in Marseille

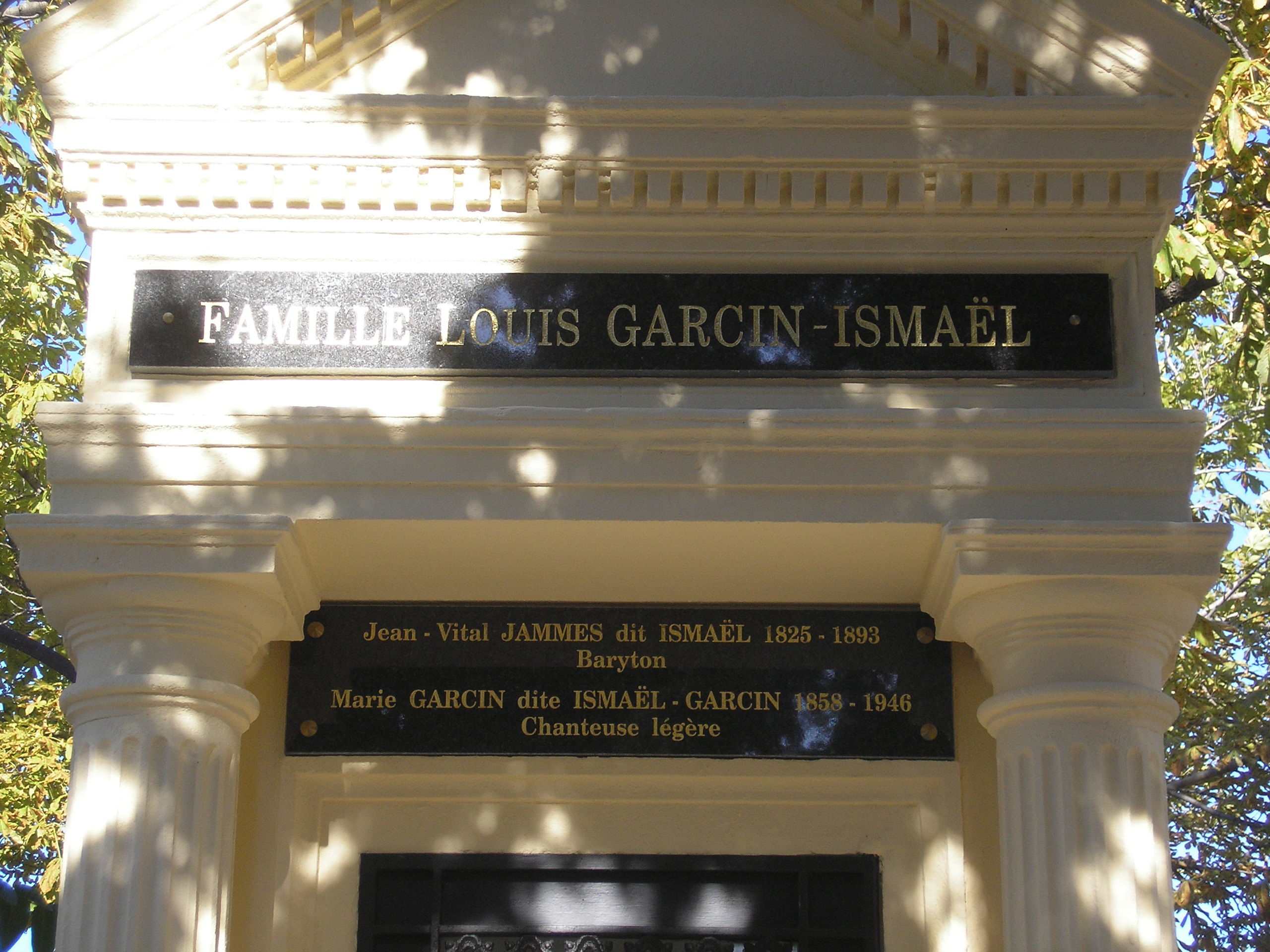
Jean-Vital Jammes and Marie Garcin's tomb, Cimetière Saint-Pierre

Ismaël married twice, first at the age of 27 to the soprano Alceste Cœuriot (also known by the first name "Anaïs"). The couple were both singing at the Grand Théâtre de Lyon at the time of their marriage in 1852, after which Alceste appeared under the last name "Ismaël". They continued their careers as a couple – first at Lyon, next at the Grand Théâtre de Bordeaux, and finally at the Opéra de Marseille in 1854. However, from 1854 on, their marriage was troubled, and Cœuriot asked for and obtained a separation in 1860 at the expense of Ismaël. As early as the first half of 1856, Cœuriot no longer appeared on the attendance lists of the Opéra de Marseille next to him. (Note: Judgment of "separation" kept in the departmental archives of the Bouches du Rhône.)

In order to marry one of his students, Ismael requested a divorce as soon as she returned to the jurisdiction of French law ( she could not be served by judicial authorities as she was continuing her career in Belgium). They were officially divorced in 1885 after years of living apart, and shortly thereafter he married Marie Garcin (1858–1946), a young opera singer who had been one of his pupils. The following year, he brought a lawsuit against his first wife to prevent her from continuing to perform under his last name but was unsuccessful, with the court ruling that Cœuriot won a definitive right to perform as "Madam Ismaël", which had been her stage name since 1852, while Garcin, the second wife, would then be called "Ismaël-Garcin". At the time of the court case (May 1886), and much to the onstage consternation of Alceste, both she and his second wife found themselves singing in the same production of Faust at the Théâtre du Capitole in Toulouse—Alceste Ismaël as Marguerite and Marie Ismaël-Garcin as Marguerite's guardian, Marthe.

According to Étienne Destranges, writing in Le Théâtre à Nantes, Marie Ismaël-Garcin had been a singer of great promise and achieved a considerable success in Nantes as Dinorah in Meyerbeer's Le pardon de Ploërmel, but by 1889 her light voice was already in decline. Ismaël spent the last years of his life with Marie at his villa in Marseille and gave private singing lessons. The villa, which he had bought in 1861, still exists and is situated in the Roucas-Blanc neighborhood on the Traverse Ismaël (named after him). A public staircase, the Escalier du Prophète, leads from the Traverse Ismaël to the beach, Plage du Prophète. According to local newspapers, the staircase and beach took their name from Meyerbeer's opera Le prophète, which Ismaël would often practice on the beach.

Jean-Vital Jammes died in Marseille on 13 June 1893 at the age of 68. Marie Garcin never remarried and lived in the villa for the rest of her life. She died at her home in 1946 and is buried with her husband in the family tomb at the Cimetière Saint-Pierre in Marseille.

== Roles created ==
Ismaël is known to have created the following roles:

- Zurga in Bizet's Les pêcheurs de perles (Théâtre-Lyrique du Châtelet, Paris, 30 September 1863)
- Ourrias in Gounod's Mireille (Théâtre-Lyrique du Châtelet, Paris, 19 March 1864)
- Quirino in Poniatowski's L'aventurier (Théâtre-Lyrique du Châtelet, Paris, 26 January 1865)
- Giaffir in Adrien Barthe's La fiancée d'Abydos (Théâtre-Lyrique du Châtelet, Paris, 30 December 1865)
- Cardillac in Lucien Dautresme's Cardillac (Théâtre-Lyrique du Châtelet, Paris, 11 December 1867)
- Prince of Mantua in Offenbach's Fantasio (Opéra-Comique, Paris 18 January 1872)
- Marquis Moncontour in Delibes' Le roi l'a dit (Opéra-Comique, Paris, 24 May 1873)
- Andrea Galeotti in Charles Lenepveu's Le Florentin (Opéra-Comique, Paris, 25 February 1874)
- Gille in Ambroise Thomas' Gille et Gillotin (Opéra-Comique, Paris, 22 April 1874)
- Matthias in Strauss' La tzigane (Théâtre de la Renaissance, Paris, 30 October 1877)
- Gaston in Planquette's Le chevalier Gaston (Théâtre du Casino, Monte Carlo, 8 February 1879)
- Nadir in Lecocq's La jolie persane (Théâtre de la Renaissance, Paris, 28 October 1879)
- Richard in Planquette's Les voltigeurs de la 32ème (Théâtre de la Renaissance, Paris, 7 January 1880)

== Performances at the Grand Théâtre, Marseille 1854-1860 ==
Ismaël first sang at Marseille's Grand-Théâtre (or Salle Bauveau) in 1854 during Provini's second management of the theatre. He continued to perform there for six seasons in the following operas:

- Meyerbeer's L'étoile du nord, 30 December 1854 (as Gritzenko; Alceste Cœuriot was also in the cast)
- Poise's Bonsoir voisin, 8 January 1855

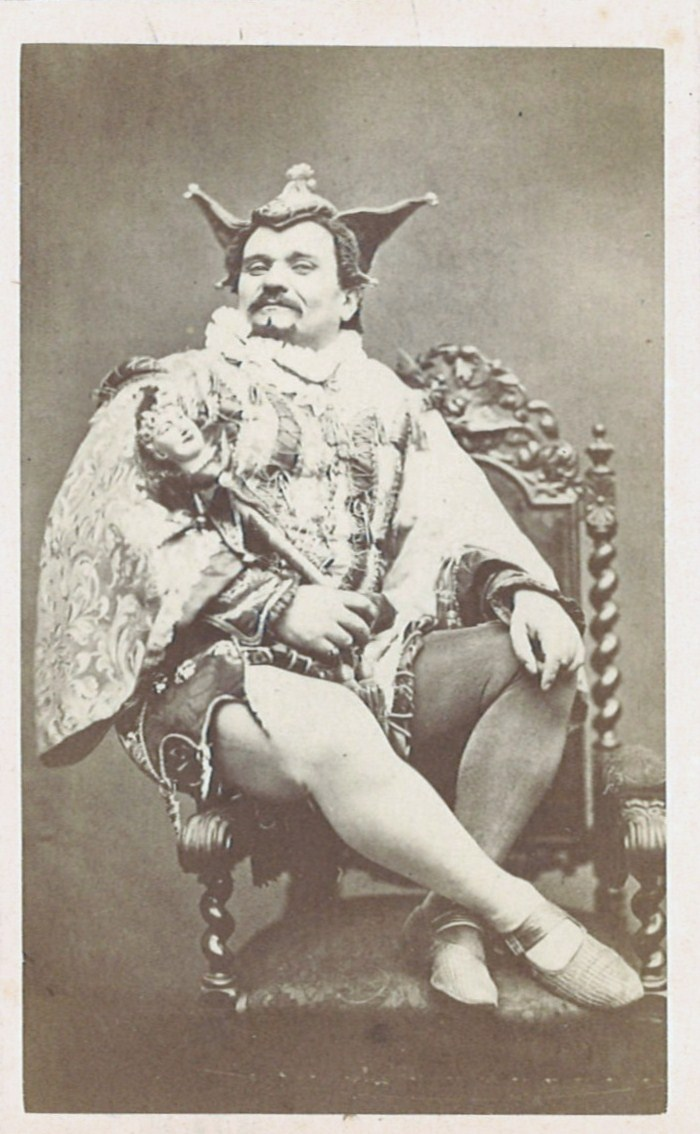
Ismaël as Rigoletto in Verdi's opera, 1865

- Clapisson's La Promise, 9 March 1855
- Agnelli's Léonore de Médicis, 23 March 1855
- Grisar's Le chien du jardinier, 21 October 1855
- Ernest Boulanger's Les sabots de la marquise, 21 November 1855
- Donizetti's Linda di Chamounix, 17 December 1855
- Count di Luna in Verdi's Le trouvère, 22 February 1856
- Donizetti's Marino Faliero, 14 March 1857 (Luigi Merly was also in the cast)
- Charles V in Verdi's Ernani, 12 February 1858
- Auber's Marco Spada, 14 April 1858
- Bazin's Maître Pathelin, 12 November 1858
- Flotow's Martha, 15 December 1858
- Maillart's Les dragons de Villars, 21 January 1859 (as Sergeant Belamy)
- Gounod's Le médecin malgré lui, 7 March 1859
- Gevaert's Quentin Durward, 15 November 1859
- Halévy's Jaguarita l'Indienne, 6 February 1860
- Morel's Le jugement de Dieu, 7 March 1860
- Verdi's Rigoletto, 12 May 1860 (Marie-Stéphanie Meillet, Armandi, Depassio were also in the cast)

== Performances at the Théâtre des Arts, Rouen 1862-1863 ==
Ismaël is known to have sung in the following performances at the Théâtre des Arts (Rouen):

- Rossini's Guillaume Tell, 15 September 1862
- Rossini's Le barbier de Seville
- Donizetti's Lucie de Lammermoor, 18 September 1862
- Maillart's Les dragons de Villars (Pauline Borghese and Bouvard from the Théâtre Lyrique were also in the cast)
- Verdi's Le trouvère, late 1862
- Verdi's Rigoletto, 3 December 1862 (Irène Lambert, the tenor Mazerini, the bass Valette, and Célestine Galli-Marié were also in the cast)
- Adam's Si j'étais roi, early 1863 (replacing the baritone Villefroy)
- Balfe's La bohémienne, 1863 (replacing Bonnasseur)
- Meyerbeer's Les Huguenots, 1863 (the tenor Depassio was also in the cast)
- Gaveaux's Le bouffe et le tailleur
- Auber's La fiancée, 22 March 1863
- Verdi's Ernani
- Mozart's Les noces de Figaro (Célestine Galli-Marié was also in the cast)
