= Marie Ismaël-Garcin =

French opera singer (1858–1946)

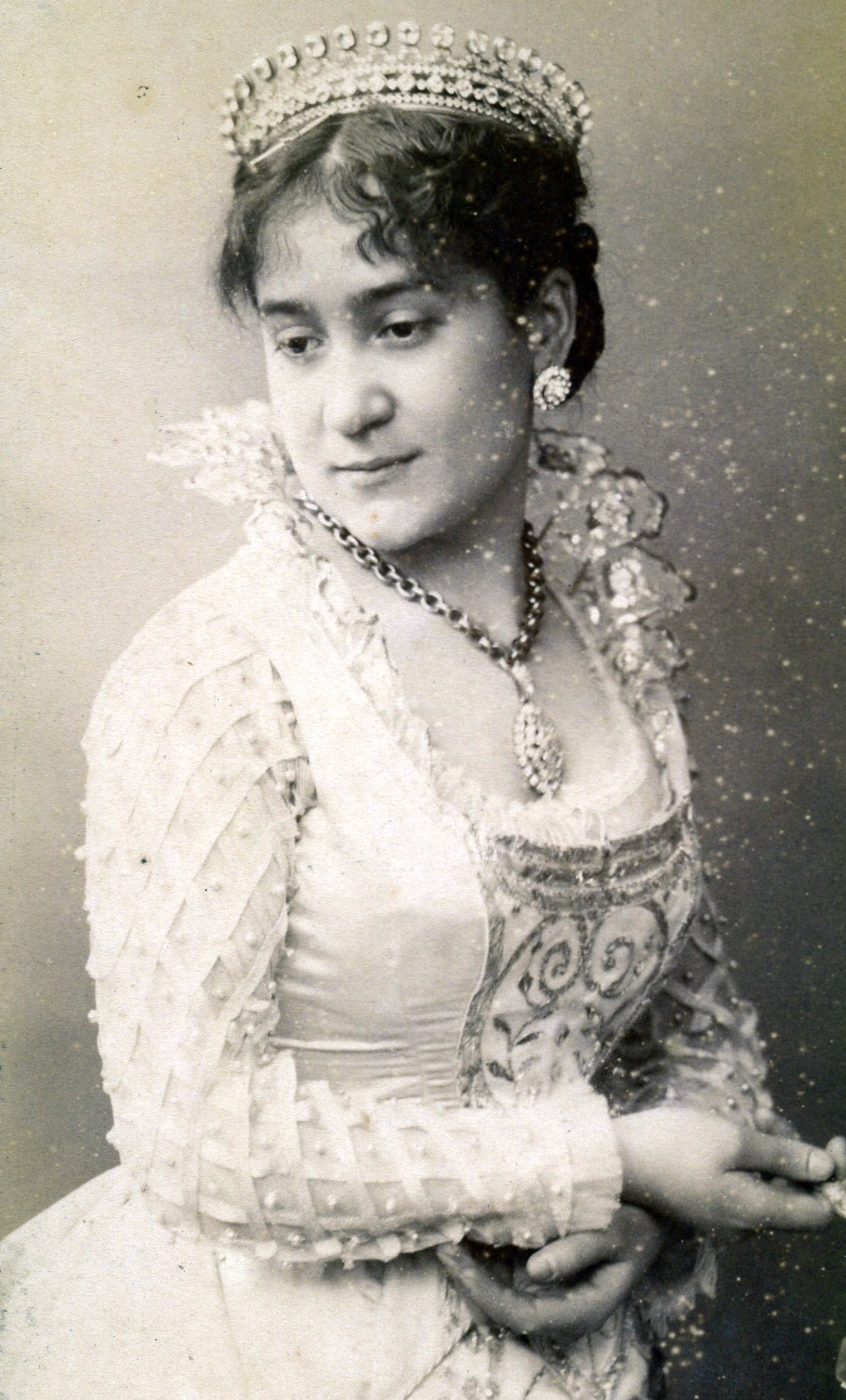
Marie Ismaël-Garcin in stage costume, Lille, 1880s

Marie Ismaël-Garcin (4 April 1858 - 6 December 1946), was a French opera singer who specialised in light soprano roles and sang leading roles in several French opera houses during the 1880s. She was married to the French baritone, Jean-Vital Jammes.

== Life and career ==
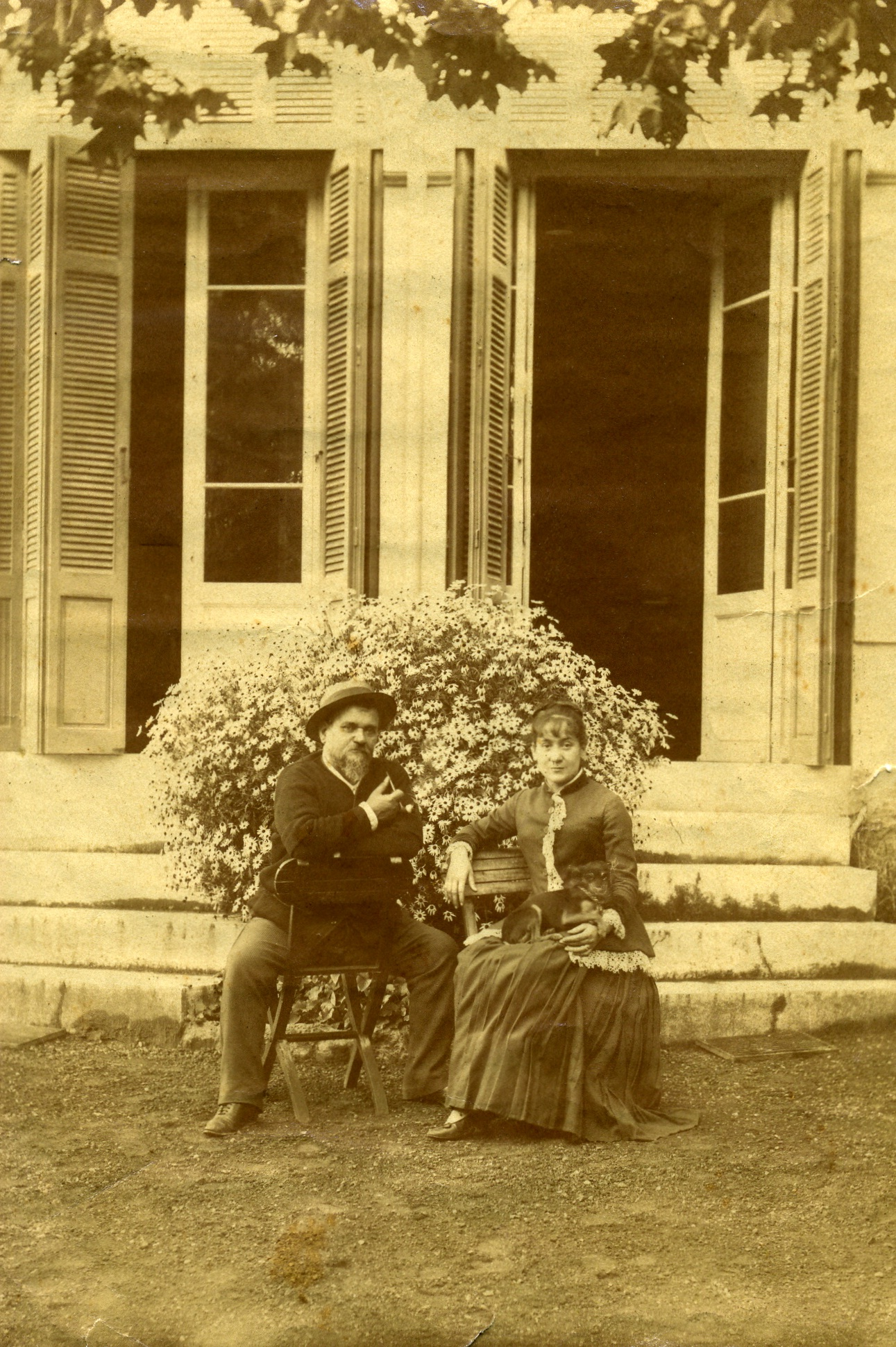
Marie and Ismaël at their villa in Marseille

Marie Ismaël-Garcin was born Rose Françoise Marie Garcin in Marseille and studied singing in Paris under Jean-Vital Jammes (known by his stage name, Ismaël). She later married him, after which she performed under the surname Ismaël-Garcin.

In 1880, she appeared at the Opéra de Marseille in Herold's Zampa and is known to have sung at the Grand Théâtre in Angers in 1883, where she achieved success in Fra Diavolo and as Annette in Robin des Bois (an adaptation of Weber's Der Freischütz). In 1885, she married Ismaël shortly after his divorce from his first wife from whom he had been separated for many years. The following year, he brought an unsuccessful lawsuit against his first wife, Alceste Cœuriot, to prevent her from continuing to perform under his last name, but he was unsuccessful. At court, Cœuriot won a definitive right to perform as "Madam Ismaël", which had been her stage name since 1852, and Garcin would then be called "Ismaël-Garcin". At the time of the court case (May 1886), both Marie Ismaël-Garcin and his first wife (Cœuriot, also known as Alceste Ismaël) were singing in the same production of Faust at the Théâtre du Capitole in Toulouse—Alceste as Marguerite and Marie as Marguerite's guardian, Marthe.

In 1886, Ismaël-Garcin was given a contract at the Opéra de Marseille as "première chanteuse légère" and appeared there during the 1886/1887 seasons as Cathérine Glover in Bizet's La jolie fille de Perth and Ophélie in Thomas's Hamlet, amongst other roles. The 1888/1889 seasons saw her singing at the Théâtre Graslin in Nantes. According to Étienne Destranges, writing in Le Théâtre à Nantes, Marie Ismaël-Garcin had been a singer of great promise and achieved a considerable success there as Dinorah in Meyerbeer's Le pardon de Ploërmel, but by 1889, her voice was already in decline. After a poor performance in Lalo's Le roi d'Ys in April of that year, she retired from the stage.

Ismaël had retired definitively from the stage in the early 1880s and spent the last years of his life with Marie at his villa in Marseille. After his death in 1893, Marie Garcin never remarried and lived in their villa for the rest of her life. She remained active in the musical life of the city, giving the occasional concert and helping to produce a benefit performance of Ferdinand Poise Joli Gilles in 1910. She died at her home in 1946 and is buried with her husband in the family tomb at the Cimetière Saint-Pierre in Marseille.

== Sources ==
- Auditor (8 January 1887). "La Vedette au Spectacle". La Vedette (Marseille) (in French)
- Destranges, Étienne (1902). Le Théâtre à Nantes: depuis ses origines jusqu'à nos jours. Fischbacher (in French)
- Gentet (ed.) (17 December 1910). "Le monde e la ville". La Vedette (Marseille). (in French)
- Oeil Sincère (14 January 1884). "Angers", La Bavarde. (in French)
- Rivière, Hippolyte-Ferréol (1887). "Acteurs: Propriété des noms et pseudonymes", Pandectes françaises : nouveau répertoire de doctrine, de législation et de jurisprudence, Volume 2, pp. 6–8 . Chevalier-Marescq (in French)
- Savarin (28 November 1880). "La Vedette au théâtre". La Vedette (Marseille) (in French)
- Silvestre, Armand (1886). "Deux femmes pour un mari" (originally published in Gil Blas), Georges d'Heylli (ed.) Gazette anecdotique, littéraire, artistique et bibliographique, Vol. 1, p. 213. Librairie des bibliophiles (in French)
- Vilrey, J. de (20 June 1886) "Nouvelles artistiques". Lyon s'amuse (in French)
