= Jules Adenis =

French opera librettist, playwright and journalist

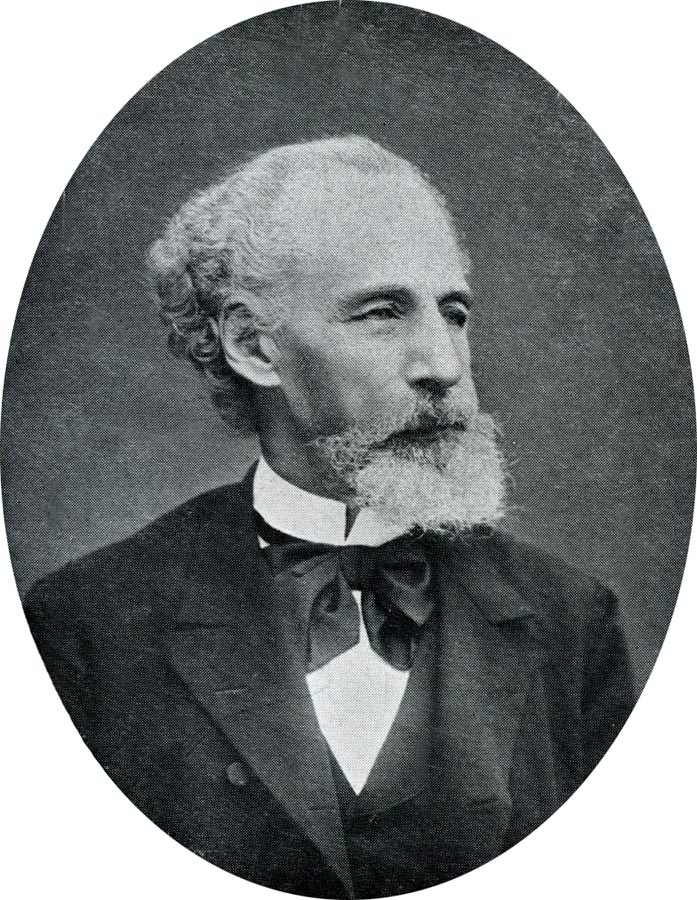
Jules Adenis

Jules-Adenis de Colombeau (28 June 1823 – 1900) was a 19th-century French opera librettist, playwright, and journalist.

Adenis was born in Paris and studied at the Collège royal de Bourbon (now the Lycée Condorcet). Colombeau was initially employed by the Compagnie de Saint-Gobain. At this time he was already working for various newspapers and magazines.

Some of Colombeau's works include Un Postillon en gage (1856) Sylvie (1864), and La Grand'tante (1867).

Both of Colombeau's sons, Eugène (1854–1923) and Édouard (1867–1952) became writers and librettists.

== La Fiancée d'Abydos ==
La Fiancée d'Abydos, premiered 30 December 1865 at the Théâtre-Lyrique

- Libretto: Jules Adenis
- Music: Adrien Barthe
- Mise en scène : Léon Carvalho
- Lithographs : Pierre-Auguste Lamy
- Décorateurs: Joseph Thierry et Charles-Antoine Cambon
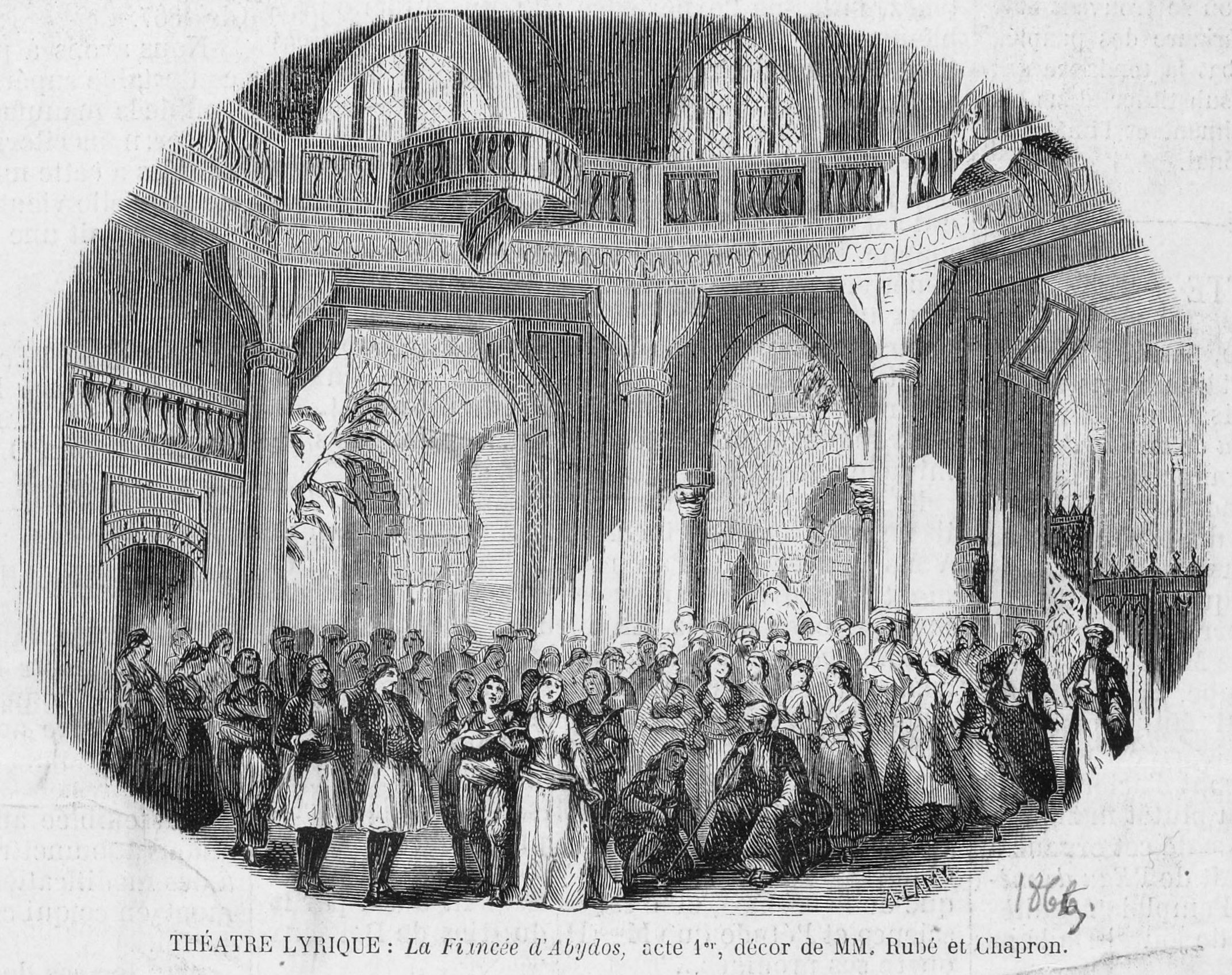
Act 1, scene 4

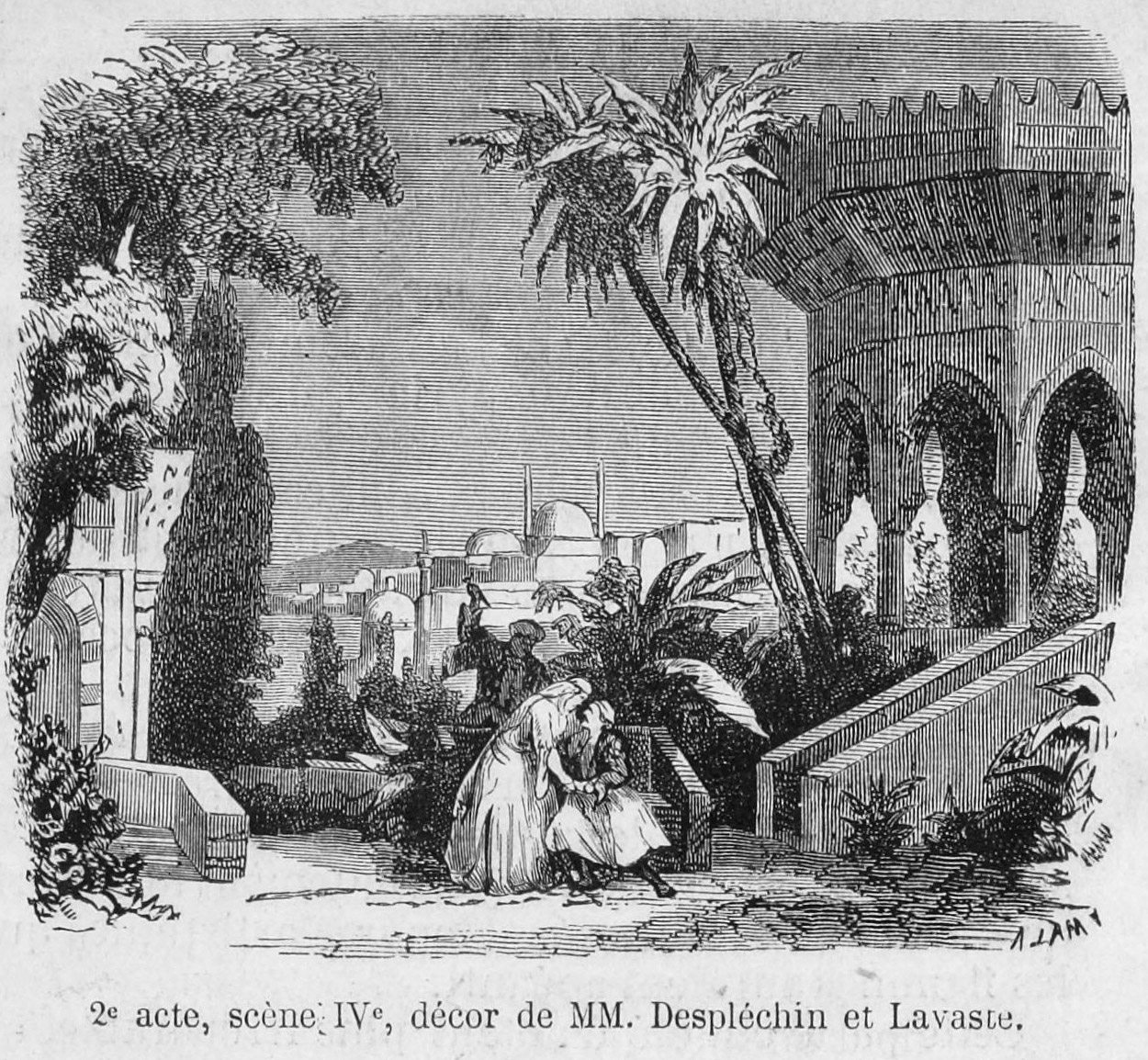
Act 2, scene 4

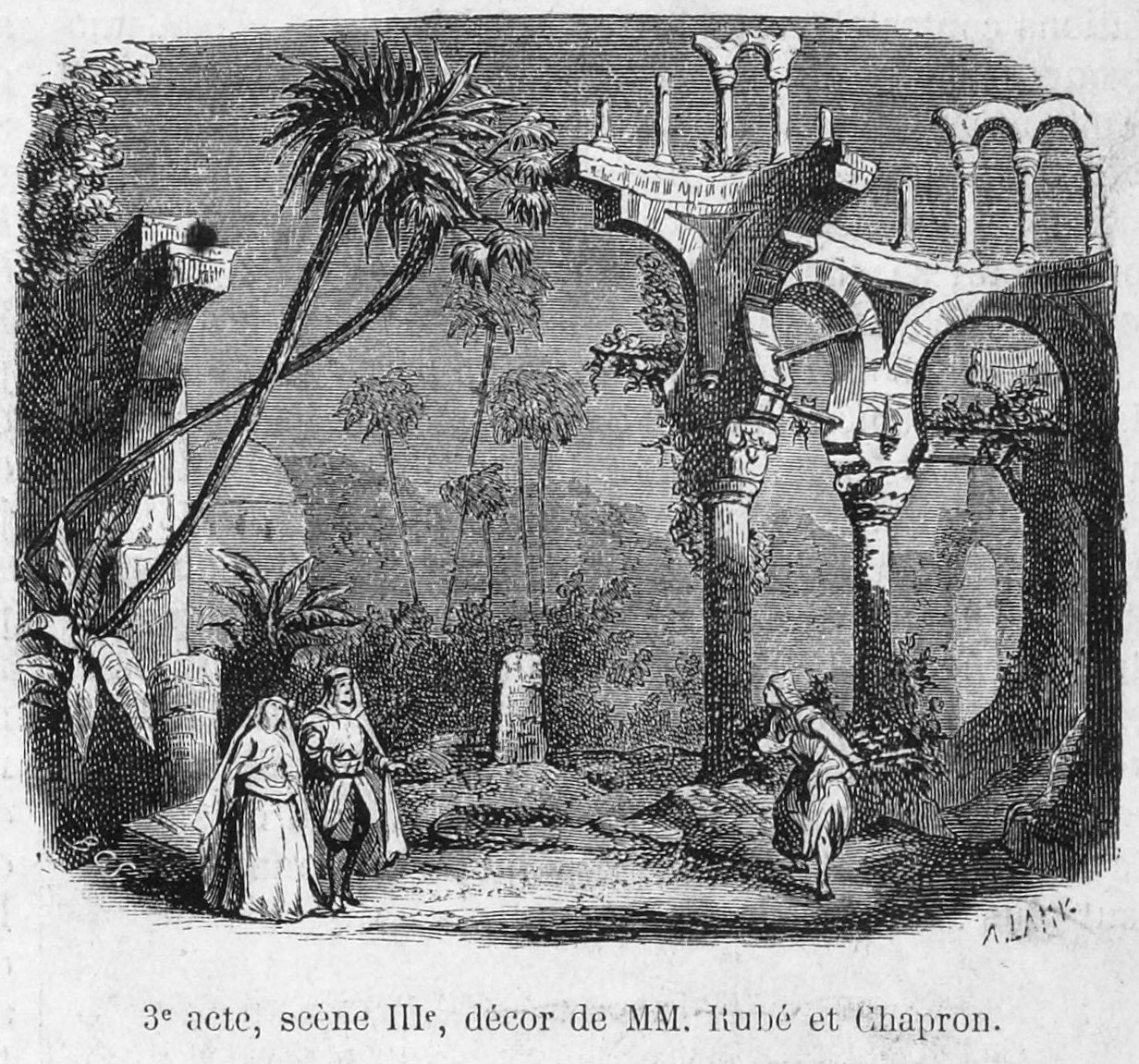
Act 3, scene 3

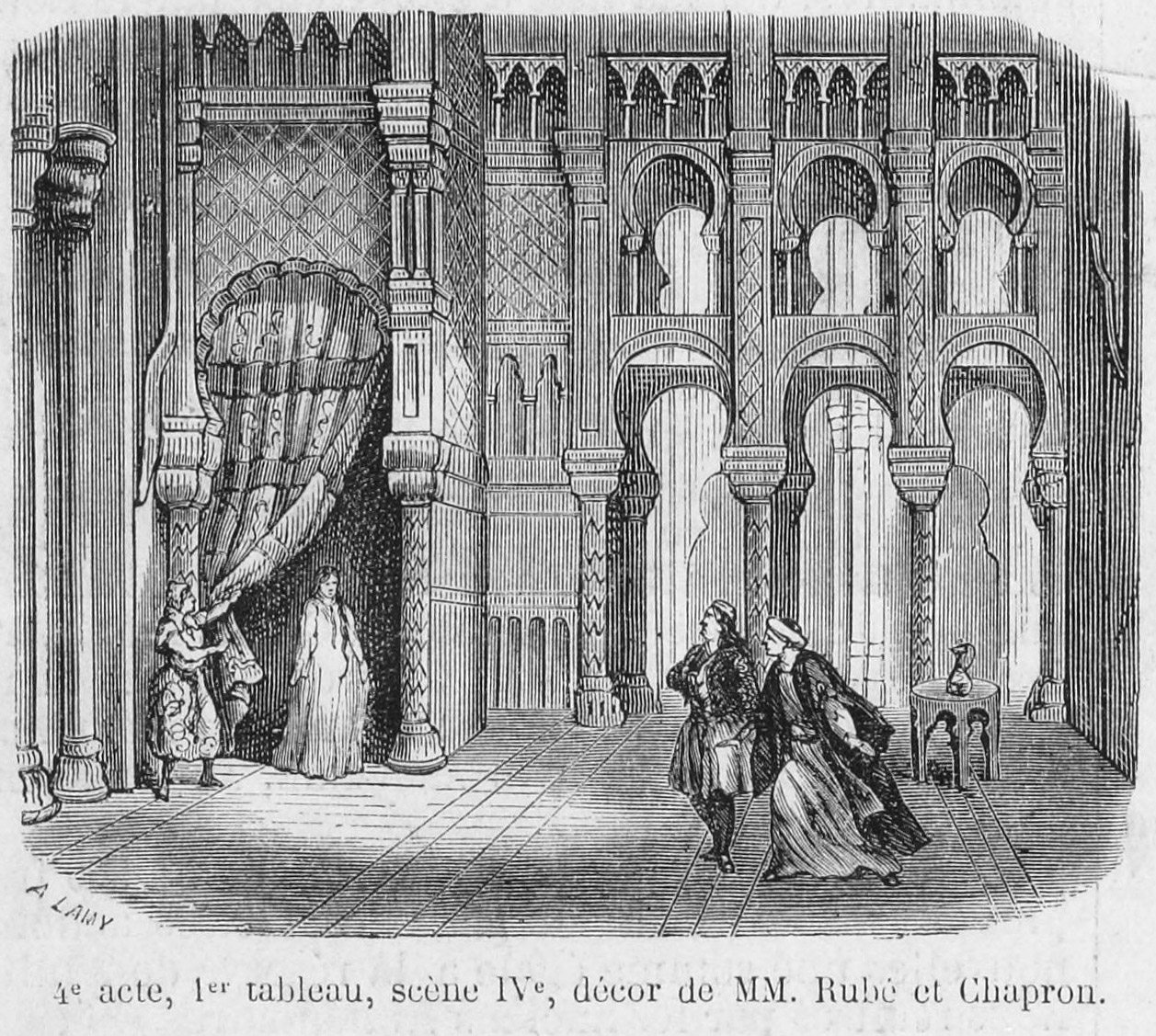
Act 4, 1st tableau, scene 4

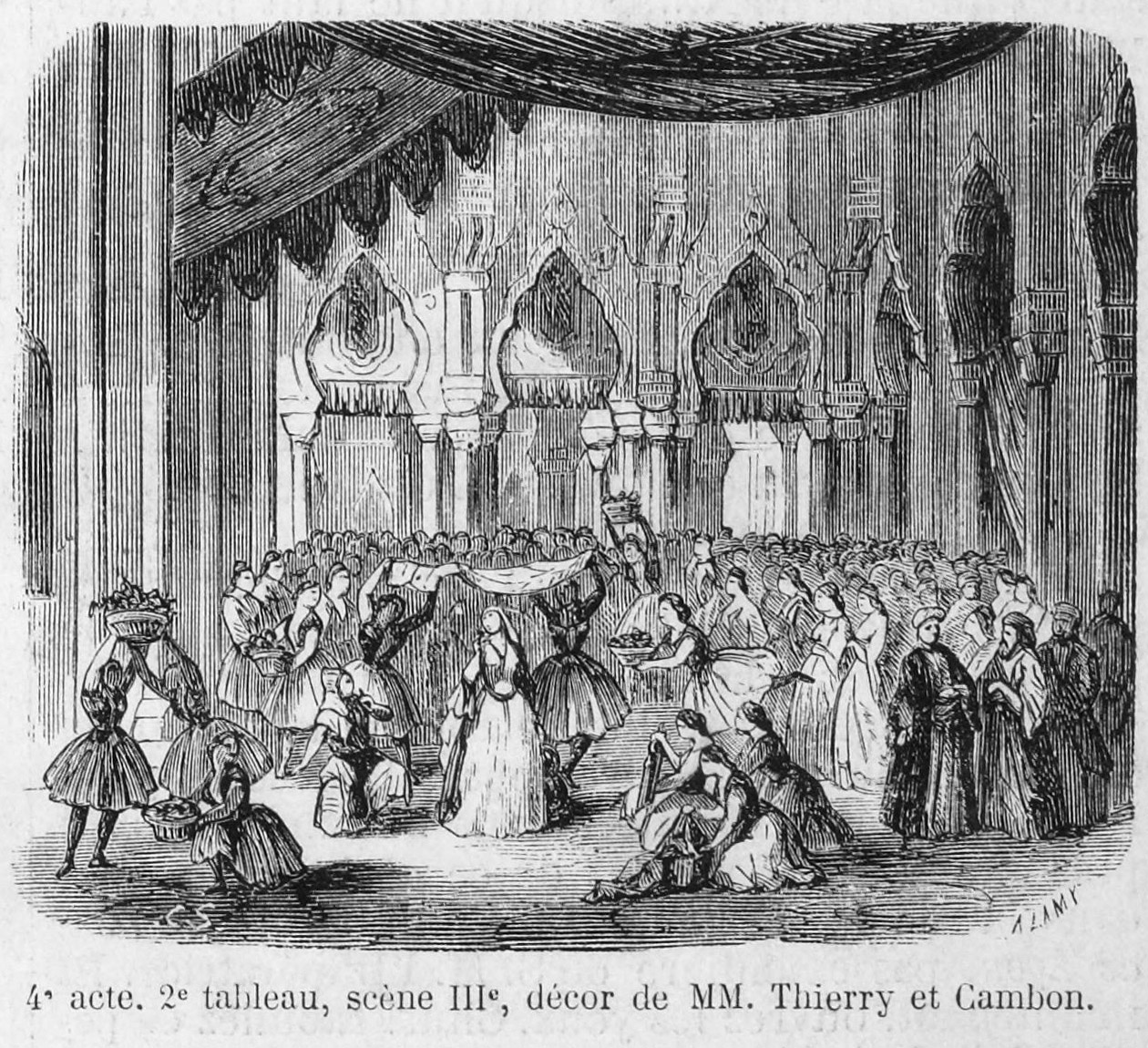
Act 4, 2nd tableau, scene 3

== Works ==
Opera librettos

- 1856: Un Postillon en gage, one-act operetta, with Édouard Plouvier, music by Jacques Offenbach, Théâtre des Bouffes-Parisiens, 9 February
- 1863: Madame Pygmalion, one-act opérette bouffe, with Francis Tourte, music by Frédéric Barbier, Théâtre des Bouffes-Parisiens, 6 February
- 1864: Sylvie, one-act opéra comique, with Jules Rostaing, music by Ernest Guiraud, Opéra-Comique, 11 May
- 1865: La Fiancée d'Abydos, opera in 4 acts and 5 tableaux, music by Adrien Barthe, Théâtre-Lyrique, 30 December
- 1867: La Grand'tante, one-act opéra comique, with Charles Grandvallet, music by Jules Massenet, Opéra-comique, 3 April
- 1867: La Jolie fille de Perth, opera in 4 acts and 5 tableaux, after Walter Scott, with Henri de Saint-Georges, music by Georges Bizet, Théâtre-Lyrique impérial, 26 December
- 1868: La Contessina, three-act opéra-seria, with Henri de Saint-Georges, Italian text by Achille de Lauzières, music by Joseph Poniatowski, Théâtre Italien, 28 April
- 1873: Les Trois Souhaits, one-act opéra comique, music by Ferdinand Poise, Opéra-Comique, 29 October
- 1878: La Zingarella, one-act opéra comique, music by Joseph O'Kelly, Opéra-Comique, 26 February La Zingarella, with Jules Montini
- 1884: Le Portrait, two-act opéra comique, with Laurencin, music by Théodore Lajarte, Opéra-Comique, 18 June
- 1886: Les Templiers, opera in 5 acts and 7 tableaux, with Paul-Armand Silvestre and Lionel Bonnemère, music by Henry Litolff, Bruxelles, Théâtre de la Monnaie, 25 January
- 1886: Juge et Partie, two-act opéra comique, after Montfleury, music by Edmond Missa, Opéra-Comique, 17 November
- 1897: Le Légataire universel (with Lionel Bonnemère, after Jean-François Regnard), "opéra bouffe" in 3 acts, music by Georges Pfeiffer
- 1907: Marcella, music by Umberto Giordano

Theatre

- 1852: Une Nuit orageuse, two-act comedy, mingled with song, with Armand d'Artois, Théâtre du Vaudeville, 18 September
- 1854: Ne touchez pas à la hache!, "comédie-vaudeville" in 1 act (with Édouard Plouvier), Paris, Théâtre des Folies-Dramatiques, 15 April Text online
- 1854: Ô le meilleur des pères, comédie en vaudeville, with Adrien Decourcelle, Théâtre des Variétés, 10 June
- 1855: Philanthropie et repentir, "comédie-vaudeville" in 1 act, Théâtre des Variétés, 25 April
- 1855: Trop beau pour rien faire, one-act comedy mingled with song, with Édouard Plouvier, Théâtre du Vaudeville, 13 November
- 1857: La Crise de ménage, one-act comedy mingled with songs, with Édouard Plouvier, Théâtre des Variétés, 23 December
- 1859: Feu le capitaine Octave, one-act comedy, with Édouard Plouvier, Théâtre du Vaudeville, 19 March
- 1860: Si Pontoise le savait!, "comédie-vaudeville" in 1 act, with Laurencin and Francis Tourte, Théâtre du Palais-Royal, 25 February
- 1860: Une Bonne pour tout faire, "comédie-vaudeville" in 1 act, with Jules Rostaing, Théâtre Déjazet, 16 March
- 1860: Toute seule, one-act comedy mingled with song, with Édouard Plouvier, Théâtre du Vaudeville, 4 July
- 1868: La Czarine, drama in 5 acts and 8 tableaux, with Octave Gastineau, Théâtre de l'Ambigu-Comique, 30 May Text online
- 1874: L'Officier de fortune, drama in 5 acts and 10 tableaux, including a prologue, with Jules Rostaing, Théâtre de l'Ambigu-Comique, 11 September
- 1879: L'Abîme de Trayas, drama in 5 acts and 6 tableaux, with Jules Rostaing, Théâtre de Cluny, 16 January

Varia

- 1887–1889: Le Théâtre chez soi. Contes et légendes en action. Charades en trois parties, 5 vols.
- 1892: Les Étapes d'un touriste en France. De Marseille à Menton Text online
