= Victor Capoul =

French operatic tenor

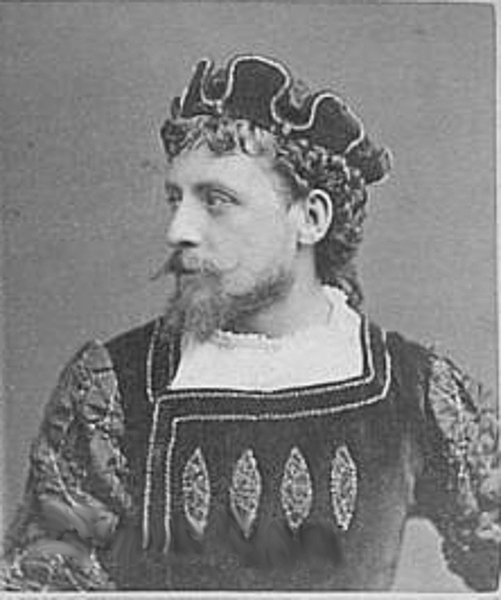
Victor Capoul

Joseph Victor Amédée Capoul (27 February 1839 – 18 February 1924) was a French operatic lyric tenor renowned for his graceful singing style as well as his wonderful acting skills.

== Early life ==
Capoul was born in Toulouse on 27 February 1839.

== Career ==
Victor Capoul began his studies in Toulouse. He was admitted to the Conservatoire de Paris in 1859, where, as a pupil of Révial (singing) and Mocker (opéra comique), he won a first prize for the latter in 1861.

He was engaged at the Opéra-Comique the same year and made his debut on 26 August as Daniel in Adolphe Adam's Le Chalet. He sang other roles in the repertoire such as in La fille du régiment, La part du diable, La dame blanche, Le pré aux clercs and L'étoile du nord, until leaving in 1870. He also created the roles of Renaud in Lefébure-Wély's 1861 opera Les Recruteurs, Eustache in Les Absents by Ferdinand Poise on 26 October 1864, Horace in the two-act version of Gounod's opera La colombe on 7 June 1866, Le Marquis de Kerdrel in La grand'tante on 3 April 1867, Gaston de Maillepré in Le premier jour de bonheur on 15 February 1868, and Valentin/Vert-Vert in Offenbach's opéra comique Vert-Vert on 10 March 1869.

On 1 July 1864, during a temporary closure of the Salle Favart, Capoul appeared with Balbi in The Barber of Seville at the Théâtre Porte-Saint-Martin. He took part in the performance of the prize cantata at the Conservatoire Renaud dans les jardins d'Armide, words by Camille du Locle, music by Charles Lenepveu on 4 January 1866. In 1866 he was involved in a dispute between the Opéra-Comique and the Théâtre Lyrique, which was attempting to engage him—both for his voice and his looks—as Roméo in the premiere of Gounod's opera Roméo et Juliette, the part eventually going to Michot. In the same year he saw success in the title role of Joseph at the Salle Favart.

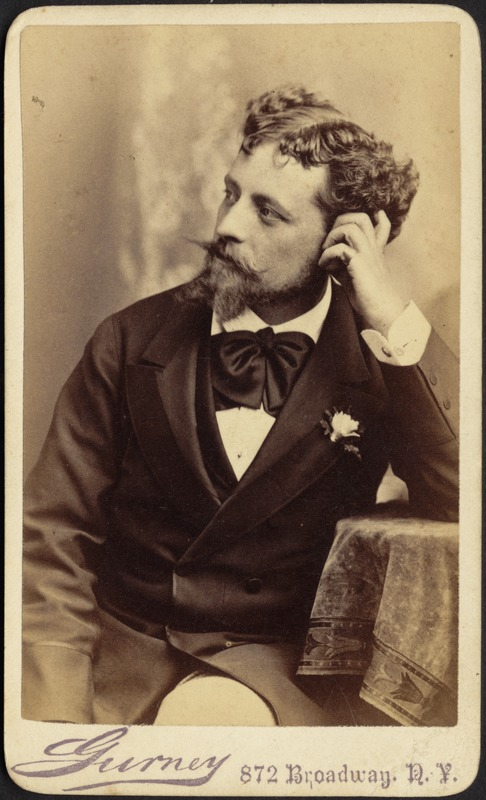
Capoul, [ca. 1859–1870]. Carte de Visite Collection, Boston Public Library

He was invited to London for a season in 1871 by Mapleson, appearing in Faust at Drury Lane and returned again until 1875; later from 1877 he was seen in Fra Diavolo at Covent Garden (which he had first sung at the Opéra-Comique in 1870), followed by Almaviva, Ernesto and Elvino. After several tours around Europe, to Saint Petersburg, Moscow and Vienna, he returned to Paris, and appeared in the premieres of Les amants de Vérone at the Théâtre Ventadour, Paul et Virginie, at the Gaité; Saïs (by Marguerite Olagnier) at the Théâtre de la Renaissance and Jocelyn at the Château d'Eau.

He took part in the concert given at the Trocadero on 8 June 1887, for a benefit for the victims of the recent fire at the Opéra-Comique.

In the US, he made his debut at the Academy of Music in 1871. Later, he appeared in the first season, that of 1883–84, at the New York Metropolitan Opera in Faust (title role), Mignon (Wilhelm Meister), La traviata (Alfredo) and Roméo et Juliette (Tybalt).

He collaborated on the libretto of Jocelyn, by Godard (première 25 February 1888 at La Monnaie, Brussels), and sang in the Paris premiere at the Théâtre du Chàteau-d'Eau on 13 October 1888. His one known recording is of an aria from this opera. It was made in Paris in 1905 for the Fonotipia Company and shows a voice past its prime. By this time Capoul was almost completely deaf. According to Scott however (Record of Singing: 1978) the mid-19th century style remains. What the listener hears is a wonderful showcase of elegant phrasing, immaculate artistry, as well as some impressive pianissimi and unbroken legato. Though evidently Capoul is past his prime, one can still get a good sense of his style and timbre; and perhaps even get a glimpse of what he sounded like in his glory days.

In 1899, Pedro Gailhard recruited him to become artistic director of the Opéra de Paris, of which establishment Gailhard was director. Capoul's later life was clouded by financial and other difficulties, and he died in reduced circumstances in Pujaudran, France on 18 February 1924.
