= Alceste Cœuriot =

French operatic mezzo-soprano

Alceste Anastasie Hortense Cœuriot, also known under the stage name Madame Ismaël, (born 1823 in Amsterdam, The Netherlands; died 1893 in Colombes, France) was a French operatic mezzo-soprano. Her professional career ran from 1850 to 1888 under the last name Ismaël, which was her husband Jean-Vital Jammes' stage name, and she would keep the stage name even after their divorce in 1860. Throughout her onstage roles, she mostly portrayed roles of comic old women, "duègne" roles, or "Dugazon" roles, which were of young mothers and women past youth.

== Early life and marriage ==
Alceste Cœuriot was born in 1823 to French tenor singer Paul-Joseph Cœuriot and French lyric singer Victoire Marie Françoise Lestage. Due to their professional careers, Alceste was born in Amsterdam, The Netherlands.

Around 1850, Paul-Joseph joined the Opéra National de Lyon, where his daughter also became a boarder. There, she met the baritone Ismaël, who joined Lyon in the summer of 1851, and on 24 January 1852, she married him in the Guillotière neighborhood of Lyon. They continued their careers as a couple – first at Lyon, next at the Grand Théâtre de Bordeaux, and finally at the Opéra de Marseille in 1854. However, from 1854 on, their marriage was troubled, and Cœuriot asked for and obtained a separation in 1860 at the expense of Ismaël. As early as the first half of 1856, Cœuriot no longer appeared on the attendance lists of the Opéra de Marseille next to him. (Note: Judgment of "separation" kept in the departmental archives of the Bouches du Rhône.)

== Career, lawsuit, retirement, and death ==
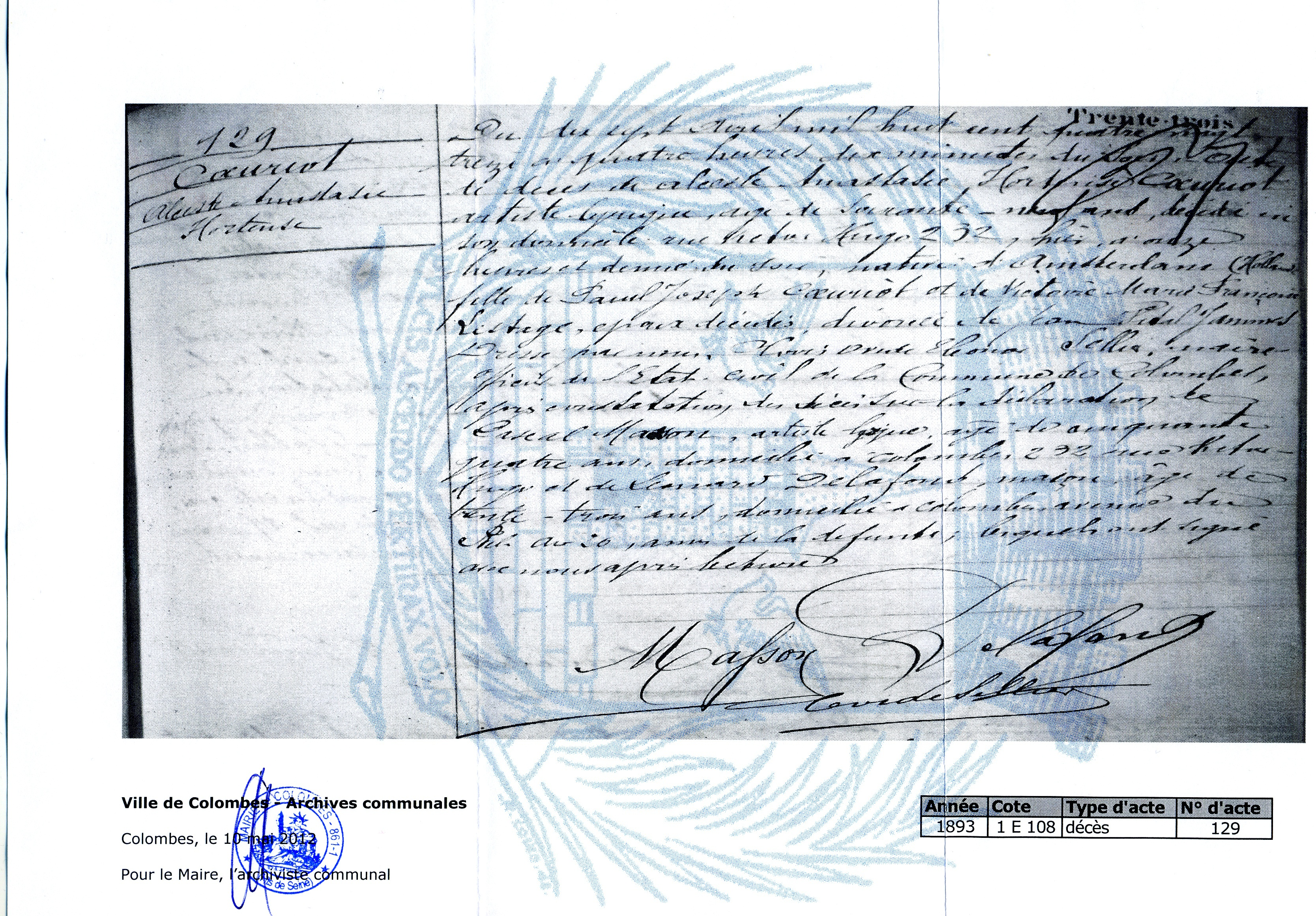
Cœuriot's death certificate, issued in 1893.

Cœuriot's career continued as she played typecast parts, first "Dugazon" roles and then roles as comic old women, or "duègne" (Note: See Emploi (théâtre) on French Wikipedia.) roles. After working in numerous French theaters, she settled in Brussels, at La Monnaie, from 1875 to 1885. She is shown in Jacques Isnardon's paintings of La Monnaie's troupes in 1875–1876, 1878–1879, 1879-1880 and 1884–1885. Isnardon also specifies her rate of pay during the years of 1877–1878, 1879–1880, and 1880-1881: 500 francs. (Note: At that time, Belgian francs were equal in value to French francs; the countries were part of the Latin Union.)

While she was in Belgium, she could not be found in France by judicial authorities; however, Ismaël requested a divorce as soon as she returned to the jurisdiction of French law so that he could marry one of his younger students. The divorce was enforced by default in Marseille on 30 March 1885. During the 1885–1886 season, Cœuriot performed at the Théâtre du Capitole in Toulouse, where she found she would be working alongside Ismaël's second wife, Marie Ismaël-Garcin. In 1886, they performed together in Faust by Charles Gounod, both still using Ismaël's name. Her former husband sued her at the civil court of Toulouse; he refused to let Cœuriot continue to perform under this name, believing that his position was lawful because of their divorce. At court, Cœuriot won a definitive right to perform as "Madam Ismaël", which had been her stage name since 1852. Garcin, the second wife, would then be called "Ismaël-Garcin".

In 1887, Cœuriot joined the Vlaamse Opera, where she would perform at least until 1888. In 1886, she performed La petite Fadette at the Théâtre du Château-d'Eau and at the Opéra-Populaire in 1887. (Note: Both these names refer to the Alhambra (Paris) of the 20th century, which was demolished in 1967.) On 26 June 1889, the pension granted to Cœuriot by an association of dramatic artists was closed during a general meeting of the association. This could be considered as a sign that she had retired. In 1892, one Madame Ismaël living on Châtillon Avenue in Paris "pulled" her pocketbook. Her death certificate was issued 17 April 1893. She had lived in Colombes, France, at 232 Victor Hugo Road, apparently in the company of another lyric artist, 54-year old Pascal Masson. She left no known living descendants.

== Repertoire ==
Théâtre de la Monnaie, Bruxelles (1875–1885)

- Madame Tidmann in Piccolino by Victorien Sardou, 4 November 1876

Théâtre du Capitole de Toulouse (1886)

- Marthe in Faust by Charles Gounod, 1886

Théâtre du Château-d'Eau (1886 / 1887 - devenu Opéra Populaire)

- La petite Fadette, 1886, 1887

Théâtre royal d’Anvers (1880 / 1887–1888)

- La dame blanche by François Adrien Boieldieu, 26 September 1880 (Note: She was credited as « Madame Ismaël de Bruxelles »)
- Le cœur et la main by Charles Lecocq, 28 January 1887
- Joséphine vendue par ses sœurs by Victor Roger, 25 February 1887
- Liederick, 24 February 1888
- Patrie ! by Émile Paladilhe, 6 March 1888
- Mam'zelle Nitouche by Hervé, 22 March 1888

Source : Historique complet du théâtre royal d’Anvers, unless otherwise indicated

== Bibliography ==
- de Gers, Arthur (1913). Historique complet du théâtre royal d'Anvers, 1804-1913 (digitized images). Antwerp: De Vos et Van der Groen. Accessible via the University of Toronto, Robarts Library.
- Heylli, Georges; et al. (1876–1891). Gazette anecdotique, littéraire, artistique et bibliographique (digitized images) (in French). Paris: Librairie des bibliophiles. Accessible via the University of Toronto, Robarts Library.
- Isnardon, Jacques (1890). Le Théâtre de la Monnaie, depuis sa fondation jusqu'à nos jours (digitized images). Brussels: Schott frères éditeurs. Accessible via Gallica.
- "Les Temps". 1861–1942. Accessible via Gallica.
