= Jean Périer =

French opera singer (1869–1954)

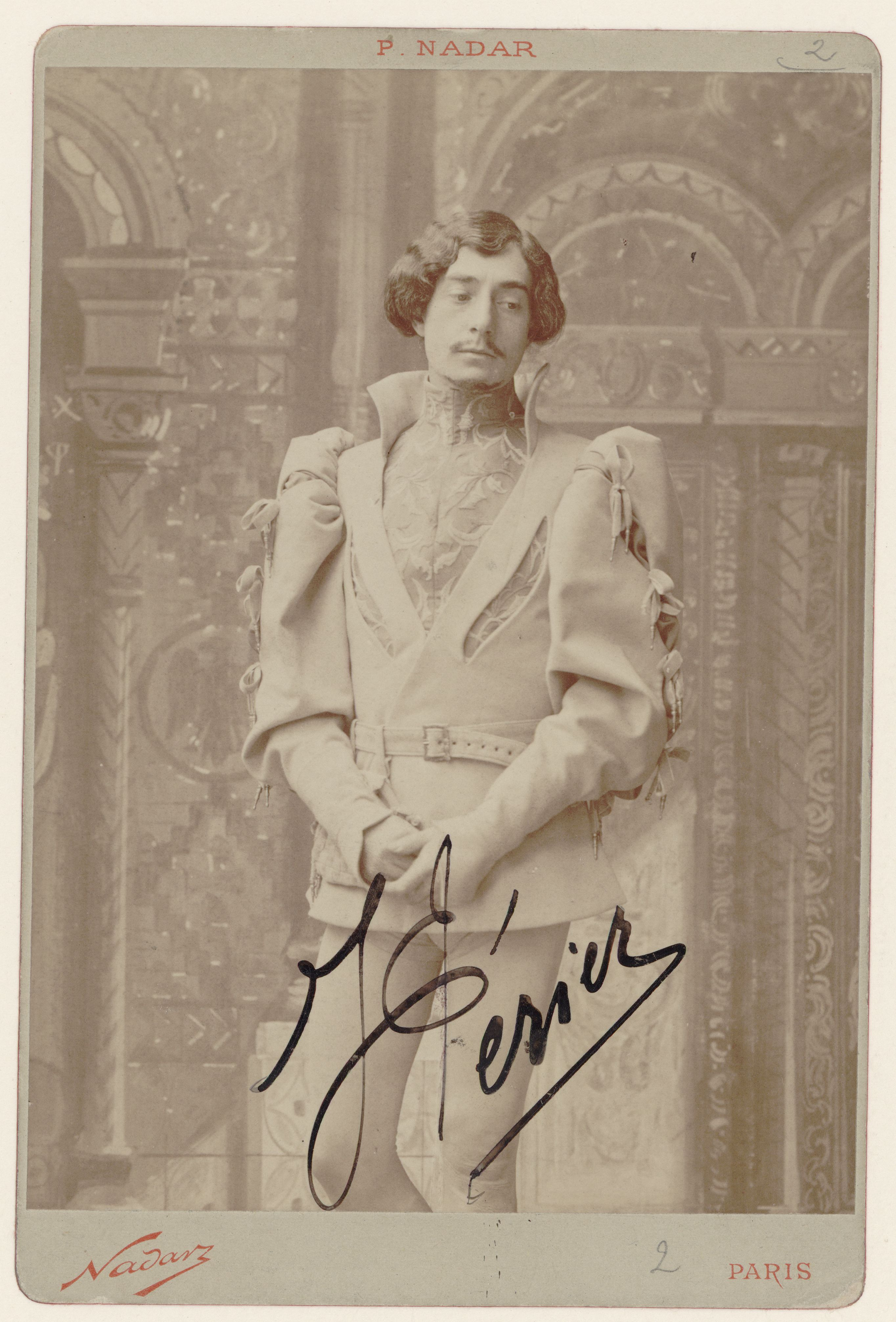
Jean Périer as Pelléas in Debussy's Pelléas et Mélisande

Jean (Alexis) Périer (2 February 1869 – 3 November 1954) was a French operatic baryton-martin and actor. Although he sang principally within the operetta repertoire, Périer did portray a number of opera roles; mostly within operas by Wolfgang Amadeus Mozart and Giacomo Puccini. His career was almost entirely centered in Paris and he had a long association with the Opéra-Comique. He sang in a large number of world premieres, most notably originating the role of Pelléas in Debussy's Pelléas et Mélisande in 1902. In addition to his opera career, Périer appeared in several films between 1900 and 1938.

== Biography ==
Jean Périer was born in Paris, the son of Belgian parents. His father was an opera singer and repetiteur. After initially working at the Credit Lyonnais, he became a pupil of Émile-Alexandre Taskin (opéra comique) and Romain Bussine (singing) at the Paris Conservatoire, winning first prizes in both in 1892. He made his debut as Monostatos in Mozart's The Magic Flute at the Opéra-Comique later that year on 16 December. He continued to perform at that opera house until 1920, with the exception of the years 1894 through 1900 when he principally sang at the Théâtre des Bouffes Parisiens and other Parisian theatres specializing in operetta.

Although he performed a great deal of operetta, he also sang a number of operatic roles including the title role in Don Giovanni, Lescaut in Manon Lescaut, and Scarpia in Tosca. His career was almost entirely centred in Paris, particularly at the Opéra-Comique, where he notably created the role of Pelléas in Debussy's Pelléas et Mélisande. He repeated the role of Pelléas at the Manhattan Opera Company in 1908 and at the Opéra de Monte-Carlo. He appeared in numerous other world premieres, most notably Ramiro in Ravel's L'heure espagnole (1911) and leading roles in Messager's Véronique (1898) and Fortunio (1907).

Périer's other roles at the Opéra-Comique included Clément Marot in La Basoche, Juliano in Le domino noir, Lindorf in Les contes d’Hoffmann, Lescaut in Manon, Ulysse in Télémaque, Laerte in Mignon, César in Les rendez-vous bourgeois, Caoudal in Sapho, Francois in Le Chemineau, Crispin in Le légataire universel and Auguste in L'enfant roi.

Although described as a baritone, he created roles for Debussy and Ravel in the Baryton-Martin register. His was a declamatory art, and he created convincing characters with the help of his clear diction and his ability as an actor. In addition to his opera career, he acted in several films between 1900 and 1938. His voice on one of the seven published recordings he made (Act 2 of Véronique, 1904) is described as dry and husky.

After retiring in 1938, Périer worked as an acting and singing teacher in Paris. He died in Neuilly-sur-Seine, Paris on 3 November 1954. His brother was the French popular singer Camille Périer "Kam-Hill", 1856–1935.

== Roles created by Périer ==
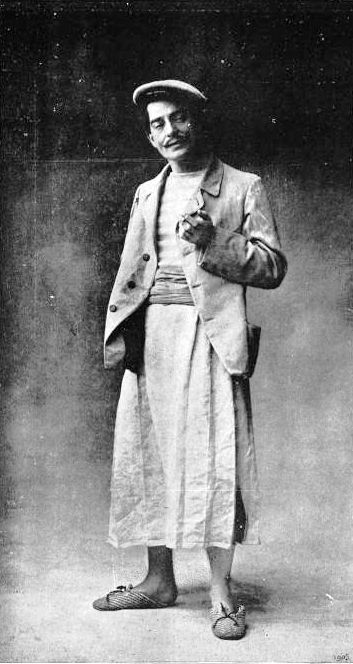
Jean Périer as Auguste in Alfred Bruneau's L'Enfant Roi

Among roles which Périer created are:

- Arogagyne in Phryné by Camille Saint-Saëns in 1893
- André (Massèna) in Rivoli by André Wormser in 1896
- Florestan de Valaincourt in Véronique by André Messager in 1898
- Brutus in Shakespeare! by Gaston Serpette in 1899
- Pelléas in Pelléas et Mélisande by Claude Debussy in 1902 (Périer also sang Pelléas in the American premiere in New York, 1908).
- Giorgio d'Ast in La reine Fiammette by Xavier Leroux in 1903
- Auguste in L'Enfant Roi by Alfred Bruneau in 1905
- Hans in Hans le joueur de flûte by Louis Ganne in 1906
- The title role in Don Procopio by Georges Bizet in 1906
- Landry in Messager's Fortunio in 1907
- Ramiro in L'heure espagnole by Maurice Ravel in 1911
- The title role in Mârouf, savetier du Caire by Henri Rabaud in 1914
- Jérôme Coignard in La reine Pédauque by Levadé in 1920
- Duparquet in Ciboulette by Reynaldo Hahn in 1923
- Livran in Quand on est trois by Szulc in 1925
- Le Marquis in Mannequins by Szulc in 1925.

Périer also played the speaking role of Brother Dominic in the premiere of Honegger's dramatic oratorio Jeanne d'Arc au Bûcher in Basle on 12 May 1938, with Ida Rubinstein.

== Films ==
In the second half of his career Périer appeared in over 30 French feature films, including:

- Monsieur Don Quichotte (1910)
- Oliver Twist (1910)
- Manon (1910)
- Vingt ans après (1922)
- Poker d'as (1927)
- About an Inquest (1931) Original title Autour d'une enquête
- The Night at the Hotel (1932) Original title Une nuit à l'hôtel
- Prenez garde à la peinture (1932)
- The Beautiful Adventure (1932) Original title La belle aventure
- Simone Is Like That (1933) Original title Simone est comme ça
- The Path to Happiness (1934) Original title Le chemin du bonheur
- King of the Camargue (1935)
- Pasteur (1935)
- Martha (1936)
- Forty Little Mothers (1936) Original title Le mioche
- Compliments of Mister Flow (1936)
- Les Amants traqués (1936)
- Le Mioche (1936)
- Parisian Life (1936)
- Boissière (1937)
- L'Affaire du courrier de Lyon (1937)
- The Novel of Werther (1938)
- Rail Pirates (1938) Original title Les pirates du rail
- Three Waltzes (1938)
- La Rue sans joie (1938)
- Remontons les Champs-Élysées (1938)
- Légions d'honneur (1938)
- Gibraltar (1938)
- La Mort du cygne (1938)
- Entente cordiale (1939)
- Le Destin fabuleux de Désirée Clary (1941)
- Le Brigand gentilhomme (1941)
- Mademoiselle Béatrice (1943)
- Les Roquevillard (1943)
- The Man Who Sold His Soul (1943)
- Un seul amour (1943)
- The Ménard Collection (1944)
- The Seventh Door (1947)
- Le Comédien (1947, Périer plays himself)
