= La reine Fiammette =

1903 opera in four acts by Xavier Leroux

La reine Fiammette is an opera in four acts by composer Xavier Leroux. The opera uses a French language libretto by Catulle Mendès which is based on Mendès's 1898 work of the same name, a conte dramatique in six acts set in Renaissance Italy.

== Performance history ==
The opera's premiere was given by the Opéra-Comique at the Salle Favart in Paris on 23 December 1903. The production was directed by Albert Carré and conducted by André Messager. The United States premiere of the work was given at the Metropolitan Opera in New York City on 24 January 1919. That production was directed by Richard Ordynski, conducted by Pierre Monteux, and starred Geraldine Farrar as Orlanda, Hipolito Lazaro as Danièlo, Adamo Didur as Giorgio, Léon Rothier as César, and Flora Perini as Pantasilée. Up to the Second World War the opera received 59 performances at the Opéra-Comique. In its 1910 revival at the Opéra-Comique Marguerite Carré was Orlanda and Léon Beyle Danielo, Fernand Francell Giorgio and Félix Vieuille Sforza.

== Roles ==
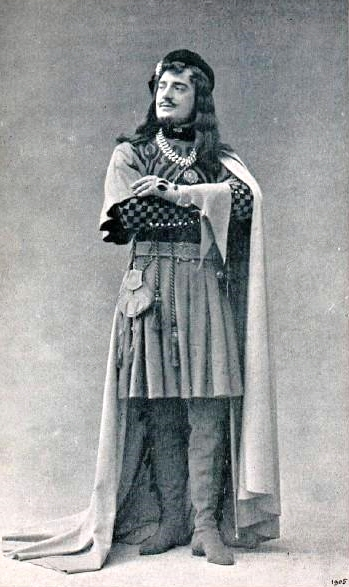
Jean Périer as Giorgio d'Ast

Role	Voice type	Premiere cast (Conductor: André Messager)
Orlanda (Fiammette)	soprano	Mary Garden
Danièlo	tenor	Adolphe Maréchal
Giorgio d'Ast	baritone	Jean Périer
Cardinal César Sforza	baritone	André Allard
Pantasilée	soprano	Jeanne Tiphaine
Lucagnolo	baritone	Jean Delvoye
Viola	soprano	Lucy Vauthrin
Violette	soprano	Rachel Launay
Violine	soprano	Angèle Pornot
Jean Césano	tenor	Jahn
Pomone	soprano	Daffeyte
Michela	soprano	Delmai
Jean Vasari	tenor	Minvielle
Agramente	mezzo-soprano	Jeanne Passama
Pompeo Cortèz	baritone	Henri Dutilloy
Castiglione	tenor	Ernest Carbonne
Chiarina	soprano	Alice Cortez
Angioletta	mezzo-soprano	Yvonne Dumesnil
Prosecutor	bass	Jean Giraud
1st Youth	mezzo-soprano	Yvonne Dumesnil
2nd Youth	soprano	Marguerite Giraud-Carré
