= Marguerite Olagnier =

French vocalist, composer and poet (1844-1906)

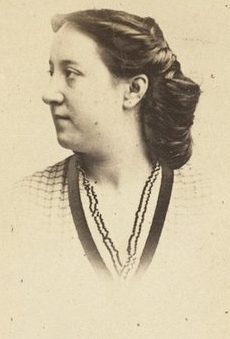
Marguerite Olagnier (1844–1906)

Marguerite Olagnier (née Joly) (1844 – 12 September 1906) was a French vocalist, composer and poet who began her musical life singing at the Théâtre des Variétées in Paris.

== Career ==
While traveling in Egypt with her husband Eugène Olagnier, it is believed that she wrote both words and music of an "exotic opera" in four acts, Le Saïs, which "aimed at the fantasies and desires of women." It was staged at the Théâtre de la Renaissance in Paris on 18 December 1881 and was later performed by Victor Capoul, an Opéra-Comique tenor.

Later in life she directed her own company, the Théâtre de l'Oratorio, in weekly performances of 18th- and 19th-century oratorios. Olagnier also composed a number of songs and two more operas, Le Persan and Lilipa, which were never performed. Her only known novel was never finished.
