= Kam-Hill =

French cabaret performer and singer

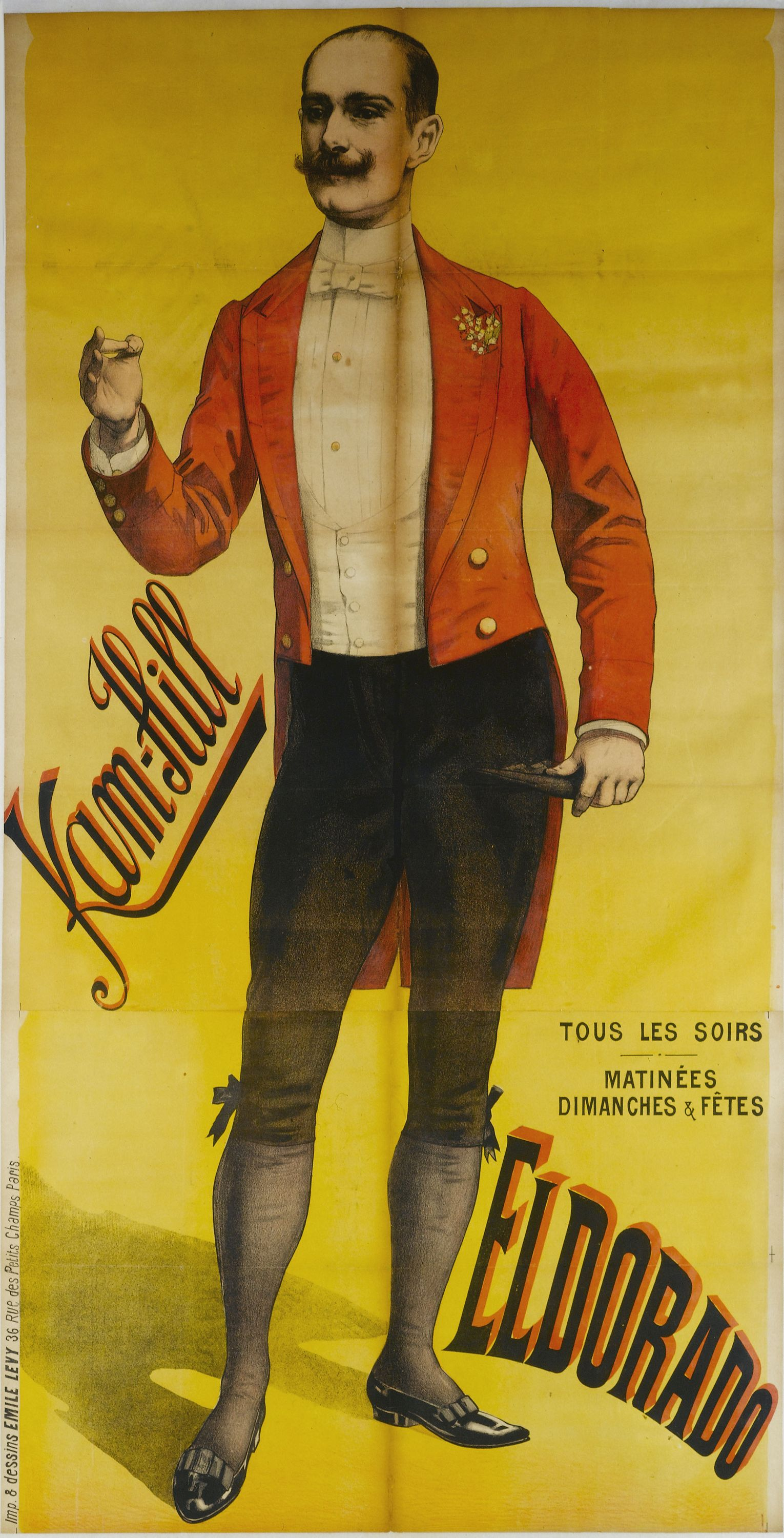
Kam-Hill in 1890.

Camille Périer (1856–1935), known by his stage name Kam-Hill, was a French cabaret performer and singer in Paris. He was the son of a musician at the Opéra-Comique and brother of the famous opera and operetta singer Jean Périer.

He began to sing from the lyric repertoire around 1885 in salons, before making his real debut at the Gaîté Montparnasse in 1890 in his trademark bizarre costume resembling a rider, with red coat, black silk trousers, a top hat and white gloves; he even sang on horseback at the Nouveau Cirque in Paris. Yvette Guilbert and Kam-Hill appeared together regularly, often singing songs by Tarride. He also appeared at the Eldorado, the La Scala, the Ambassadeurs, and the Folies Bergère.

Guilbert and Kam-Hill dominated the café-concert in Paris in the last decade of the 19th century. He recorded several cylinders for Pathé between 1905 and 1907 (some of which have been re-issued on CD), before retiring in 1910.
