= Jean Delvoye =

Belgian baritone

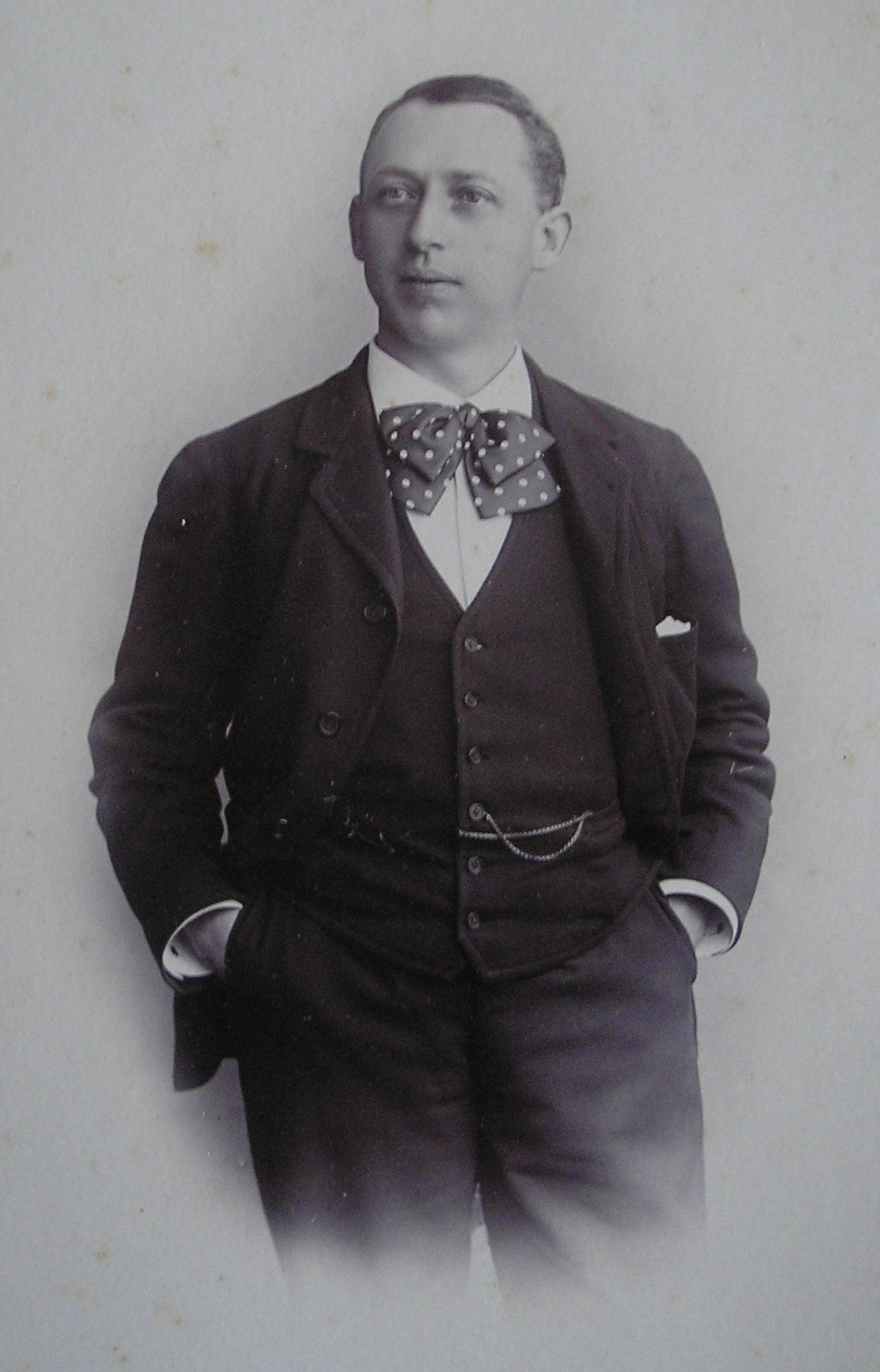
Jean Delvoye Portrait

Jean Delvoye (25 November 1854, in Liège – 13 June 1938, in Ougrée) was a Belgian baritone, who, after working in the French provinces, enjoyed a long career in Paris, centred on the Opéra-Comique, and left some recordings representative of his repertoire.

== Life and career ==
Delvoye studied singing at the Conservatoire de Liège under Georges Bonheur, obtaining a 2nd prize after only five months. He also won two first prizes in the "déclamation lyrique" class of baritone Sébastien Carman.

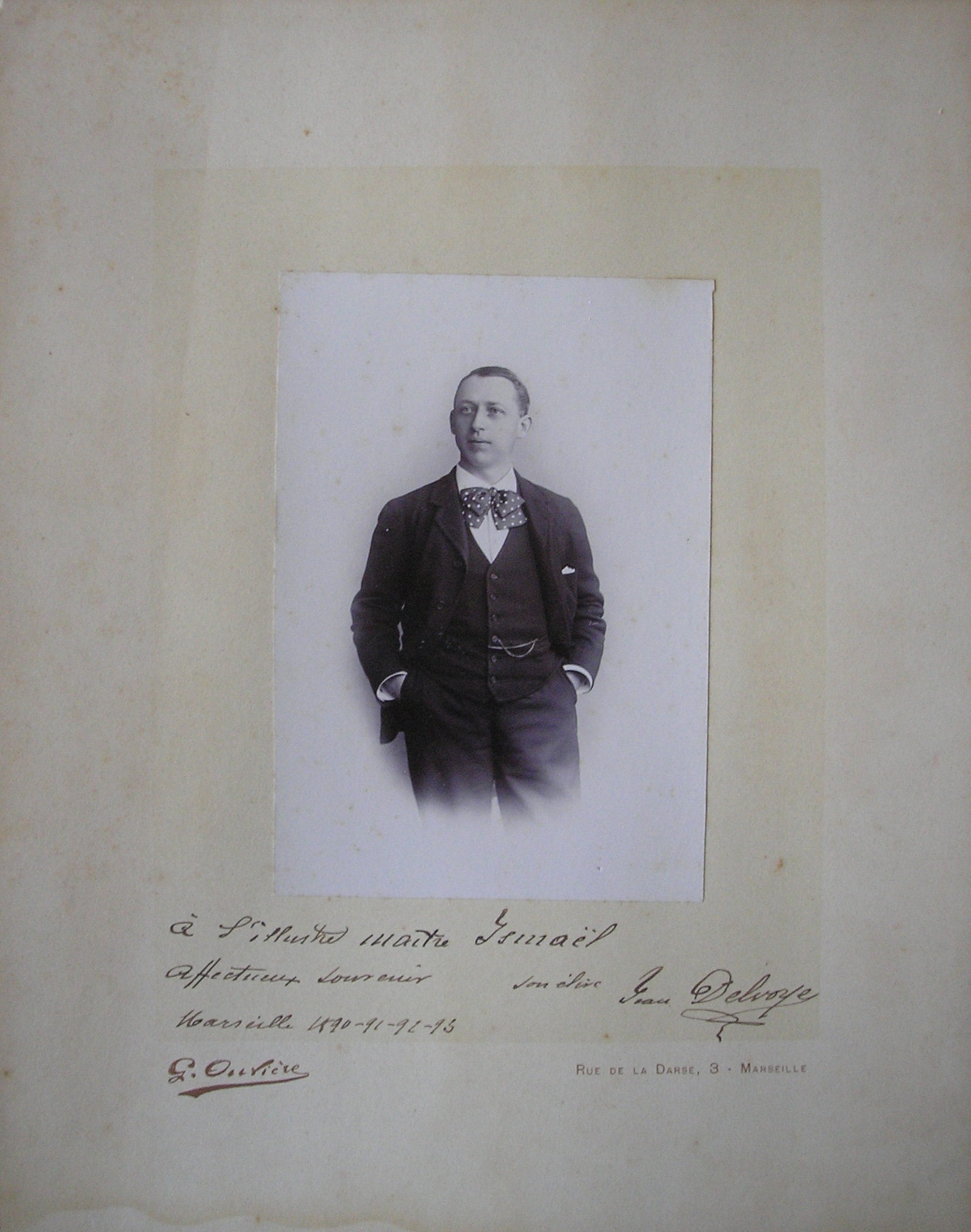
Photograph of Jean Delvoye by Ouvière, dedicated to his teacher Ismaël, c1893

Around 1881 he appeared in several performances of opéras comiques at the Salle de Fontainebleau in his home city. He sang in Dunkerque during the 1886-1887 season, before moving on to Angers (1887-1888) then Nantes for two seasons, singing Zurga in Les pêcheurs de perles, and appearing as well in Les dragons de Villars, La Béarnaise, Si j'étais roi and Le Roi d'Ys. He spent 1890 to 1893 in Marseille, where he also took lessons from Ismaël as well as appearing in local premieres of Le Rêve et La Basoche. Later he sang in Nice then in Lyon, where he was praised for his superb method, stunning virtuosity, and his Beckmesser was singled out for praise.

His Paris début was at the Théâtre du Château d'Eau on 27 October 1898 as Ourrias in Mireille. At the Salle Favart, created Céleste (the role of Mazurier), le Chemineau (Thomas), Circé (Politès), La Danseuse de Pompéi (Philippe), La Fille de Tabarin (Frère Eloi), Le Follet (Jeannic), Les Fugitifs (Méraudon), L'Heure Espagnole (Inigo), Télémaque (Ménélas), Mârouf (Vizir), La Marseillaise (Moreau), Myrtil (Probulos), La Petite Maison (Dominique), La Reine Fiammette (Lucagnolo), La Revanche d'Iris (Diogène), Sanga (Gauchut), Le Secret de Maître Cornille (Cornille), Solange (le Maire de Saint-Dié), Titania (Mathieu), Les Visitandines (Frontin), Feminissima (le Précepteur) and sang in major revivals and local premieres of Hansel et Gretel (le Père), Macbeth (le Portier) and Tosca (le Sacristain),

He also appeared in le Barbier de Séville (Figaro, Bartholo), La Basoche (Duc de Longueville), Carmen (Escamillo), Cavalleria rusticana (Alfio), Le Déserteur (Montauciel), Don Juan (Mazetto), Don Pasquale (Malatesta), Les Dragons de Villars (Bellamy), Le Farfadet (Marcelin), L'Irato (Scapin), Falstaff (Ford), Fortunio (Maître André), Le Jongleur de Notre-Dame (Boniface), Lakmé (Frédéric), Louise (Chansonnier), Madame Butterfly (Sharpless), Le Maître de Chapelle (Barnabé), Maître Wolfram (Wolfram), Manon (Brétigny, Lescaut), Les Noces de Jeannette (Jean), L'Ouragan (Gervais), Le Roi d'Ys (Karnac), Sapho (Césaire), La Traviata (d'Orbel), and La Bohème (Marcel).

Antoine Delvoye published an article (in French) entitled 'Un grand artiste wallon : le baryton Jean Delvoye (1854-1938) in La Vie Wallonne, Tome 53 (1979), p. 175-219.

== Recordings ==
He made a significant number of recordings of individual songs and arias, as well as some duets with other leading singers. They cover various national schools: French or Paris-based composers Adam, Carafa, Flotow, Gounod, Grétry, Grisart, Isouard, Maillart, Massé, Massenet, Messager, Meyerbeer, Planquette, Reyer, Saint-Saëns and Thomas; the Belgian Gevaert; Italians Donizetti, Paër and Rossini; and Germans Mozart and Humperdinck. Two of these were reissued on CD as part of the Becko set of historical Belgian singers.
