= Ernest Carbonne =

French opera singer

Raymond Jean-Baptiste Ernest Carbonne (30 July 1860 in Toulouse – 1924) was a French tenor and stage director who had a long association with the Opéra-Comique in Paris.

== Life and career ==
Carbonne studied at the Conservatoire de Toulouse, gaining first prizes in opéra comique and acting in 1887. He was a pupil of Achard and Bax at the Paris Conservatoire, winning first prize for opéra comique in 1889.

He made his debut at the Paris Opéra-Comique on 15 January 1890 as Sylvain in les Dragons de Villars and went on to sing many roles there. He created roles in La Basoche, La Carmélite, Louise, La reine Fiammette, as well as appearing in the Paris premieres of Le jongleur de Notre Dame, Falstaff and La Navarraise. Other roles included Steersman in The Flying Dutchman, Évandre in Alceste, Almaviva in The Barber of Seville, Birotteau in Le Caïd, Dickson in La dame blanche, Daniel in Le chalet, Horace in Le domino noir, Lorenzo in Fra Diavolo, Vincent in Mireille, Nicias in Phryné, Benoit in Le roi l’a dit, Tricolin in Le toréador, and the count in La traviata.

From 1906 to 1913, and from 1919 to 1922, Carbonne was ‘directeur de la scene’ at the Opéra-Comique, responsible among other productions for the premiere of Ravel's L’heure espagnole.

In 1911, Carbonne became the inaugural head of the 'Amicale des Régisseurs de Théâtre' upon its foundation in Paris.
