= Mârouf, savetier du Caire =

1914 opéra comique by Henri Rabaud

Mârouf, savetier du Caire (Marouf, Cobbler of Cairo) is an opéra comique in five acts by the French composer Henri Rabaud. The libretto, by Lucien Nepoty, is based on a tale from the Arabian Nights. Mârouf was first performed at the Opéra-Comique, Paris, on 15 May 1914. The premiere was a great success and Mârouf became Rabaud's most popular opera. The score makes great use of oriental colour.

== Performance history ==
The Western Hemisphere premiere of Mârouf was given at the Teatro Colón in Buenos Aires on 24 July 1917, with Armand Crabbé as Mârouf, Ninon Vallin as Saamcheddine, and Marcel Journet as the Sultan, conducted by Gino Marinuzzi. The United States premiere was given at the Metropolitan Opera on 19 December 1917, with Giuseppe De Luca in the title role, Frances Alda as Princess Saamcheddine, and Pierre Monteux conducting; as there is no big aria for the soprano lead, Alda (wife of the Met's director Giulio Gatti-Casazza), protested, but with Monteux's help Rabaud was persuaded to develop a melodic fragment into an aria for her, "averting further strife" with the singer. The Viennese premiere was at the Vienna State Opera on 24 January 1929, with Josef Kalenberg and Margit Angerer ("who received the most applause") and Franz Schalk conducting.

The Opéra-Comique presented a new production in 2013 by Jérôme Deschamps, with Jean-Sébastien Bou in the title role, conducted by Alain Altinoglu. That production was revived there in 2018.

== Roles ==
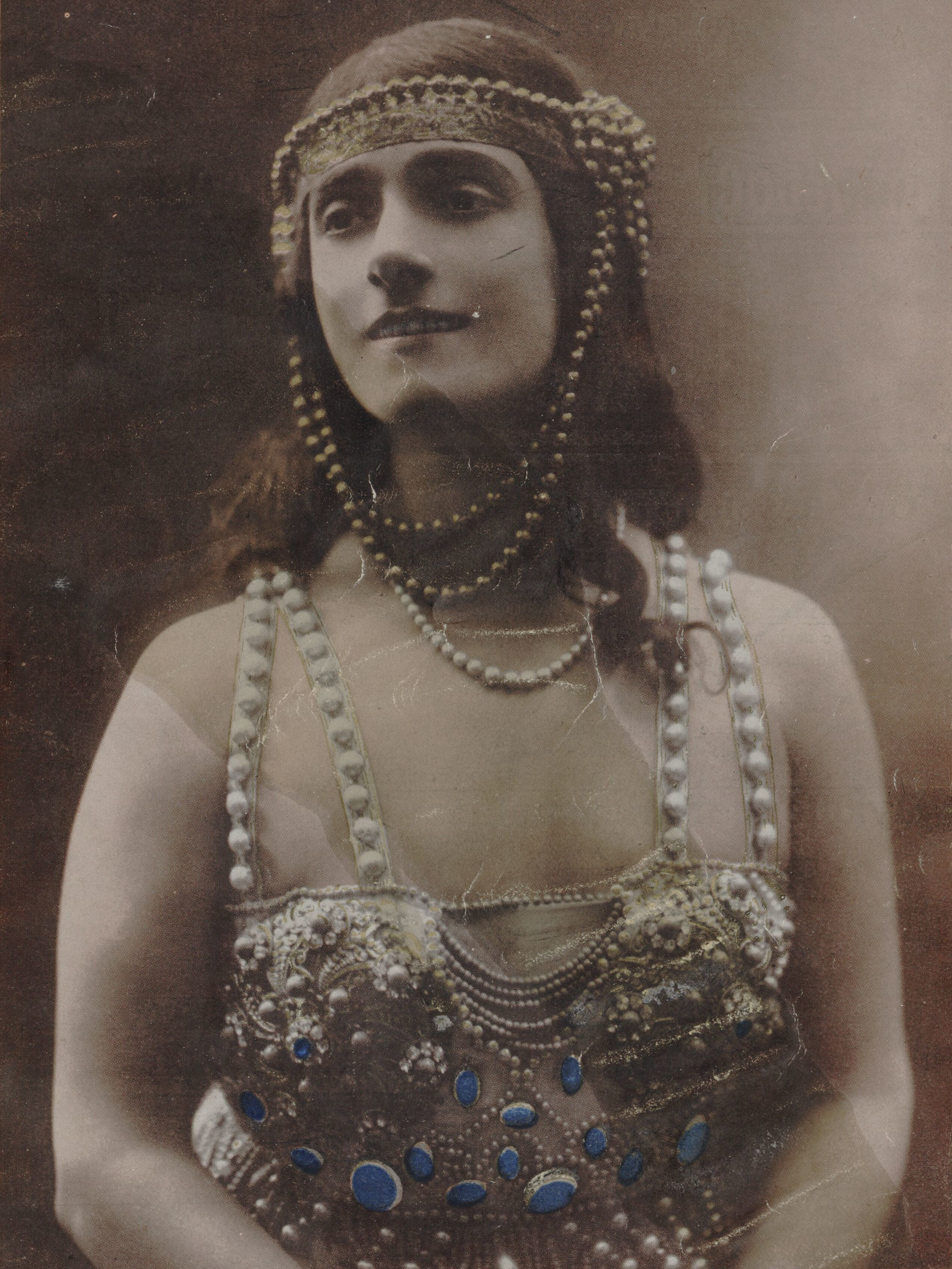
Marthe Davelli as Princess Saamcheddine

Roles, voice types, premiere cast
Role	Voice type	Premiere cast, 15 May 1914 Conductor: François Ruhlmann
Mârouf	baritone	Jean Périer
Fattoumah, his wife	soprano	Jeanne Tiphaine
The Sultan of Khaïtân	bass	Félix Vieuille
Princess Saamcheddine, his daughter	soprano	Marthe Davelli
His vizier	bass	Jean Delvoye
Ali	bass	Daniel Vigneau
Fellah/Genie	tenor	Georges-Louis Mesmaecker
First merchant	tenor	Maurice Cazeneuve
Second merchant	tenor	Éric Audoin
First policeman	tenor	Pierre Delager
Second policeman	baritone	Corbière
Chief sailor/First muezzin	tenor	Eugène de Creus
Second muezzin	bass	Thibault
Donkey-driver	tenor	Donval
First mamluk	baritone	Jean Reymond
Second mamluk	bass	Brun
Pâtissier/Ahmed	bass	Louis Azéma
Kadı	bass	Paul Payen
ballerinas	silent	Sonia Pavloff, Germaine Dugué, Gina Luparia, Sallandri
ballerino	silent	Robert Quinault

== Synopsis ==
The henpecked cobbler Mârouf decides to join a group of sailors and travels to Khaïtân where he pretends to be a rich merchant awaiting the arrival of his caravan. The sultan is impressed and offers him the hand of his daughter Saamcheddine. Mârouf's deception is discovered and he flees, followed by the princess, who has fallen in love with him. They find a mysterious ring which gives Mârouf power over a magician. The magician grants Mârouf's wish for the caravan he boasted about to become reality. The sultan is appeased, pardons Mârouf and allows him to marry Saamcheddine.
