= La grand'tante =

Opera by Jules Massenet

- opéra comique by Jules Massenet
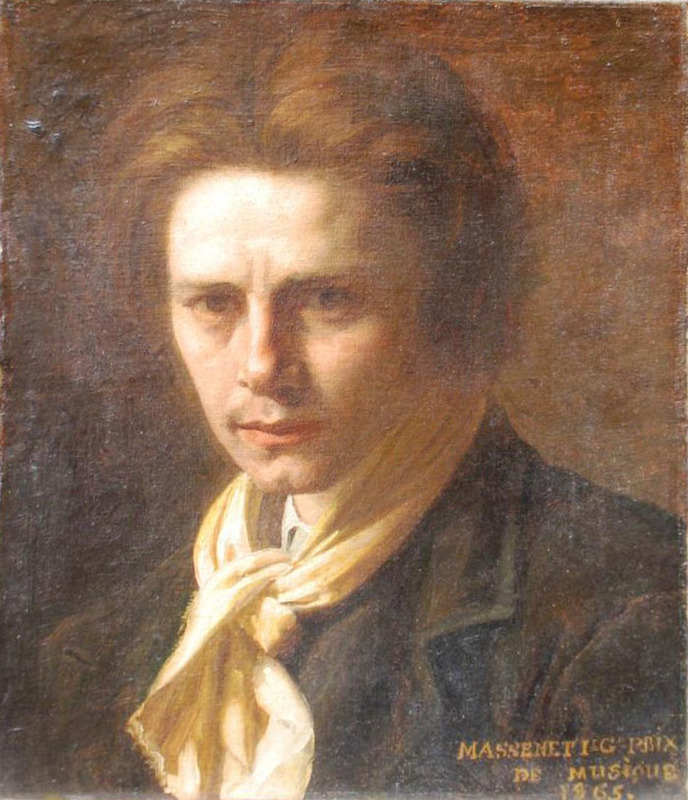
- The composer in the 1860s
- Translation: The great-aunt
- Librettist: Jules Adenis; Charles Grandvallet
- Language: French
- Premiere: 3 April 1867; Opéra-Comique, Paris

La grand'tante (The great-aunt) is an opéra comique in one act by Jules Massenet to a French libretto by Jules Adenis and Charles Grandvallet. It was first performed at the Opéra-Comique in Paris on 3 April 1867. Though not the first opera composed by Massenet, it was the first of his stage works to be mounted on the stage. The work consists of an overture followed by six vocal numbers (solos, duets and a final trio) with spoken dialogue in between.

== Roles ==
Roles, voice types, premiere cast
| Role | Voice type | Premiere cast, 3 April 1867 Conductor:Théophile Tilmant |
|---|---|---|
| Le Marquis de Kerdrel | tenor | Victor Capoul |
| Alice de Kerdrel | soprano | Marie Heilbronn |
| La Chevrette | soprano | Caroline Girard |

== Synopsis ==
The Marquis Guy de Kerdrel returns from his regiment in Africa to claim an inheritance from his late great-uncle, whom he had never met. He is unimpressed by the condition of the property he has inherited but is reassured by the thought that he can at least liquidate the asset at auction. That way he will have some compensation for his relative's frequent refusal, in letters signed with a characteristic monogram, to give the spendthrift soldier any money. Chevrette, the domestic, lets slip in conversation that the old Marquis had written a new will leaving everything to his widow but that Alice, the Marquise, had been so concerned that his last hours should not be troubled that she refused the notary access to get the document signed thus allowing the scapegrace great-nephew to inherit after all. Guy stretches out to sleep, planning to finish the business the following day. He catches a momentary glimpse of a beautiful girl, almost as if in a dream, and learns from Chevrette later that this must be the widow, whom Guy had imagined to be an old hag... he falls in love almost without hesitation.

Chevrette asks Guy if he might sell the portrait of his great-uncle to Alice as a keepsake of her husband, whom she loved as a father. Guy, now in love, indignantly declares that she may have it as a gift. Chevrette goes to give the good news to the widow and Guy slips into his great-uncle's room to have a look at this portrait and see what his relative looked like.

Guy hopes that the Marquise will continue to live in the castle but she refuses on the grounds that it no longer belongs to her. He mentions the second (unsigned) will, but she declares that she threw it into the fire. He then has the portrait that he promised her brought in from the adjoining room. To everyone's surprise, a document falls out from the frame - it is the famous second will, now signed with the old man's distinctive monogram. It turns out that Chevrette had salvaged the partly burned document from the fire and jammed it into the frame, naïvely believing that if she prayed hard enough to Saint Gildas, the old man would return from the after-life to sign it. Alice is sure that Guy has forged the signature but he will admit nothing. He leaves the mourning widow to her property with the assurance that he will soon return and claim her.
