= Adrien Barthe =

French composer (1828–1898)

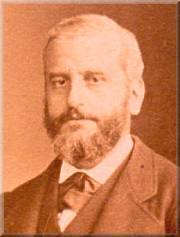
- Born: July 7, 1828; Bayonne, France
- Died: 13 August 1898 (aged 70)
- Occupations: Composer, teacher

Adrien Barthe, born Grat-Norbert Barthe (7 June 1828 – 13 August 1898), was a French composer.

== Career ==
Born in Bayonne, Barthe studied music under Aimé Leborne at the Paris Conservatory. An early composition, Francesca de Rimini, was lauded by the Rome Institute, and his subsequent cantatas Judith and Don Carlos were well received. Performances of Aubade in 1893 by conductor Paul Taffanel were popular with audiences to the extent that Taffanel published praise of Barthe: "your delightful work earned us our first success". Moving from composition to theatre work, Barthe's La Fiancée d'Abydos appeared on stage in Paris and Rome, starring Jean-Vital Jammes, however, flaws in the composition persuaded Barthe to retire shortly after December 1865, becoming a teacher.

He died in Asnières-sur-Seine, leaving behind several unpublished manuscripts.

== Selected works ==
Below is a list of works published by Barthe during his lifetime.

- Aubade
- La Fiancée d'abydos, opera in 4 acts (libretto:Jules Adenis)
- Pays Basque. Esquisses musicales, for piano 4-hands
- Six Piéces, for oboe and piano. Contains: Idylle; Legende; Bourrée; Le Berger; Couvre feu; Scherzo
