= Les rendez-vous bourgeois =

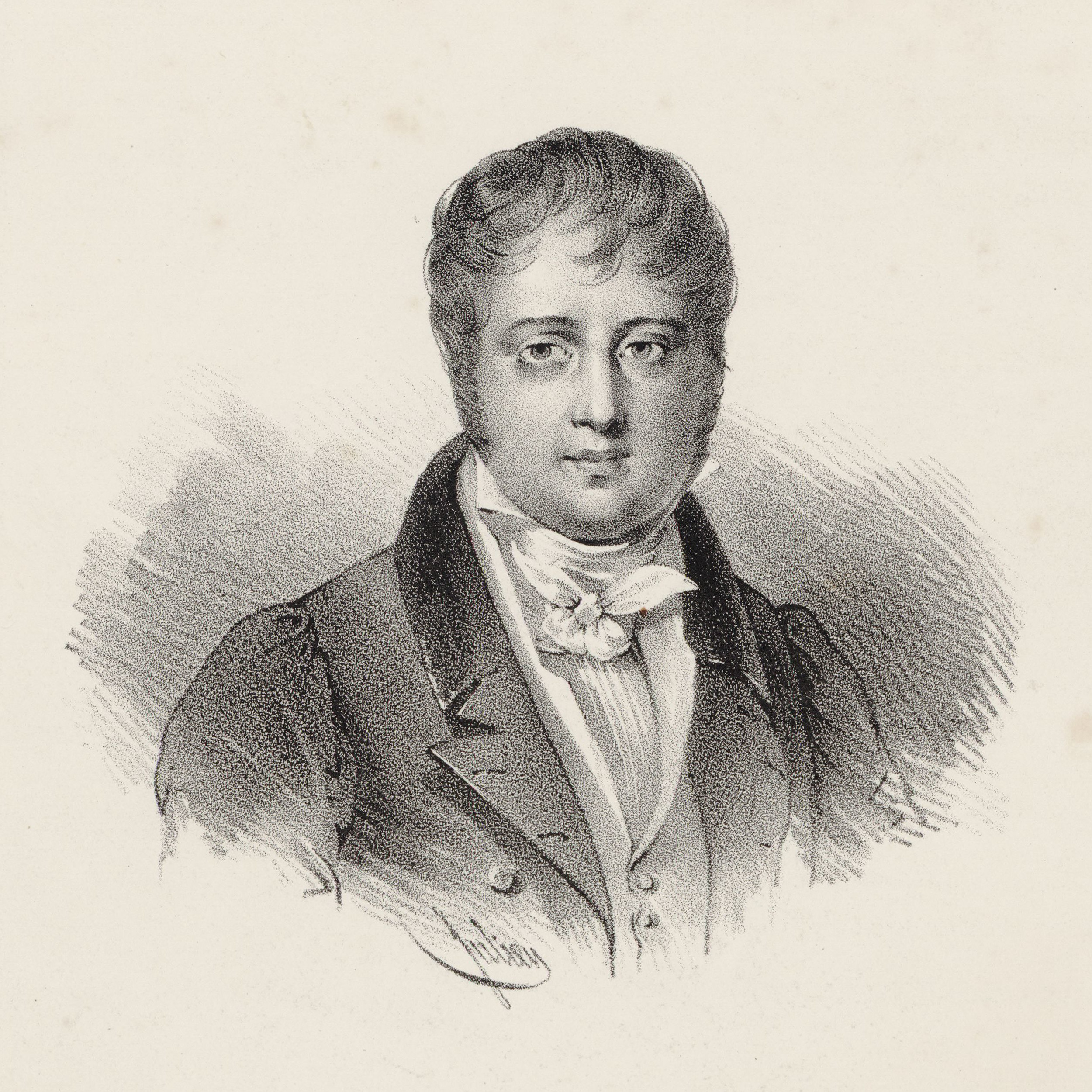
Nicolas Isouard

Les rendez-vous bourgeois (French pronunciation: [le ʁɑ̃de vu buʁʒwa]) is an opéra bouffon in one act by Nicolas Isouard to a French libretto by François-Benoît Hoffmann, in the form of an opéra comique with spoken dialogue between the musical numbers. The work was first performed by the Opéra-Comique at the Salle Feydeau in Paris on 9 May 1807.

It became a regular part of the Opéra-Comique repertoire, being performed over 760 times there up to the 1930s. The score consists of an overture and ten vocal numbers. Once in the public domain it was mounted at the Bouffes-Parisiens and the Théâtre de la Gaîté, then the Théâtre de la Renaissance on 11 March 1879 for 25 performances, with a cast including Jean-François Berthelier as Bertrand, Jane Hading as Charles and Mily-Meyer as Louise. Other notable singers to have sung in the opera include Alice Ducasse, Barnolt (Bertrand), Jean Vieuille, Galli-Marié (Cesar), Esther Chevalier (Julie), and Félix Vieuille (Dugravier).

== Roles ==
Roles, voice types, premiere cast
Role	Voice type	Premiere cast, 9 May 1807
Julie, maid of Reine and Louise	mezzo-soprano	Jeanne-Charlotte Schrœder, called 'Mme Saint Aubin'
Reine, daughter of Dugravier	soprano	Desirée Péllet
Louise, niece of Dugravier	soprano	Marie-Lucile Moreau
Dugravier, a retired timber merchant	bass	Antoine Juliet 'père'
Jasmin, valet, in love with Julie	baritone	Jean-Pierre Moreau
Charles, lover of Louise	tenor	Paul Dutreck called 'Paul'
Bertrand, Dugravier’s valet	tenor	Paul Lesage
César, lover of Reine	tenor	Auguste Huet

== Synopsis ==
The action takes place in 1807 in the living room of a country house, near the forest of Bondy.

Dugravier lives with his daughter Reine, his niece Louise and his servants Julie and Bertrand. The latter is in love with Julie but she favours Jasmin, a valet in a nearby house, visiting the Dugravier home.

Dugravier decides to go to Paris with Bertrand to arrange marriages for Reine and Louise with the sons of two rich gentlemen. They depart at nightfall, through the bandit-ridden forest.

With Dugravier gone, Louise confides to Julie that she has a lover, Charles, with whom she has an assignation that night, while Reine confesses that she too is to meet her own César. Charles, César and Jasmin hide upon the unexpected return of Dugravier, who says that he has met brigands on his way. The three young men then escape through a window, but return shortly after, claiming to have fought off the imaginary bandits. They introduce themselves as the two sons of the Parisians, and Dugravier gratefully agrees to all three marriages.
