= Félix Vieuille =

French opera singer

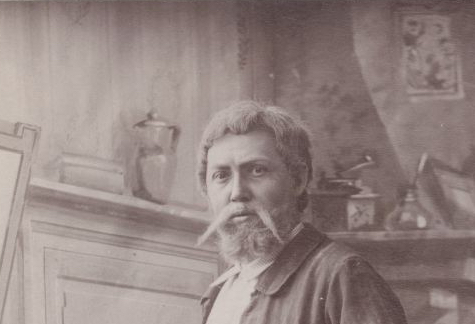

Félix Vieuille (French pronunciation: [feliks vjœj]; 15 October 1872 in Saujon – 28 February 1953 in Saujon) was a French operatic bass who sang for more than four decades with the Opéra-Comique in Paris during the first half of the twentieth century. He created roles in numerous world premieres, most notably portraying Arkel in the original production of Claude Debussy's Pelléas et Mélisande in 1902 which he went on to sing 208 times at that house. He possessed a rich voice and a solid technique which helped sustain his career for a long time. His voice is preserved on a number of recordings made on the Odeon, Lyrophon, and Beka labels.

== Biography ==
Vieuille studied at the Conservatoire de Paris with teachers Léon Achard and Alfred Auguste Giraudet. He made his debut as Leporello in Mozart's Don Giovanni in 1897 at Aix-les-Bains. He joined the Paris Opéra-Comique in 1898 where he initially sang supporting roles until he was made a leading bass in 1902, with his first major role being Arkel in the world première of Debussy's Pelléas et Mélisande. Debussy was evidently pleased with Vieuille's interpretation of Arkël; in a letter to Dufranne (who sang Golaud) at the time of an early revival, he wrote "you and Vieuille are almost the only two who have maintained your understanding of my artistic aims".

Vieuille continued to perform in leading roles at the Opéra-Comique up until 1940. He notably created roles in more than twenty world premieres, including Gustave Charpentier's Louise (1900), Henri Rabaud's La fille de Roland (1904), Paul Dukas's Ariane et Barbe-Bleue (1907), Bloch's Macbeth (1910), Rabaud's Mârouf, savetier du Caire (1914), and Milhaud's Le pauvre matelot (1927) to name just a few. He also sang in the Paris premières of Fauré’s Pénélope and Rimsky-Korsakov’s The Snow Maiden (Grandfather Frost, 1908). He continued to sing Arkel in performances of Pelléas et Mélisande at the Opéra-Comique up to 1933, appearing alongside his nephew the baritone Jean Vieuille (as the doctor) from 1930 to 1933. At this point Vieuille had taken up teaching and his nephew was one of his many pupils.

In addition to his appearance at the Opéra-Comique, Vieuille also appeared at the Manhattan Opera House in New York City from 1908 to 1909 at the invitation of Oscar Hammerstein I. While there he notably sang Arkel in the United States premiere of Pelléas et Mélisande among other roles. He also sang in a few productions with Zurich Opera in 1917.

== Roles created ==
- Chiffonnier in Louise (Charpentier) 1900
- Walter in Le Juif polonais (Erlanger) 1900
- Arkël in Pelléas et Mélisande (Debussy) 1902
- Charlemagne in La fille de Roland (Rabaud) 1904
- Jean-Pierre in Les pêcheurs de Saint-Jean (Widor) 1905
- Toussaint in L’Enfant Roi (Bruneau) 1905
- Le roi in Le roi aveugle (Février) 1906
- Eurylaque in Circé (Paul & Lucien Hillemacher) 1907
- Barbe-bleue in Ariane et Barbe-bleue (Dukas) 1907
- Maitre Pierre in Le chemineau (Leroux) 1907
- Etchemendy in Chiquito (Jean Nouguès) 1909
- Macduff in Macbeth (Bloch) 1910
- Mucien in Bérénice (Magnard) 1911
- Mattelinn in La lépreuse (Lazzari) 1912
- Chrestus in Danseuse di Pompéi (Jean Nouguès) 1912
- van Hulle in Le carilloneur (Leroux) 1913
- Sultan of Khaitan in Mârouf, savetier du Caire (Rabaud) 1914
- L'Evêque in Béatrice (Messager) 1917
- The priest Siang in Ping-Sin (Charles-Henri Maréchal) 1918
- Philippe Strozzi in Lorenzaccio (Ernest Moret) 1920
- Estéban in Dans l'ombre de la cathédrale (Hüe) 1921
- Father-in-law in Le pauvre matelot (Milhaud) 1927
- Jonathas in La peau de Chagrin (Charles Levadé) 1929
- Don Pédro in Le sicilien (Omer Letorey) 1930.

== Recordings ==
Félix Vieuille made several recordings. including some unissued excerpts from Faust with Enrico Caruso, Geraldine Farrar, and Emilio de Gogorza in 1908.
