= Ferdinand Poise =

French composer

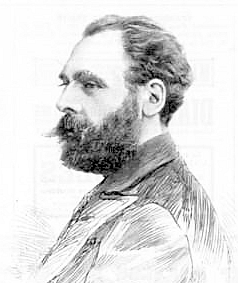
Ferdinand Poise

Jean Alexandre Ferdinand Poise (3 June 1828 – 13 May 1892) was a French composer, mainly of opéra-comiques, for which he also frequently wrote the librettos.

== Career ==
Born in Nimes, Poise studied at the Conservatoire de Paris under the tutelage of Adolphe Adam, himself a pupil of Boieldieu. His first opera was "Bonsoir voisin" (1853), which established his career and remains his most enduring success since it is still performed in France and Belgium. He did not follow contemporary operetta trends, but preferred to remain in line with the 18th century opéra comique. Alphonse Daudet was his librettist for Les Charmeurs (1855) and Les Absents (1864).

In 1862, the cantata Nemausa was created, the libretto of which was written by Alfred de Montvaillant Le Roi Don Pèdre (1857) and Le Corricolo (1868) were failures, but Poise, drawing inspiration from the works of the late 17th and 18th centuries, went on to create quality works: Les Deux billets (1870) after Florian, Les Trois souhaits (1873) and the trilogy La Surprise de l'amour (1877), L'Amour médecin (1880) and Joli-Gilles (1884). Carmosine was a work that is in a different style from the others.

His contemporary Arnold Mortier portrayed him as "long, emaciated and funereal. Poise, who wrote such vivid and valiant scores, is, I am assured, one of the saddest men in Paris".

Poise died in Paris at age 63.

== Works ==
- Bonsoir voisin, staged on 18 September 1853 at the Théâtre Lyrique
- Les Charmeurs, staged on 17 March 1855 at the Théâtre Lyrique de Paris
- Thé de Polichinelle, staged on 4 March 1856 aut the Bouffes-Parisiens
- Le Roi Don Pèdre, staged on 30 September 1857
- Le Jardinier galant, staged on 4 March 1861 at the Théâtre national de l'Opéra-Comique
- La Poularde de Caux, staged on 17 May 1861 at the Palais Royal (in collaboration with Bazille, Clapisson, Gautier, Gevaert, Mangeant)
- Les Absents, staged on 26 October 1864 at the Théâtre de l'Opéra-Comique (libretto by Alphonse Daudet)
- Jean Noël, performed in 1865
- Les Moissoneurs (cantata), 15 August 1866
- Le Corricolo, staged on 28 November 1868 at the Théâtre de l'Opéra-Comique à Paris
- Les Deux billets, staged on 19 February 1870 at the Théâtre de l’Athénée
- Les Trois souhaits, staged on 29 October 1873 at the Théâtre de l'Opéra-Comique
- La Surprise de l'amour, staged on 31 October 1877 at the Théâtre de l'Opéra-Comique
- La Cigale et la fourmi, performed in 1877
- La Dame de compagnie, performed in 1877
- L'Amour médecin, staged on 20 December 1880 at the Théâtre de l'Opéra-Comique
- La Reine d'une heure
- Joli-Gilles, performed in 1884
- Le Médecin malgré lui, performed in 1887 in Paris
- Carmosine, performed in 1928 in Monte-Carlo

== Bibliography ==
- David Charlton: "Poise, Ferdinand", in: The New Grove Dictionary of Music and Musicians, ed. Stanley Sadie (London: Macmillan, 1980), vol. 15.

== Discography ==
- Les Absents. With Lina Dachary, Janine Capderou, Gérard Friedmann, Bernard Plantey, orchestra conducted by Pierre-Michel Le Conte: Musidisc 202102 (1CD) (with Joli Gilles).
- Joli-Gilles. With Lina Dachary, Monique Stiot, Raymond Amade, Aimé Doniat, orchestra conducted by Pierre-Michel Le Conte: Musidisc 202102 (1CD) (with Les Absents).
- La Surprise de l'amour. With Monique Stiot, Linda Felder, Gérard Friedmann, Aimé Doniat, orchestra conducted by Jean-Claude Hartemann: Musidisc 201832 (1CD) (with Les rendez-vous bourgeois by Nicolas Isouard)
