= Opéra de Marseille =

French opera company

Coordinates: 43°17′36″N 5°22′33″E

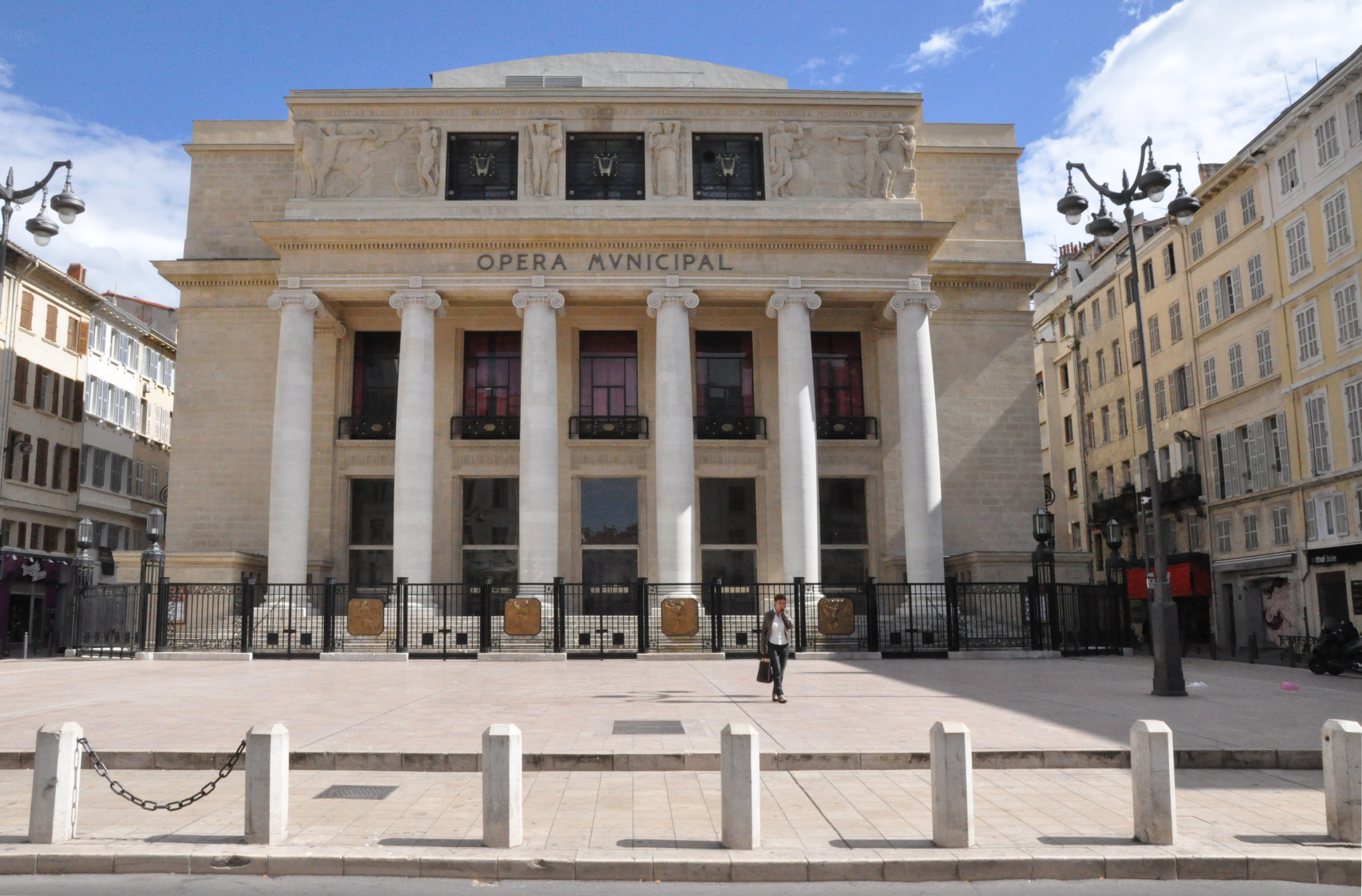
The Opéra de Marseille

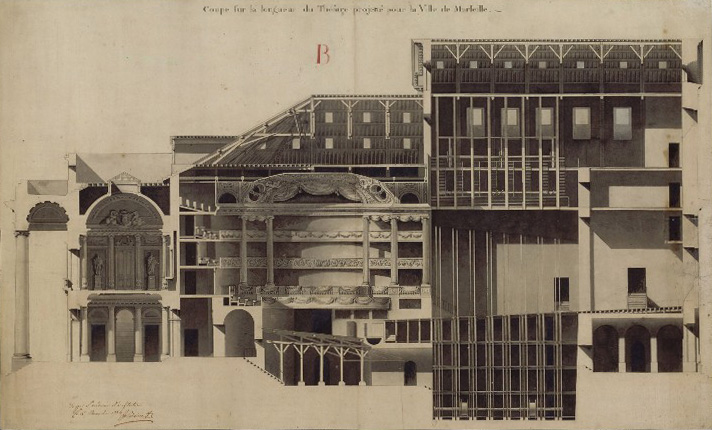
Cross-section, drawing by the architect Charles Joachim Bénard, 1784

The Opéra de Marseille (Occitan: Opèra de Marselha or Operà), known today as the Opéra Municipal (Opèra Municipal or Operà), is an opera company located in Marseille, France. In 1685, the city was the second in France after Bordeaux to have an opera house, which was erected on a tennis court.

However, the first real theatre, the Grand-Théâtre or Salle Bauveau was constructed in 1787. During its period of great opulence following the Revolution, it was the site of many major opera presentations, including Verdi's Rigoletto and Il Trovatore in 1860 and performances in 1866 of Lucia di Lammermoor and Il Barbiere di Siviglia by the famous soprano, Adelina Patti. Also, French premieres of major operatic works were given in the theatre: these include Aida (1877), La Fanciulla del West (1912), and an historic performance by Dame Nellie Melba in Ambroise Thomas' Hamlet in 1890. Some years following the installation of electricity, in November 1919 a fire destroyed the 18th century theatre, leaving only its shell and an exterior stone colonnade.

The present day opera house, the Opéra Municipal de Marseille, dates from its opening on 4 December 1924. It seats 1,800. It features a classic urn-shaped auditorium, three rings of boxes, two balconies and a gallery. A large, sculpted frieze by sculptor Antoine Bourdelle frames the stage.

Designed by the three architects Ebrard, Castel, and Raymond, the theatre preserved the stone colonnade and located the surviving original box office in the centre of the entrance hall, up from which led two staircases to the elegant main foyer. Beauvert describes it as "an Art Deco temple", the "soul mate" of the Théâtre des Champs-Elysées in Paris.

Many well-known contemporary singers made their French debuts in this opera house. Among them are Alfredo Kraus, Plácido Domingo, and Renata Scotto. The house has a reputation for its very critical audience, especially those members seated in the top gallery, "the gods". Past music directors of the company have included János Fürst.

After World War II the Marseille opera house staged Sigurd by Ernest Reyer in 1963, 1995 and 2025.
