= Le roi malgré lui =

Opéra-comique in three acts by Emmanuel Chabrier

- Opéra comique by Emmanuel Chabrier
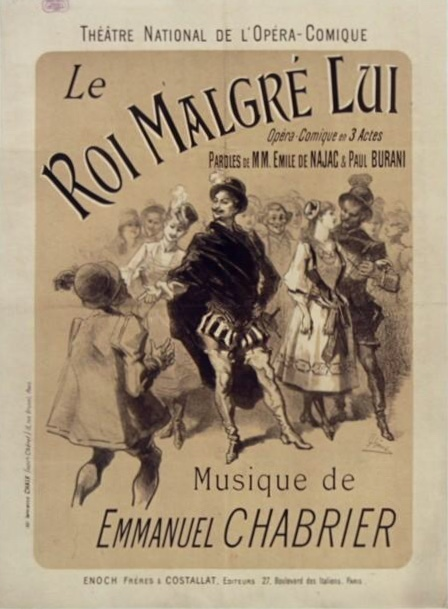
- Poster for the premiere by Jules Chéret
- Translation: King in Spite of Himself
- Librettist: Emile de Najac; Paul Burani
- Language: French
- Premiere: 8 May 1887; Opéra-Comique, Paris

Le roi malgré lui (The King in Spite of Himself or The Reluctant King) is an opéra-comique in three acts by Emmanuel Chabrier of 1887 with an original libretto by Emile de Najac and Paul Burani. The opera is revived occasionally, but has not yet found a place in repertory.

Eric Blom wrote that the tragic fate of the opera was to be written a quarter of a century too soon. However, the music has been greatly admired by composers including d'Indy, Ravel and Stravinsky.

== Composition history ==
Around May 1883 Chabrier wrote to his publishers that for his next stage work he was hoping to create something like Offenbach's successful 'grand fantaisie' Le roi Carotte. According to Victorin de Joncières, Chabrier had confided to him that he was looking for an amusing book to set. Joncières had been sent Le roi malgré lui, an old vaudeville of 1836 written by Marguerite-Louise Virginie Ancelot (1792–1875), by Ancelot's daughter Mme Lachaud. However, Joncières passed the play to Chabrier, and also introduced Chabrier to Léon Carvalho, to whom Chabrier played some 'audition' pieces, which convinced the Opéra-Comique director to stage his work.

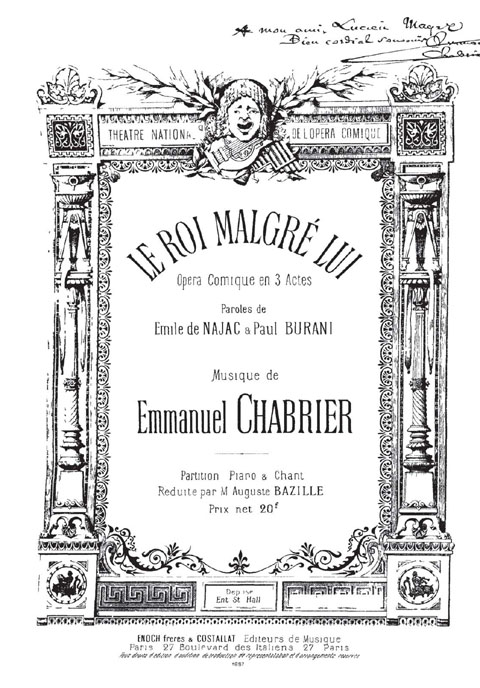
The title page of the vocal score of Le roi malgré lui

An article by Theodore Massiac described in some detail Chabrier's composition process for Le roi malgré lui. He carefully supervised the work of the librettists Paul Burani and Emile de Najac in adapting the Ancelot work. Burani would send drafts of scenes and songs to de Najac who would send back comments and changes to Burani, and when, after some exchanges of correspondence de Najac was happy, he would send words to Chabrier to set to music. At his home at La Membrolle, Chabrier would read the words out loud in order to find the tone and rhythm of each piece and only after having played around with the text for some time would take up his pen and start composing. Chabrier did not compose at the piano – melody and rhythm came first with harmony later. He was particularly critical of being supplied with mute syllables. Finally, Jean Richepin, an old friend of the composer, had a major part in helping provide Chabrier with a libretto he could feel happy with. Chabrier noted on his copy of the libretto "manuscript by three authors and even by me", going on to describe the libretto as "a bouillabaisse of Najac and Burani, cooked by Richepin, into which I throw the spices". Although much criticized, the stage situations of Najac and Burani are "dexterously handled and reveal a sense of variety and climax".

The work is dedicated to Madame Victorin de Joncières. It was one of several works by Chabrier to benefit from a poster by Jules Chéret.

== Performance history ==
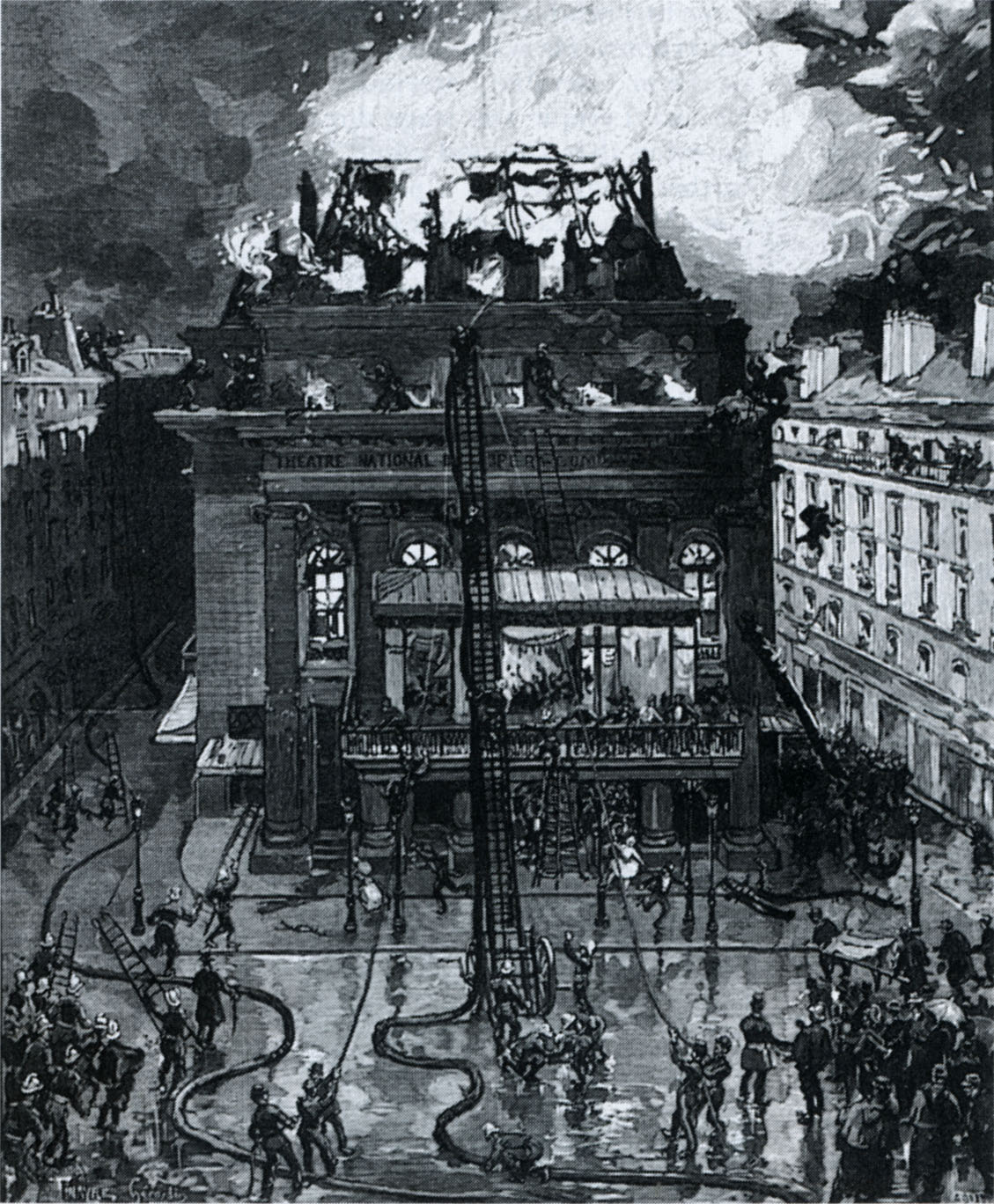
Fire at the second Salle Favart on 25 May 1887 (engraving).

The premiere was on 18 May 1887 at the Opéra-Comique (Salle Favart) in Paris. After two more performances, on 21 and 23 May, the Opéra-Comique theatre was ravaged by fire on 25 May, although the full score and orchestral parts were saved. The fourth performance was on 16 November in a revised version at the Salle des Nations, where it had further performances up to 29 April 1888. This was the second time a premiere run of one of Chabrier's operas had been disrupted - Gwendoline had closed when the theatre went bankrupt.

The German premiere was in Karlsruhe on 2 March 1890 under Felix Mottl who also led a performance on 5 March at Baden, and this was followed by productions in Dresden on 26 April 1890 under Ernst von Schuch, and in Cologne on 15 October 1891 under Julius Hofmann. The opera was produced on 9 March 1892 in Toulouse under Armand Raynaud.

In 1929 after a 41-year absence from the Opéra-Comique repertoire, Albert Carré revised the text, and a new version was performed there on 6 November to greater acclaim (the 50th performance at the theatre took place on 21 February 1937). Casts included Roger Bourdin as Henri de Valois, Yvonne Brothier as Minka and Vina Bovy as Alexina. There followed productions in Hamburg (17 April 1931), Brussels (16 May 1931) and Prague (27 August 1931). The first performance in Marseille took place during the war on 3 April 1942. André Cluytens conducted a local premiere for Lyon on 25 February 1943, also conducting the work at the Opéra-Comique in 1947 with Roger Bourdin, Louis Musy and Jean Vieuille in the cast and in 1950 with Denise Duval joining the cast. A 1978 production at the Capitole de Toulouse conducted by Plasson using the Carré edition was subsequently broadcast on French television in 1979, with Michel Philippe, Georges Liccioni, Michel Trempont, Françoise Garner and Michèle Le Bris in the principal roles.

The American stage premiere was on 18 November 1976 at the Juilliard, conducted by Manuel Rosenthal, with choreography by George Balanchine. The British stage premiere had to wait until the centenary of the composer's death, when it was produced in an adaptation by Jeremy Sams and Michael Wilcox at Opera North and also seen at the Edinburgh Festival.

More recently, an Opéra de Lyon production of 2004 was adapted for a revival at the Opéra-Comique in April 2009. Leon Botstein led the American Symphony Orchestra in a concert version at Avery Fisher Hall in 2005, and in a fully staged production directed by Thaddeus Strassberger at Bard Summerscape in 2012, a co-production seen later that year at the Wexford Festival Opera.

== Roles ==
Role	Voice type	Premiere Cast, 18 May 1887 (Conductor: Jules Danbé)	Revised Paris premiere, 6 November 1929 (Conductor: Louis Masson)
Henri de Valois, ‘'King of Poland'’	baritone	Max Bouvet	Roger Bourdin
Comte de Nangis, a friend of Henri	tenor	Louis Delaquerrière	Marcel Claudel
Minka, slave girl of Laski	soprano	Adèle Isaac	Yvonne Brothier
Alexina, Duchess of Fritelli and niece of Laski	soprano	Cécile Mézeray	Jeanne Guyla
Laski, a Polish noble, Minka's master	bass	Joseph Thiérry	Jean Vieuille
Duc de Fritelli, an Italian noble, husband of Alexina, chamberlain to the King	baritone	Lucien Fugère	Louis Musy
Basile, innkeeper	tenor	Barnolt	Paul Payen
Liancourt, a French noble	tenor	Victor Caisso	Mathyl
d'Elboeuf, a French noble	tenor	Michaud	Alban Derroja
Maugiron, a French noble	baritone	Collin	Émile Roque
Comte de Caylus, a French noble	baritone	Étienne Troy	Roland Laignez
Marquis de Villequier, a French noble	bass	Charles Balanqué	André Balbon
A soldier	bass	Cambot	Raymond Gilles
Six servant girls	soprano, mezzo	Mary, Auguez de Montaland, Blanche Balanqué, Esposito, Baria, Orea Nardi	Jany Delille, Quénet,
Pages, French nobles, Polish nobles, Soldiers, Serfs and Servants, People

== Synopsis ==
=== Act 1 ===
A castle outside Kraków, in 1574

The Polish people have elected a French noble, Henri de Valois, to become their king. In a castle near Kraków he awaits incognito his coronation.

French nobles are idly waiting for news from Kraków. Nangis, a friend of Henri, returns from the city, where he had been sent to drum up support for the future king. Although the ordinary people had been well-disposed towards Henri, the nobility, led by Count Albert Laski, seemed to be joining together to oppose him and support the other claimant to the throne, the Archduke of Austria.

However, the Duke of Fritelli, a Venetian living in Poland, has managed to become Henri's chamberlain while remaining in league with Laski. He enters, busy with preparations for the coronation, pretending to Nangis that he does not know Laski, and, on learning of the king's continued homesickness, cannot resist airing his views on the differences between the Poles and the French in a comic song.

After Fritelli has gone, Nangis confesses to his friends that during the eight days he has been away trying to raise an army, he has fallen in love with a charming girl, Minka, who unfortunately is a slave in Laski's household. Minka now enters, avoiding a pursuing sentry; she tells Nangis that she has only come for a moment, but when Nangis takes this to mean that she does not love him anymore, she gently rebukes him and asks him to be patient. She promises to return later that day, but as she is about to leave, the king himself arrives and Nangis only has time to hide her in an anteroom.

The homesick king sings of his love for France and says that he would do anything not to be king of Poland. Nangis reminds him that he has not always been so ill-disposed to the Poles; there was a certain lady Henri had known in Venice... Henri's fond memories are interrupted by the return of Fritelli, and it soon becomes apparent that the lady with whom Henri had a liaison in Venice soon after became the wife of Fritelli in order to cover up the scandal of that affair.

When Henri and Nangis leave, Fritelli is naturally more determined than ever to rid Poland of Henri. His frenzy is cut short by the arrival of his wife, Alexina, who says that all is ready for Henri's departure: all Fritelli has to do is kidnap Henri and Laski's men will do the rest. When the frightened Fritelli says he does not want glory - just a bit of affection, Alexina brushes his objections aside and they leave.

Minka comes out of hiding, but she bumps into the king (whom she doesn't know). She says she loves Monsieur Nangis but is worried that there is a plot against the king. Henri can hardly contain his delight, which increases more when she says that Fritelli is implicated. When Minka has left, Henri sends for Fritelli, and after some initial resistance he confesses the plot to Henri and tells him all he wants to know. Fritelli is astonished when Henri says that he too wishes to join the conspiracy; Fritelli is to introduce him to Laski as the Count de Nangis.

Trumpets sound and the French courtiers assemble. Henri has Nangis arrested, so as to be able to use his identity to conspire against the king. Nangis is led away.

Fritelli presents Henri (as Nangis) to his wife, Alexina, who recognizes him as the Frenchman with whom she had had the affair in Venice years before. Minka's lone voice is heard off-stage, and as the curtain falls, Nangis manages to let slip his captors, jump out of a window and escape.

=== Act 2 ===
The ballroom of the palace of the Count Albert Laski

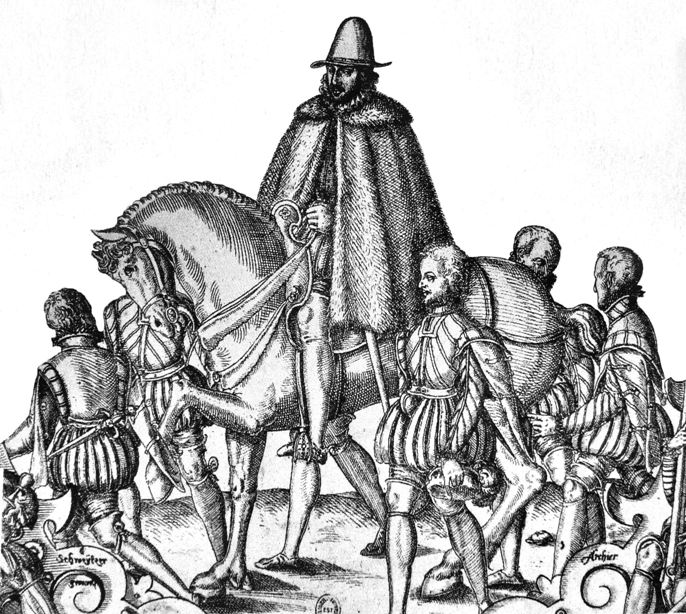
Henri de Valois in Polish dress

That evening, a ball is being held at Laski's house, under the cover of which Laski and his co-conspirators wish to complete the details for Henri's departure. When the dancing is over, the Duke and Duchess of Fritelli arrive and introduce a new conspirator as the Count de Nangis (in reality the king in disguise). Henri (as Nangis) tells them he is no longer Henri's friend but his greatest enemy.

Alone with Fritelli, Henri is astonished to discover for the first time that Alexina is married to Fritelli, but before he gets any further, Minka and other slave girls enter singing, during which the voice of the real Nangis (who should be under lock and key) is heard outside. Minka believes that Henri has become a traitor to the king but does not yet know his true identity. When she tries to leave to warn the real Nangis, Henri orders Fritelli to lock her up in an anteroom.

Alexina returns and Henri, to be alone with her, hurriedly sends her husband away. Alexina is still furious that Henri left her in Venice without a farewell, but during the ensuing duet, he gradually wins her round, and their feelings are rekindled. They are interrupted first by Fritelli, then by Laski and the Poles, who have come to swear in Henri as a conspirator. Henri assures Laski that there will be no problem in getting hold of the king - he will be here soon; all Henri needs is a few moments to arrange this.

Alone, Henri summons Minka and tells her that Nangis must come at once. Minka calls him - and he shortly climbs in through a window and is immediately arrested. Everyone, including Minka, is convinced he is the king, and they behave accordingly. Nangis himself is mystified until - in asides - Henri commands him to play the part, which he does with relish. Henri tells Nangis that they are resolved that the king leave Poland forthwith. Laski then orders Nangis and Minka to leave. To the horror of the conspirators, he tells them that the only way to ensure that the king does not return is to kill him that very night. They draw lots and Henri is chosen to do the deed, but at that moment Minka re-enters, and boldly announces that she has set Nangis (they think: the King) free, and the act closes with the fury of the Polish nobles and with Henri once again swearing that he will get rid of the king.

=== Act 3 ===
An inn between Krakow and the Polish frontier

The innkeeper, Basile, and his staff are preparing to receive the new king of Poland. Fritelli arrives and informs them that the new king will not be Henri but the Archduke of Austria. Basile says it's all the same to him. Their cries of 'long live the archduke' are echoed by a stranger who has entered: Henri, making his escape from Poland. Fritelli, who recognizes him, is mystified by Henri's enthusiasm for the archduke.

Henri, introducing himself to Basile as Nangis, sent in advance of the king, is stunned when he hears that he won't be able to complete his escape, as all the coaches were sent off to meet the Archduke, so he has to settle for a cart and an old nag, with a servant girl to show him the way.

Henri hears a coach approach outside and hides. It is Alexina, who has arrived looking for her husband. She tells him that she has changed sides and sent the Archduke back to Austria by telling him that the conspiracy has been discovered. Fritelli is not happy and accuses her of changing sides so as to continue her Venetian affair in Poland. A marital squabble ensues, after which Fritelli tells Alexina that her beloved 'Nangis' is disfigured after his murder of the king and leaves.

Minka arrives; Alexina is not able to tell her about the king's fate, and they join in a duet in which they worry about the fate of the men they love. Alexina finally tells her that the king is murdered and Minka, believing that this means her beloved Nangis is dead, collapses. Basile arrives to say that the servant girl he had promised 'Nangis' to guide his way has gone to the Basilica to watch the coronation and Alexina determines to take her place.

Convinced that Nangis has been killed, Minka sings a lament for her lover – only for him to enter at its climax. After convincing her that he is not an apparition, the two join in an ecstatic duet. Minka tells Nangis that Alexina thinks the king has been killed. Nangis – believing that she means the real king – drags her off to find him.

Alexina enters dressed as a servant girl and meets Henri; Fritelli hurries them on their way, content to be rid of his rival, but his pleasure is short-lived as he learns that the servant-girl was his wife, and he rushes off in pursuit of them both. Minka is mystified by all this until Nangis finally tells her who the real king is. Henri is shortly brought back in, reconciled to becoming king and receiving the acclamation of the pages, lords and soldiers assembled.

== History and fiction ==
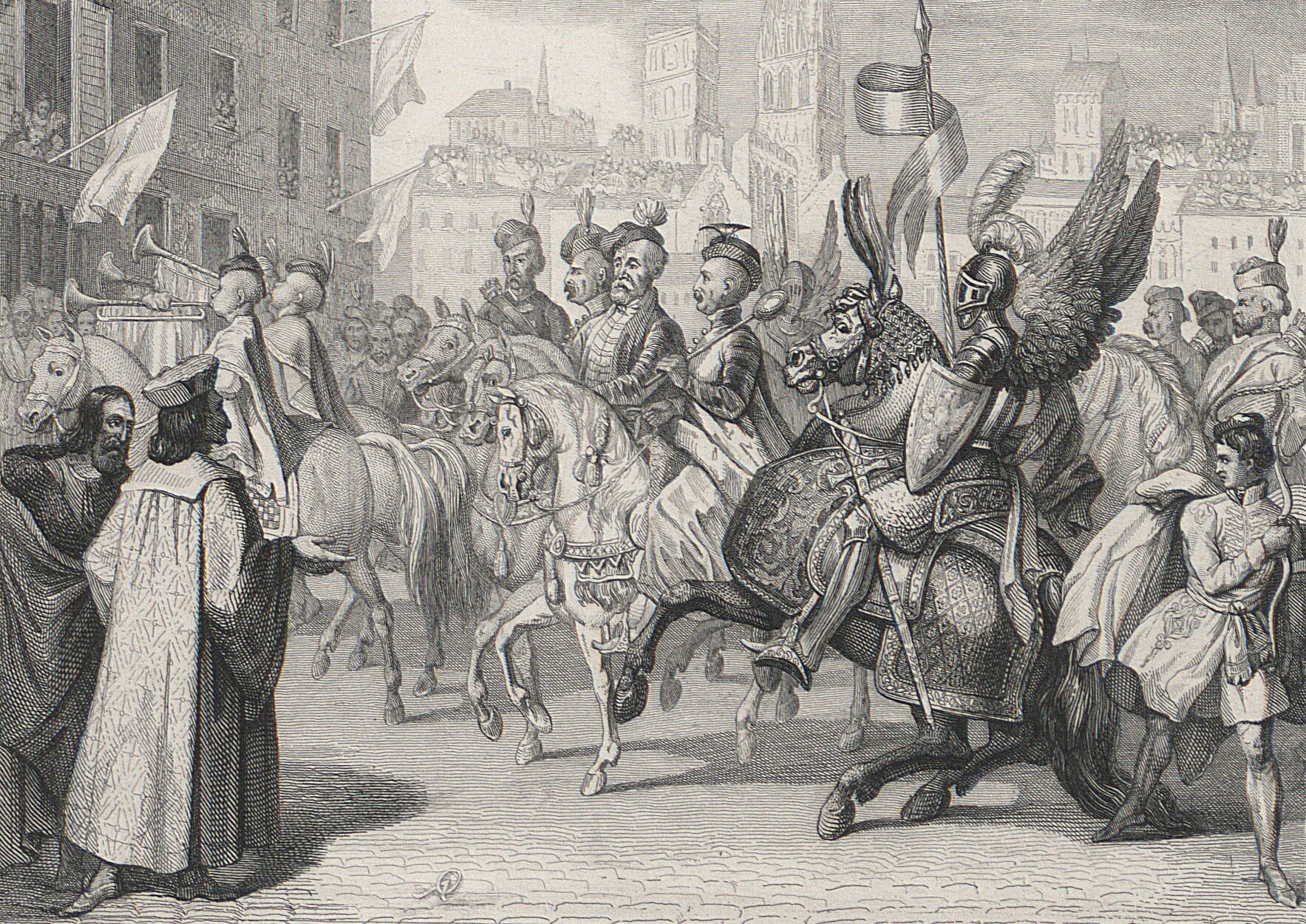
Departure of Polish envoys for Henry Valois

Henri de Valois (1551–1589) was the third son of Henri II and Catherine de Medicis. In 1573, following the death of Sigismund II, Henri was elected King of the Polish–Lithuanian Commonwealth. Five months after his coronation as King of Poland at Wawel Castle in Kraków, upon the death of his brother Charles IX (who died without leaving an heir), Henri secretly left Poland and returned to France, where he was crowned King on 13 February 1575, at Rheims Cathedral. He never returned to Poland, and was assassinated in 1589.

Albert Łaski was a Polish courtier at the time of his brief reign. Nangis is a small town around 60 km south-west of Paris.

In La Reine Margot, chapter LXV: Les Ambassadeurs, Alexandre Dumas, père conjures up the coronation of Henri in Kraków, and his unhappiness at being king.

Musically Chabrier entirely ignores the sixteenth century environment of the plot.

== The music ==
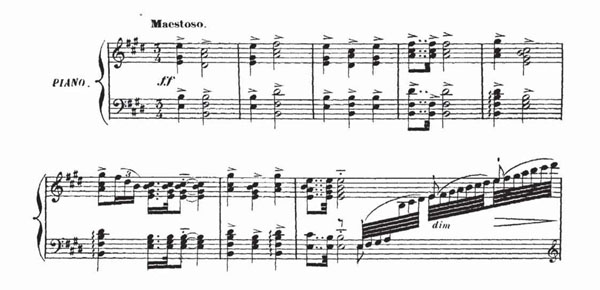
The opening bars Le roi malgré lui, which according to Ravel "changed the course of French harmony"

The music has been greatly admired by musicians such as Ravel (who claimed he could play the whole piece from memory) and Stravinsky. Ravel claimed that "the premiere of Le roi malgré lui changed the course of French harmony". Harmonic progressions are used which were completely new in French music at the time – most notably the use of unprepared and unresolved chords of the seventh and ninth, such as the very first chords of the Prelude. The 1911 Encyclopædia Britannica declared it "one of the finest opéras comiques of modern times". Blom stated "we discover in it the germs of much that we have come to look upon as belonging essentially to French music of the [20th] century".

Grove comments, "the brilliance of Chabrier’s music, often reminiscent of Berlioz and sometimes of Bizet, rests on a superbly crafted structure. The balance between romantic and comic episodes, a striking feature of all Chabrier's opera, is at its most perfect in Le roi malgré lui."

Chabrier's music shows the evidence of the two paths of the composition, of both libretto and music – from opérette to opéra-comique. The original plan, around 1884, a light work in the style of L'étoile was reinvigorated by Carvalho in 1886, into something grander and more dramatic with greater love interest.

Broadly comic passages typical of operetta remain – especially the couplets for Fritelli – but the work by Richepin on both dialogue and lyrics improved the literary tone of the work. However the mutation from opérette to opéra-comique gave Chabrier the chance to provide music of a serious harmonic intent, such as Minka and Alexina's nocturne in Act 3 (described by Huebner as "one of the most beautiful numbers in fin-de-siècle French opera"), which flows lyrically over a large harmonic canvas. Likewise, in Act 1 Henri introduces himself through an air with has the character of a pavane.

"Danse slave"
Performed by the United States Air Force Band

Early changes to the score after the first performance included removing Alexina's demanding air "Pour vous je suis ambitieuse" in Act 1 and re-casting a rondeau for Henri and Alexina in Act 3 as a duet for Fritelli and Alexina in Act 1.

Musically the most diverse role is that of Minka; from the romance-like shape of her Act 1 entrance solo "Hélas, à l'esclavage" by way of the roulades, chromaticism and wide leaps of her 'Chanson tzigane' in Act 2, to the powerful operatic duet in Act 3 with Nangis. On the lighter side, musical parody occurs several times. The 'Ensemble de la conjuration' was compared by contemporary critics to the 'Bénédiction des poignards' in Les Huguenots, while Fritelli's Act 3 couplets end each verse with a quote from the Hungarian March from La Damnation de Faust.

Huebner concludes his exploration of Le roi malgré lui by proposing that the collision of the traditions of opérette and opéra-comique results in "an explosion of pastiche, quotation, allusion, archaisms, dance rhythms of all kinds, Wagnerian chromaticisms, modernist parallel chords, patter singing", and for musical pleasure brackets Le roi malgré lui with Verdi's Falstaff. Paulson offers a comprehensive analysis of the music of the opera, arguing that these characteristics, among others, contribute to a sophisticated discourse of musical humour that operates on multiple structural and intertextual levels.

The opera was not to the taste of Cosima Wagner, who attended an 1890 performance in Dresden. She wrote to Felix Mottl: "What vulgarity and lack of ideas. No performance in the world could conceal for an instant these trivialities."

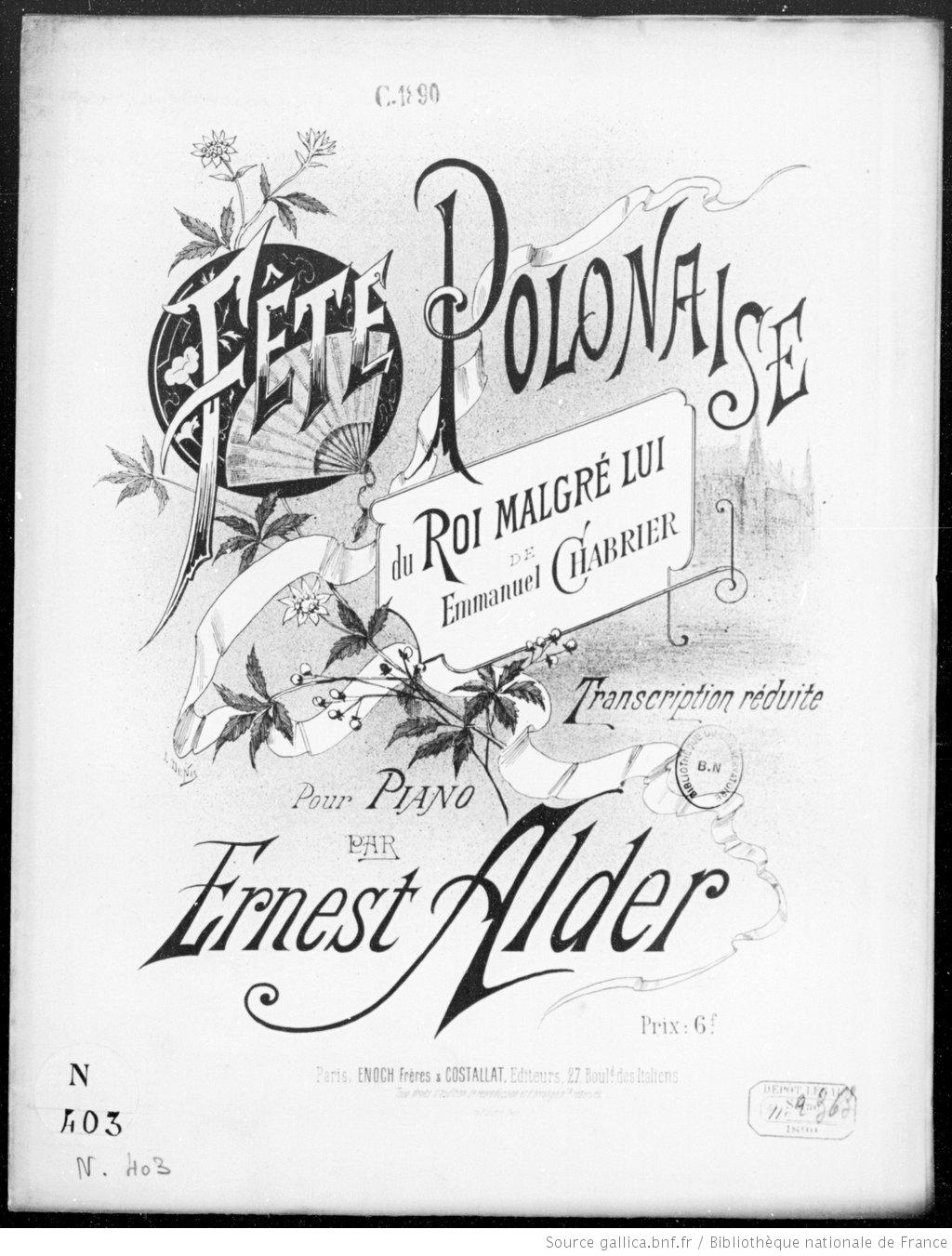
Cover of transcription of the Fête polonaise

Two orchestral extracts from the opera have from time to time found their way onto concert programmes and recordings : the Fête polonaise and the Danse slave.

=== Orchestration ===
2 flutes (2 piccolos), 2 oboes, 2 clarinets, 2 bassoons, 4 horns, 3 cornets à piston, 3 trombones, timpani, percussion (bass drum, cymbals, triangle, side drum), 2 harps and strings.

Chabrier confided to Lecocq that the score of Le Roi was much better orchestrated than Gwendoline (although this did not prevent Ravel proposing to Chabrier's sister-in-law, at the time of the 1929 revival, that he re-orchestrate the Fête polonaise).

== Recordings ==
- Erato, 1984: Gino Quilico (Henri de Valois), Peter Jeffes (Comte de Nangis), Barbara Hendricks (Minka), Isabel Garcisanz (Alexina), Jean-Philippe Lafont (Fritelli), Chris de Moor (Laski); Choeur de Radio France, Nouvel Orchestre Philharmonique de Radio France conducted by Charles Dutoit, réf. 2292-45792-2.

Radio broadcasts of the opera have included:

- French radio, 1969. Bernard Demigny (Henri de Valois), Bernard Plantey (Comte de Nangis), Odile Pieti (Minka), Jacqueline Brumaire (Alexina), Aimé Doniat (Fritelli), Jacques Mars (Laski); Chœur et Orchestre lyrique de la RTF, Pierre-Michel Le Conte
- BBC broadcast, 1973. Henri Gui (Henri de Valois), André Mallabrera (Comte de Nangis), Odile Pieti (Minka), Christiane Stutzman (Alexina), Michel Trempont (Fritelli), Neil Howlett (Laski); BBC Northern Singers, BBC Northern Symphony Orchestra, conducted by Manuel Rosenthal.
