= Madame Bovary (disambiguation) =

Madame Bovary is novel by Gustave Flaubert, published in 1856.

Madame Bovary may also refer to:

== Films ==
- Madame Bovary (1934 film), directed by Jean Renoir
- Madame Bovary (1937 film), directed by Gerhard Lamprecht
- Madame Bovary (1947 film), directed by Carlos Schlieper
- Madame Bovary (1949 film), directed by Vincente Minnelli
- Madame Bovary (1969 film), directed by Hans Schott-Schöbinger
- Madame Bovary (1991 film), directed by Claude Chabrol
- Madame Bovary (2014 film), directed by Sophie Barthes

== Other ==
- Madame Bovary (opera), 1951 opera by Emmanuel Bondeville
- Madame Bovary (1975 TV series), produced by the BBC and starring Francesca Annis as Emma
- Madame Bovary (2000 TV series), a 2000 serial directed by Tim Fywell
