= Lucienne Jourfier =

French singer

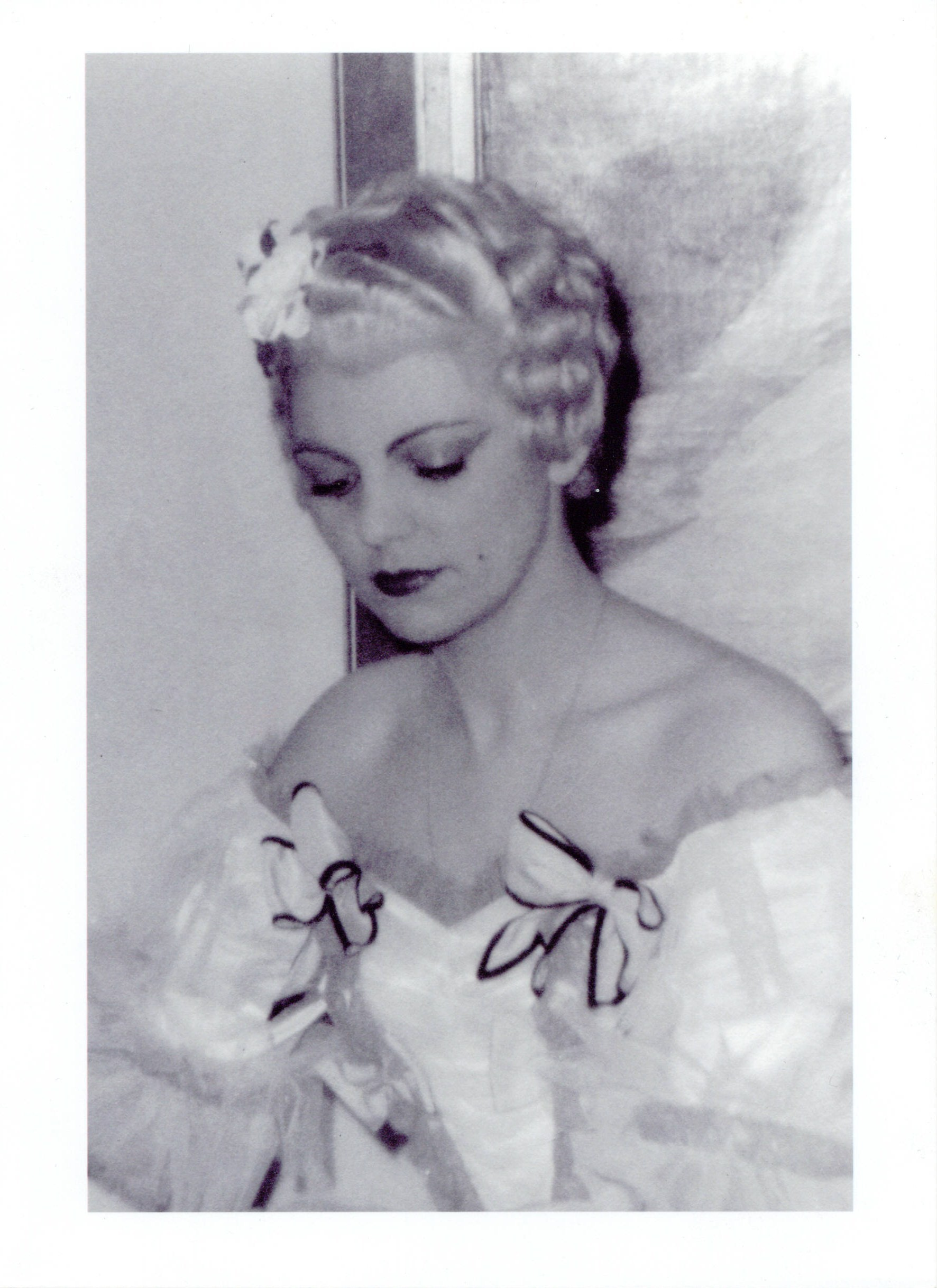
Lucienne Jourfier as Manon

Lucienne Jourfier (17 September 1923 in Toulouse - 10 January 2017 in Paris) was a 20th-century French operatic coloratura soprano.

== Biography ==
Her father, Gaston Jourfier, a renowned painter and professor at the city's Fine Arts School, was already creating sets for the Théâtre du Capitole de Toulouse. Her aunt, Germaine Bailac of the Paris Opera, was in her day a celebrated singer in Paris: she had begun at the Opera in 1907 in the role of Delilah, and was later a much sought-after Carmen.

Jourfier approached music by entering the conservatory of her hometown in the viola class. It was at the age of 19, when she was working as an accompanist in the singing class, that she made a name for herself and joined the same singing class at the Toulouse Conservatory. She obtained her first prizes unanimously from the jury in June 1943, already being noticed by the directors of the lyrical theatres present, including that of the Capitol, who offered to hire her in his troupe.

She nevertheless insisted on obtaining her prizes in Paris, and entered the Conservatoire de la Ville de Paris a few months later in March 1945, in the class of Paul Guillamat, the father of singer Ginette Guillamat. She won her first prizes, again unanimously, in June 1945, just six months after she had entered the singing class at the Conservatoire de Paris. She sang the same aria as during the entrance contest, the "Scene of Madness" of Lucia di Lammermoor, with variations of Lily Pons. It is on the occasion of the contest for the students of this singing class that the composer and conductor Reynaldo Hahn noticed this 21-year-old girl, and hired her to begin on the prestigious stage of the Palais Garnier the following August during the revival of Mozart's The Magic Flute, in which she had Mado Robin, Paul Cabanel and Henri Médus as partners. Thus Jourfier made her debut at the Paris Opera on 10 August 1945 in the role of Pamina, aged 21. She remains to this day the youngest singer of the Paris opera.

Also in 1945, Jourfier made her debut at the Salle Favart in the role of Sophie in Werther. Subsequently, she sang Leila of Les Pêcheurs de perles, Philine of Mignon, Violetta of La Traviata, Micaela of Carmen, Suzanne of The Marriage of Figaro, La Guimard of Gabriel Pierné's Fragonard (with Fanély Revoil and Jacques Jansen), Mimi of La Bohème, Messager's Monsieur Beaucaire which she sang with Jacques Jansen, Rosina of The Barber of Seville... She was chosen to play this Rosina on screen when it was decided to produce a film production of Rossini's opera in 1948 under the musical direction of conductor André Cluytens. Jourfier responded there to Raymond Amade, Roger Bourdin and Roger Bussonnet.

At the palais Garnier, besides Pamina, she was Gounod's Juliette (1947), and it was to her that Maurice Lehmann entrusted the task of resurrecting "Amour" of Rameau's Les Indes galantes in the 1952 revival with Géori Boué, Denise Duval, Janine Micheau and Jacqueline Brumaire.

She also played in Massenet's Manon, which was the role in which she left a great memory.

The young woman announced that she was leaving the Paris Opera in 1953. Maurice Lehmann continued to consider her a full member of his troupe. But nothing did: Lucienne Jourfier continued to perform live, less and less often, and gave up her career definitively in 1956, at the age of 32.

Being bound by an exclusive contract with the Paris Opera, Jourfier could only exceptionally participate in recording sessions. She nevertheless leaves a handful of discs, among which are the main arias of Massenet's Manon. For the same reasons, her career in the provinces and abroad was rather limited, the artists under contract with the Opera at the time having the possibility to perform on other stages only during their holidays (i.e. in July in early August). Jourfier was nevertheless able to meet audiences in North Africa and Geneva; but it was in Monte-Carlo that she represented the Paris Opera and the French singing school, particularly during the 1952 season. Raoul Gunsbourg, then director of the Monte-Carlo Opera asked her to come and sing in 'his' "house of the Bohemians", a performance which moved both the public, and the princely family, and her partner, the great tenor Giacomo Lauri-Volpi.

There are a very large number of radio recordings of this singer in the Institut national de l'audiovisuel archives.

Lucienne Jourfier died in Paris at age 92.
