= Frances Ingram =

American opera singer (1888–1974)

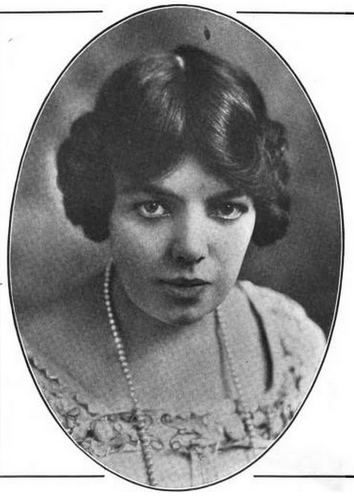
Frances Ingram, from an advertisement published in 1915

Elizabeth Frances Ingram (5 November 1888 – 12 April 1974) was an American operatic contralto of English birth who had an active career in North America during the 1910s and 1920s.

== Life and career ==
Born in Liverpool, Ingram was a graduate of Normal College in New York City. From 1910 to 1912 she was a singing pupil of Victor Maurel. She made her professional opera debut on 2 December 1911 with the Chicago Grand Opera Company at the Metropolitan Opera House in Philadelphia as Lola in Pietro Mascagni's Cavalleria rusticana. She remained with that company for two seasons, performing in both Chicago and Philadelphia in roles like Antonia in Jacques Offenbach's The Tales of Hoffmann, Gertrude in Engelbert Humperdinck's Hänsel und Gretel, Grimgerde in Richard Wagner's Die Walküre, Maddalena in Giuseppe Verdi's Rigoletto, and a Page in Wagner's Lohengrin.

In 1913 Ingram was committed to the Montreal Opera. That same year she married the theatrical manager Karl G. MacVitty in Toronto. She toured the United States in concert in 1914–1915. From 1915 until 1919 she sang with the Chicago Opera Association where she was heard as Amneris in Aida, Azucena in Il trovatore, Brangäne in Tristan und Isolde, La Cieca in La Gioconda, Orfeo in Orfeo ed Euridice, Suzuki in Madama Butterfly, and the title role in Carmen. She also performed in operas at Ravinia Park. In February 1919 she was a soloist in Felix Mendelssohn's Lobgesang with the Chicago Symphony Orchestra.

Ingram sang with the Metropolitan Opera in New York City from 1919 until 1921; making her debut as Suzuki to the Cio-Cio-San of Geraldine Farrar on 19 November 1919. Her other roles at the Met included a Flower Maiden in Parsifal, Mardion in Henry Kimball Hadley's Cleopatra's Night, Mercédès in Georges Bizet's Carmen, Olga in Eugene Onegin, the Solo Madrigalist in Giacomo Puccini's Manon Lescaut, the Young Ragpicker in Louise, and Night in the world premiere of Albert Wolff's L'oiseau bleu. Her last appearance at the Met was as Floriana in Ruggero Leoncavallo's Zazà on 2 April 1921. In 1927 she toured with the Bohumir Kryl Band.
