= Vieuille =

Vieuille is a surname. Notable people with the surname include:

- Félix Vieuille (1872–1953), French operatic bass
- Jean Vieuille (1902–1967), French bass-baritone singer
