= Mary Mellish (soprano) =

American operatic soprano

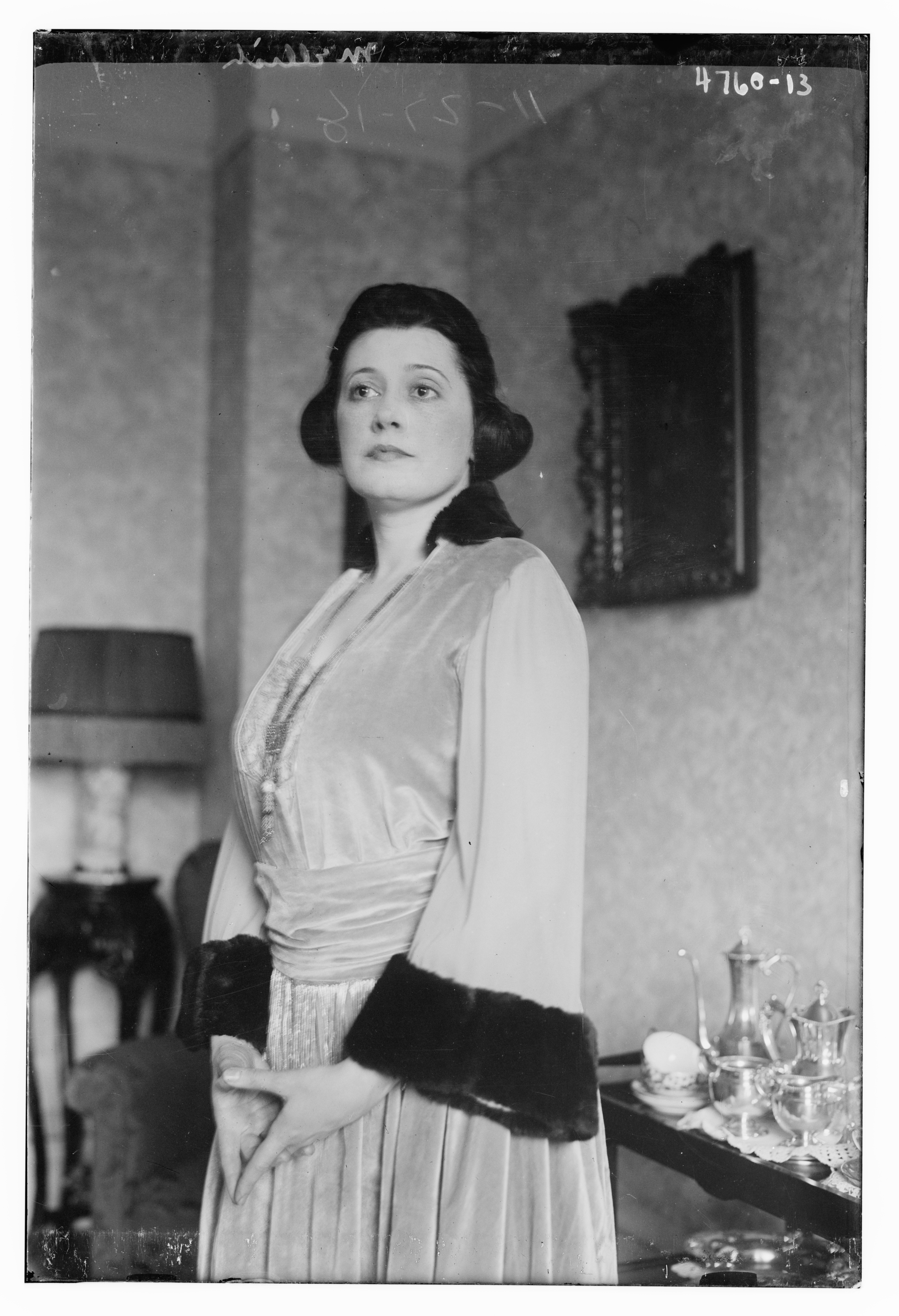
Mary Mellish

Mary Mellish (1890 – 30 January 1955, Albany) was an American operatic soprano and musical theatre actress. She sang six seasons with the Metropolitan Opera from 1918-1924. In 1925 she originated the role of Catherine the Great in Harry B. Smith's Broadway musical Natja

== Early life and career ==
Marry Mellish was born Mary Flannery in Albany, New York in 1890. She was educated at St. John's Academy in her native city. There she began her initial musical training as a pianist. She married Jay A Mellish in Manhattan on 28 April 1909. They remained married until her husband was killed in a fire in November 1927.

Mellish was trained as a vocalist at the Von Ende School of Music on 85th St in New York City where she was a pupil Adrienne Remenyi Von Ende (daughter of the violinist and composer Ede Reményi). She later studied singing in New York City with Estelle Liebling, and German lieder with composer and pianist Richard Epstein (1869-1919).

Mellish sang with the Oratorio Society of New York prior to her career as a soloist. She gave her first performance at Carnegie Hall in March 1919, performing Musetta's Waltz, "Quando me'n vo'", from La Bohème. In 1920 she gave a song recital at Aeolian Hall that included arias by George Frideric Handel, Jean-Baptiste Lully, and Wolfgang Amadeus Mozart. In 1922 she was the soprano soloist in a concert of opera arias with the City Symphony Orchestra at the Century Theatre.

== Metropolitan Opera ==
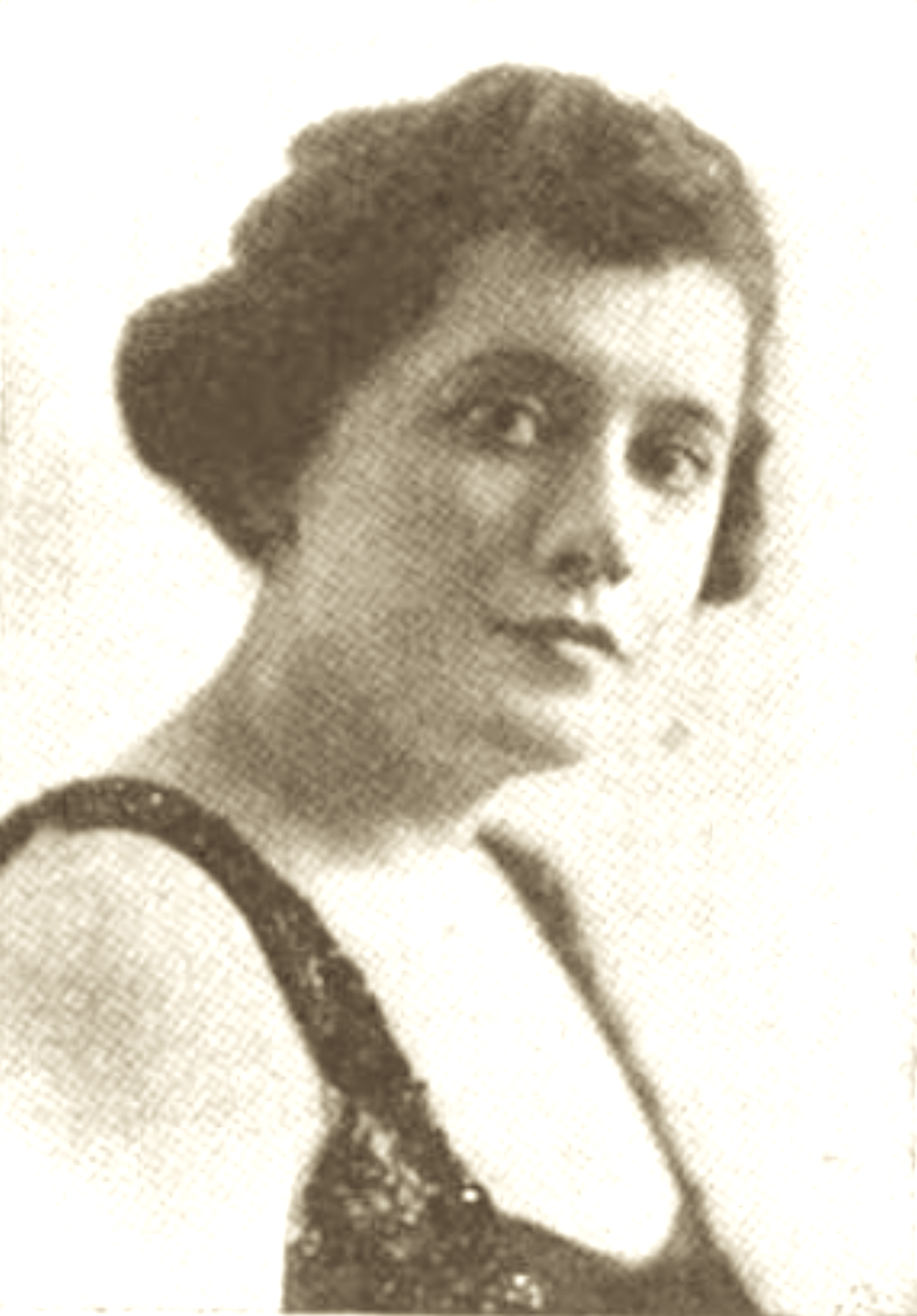
Mary Mellish

Mellish was committed to the Metropolitan Opera from 1918-1924 where she sang a total of 20 different roles across 107 performances at the Metropolitan Opera House on 39th st. She made her debut at the Met as Xenia in Modest Mussorgsky's Boris Godunov on 25 November 1918 with Adamo Didur in the title role and Gennaro Papi conducting. At the Met she sang the role of the Second Youth in the United States premiere of La reine Fiammette by Xavier Leroux, and created the role of Happiness in the world premiere of Albert Wolff's L'oiseau bleu on 27 December 1919.

While Mellish mainly specialized in comprimario parts, on occasion she sang larger roles such as the title part in The Golden Cockerel which she performed at the Met on March 29, 1924. Other roles she sang at the Met included Nella in Gianni Schicchi, a high school girl in Shanewis, the handmaiden in L'amore dei tre re, Frasquita in Carmen, Dolcina in Suor Angelica, a choirboy in Le Prophète, Countess Ceprano in Rigoletto, a flower maiden in Parsifal, Javotte in Manon, Marguerite in Louise, a page in Lohengrin, Helmwige in Die Walküre, and Musetta in La Bohème. Her final performance on the Met stage was at a gala concert on April 6, 1924 in which she performed Micaela's aria, "Je dis que rien ne m'épouvante", from Carmen.

== Later life and career ==
In 1925 Mellish originated the role of Catherine the Great in Harry B. Smith's Broadway musical Natja which ran at the Knickerbocker Theatre. In 1929 she was committed to the Philadelphia Grand Opera Company; performing Puccini's Musetta.

In 1941 Mellish's autobiography, A Singer's Life: Sometime I Reminisce, was published by G. P. Putnam's Sons. Her second husband, William Boyce Eakin, died in 1951.

Mellish died on 30 January 1955 in Albany, New York.
