= Cécile Mézeray =

French opera singer

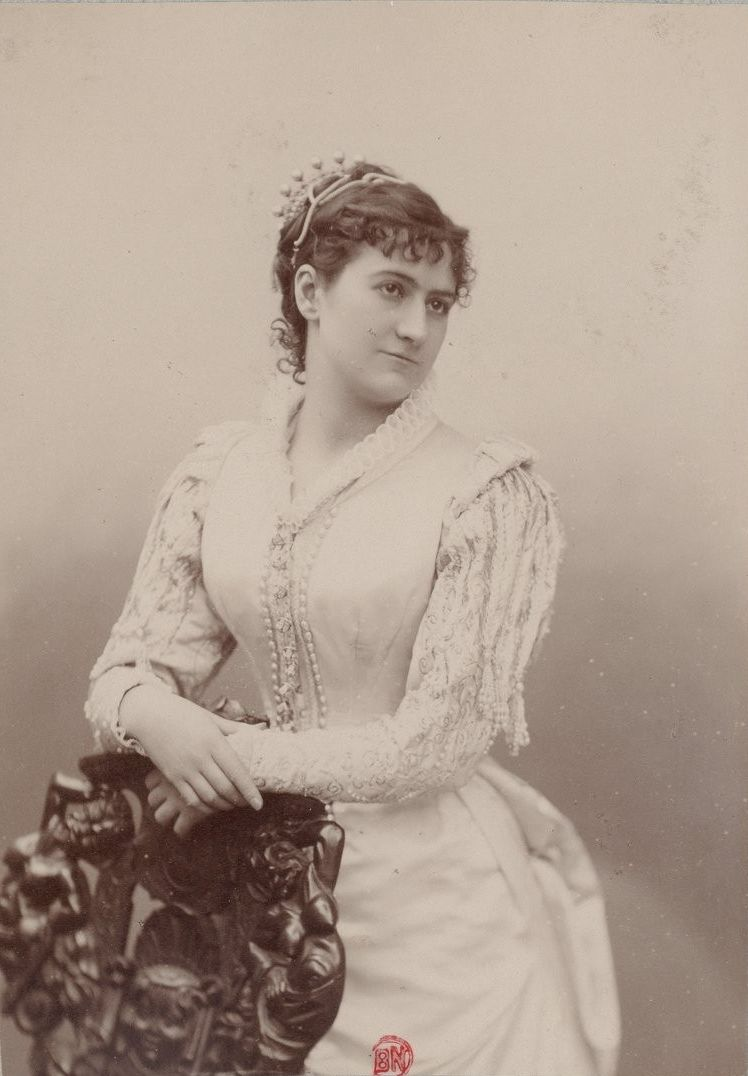
Cécile Mézéray by Nadar

Cécile Mézéray was a French soprano active in France and Belgium in the mid nineteenth century. Born around 1859, she was one of the daughters of the musician Charles Mézeray (né Costard, born in Brunswick in 1810 and sometime conductor of the Grand Théâtre de Bordeaux). Her sisters Caroline and Reine were also professional singers. As well as singing, Cécile also played the harp.

== Life and career ==
At the age of 18? Mézéray appeared with the Théâtre Lyrique at the Théâtre de la Gaîté in Paris as Rosine in the Barber of Seville in April 1877, and later that season as Violetta Tiepolo in Bravo by Salvayre.

Mézéray made her Paris Opéra-Comique debut on 27 May 1878 as Isabelle in Le Pré aux clercs, having spent the previous winter season in Lyon. A good actress and musician, her salary at that time was 3,000 francs per month. Later in 1878 she sang Marie in a revival of La Fille du régiment, and she continued to sing at the Opéra-Comique for ten years. In 1881 she sang Angèle in Le Domino noir, and the title role in Haydée in 1882.

She was billed at the Théâtre de la Monnaie in Jean de Nivelle during the 1882-83 season and appeared during the 1885-86 season as Catherine de Médicis in the premiere of Saint-Mégrin, when she was praised for her “impeccable talent”.

She sang Rosine in the 100th performance of Le Barbier de Séville at the Opéra-Comique on 25 February 1887, alongside Louis Delaquerrière as Almaviva and Gabriel Soulacroix as Figaro, and Philine in the 500th performance of Mignon in 1878. Other roles with the company included Cherubino in 1882, the Queen of the Night in 1883, and Camille in Zampa in 1883.

She created a role in Dianora by Samiel Rousseau (1879), and sang Laurette in a revival of Richard Cœur de Lion in December 1880.

In the preparation for Chabrier's Le roi malgré lui Mézeray came into dispute with Carvalho over the importance of her role. A replacement was found (Merguillier) but in April 1887 she had returned to rehearsals and created the part of Alexina that May.

Mézéray appeared as Catherine Glover in the first revival in Paris of Bizet's La jolie fille de Perth, on 3 November 1890 at the Éden-Théâtre.
