= Madame Bovary (opera) =

Opera by Emmanuel Bondeville

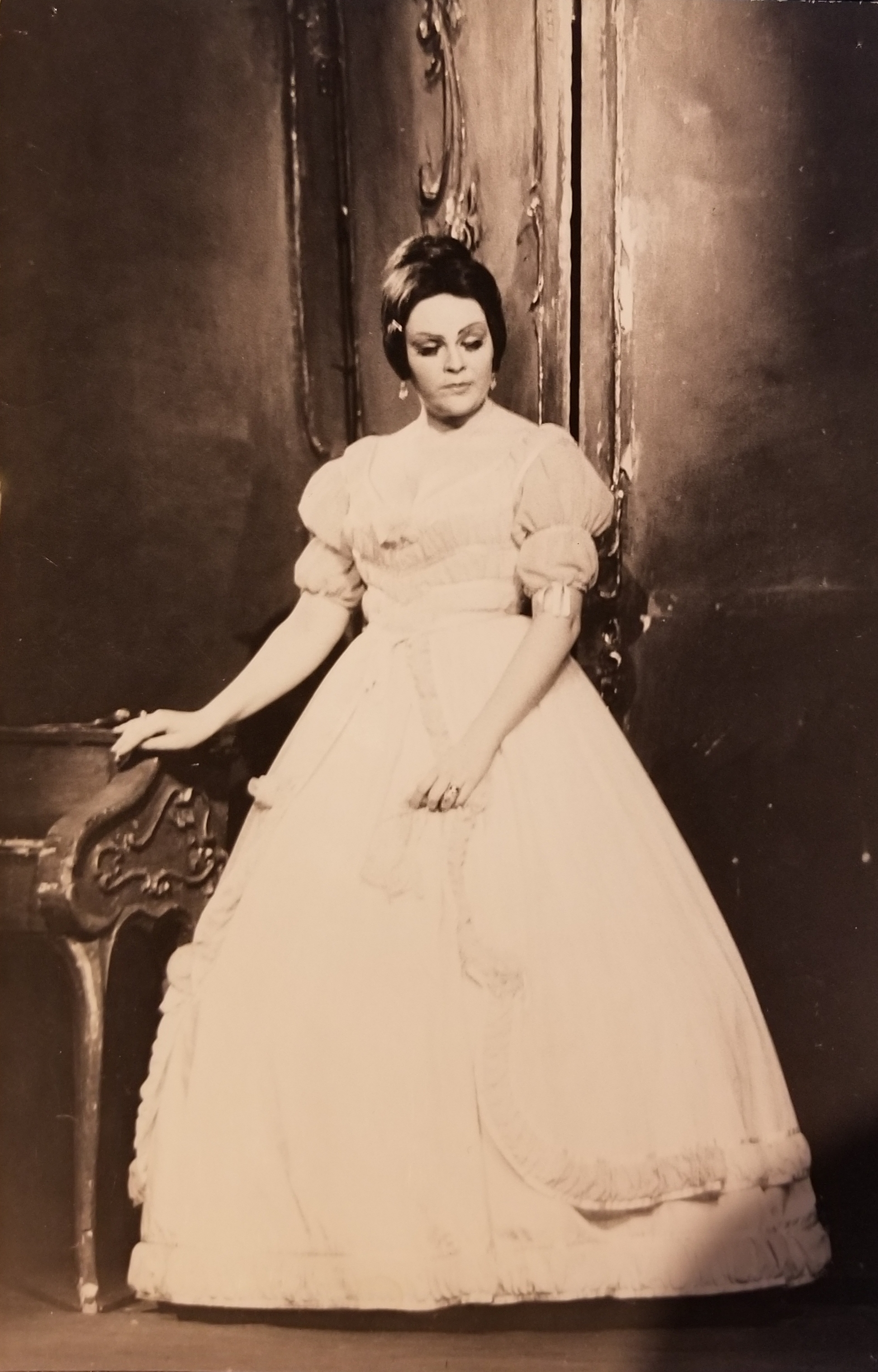
Lidiya Sizenyova in the title role

Madame Bovary is an opera by Emmanuel Bondeville premiered at the Opéra-Comique on 1 June 1951 in a production by Louis Musy, conducted by Albert Wolff, with Jacqueline Brumaire in the title role The opera is based upon the novel Madame Bovary by Gustave Flaubert.

== Recordings ==
- Andree Esposito, Julien Haas, Yves Bisson, Nadine Denize, Orchestre de la Radio Lyrique de Paris, Pierre-Michel Le Conte 1962
