= L'oiseau bleu (opera) =

1919 opera by Albert Wolff

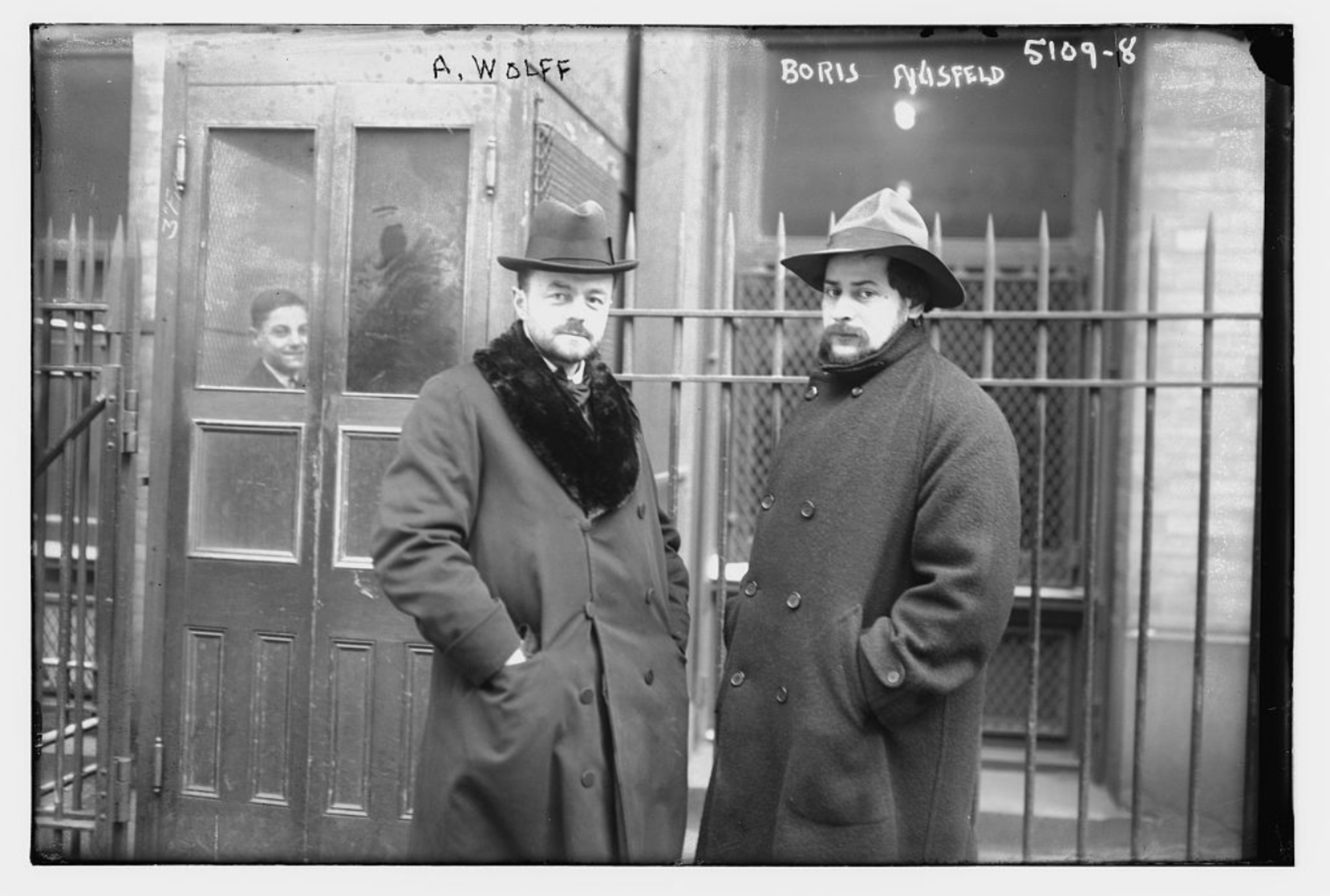
Albert Wolff and Boris Anisfeld at a rehearsal for L'oiseau bleu at the Metropolitan Opera in 1919

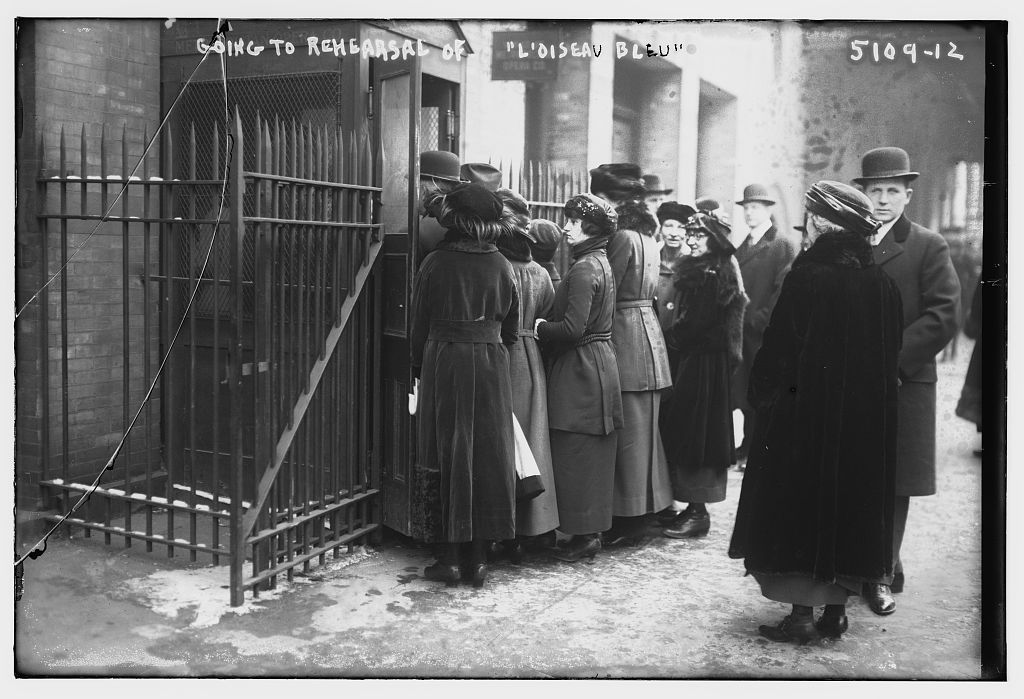
Going to rehearsal of L'oiseau bleu in 1919

L'oiseau bleu (The Blue Bird) is an opera in four acts (eight tableaux) by the French composer and conductor Albert Wolff. The libretto by Maurice Maeterlinck is based on his 1908 play of the same name. Boris Anisfeld designed the sets.

== Performance history ==
It was first performed at the Metropolitan Opera House, New York City on 27 December 1919.

Maeterlinck, the playwright and Nobel laureate, was present at the premiere, which, in the immediate aftermath of World War I, was a benefit for four charities: the Queen of the Belgians Fund, the Millerand Fund for French Orphans, the Three Big Sister Organizations (Catholic, Protestant, Jewish), and the Milk for the Children of America Fund.

The first Belgian performance was on 21 April 1920, and it was revived at the Théâtre de la Monnaie on 14 February 1956, conducted by the composer.

== Roles ==
Role	Voice type	Premiere cast, 27 December 1919 Conductor: Albert Wolff
Tyltyl	mezzo-soprano	Raymonde Delaunois
Mytyl	soprano	Mary Ellis
Mother Tyl	soprano	Florence Easton
Father Tyl	baritone	Paolo Ananian
Grandmother Tyl	mezzo-soprano	Louise Berat
Grandfather Tyl	bass	Léon Rothier
Maternal Love	soprano	Florence Easton
Joy of Understanding	soprano	Gladys Axman
Light	mezzo-soprano	Flora Perini
Father Time	bass	Leon Rothier
Bread	baritone	Mario Laurenti
Milk	soprano	Marie Tiffany
The little girl	soprano	Edna Kellogg
Two little lovers	mezzo-soprano, contralto	Minnie Egener, Helena Marsh
Joy of Being Just	-	Margaret Farnham
Joy of Seeing What is Beautiful	mezzo-soprano	Cecil Arden
The fairy	contralto	Jeanne Gordon
Night	mezzo-soprano	Frances Ingram
The cat	soprano	Margaret Romaine
The dog	-	Robert Couzinou
Mme Berlingot	contralto	Jeanne Gordon
Happiness	soprano	Mary Mellish
The child	-	Ada Vosari
Sugar	tenor	Octave Dua
Fire	tenor	Angelo Badà
Another child	-	Miss Kennedy
First child	-	Miss Belleri
Second child	-	Miss Florence
Third child	-	Miss Borniggia
Fourth child	soprano	Phyllis White
Fifth child	-	Miss Manetti

== Synopsis ==
Tyltyl and Mytyl are the children of a poor wood-chopper. At Christmas there is no tree or Christmas stocking for them. When the parents believe them safely tucked up in bed, the children creep out and watch through the window the preparations being made for the holiday in a wealthy neighbour’s home across the way.

While they are absorbed in this, Fairy Berylune enters. She is a witch who demands from the children that they bring her the grass that sings, and the bird that is blue so that her own little child who is sick may be restored to health and happiness. Upon agreeing to find the bird, the fairy crowns Tyltyl with a magic cap set with a wonderful diamond, which has power to disclose the past and future, and to turn inanimate objects and animals into speaking creatures. Everything around the children begins to take life and voice: milk, sugar, light, bread, the fire, cat and dog.

Suddenly the window opens and the children set off on their quest. They go first to the Land of Memory, then the Palace of the Night, Garden of Happiness, the Cemetery and then the Kingdom of the Future, but cannot capture the blue bird. They return home to bed.

When morning comes, a neighbour who looks like the Fairy enters to beg for a blue bird so that her sick child may be cured by the sight of it. Looking around, the children are amazed to see that their own turtle dove has turned blue. They gladly offer it for the sick child, and with the gift the invalid’s spirits return. When Tyltyl asks for its return and the child shows reluctance to give it back, the blue bird escapes from both and flies off.
