= Yvonne Brothier =

French operatic singer

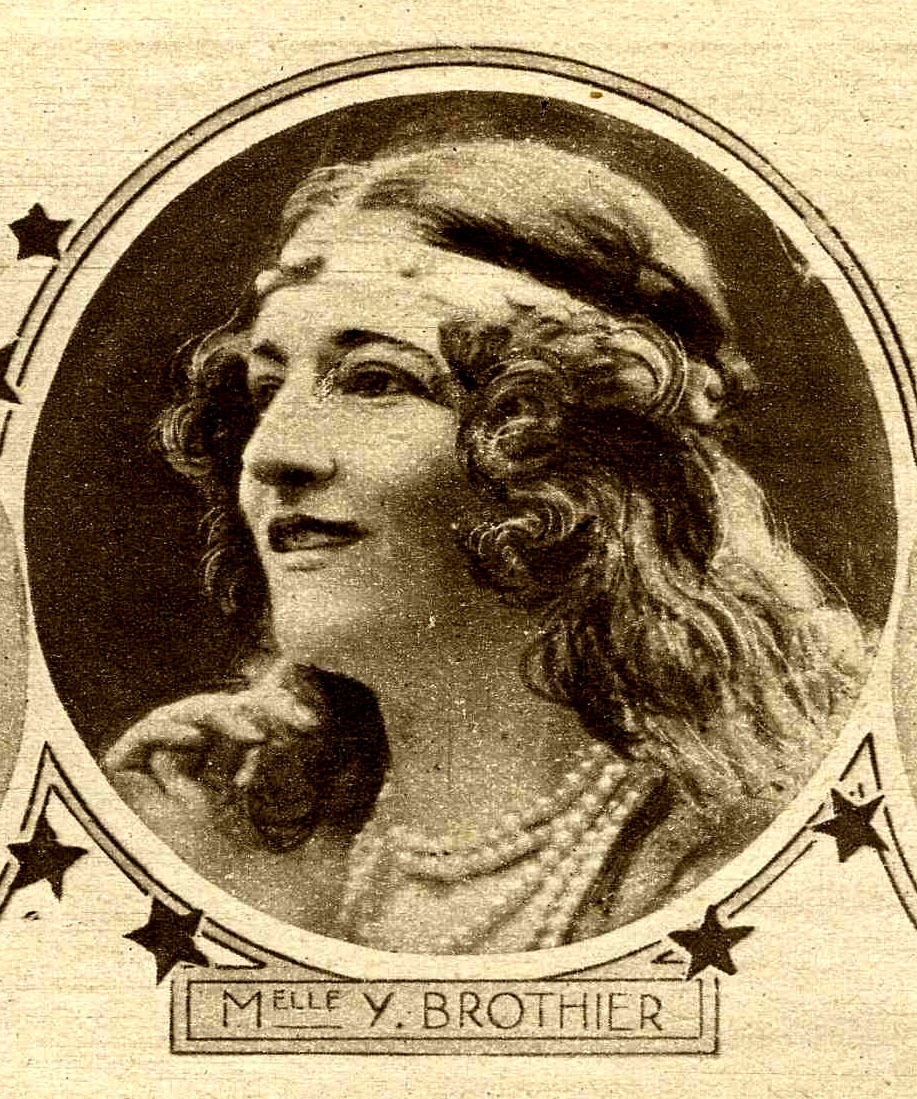
Yvonne Brothier

Yvonne Brothier (born 6 June 1889 in Saint-Julien-l'Ars, Vienne, died in Paris, 22 January 1967) was a soprano operatic singer who worked principally at the Opéra-Comique, Paris.

After singing in Brussels in 1914, she made her début at the Opéra-comique on 13 February 1916 in Lakmé by Delibes. She went on to create roles in Louis Aubert's La forêt bleue (Red Riding Hood) (French premiere), Graziella (title role), Marcel Samuel-Rousseau's Le Hulla (Dilara), Raoul Laparra's Le joueur de viole (the young girl), Fauré's Masques et Bergamasques, Charles-Henri Maréchal's Ping-Sin (title role) and Sylvio Lazzari's Le sauteriot (Orti).

Her repertoire at the Opéra-Comique also included Rosina (The Barber of Seville), Micaëla (Carmen), Olympia (Les contes d'Hoffmann), Melisande (Pelléas et Mélisande), Mireille, Rosenn (Le roi d'Ys), Minka (Le roi malgré lui) and Zaire (Les Indes galantes).

On 26 November 1921, Yvonne Brothier sang the la Marseillaise and airs from Mireille and The Barber of Seville over the radio from the Sainte-Assise transmitter. Her voice reached the rooms of the Lutetia forty kilometres away in Paris.

Brothier appeared at the Paris Opera in 1931 in the first performance of Virginie by Alfred Bruneau, later singing Sophie in Der Rosenkavalier and Rosine in The Barber of Seville (both in French). She also sang in Amsterdam, La Scala and in Spain and north Africa.

She retired in 1940 and devoted herself to teaching. Her husband was the composer Henri Moreau-Febvre.

== Recordings ==
Brothier sang Micaëla in the complete recording of Carmen conducted by Piero Coppola, and an abridged Pelléas et Mélisande (1927), as well as individual items from roles she sang on stage.
