= Madame Chrysanthème (opera) =

1893 opera by André Messager

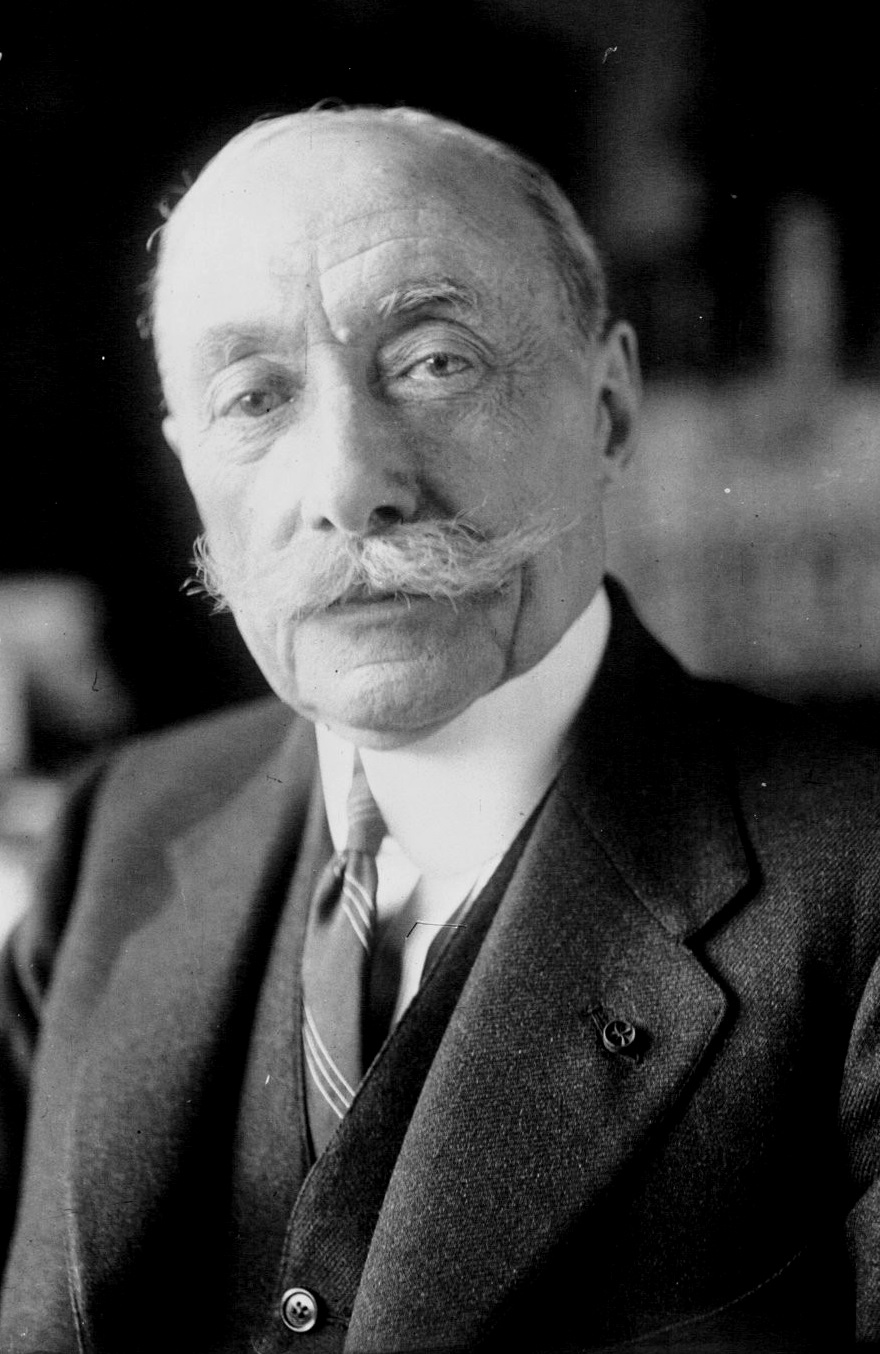
André Messager, 1921

Madame Chrysanthème (Madam Chrysanthemum) is an opera, described as a comédie lyrique, with music by André Messager to a libretto by Georges Hartmann and Alexandre André, after the semi-autobiographical novel Madame Chrysanthème (1887) by Pierre Loti. It consists of four acts with a prologue and an epilogue and is set in Nagasaki, Japan.

== Background ==
Prior to Madame Chrysanthème, Messager had begun to establish himself as a composer with several ballet scores performed, success at the Opéra-Comique in 1890 with La Basoche and incidental music for the play Hélène in 1891. Refused by Léon Carvalho at the Opéra-Comique Madame Chrysanthème was first performed at the Théâtre de la Renaissance in Paris on 21 January 1893 with Jane Guy and Louis Delaquerrière in the principal roles; there were 16 performances at the theatre in the first year.

There were two performances in Monte Carlo on 21 December 1901 and 3 January 1902 with Mary Garden and Edmond Clément in the principal roles. The opera was also seen at the Théâtre Royal de la Monnaie, Brussels, on 9 November 1906, in Montreal in 1912, and by the Chicago Opera Association in Chicago and New York (Lexington Theatre) in 1920 with Tamaki Miura, Charles Fontaine and Hector Dufranne.

Although both operas can be traced back to the same original literary source, Puccini's Madama Butterfly (1904) (Note: Madama Butterfly uses a 1898 short story by John Luther Long, and the 1900 one-act play by David Belasco, which Puccini saw; Long's story is assumed to be based on Loti's work.) and Madame Chrysanthème contrast strongly especially with the mainly internal world of the Puccini setting. The alternation of acts in public and private spaces in Messager's work provides other aspects on the Japan as depicted in the opera, reminding the listener of a teeming world effectively beyond the reach of Europeans: between Messager and Puccini there is a significant contrast between Pierre's failure to understand and master Chrysanthème and Pinkerton's dominance and possession of Butterfly. Messager's librettists changed Loti's original cynical attachment between the main characters into a more genuine love affair, as well as creating the jealous conflict between the two sailors.

A highlight of the score is the soprano aria "Le jour sous le soleil béni...".

== Roles ==
Roles, voice types, premiere cast
Role	Voice type	Premiere cast, 12 December 1893 Conductor: André Messager
Pierre	tenor	Louis Delaquerrière
Monsieur Kangourou	tenor	Charles Lamy
Yves	baritone	Jacquin
Monsieur Sucre	bass	Declercq
Un gabier (topman)	–	Gesta
Premièr Officier René	bass	Chassaing
Deuxieme Officer Charles	bass	Halary
Madame Chrysanthème	soprano	Jane Guy
Madame Prune	contralto	Caisso
Oyouki	soprano	Nettie Lynds
Madame Fraise	mezzo-soprano	Micot
Madame Jonquille	soprano	Alberty
Madame Campanulle	soprano	Dica
Chorus: Officers, sailors, Europeans, Japanese

== Synopsis ==
=== Prologue ===
On the bridge of a French battleship, two officers, Pierre and Yves are leaning on the balustrade while the topman sings. Pierre recalls his dream of a Japanese love affair. A naval fanfare announces the arrival in port.

=== Act 1 ===
On arrival in Nagasaki the ship is invaded by merchants, who are then followed by geishas, who dance. Pierre immediately falls in love with one of them. Born in Yeddo she was abandoned as a child. Before she can give Pierre her name Yves announces the arrival of Kangarou, a jack-of-all-trades, who is a marriage broker. The young woman's adopted parents Sucre and Prune are introduced. Pierre contracts a "Japanese marriage" with his chosen geisha, and at the end of the act Kangarou announces her name: Chrysanthème.

=== Act 2 ===
In the Chrysanthème's garden, Prune pays devotions to Buddha. She parts the screens behind which Chrysanthème and Pierre still sleep. Chrysanthème arranges flowers around the house. Pierre declares his love, but Chrysanthème chides him. At the end Pierre and Chrysanthème's friends arrive and congratulate the couple and Oyouki sings in Breton mode.

=== Act 3 ===
In front of the temple of Osueva a festival takes place with a chants and dances. After Chrysanthème sings her song, Pierre is furious and jealous arguments break out between Yves and Pierre. A procession of priests pass by.

=== Act 4 ===
Chrysanthème and Oyouki are heard in the distance. Pierre enters the garden and reflects on the emotions evoked by his love. There is a reconciliation between the characters. A cannon shot is heard, and Yves enters joyfully looking forward to his return to his family in Brittany. After farewells, Chrysanthème gives Yves a letter to pass on to Pierre once they are at sea.

=== Epilogue ===
Out at sea Pierre reads Chrysanthème's letter. She writes that although she was smiling when they parted, he should remember, when far away, that in Japan there are women who love, and cry. He tosses the lotus flowers she had given him into the sea and asks to forget his Japanese marriage.

== Notes and references ==
Notes
