= Emmanuel Bondeville =

French composer

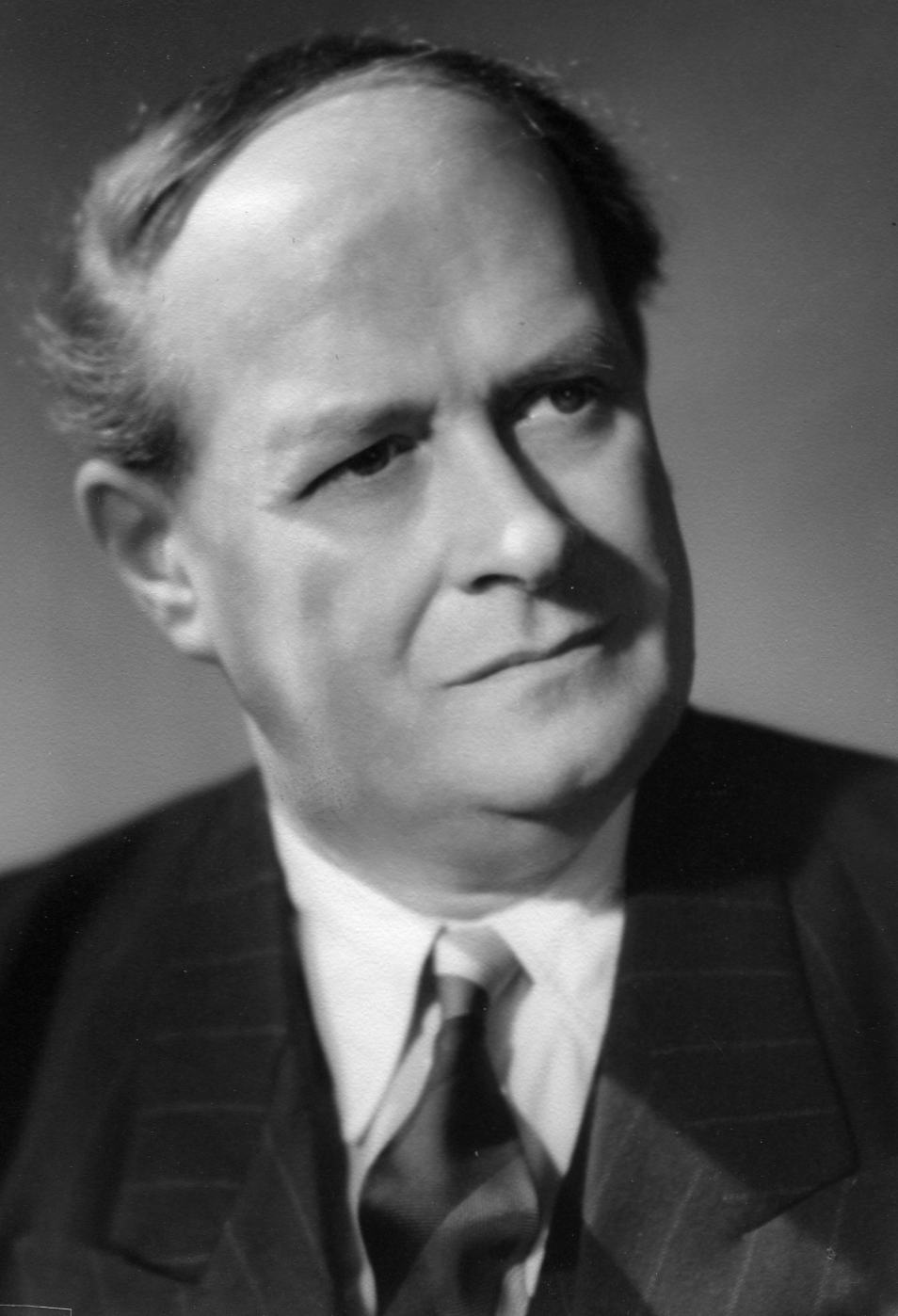
Emmanuel Bondeville

Emmanuel Bondeville was a French composer and music administrator, born 29 October 1898 in Rouen, and died 26 November 1987 in Paris. He was a member of the Académie des Beaux-Arts.

== Biography ==
As a young man he was organist at the church of Saint-Nicaise in Rouen and Notre-Dame in Caen. Bondeville lost both his parents when he was 16, and took on various jobs – organist, bank clerk, translator - to get by. He made his beginnings in music around 1923 writing works for piano, symphonic poems, opéras-comiques and opéras. During this time he also travelled around Europe and worked as an assistant in a music shop. He eventually had lessons in harmony and counterpoint from Jean Déré. In 1935 he became musical director of the radio stations Radio Tour Eiffel, Radio Paris, Radiodiffusion française then artistic director of Radio Monte-Carlo.

The French Radio was relocated to Marseille but the Vichy government sacked Bondeville because he was not pro-regime; however when the radio returned to Paris in 1943 and Bondeville was asked to take on the musical directorship, he organized festivals of French composers in defiance of Nazi propaganda. He put on the Berlioz Requiem under Munch at the Opéra in November 1943 and a Berlioz festival, followed by events for Lalo and Chabrier in July and ones for Saint-Saëns and Fauré in August.

From 1949 to 1951 Bondeville was director of the Opéra-Comique, followed by a similar position at the Opéra de Paris from 1952 to 1969.

He was married three times, among which to the mezzo-soprano Viorica Cortez, to whom he dedicated his opera Antoine et Cléopâtre, and later to Dominique Plessis (with whom he broadcast programmes entitled ‘Une saison d'opéra’ on France-Inter).

== Works ==
- Les Illustrations, symphonic triptych, comprising :
  - Le Bal des pendus based on Les Illuminations by Rimbaud (first performed 6 December 1930 by the Lamoureux Orchestra under Albert Wolff)
  - Ophélie (1931)
  - Marine (1933)
- L'École des maris (opéra-comique after Molière), premiered at the Opéra-Comique on 19 June 1935 conducted by Albert Wolff
- Madame Bovary, drame lyrique after Flaubert, premiered at the Opéra-Comique on 1 June 1951 in a production by Louis Musy, conducted by Albert Wolff, with Jacqueline Brumaire in the title role.
- Illustrations pour Faust, (1942)
- Gaultier-Garguille, symphonic poem, (1951)
- Symphonie lyrique, (1956)
- Symphonie chorégraphique (1961)
- Antoine et Cléopatre, opera (1972) premiered at the Opéra de Rouen on 8 March 1974 in a production by Margherita Wallmann, conducted by Paul Ethuin, with Maurice Maievsky and Viorica Cortez in the title roles.

== Titles, honours ==
- Commandeur de la Légion d'honneur
- Commandeur de l'Ordre des Arts et des Lettres
- Grand Officier de l'Ordre national du Mérite
- Croix de guerre 1914-1918
