= Louis Delaquerrière =

French opera singer

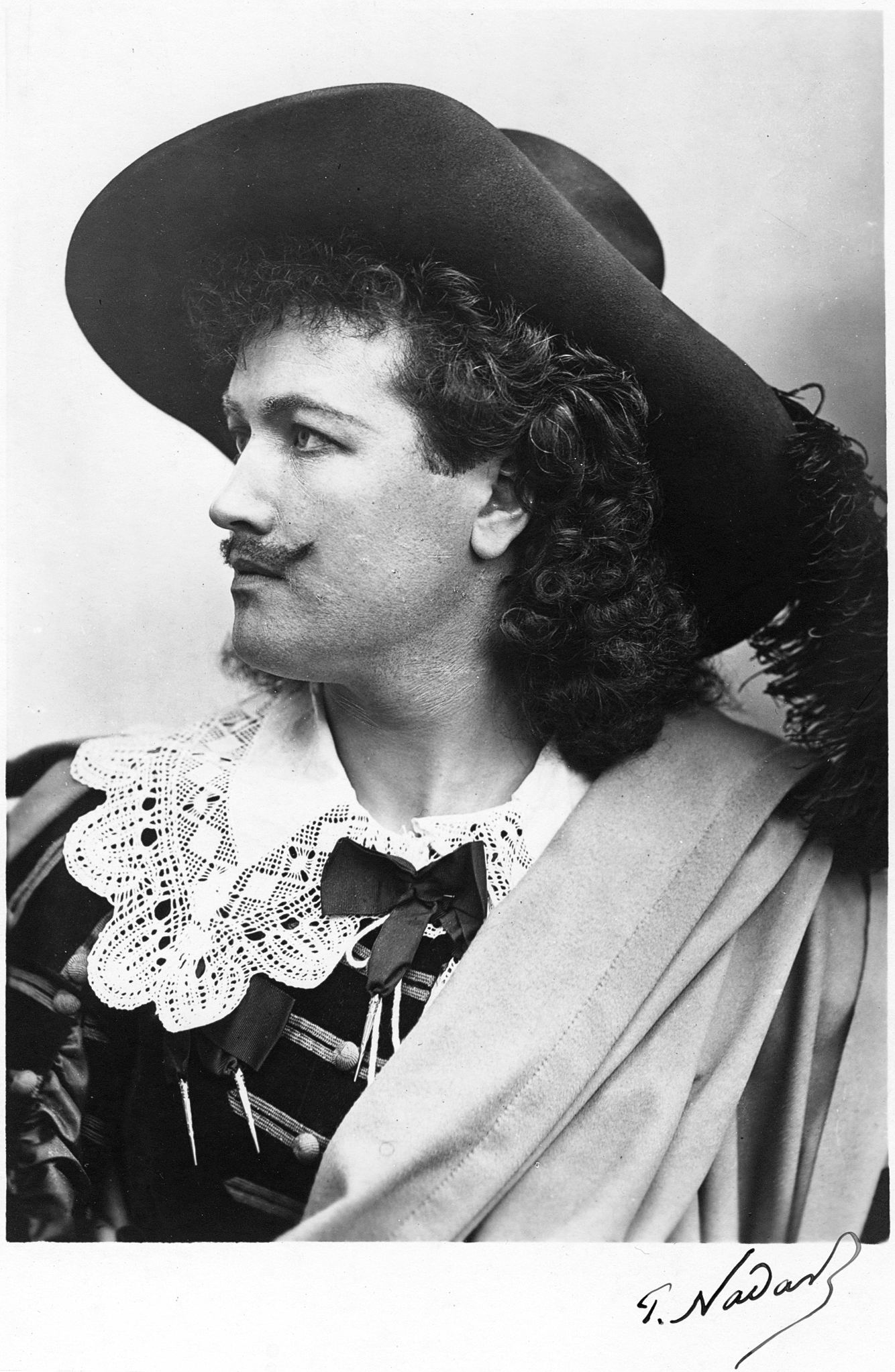

Louis-Achille Delaquerrière, who was born in Les Loges, France 24 February 1856 and died in Paris 11 September 1937, was a French opera singer, and later a voice pedagogue, active in France.

== Life and career ==
As a child he was a pupil in the choir of Rouen Cathedral. Although rejected as a student at the Paris Conservatoire, Louis became a pupil of Louise de Miramont-Tréogate (whom he subsequently married), and later served on the Paris Conservatoire's Admissions jury panel (1910) and its Concours jury for 1929 and 1933. He attended l'École Niedermeyer (piano, organ, composition) and was also coached by Jean-Baptiste Faure with whom Louise herself had studied.

Louis made his debut at the Opéra-Comique as Daniel in Le chalet on 16 March 1881.

At La Monnaie in Brussels, Delaquerrière sang Wagner in Méphistophélès by Boito in 1883, created a role in Le panache blanc (by Philippe Flon) and sang L'abbé in Le trésor (by Charles Lefebvre) in 1884, created David in the local premiere of Les maîtres chanteurs de Nuremberg (translated by Victor Wilder) and appeared in Joli Gilles (Ferdinand Poise) in 1885.

He sang in Geneva for a season then returned to the Opéra-Comique. There he sang in Mignon (Wilhelm), La dame blanche (Georges), La Traviata (Alfredo), Carmen (Don José), L'Ombre (by Flotow), Le postillon de Lonjumeau, and created Le comte de Nangis in Chabrier's Le roi malgré lui (1887). At the 100th performance of Le Barbier de Séville at the Opéra-Comique on 25 Feb 1887, he sang Almaviva with Mézeray as Rosine and Soulacroix as Figaro; other roles with the company included Mergy in Le pré aux clercs and Alexis in Le déserteur.

The singer was on good terms with several contemporary artists and composers; his close friendship with Chabrier resulted in a proposal to mount a concert of the composer's works in Royan in 1888, where Delaquerrière was enjoying success; Chabrier in one of his most bitter letters tore the idea to shreds. Among his papers were letters from composers of his time, as well as manuscripts, including one of Liszt.

Delaquerrière appeared at Monte Carlo in early 1889, singing Vincent in Mireille, Philémon in Philémon et Baucis, Wilhelm Meister in Mignon, Sylvain in Les Dragons de Villars and Don José in Carmen.

In January 1893 he sang Pierre in the premiere of Messager's Madame Chrysanthème at the Salle de la Renaissance du Théâtre-Lyrique, where he also sang in Fra Diavolo, Le Barbier de Séville and Obéron.

He left the stage while still young (1899) to devote his time to vocal teaching.

For 25 years, both the Paris Opéra and Opéra-Comique recruited artists at his School. Among his pupils were well-known opera singers such as Edmond Clément, Lucienne Bréval and Paul Franz. Emma Calvé, although not a pupil, came to rehearse at the Delaquerrière home, particularly while they were all in Brussels at the same time.

His son was José Delaquerrière (born Paris 16 September 1886, died Montreal 10 April 1978), also a tenor, known for his leading roles in operetta, whose early musical training in Paris was provided by his parents. In his book Savoir chanter (first published 1976 (Éd. Mondex), 2nd edition 2008 (Éd. Delaquerrière Richardson, Montréal)), José covers the theoretical and practical aspects of the Delaquerrière School of French singing. Those portions of Louis and José's personal notebooks related to voice topics were transcribed and translated by Sophie Louise Roland in her D. Mus. document.
