= Adèle Isaac =

French operatic soprano

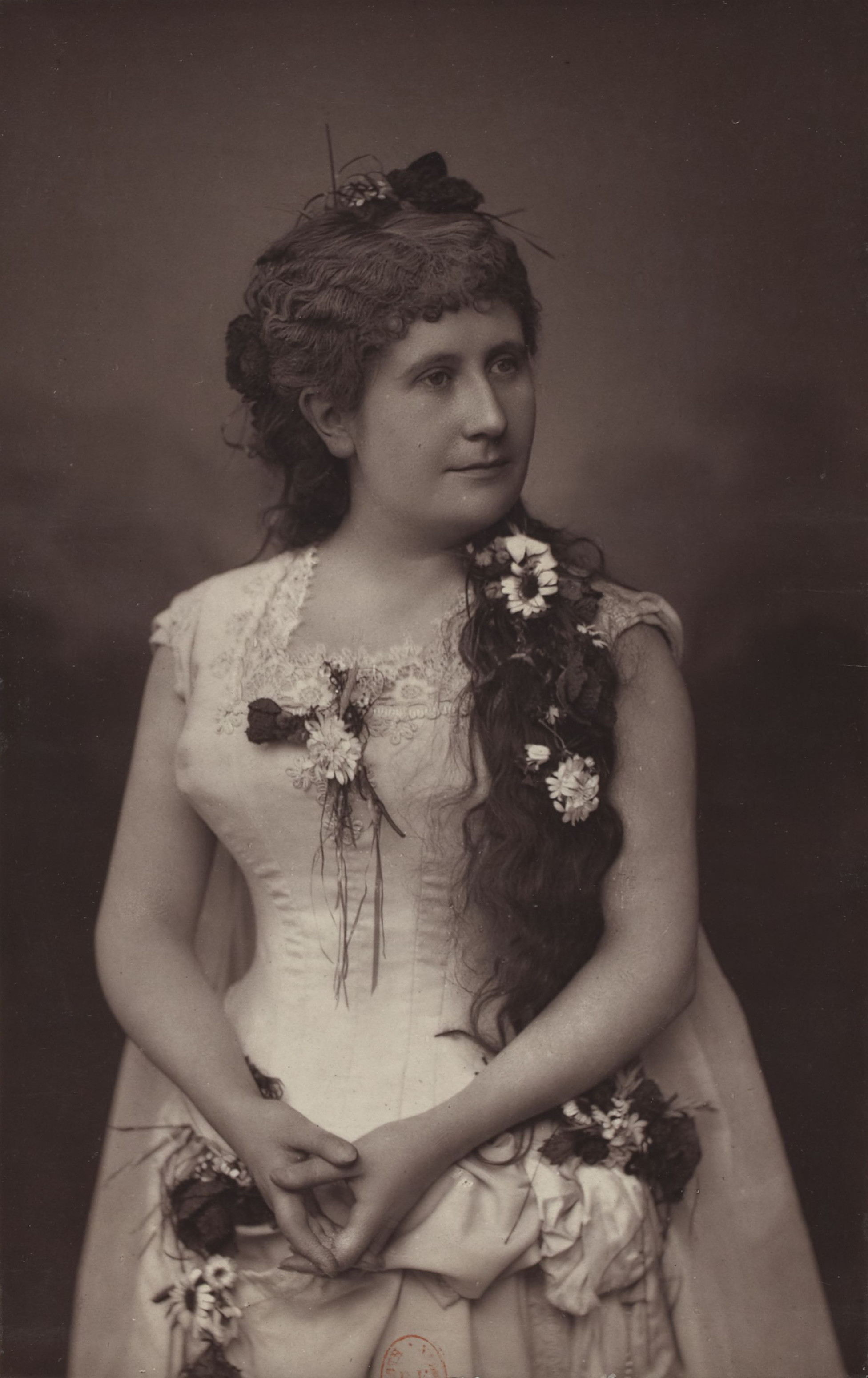
Adèle Isaac

Adèle Isaac (8 January 1854 – 22 October 1915) was a French operatic soprano, active in Paris in the late 19th century.

Isaac was born in Calais. After studying with Gilbert Duprez, her professional debut was in 1870 in Victor Massé's Les noces de Jeannette at the Théatre Montmartre. In February 1873 she attracted attention singing the young shepherd in Tannhäuser at La Monnaie (Bruxelles). Her first performance at the Opéra-Comique was in 1873 as Marie in La fille du régiment, going on to sing Mozart and Gounod. On 3 April 1882 she sang Angèle in the 1,000th performance of Le Domino Noir at the Opéra-Comique.

From 1883 to 1885 she appeared at the Opéra as Ophélia, Marguerite, Adele, Zerlina and Marguerite de Valois.

She sang in the first Paris revival of Carmen in April 1883, and was chosen for the more restrained, even bland interpretation of the title role she offered.

She created the roles of Olympia and Antonia in Les contes d'Hoffmann in 1881, Claire in Egmont by Salvayre in 1886, and Minka in Le roi malgré lui in 1887. Isaac was a great favourite at the Opéra-Comique: she sang Susanna in the 1882, 1886 and 1892 revivals of Le Nozze di Figaro. Her absence for a concert tour in Rome and Monte Carlo in early 1888 delayed repeat performances of Le roi malgré lui, and may have contributed to the end of its first run.

In 1884 Adèle Isaac sang in the annual performances of Beethoven's 9th Symphony given at the Société des Concerts du Conservatoire; the following year she sang music from Egmont and The Magic Flute with the same orchestra.

In 1887 she married businessman Charles Lelong; she retired in 1894. She died in Paris.
