= The Barber of Seville (1948 film) =

1948 film

- Directed by: Jean Loubignac
- Based on: The Barber of Seville by Pierre Beaumarchais
- Produced by: Claude Dolbert
- Cinematography: René Colas
- Edited by: Fanchette Mazin
- Music by: Gioachino Rossini
- Production company: Codo Cinéma
- Distributed by: Les Réalisations d'Art Cinématographique
- Release date: 19 May 1948
- Running time: 98 minutes
- Country: France
- Language: French

The Barber of Seville (French: Le Barbier de Séville) is a 1948 French musical film directed by Jean Loubignac It is a screen version of the 1816 opera by Rossini based on the 1775 play by Beaumarchais (in the translation by Castil-Blaze). Filmed at the Billancourt Studios in Paris it uses the Théâtre national de l'Opéra-Comique production of the time. It was filmed in 1947, released in May 1948, and lasts around 95 minutes. The film's sets were designed by the art director Louis Le Barbenchon.

The opera had been seen at all the principal lyric theatres in Paris; at the Salle Favart it had been performed over 500 times by the time of the film, which features several popular singers from the company.

== Cast ==
- Roger Bussonnet as Figaro
- Raymond Amade as Almaviva
- Lucienne Jourfier as Rosine
- Louis Musy as Don Bartolo
- Roger Bourdin as Don Bazile
- Renée Gilly as Marceline
- Jean Vieuille as Pédrille
- Gustave Wion as L'Officier
- Serge Rallier as L'Alcade
- Jean Retty as Le Notaire

The chorus and orchestra of the Opéra-Comique are conducted by André Cluytens.

== Bibliography ==
- Goble, Alan. The Complete Index to Literary Sources in Film. Walter de Gruyter, 1999.
