= Jean Vieuille =

French opera singer

- Born: 14 February 1902; Paris, France
- Died: 6 April 1967 (aged 65) Saint-Georges-de-Didonne, France
- Genres: opera

Jean Vieuille (French pronunciation: [ʒɑ̃ vjœj]) was a French bass-baritone singer (born Paris, 14 February 1902, died Saint-Georges-de-Didonne, 6 April 1967) who enjoyed a long stage career mainly centred at the Paris Opéra-Comique.

== Life and career ==
His teachers were Albert Carré, Léon David and his uncle, Félix Vieuille.

He made his debut as the Count in Le Nozze di Figaro by Mozart in 1926 at the Théâtre Trianon Lyrique, and undertook a season at the Théâtre Municipal in Strasbourg.

From 1928 to 1958 Vieuille sang mainly at the Paris Opéra-Comique, and from 1950 also at the Paris Opéra. His repertoire included Carmagnola in Les Brigands, Nicklauss and Lindorf in Les Contes d'Hoffmann, Dancaïre and Escamillo in Carmen, Angelotti in Tosca, Melot in Tristan und Isolde, Marcel in La bohème, and Albert in Werther.

He sang in the premieres of La Peau de Chagrin by Charles Levadé (1929), Le Sicilien by Omer Letorey (1930), Gargantua by Antoine Mariotte (1935), Ginevra by Marcel Bertrand (1942), Guignol by André Bloch (1949), Marion ou La Belle au Tricorne by Pierre Wissmer (1951) and Dolores by Michel-Maurice Levy (1952).

In 1948 he appeared in a Jean Loubignac film Le Barbier de Séville (based on the Rossini opera), as Pédrille.

== Recordings ==
Vieuille sang in complete 1950s recordings of Carmen (conducted by Albert Wolff, and by André Cluytens), as Brétigny in Manon (with Pierre Monteux), Pelléas et Mélisande (conducted by Cluytens) and La Poule noire (conducted by Richard Blareau). He had previously recorded songs from Ciboulette, Monsieur Beaucaire, La Mascotte and Véronique and mélodies by Hahn for Parlophone.
