= Louis Musy =

French opera singer

Louis Musy (22 October 1902, in Algeria – 19 October 1981) was a French operatic baritone and stage director principally active at the Paris Opéra-Comique. His teacher was Léon David.

He made his debut in Le Chemineau by Leroux in 1925 at the Opéra-Comique and went on to sing many other French and Italian roles in the Opéra-Comique repertoire.

Musy was a member of the four-member committee which ran the Opéra-Comique after the liberation of Paris during 1944. From 1947 he was a director of staging at the theatre. His pupils included Xavier Depraz, Jean Dupouy, Jacques Loreau, Irène Sicot and Remy Corazza.

== Roles created ==
In addition to Paris premieres of several operas, he took part in the world premieres of:

- Son ami in Le pauvre matelot by Milhaud 1927
- Dandin in Georges Dandin by d'Ollone, 1930
- Le roi in Le roi d'Yvetot by Ibert, 1930
- Balthazar in Le roi bossu by Barraine, 1932
- Sganarelle in L'Ecole des maris by Bondeville, 1935
- Minzit in Mon oncle Benjamin by Bousquet, 1942

== Recordings ==
He sang in recordings of Carmen in 1927 (as Escamillo), Faust in 1930 (Valentin), The Tales of Hoffmann in 1948 (Lindorf), and Louise in 1956 (Father); as well as L'école des maris by Emmanuel Bondeville in 1954 (Sganarelle), and Les mousquetaires au couvent 1957 (Bridaine) and La fille de Madame Angot in 1958 (Larivaudière).

He played Dr. Bartolo in the 1948 Opéra-Comique film of Le Barbier de Séville directed by Jean Loubignac and conducted by André Cluytens.
