= Jacqueline Brumaire =

French opera singer

Jacqueline Brumaire (born Herblay, 5 November 1921, died in Nancy 29 October 2000) was a French operatic soprano and later teacher.

== Life and career ==
After training at the Conservatoire de Paris under Madeleine Mathieu, she debuted on 13 October 1946 at the Opéra-Comique as the Countess in Le nozze di Figaro. She then embarked on a successful career at that opera house, being admired particularly in roles for lyric soprano from French and Italian operas: Mimi in La bohème, Micaëla in Carmen, the title heroine in Massenet's Manon, Antonia in Les contes d'Hoffmann, Fiordiligi in Così fan tutte, and Mireille in Gounod's opera under the same title.

She sang Emma Bovary in the 1951 Opéra-Comique premiere of the opera Madame Bovary by Emmanuel Bondeville (in 1962 she sang in the same opera at the Paris Opéra). At Paris Opéra she had a very successful career in her singing roles including Juliette in Roméo et Juliette by Gounod, Donna Elvira in Don Giovanni, Pamina in Die Zauberflöte, and Violetta in La Traviata. She also performed in the other main opera houses in France: Marseille, Nice, Bordeaux, Strasbourg, Lyon and Toulouse. In 1956 she debuted at La Scala, Milan as Fiordiligi in Così fan tutte, in 1957 as Louise in the opera of the same name by Charpentier, in the season of 1956–57 as Concepción in L'heure espagnole by Maurice Ravel.

She appeared as a guest in Johannesburg (1957) and in Prague (1967), in the Opéra Royal de Wallonie (1964 in the title role in Thaïs by Massenet) and in Oran (1961). In 1962 she took part in Toulouse at the premiere of the opera Hop! Signor by Manuel Rosenthal.

She sang the title role in Esclarmonde by Massenet on 19 November 1963 during the concert performance of that opera for RTF (Radiodiffusion-Télévision Française). In 1969 she sang the role of Hélen (Elena) during the concert performance of Les vêpres siciliennes which was made available as a commercial recording.

From her other versatile stage repertoire, she sang Konstanze in Die Entführung aus dem Serail, the Marschallin in the Der Rosenkavalier, Renata in The Fiery Angel by Prokofiev (Opéra-Comique, 1967), and Béatrice in Un sguardo sul ponte by Renzo Rossellini (Bordeaux 1965, possibly the first French performance of that opera).

In 1981 she started to teach at the Conservatoire in Nancy, preparing among others Chinese singers for their first performances of Carmen in the People's Republic of China. From 1992 up to her death she was a member of the Académie de Stanislas in Nancy. She published an autobiography La Baraka ou si Jacqueline Brumaire m'était contée.

== Discography ==
Her recordings include albums collections of various arias for Philips and also some for Decca. She took part in recordings of Les Malheurs d'Orphée and Le Pauvre Matelot by Darius Milhaud (conducted by the composer) for Adès (1956), Pribaoutki and Les noces under Boulez (Concert Hall), sang Duchesse Hélène in Les vêpres siciliennes (BBC/Opera Rara) and Rosalinde (Carolina) in Chauve Souris for EMI France. For EMI she also recorded highlights from Massenet's Thaïs. In 1952 she sang the soprano part in the recording of Mozart's Coronation Mass by the Pasdeloup Orchestra directed by Alphonse Hoch, Pathe 33 DT 1015.
