= Albert Wolff (conductor) =

French conductor and composer (1884–1970)

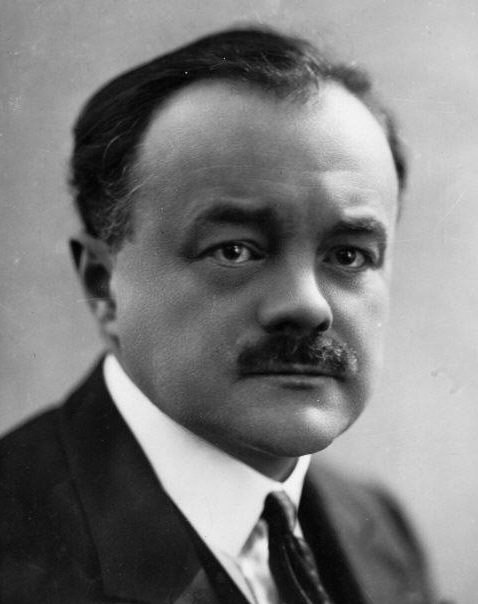
Albert Wolff

Albert Louis Wolff (19 January 1884 – 20 February 1970) was a French conductor and composer of Dutch descent. Most of his career was spent in European venues, with the exception of two years that he spent as a conductor at the Metropolitan Opera and a few years in Buenos Aires during the Second World War. He is most known for holding the position of principal conductor with the Opéra-Comique in Paris for several years. He was married to the French mezzo-soprano Simone Ballard.

== Biography ==
=== Early life and education ===
Wolff was born in Paris, of Dutch parents, though he was a French citizen from birth, never lived in the Netherlands, and never had a Dutch passport. When only 12 years old, he began his musical education at the Paris Conservatoire. There, he studied with such teachers as André Gedalge, Xavier Leroux, and Paul Antonin Vidal. At the same time he played the piano in cabarets and was organist at the Église Saint-Thomas-d'Aquin (Paris) for four years. Upon graduation at the age of 22, Wolff was awarded first prizes in harmony and accompaniment.

=== Early career ===
In 1906 Wolff joined the staff of the Opéra-Comique, the theatre which became the centre of his career, while leading ensembles elsewhere in the city of Paris. He made his conducting debut at an opera gala in Strasbourg (then under German control) on 9 May 1909, following this by getting as much experience as possible with many short engagements in all operatic genres around France. Meanwhile, in 1908, Wolff was appointed chorus master at the Opéra-Comique. This was his first experience with any form of stage work. He remained in that position for three years before being given an opportunity to conduct the premiere of Laparra's La jota. Impressed with his performance, the Opéra-Comique took him with them to Argentina in 1911 where he conducted the Buenos Aires premiere of Pelléas et Mélisande at the Teatro Colón. He later conducted the opera again in its premieres in Naples, Copenhagen, Kristiania (now Oslo) and Stockholm. In August 1910 Wolff conducted Fauré's incidental music in Georgette Leblanc's production of the play Pelléas and Mélisande in the cloisters and gardens of Saint-Wandrille abbey.

He continued as a conductor at the Opéra-Comique until the outbreak of World War I. Throughout that conflict, Wolff served his country first as at Les Éparges, then as a pilot (including a tour of Morocco), and was decorated for his courage.

At the end of the war, Wolff went to the United States to join the conducting staff at the Metropolitan Opera, replacing Pierre Monteux in the French repertoire. His made his debut on 21 November 1919, with Gounod's Faust, and on 5 January 1922 led the company's premiere of Lalo's Le roi d'Ys. While with the company he was able to conduct twelve performances of his own opera L'oiseau bleu, its premiere being in the presence of Maurice Maeterlinck on whose play it was based. Although Wolff's work at the Met received consistently positive reviews from critics, he left the company two weeks after the Lalo premiere.

=== Later career ===
Wolff returned to the Opéra-Comique in 1921, succeeding André Messager as chief conductor, a position he held for the next three years. He notably conducted the first Paris performances of L'enfant et les sortileges and Angélique by Ibert, and the world premiere of Le brebis égarée (1923) by Milhaud. Around this same time, he founded the Concerts Modernes Paris to provide a medium for the public performance of new works. In 1924 he resigned his post at the Opéra-Comique and became musical director of the Théâtre des Champs-Élysées.

In 1925 he became second conductor of the Concerts Pasdeloup, greatly extending his work in purely orchestral music (including an appearance at the Royal Albert Hall, London in 1926); he later served as head conductor and director of the Pasdeloup from 1934 to 1940. From 1928 to 1934 he became principal conductor of the Orchestre Lamoureux. He notably conducted the premiere of Roussel's 4th symphony (which was dedicated to him) with the Orchestre Lamoureux in October 1935; he had previously made the premiere recording of Roussel's 3rd symphony with the Lamoureux. In 1938 he was twice a guest conductor at the Bergen Philharmonic Orchestra; in 1947 he conducted the same orchestra with Geirr Tveitt in a recording of the latter's 3rd piano concerto. He also conducted a radio performance of his own flute concerto with Per Wang as soloist with Oslo Philharmonic Orchestra on NRK.

Wolff conducted the premieres of the opéra-comiques L'École des maris (1935) and Madame Bovary (1951) by Emmanuel Bondeville.

In 1945 he became director of the Opéra-Comique for a short while. While there, he conducted the first performance of Poulenc's Les mamelles de Tirésias (1947) and although he resigned from the position not long after he took it, Wolff continued to conduct occasionally at the theatre up until his death in 1970. He conducted 124 performances of Pelléas et Mélisande at the house, more than any other conductor. He also became associated with the Paris Opera where he became a conductor beginning in 1949.

He died on 20 February 1970.

== Recordings ==
Having made a couple of records with the Berlin Philharmonic Orchestra in 1928, Albert Wolff made many recordings of French orchestral music for Polydor in Paris in the 1930s, along with some Russian pieces, and abridged versions of Faust and La Bohème (in French).

In the 1950s he set down opera and orchestral music for Decca, first in mono and later a few in stereo. His recordings included Carmen, and Bizet's complete music (in the context of the play) for L'Arlésienne. With the Paris Conservatoire Orchestra, his discography included Adam's Giselle (complete) and Glazunov's The Seasons, overtures by Berlioz, Auber, Hérold, Suppé, Nicolai and Řezníček, orchestral works by Falla, Ravel, Lalo and Franck, Gustave Charpentier's Impressions d'Italie and Massenet's Scènes Pittoresques and Scènes Alsaciennes. With the Pasdeloup Orchestra, he recorded Landowski's Symphony No. 1 'Jean de la Peur'.

Some of his opera recordings for French radio have subsequently been issued on CD, such as Adam's Le chalet (Gaité-Lyrique label), Massenet's Thaïs (Le Chant du Monde); he also recorded excerpts from Bondeville's L'École des maris (Decca/London).

== Works ==
=== Operas ===
- Sœur Béatrice (1911; Nice, 1948),
- Le marchand de masques (Nice, 1914),
- L'oiseau bleu (New York, 27 December 1919).

=== Ballet ===
- Le clochard, from a scenario by his son Pierre.

=== Music for orchestra ===
- La randonnée de l'âme défunte
- Concerto pour flûte (1943)
- Symphonie en la

=== Other works ===
- Requiem for soloists, choirs (Concerts Pasdeloup, 25 March 1939),
- Trois images marocaines for piano

Cultural offices
Preceded by Paul Paray	Principal Conductors, Lamoureux Orchestra; 1928–1934	Succeeded by Eugène Bigot
