= Va tacito e nascosto =

Opera aria by George Frideric Handel

- Aria from Giulio Cesare by George Frideric Handel
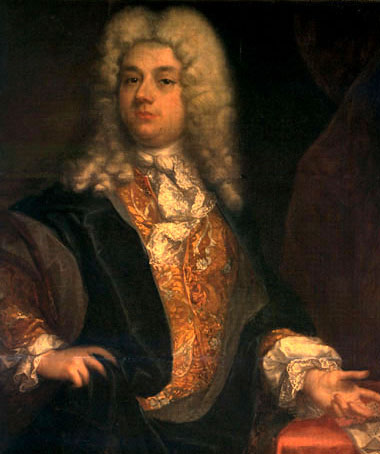
- Senesino, the first singer of the aria, c. 1720
- English: Silently and stealthily
- Text: Nicola Francesco Haym
- Language: Italian
- Performed: February 20, 1724

"Va tacito e nascosto" (Italian; translation, "Silently and stealthily goes") is an aria written for alto castrato voice in act 1 of George Frideric Handel's opera Giulio Cesare in Egitto, composed in 1724 to a libretto by Nicola Francesco Haym. Sung by the character Julius Caesar, it features extensive solos for natural horn.

== Words and music ==
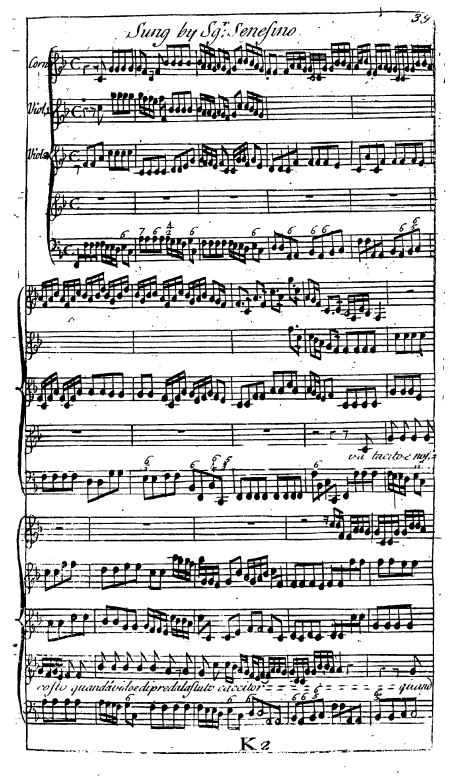
"Va tacito e nascosto" in the first published edition (1724, London)

=== Libretto ===
Va tacito e nascosto,
quand'avido è di preda,
l'astuto cacciator.

E chi è mal far disposto,
non brama che si veda
l'inganno del suo cor.

Prosaic translation
Silently and stealthily
goes the shrewd hunter
when he is hungry for game.

And he who loves evil
does not like to show
the mischief in his heart.

Singable text
How silently, how slyly,
When once the scent is taken,
the huntsman tracks the spoor.

The traitor shrewd and wily,
ne'er lets his prey awaken
unless the snare be sure.

The first verse of the text is used for the opening and final sections of the aria; the second verse for the middle section. Both verses have an identical rhyming scheme. The form of the verses is based on the style perfected by Metastasio, including the placement of poetic stress. Each line has seven sung syllables; the first two lines of each verse close with the stress on the penultimate syllable (versi piani), the final line of each with stress on the last syllable (verso tronco).

=== Music ===
George Frideric Handel composed his opera Giulio Cesare in Egitto (known also simply as Giulio Cesare) in 1724 to a libretto by Nicola Francesco Haym.

"Va tacito e nascosto" is set as a da capo aria sung by the character Julius Caesar in act 1, scene 9 of the opera, and is scored for strings and natural horn in F major. The vocal part is written for alto castrato voice, and was sung at the premiere by the celebrated performer Senesino. It is now often sung in modern productions by a countertenor voice, but has been sung in productions and recordings by both males and females, in registers from bass to soprano.

The ritornello for horn obbligato at the outset (bars 1 to 9) prefigures the melody sung by Caesar. The horn subsequently also echoes Caesar every time the word "cacciator" (hunter) is sung. As pointed out by Richard Taruskin, the use of a natural instrument such as the horn "sets ... narrow limits on the harmony, virtually confining it to ... the "primary" chords – tonic, dominant, subdominant", and this is reflected in the harmony and orchestration of the aria. The opening and closing sections are in F major; the central section (in which the horn is silent) is in D minor with a modulation to A minor.

The music is particularly appropriate to Caesar's situation, "having a curious, creeping effect ... carrying out exactly the idea of the words." Handel's original draft of the first act prepared the aria for a different character; with a slightly variant text, it was allocated to Cleopatra's cousin Berenice, who urged Cleopatra to stalk Caesar like a crafty hunter to make him enamoured of her. The character of Berenice was subsequently deleted from the libretto.

The horn, which was to feature prominently in 18th century compositions centred on dramatic themes of hunting or nobility, clearly symbolizes here the hunt, a recreation which was reserved for the wealthy and privileged. The virtuosic horn line (particularly difficult on the natural horn which did not have the valves available to the modern player) underlines this perspective. The aria has been cited as a very early example of the horn's use in opera; audiences at the time of Giulio Cesare's premiere would not have expected to hear the horn used as a solo instrument. (Note: Other early examples of the horn in opera include in Michelangelo Rossi's opera Erminio sul Giordana (1633), Francesco Cavalli's opera Le nozze di Teti e di Peleo (1639), Reinhard Keiser's opera Octavia (1705) and Alessandro Scarlatti's Tigrane (1715).) Handel began to feature the horn in his 1708 serenata Aci, Galatea e Polifemo, and first used the horn as part of an opera orchestra in Rinaldo (1711). The score of Giulio Cesare calls for four horns in the orchestra (although only one is used in this aria), and this would seem to be the first appearance in music of the 'horn quartet' which would become a standard feature of orchestral scores of the music of the romantic period a century later. The only other noted use by Handel of a horn obbligato in an aria occurs in his pastoral ode L'Allegro, il Penseroso ed il Moderato (1740), where the text, "Mirth, admit me", also refers to hunting.

Earlier versions of the thematic material of the aria can be traced in Handel's Acis and Galatea (1718) and in an early trio sonata. Many of Handel's Nine German Arias (HWV 202–210), which were written between 1724 and 1726, share features with his operas of the period, and in particular the aria "Die ihr aus dunkeln Grüften" (HWV 208) has a ritornello and pace very close to "Va tacito".

=== "Simile" aria ===
The aria has been cited as an example of a aria simile, because the words and the music both reflect, in metaphor, the situation of the character. Caesar, at Tolomeo's palace in Alexandria, compares himself to a stealthy hunter carefully tracking his prey; the prey in this case is Tolomeo, king of Egypt, who has just given Caesar a cool reception and whom Caesar views with suspicion. The aria follows a scene in which both Tolomeo and Caesar have complimented each other; Tolomeo has ordered his guards to escort the Roman visitor to the state apartments; but, in an aside to his general Curio, Caesar says he does not trust Tolomeo and expects to be betrayed.

== Interpretations ==
The aria was performed in 1784 at the Handel Commemoration Festival in Westminster Abbey. Present in the audience was the music historian Charles Burney, who wrote "The French-horn part, which is almost a perfect echo to the voice, has never been equalled in any Air, so accomplished, that I remember."

In the 2005 production of Giulio Cesare at Glyndebourne Festival Opera directed by David McVicar, the aria was choreographed with a "sinister court dance" underscoring the diplomatic manoeuvering and machination to which the text alludes.

== Recordings ==
In addition to appearing on recordings of Giulio Cesare, the aria also features on several recital albums, including:

- Georg Friedrich Händel: Heroic Arias. James Bowman, The King's Consort. Label: Hyperion
- David Daniels, Handel Operatic Arias. David Daniels, Orchestra of the Age of Enlightenment. Label: Veritas
- G. F. Haendel: Ombra mai fù: Airs, scènes célèbres et musique instrumentale. Andreas Scholl, Akademie für Alte Musik Berlin. Label: Harmonia Mundi
- Handel: Arias, Bryn Terfel. Scottish Chamber Orchestra. Label: Deutsche Grammophon

== Notes and references ==
Notes

Sources

- Blandford, W. F. H. (October 1939). "Handel's Horn and Trombone Parts". The Musical Times. 80 (1160): 697–699. doi:10.2307/921745. JSTOR 921745. Retrieved 1 November 2016. (subscription required)
- Burrows, Donald (2010). Handel. Oxford: Oxford University Press. ISBN 0-19-978008-0.
- Carter, Tim (2015). Understanding Italian Opera. Oxford: Oxford University Press. ISBN 0-19-024794-0.
- Crowder, C. Fairfax (April 1921). "Neglected Treasures in Handel's Operas". Music & Letters. 2 (2): 135–148. doi:10.1093/ml/2.2.135. JSTOR 726108. Retrieved 1 November 2016. (subscription required)
- Dean, Winton; Knapp, John Merrill (1987). Handel's Operas 1704–1726. Oxford: Clarendon Press. ISBN 0-19-315219-3.
- DelDonna, Anthony (2009). The Cambridge Companion to Eighteenth-Century Opera. Cambridge Companions to Music. Cambridge: Cambridge University Press. ISBN 1-139-82817-7.
- Gallo, Denise (2013). Opera: The Basics. London: Routledge. ISBN 1-136-08802-4.
- Handel, Georg Frideric (1875). Friedrich Chrysander (ed.). Georg Friedrich Händels Werke. Opern Band XIV. Giulio Cesare. Leipzig: Deutsche Händelgesellschaft – via IMSLP.
- Hicks, Anthony (2002). "Giulio Cesare in Egitto (ii)". Grove Music Online (8th ed.). Oxford University Press. doi:10.1093/gmo/9781561592630.article.O004424. ISBN 978-1-56159-263-0. (subscription, Wikilibrary access, or UK public library membership required)
- Kimbell, David (2016). Handel on the Stage. Cambridge: Cambridge University Press. ISBN 1-316-53116-3.
- Monelle, Raymond (2006). The Musical Topic: Hunt, Military and Pastoral. Bloomington and Indianapolis: Indiana University Press. ISBN 0-253-11236-2.
- Taruskin, Richard (2010). Music in the Seventeenth and Eighteenth Centuries. Oxford: Oxford University Press. ISBN 978-0-19-538482-6.
- Uhde, Folkert (1998). G. F. Haendel: Ombra mai fù: Airs, scènes célèbres et musique instrumentale (essay in CD booklet). Translated by Derek Yeld. Harmonia Mundi. HMC 901685.
- Vickers, David (2007). Händel: Neun Deutschen Arien (essay in CD booklet). Hyperion Records. CDA67627.
- Westrup, Jack (2001). "Simile aria". Grove Music Online (8th ed.). Oxford University Press. doi:10.1093/gmo/9781561592630.article.25810. ISBN 978-1-56159-263-0. (subscription, Wikilibrary access, or UK public library membership required)
