= Rodelinda (opera) =

1725 opera by Handel

George Frideric Handel

Rodelinda, regina de' Longobardi (HWV 19) is an opera seria in three acts composed for the first Royal Academy of Music by George Frideric Handel. The libretto is by Nicola Francesco Haym, based on an earlier libretto by Antonio Salvi. Rodelinda has long been regarded as one of Handel's greatest works.

== Performance history ==
Rodelinda was first performed at the King’s Theatre in the Haymarket, London, on 13 February 1725. It was produced with the same singers as Tamerlano. There were 14 performances; it was repeated on 18 December 1725, and again on 4 May 1731, a further 16 performances in all, each revival including changes and fresh material. In 1735 and 1736 it was also performed, with only modest success, in Hamburg at the Oper am Gänsemarkt.

The first modern production – in heavily altered form – was in Göttingen on 26 June 1920 where it was the first of a series of modern Handel opera revivals produced by the Handel enthusiast Oskar Hagen. The opera reached the US in 1931 and was revived in London in 1939. There was a further London performance in June 1959 by the Handel Opera Society, conducted by Charles Farncombe, with Joan Sutherland and Janet Baker singing a cut text in English.

With the revival of interest in Baroque music and historically informed musical performance since the 1960s, Rodelinda continues to be performed at festivals and opera houses. Among other performances, Rodelinda was staged at the Glyndebourne Festival in the UK in 1998, by the Metropolitan Opera in New York in 2004 and by English National Opera in 2014. The ENO production was revived at the Bolshoi Theatre in 2015. The Gran Teatre del Liceu, Barcelona, performed the opera in March 2019, with Lisette Oropesa and Bejun Mehta in the leading roles. The Dutch National Opera staged Rodelinda in January 2020, with Lucy Crowe and Bejun Mehta in the leading roles.

== Roles ==
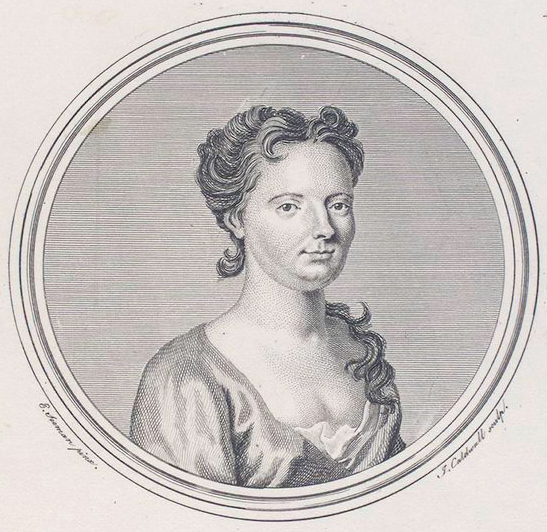
Francesca Cuzzoni who played the role of Rodelinda in the first performance

Roles, voice types, and premiere cast
Role	Voice type	Premiere cast, 13 February 1725
Rodelinda, Queen of Lombardy	soprano	Francesca Cuzzoni
Bertarido, usurped King of Lombardy	alto castrato	Francesco Bernardi, called "Senesino"
Grimoaldo, Duke of Benevento, Bertarido's usurper	tenor	Francesco Borosini
Eduige, Bertarido's sister, betrothed to Grimoaldo	contralto	Anna Vincenza Dotti
Unulfo, Bertarido's friend and counsellor	alto castrato	Andrea Pacini
Garibaldo, Grimoaldo's counsellor, duke of Turin	bass	Giuseppe Maria Boschi
Flavio, Rodelinda's son	silent	

== Synopsis ==
=== The argument ===
Prior to the opening of the opera, Grimoaldo has defeated Bertarido, King of Lombardy, in battle and has usurped the throne of Milan. Bertarido has fled, leaving his wife Rodelinda and his son Flavio prisoners of the usurper. Failing to secure support to recover his crown, Bertarido has caused it to be reported that he has died in exile, a ruse to be used in an attempt to rescue his wife and son.

=== Act 1 ===
==== Rodelinda's apartments ====
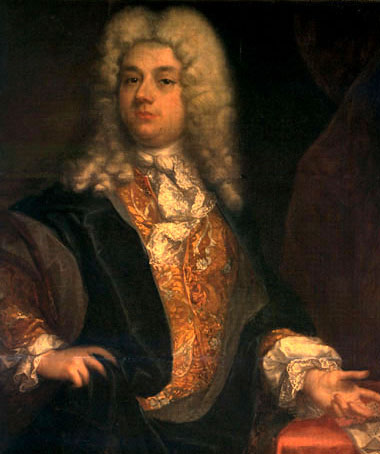
Senesino, who played the role of Bertarido in the first performance

Alone in the palace, Rodelinda mourns the loss of her husband Bertarido. The usurper Grimoaldo enters, declaring a long-hidden passion for her. He proposes marriage and offers her back the throne that is rightfully hers. She angrily rejects him (Aria: "L'empio rigor del fato"). Eduige arrives looking for Grimoaldo. Grimoaldo, having previously been betrothed to Bertarido's sister Eduige, now spurns her. After Grimoaldo leaves, the scheming Garibaldo, his counsellor, professes love for Eduige. She promises to return his love once she has had revenge on Grimoaldo (Aria: "Lo farò, diro: spietato"). Alone, Garibaldo reveals that his love for Eduige is feigned, and is part of a plan to gain the throne for himself (Aria: "Di cupido impiego i vanni").

==== A cypress-grove ====
Bertarido, in hiding nearby, reads the inscription on his own memorial and longs for his beloved wife Rodelinda (Aria: "Dove sei, amato bene?"). Along with his friend and counsellor Unulfo, he secretly watches as a weeping Rodelinda and Flavio, her son, lay flowers at his memorial. Garibaldo enters with an ultimatum for Rodelinda: either she agrees to marry Grimoaldo, or her son will be put to death. Rodelinda consents but also vows to demand Garibaldo's death when she returns to the throne. Bertarido, still watching, is aghast and takes Rodelinda's decision as an act of betrayal.

=== Act 2 ===
==== A great hall ====
Garibaldo taunts Eduige, telling her that she has missed her chance to become queen. Eduige satirically congratulates Rodelinda, noting her sudden decision to betray her husband's memory and marry his usurper. Eduige vows vengeance on Grimoaldo. Eduige departs and Grimoaldo enters. Rodelinda sets out her terms for marrying Grimoaldo: he must in her sight kill Flavio with his own hands. Grimoaldo, horrified, refuses. After Rodelinda leaves, Garibaldo encourages Grimoaldo to carry out the murder, but he again refuses. He says that Rodelinda's act of courage and determination has made him love her all the more, though he has now lost hope of winning her. When the two advisors are alone, Unulfo asks Garibaldo how he could give a king such advice, and Garibaldo expounds his tyrannical perspective on the use of power (Aria: "Tirannia gliel diede il regno").

==== A delightful prospect ====
Bertarido approaches the palace grounds in disguise; his sister Eduige recognizes his voice. Unulfo brings word of Rodelinda's fidelity, and Eduige agrees to help Bertarido rescue his wife and son. Unulfo promises to pass a message to Rodelinda that her husband is still alive. Bertarido rejoices.

==== A gallery in Rodelinda's apartment ====
Rodelinda and Bertarido meet in secret, and are discovered in an embrace by Grimoaldo who fails to recognise her husband. Grimoaldo is outraged, believing that Rodelinda has taken a lover. To save her honour, Bertarido reveals his identity but Grimoaldo vows to kill him anyway, whoever he may be. The spouses bid each other a last farewell (Duet: "Io t'abbraccio").

=== Act 3 ===
==== A gallery ====
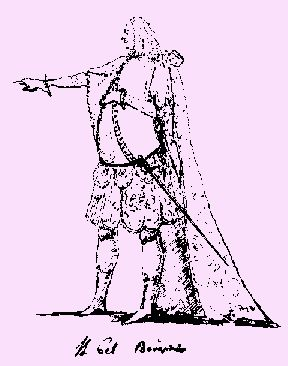
Caricature of Francesco Borosini, who played the role of Grimoaldo in the first performance

Unulfo and Eduige plan to release Bertarido from prison: they will smuggle to him a sword and the key to a secret passage. Garibaldo advises Grimoaldo to put the unknown man – whether Bertarido or not – to death. Grimoaldo is racked by jealousy, passion and fear.

==== A very dark prison ====
Languishing in prison, Bertarido receives the sword, the key, and a written note. When Unulfo comes to release him, Bertarido mistakes the visitor in the darkness for the executioner and wounds him with the sword. Unulfo shrugs the injury off, and the two leave. Eduige guides Rodelinda into the cell. Finding it empty, and seeing blood on the floor, they fear that Bertarido is dead.

==== A royal garden ====
Grimoaldo is tormented by remorse and flees to the palace garden, hoping to find a peaceful spot where he can seek solace in sleep (Aria: "Pastorello d'un povero armento"). Garibaldo, finding him unprotected, decides to kill him. Bertarido appears and kills the intended assassin, though sparing Grimoaldo (Aria: "Vivi, tiranno!"). Grimoaldo renounces his claim to the throne of Milan, and pledges himself once again to Eduige. He offers the throne back to Bertarido who accepts it once he is assured that his wife and son will be returned to him. There is general rejoicing.

== Sources ==
The opera's libretto is by Nicola Francesco Haym, and was based on an earlier libretto by Antonio Salvi that had been set by Giacomo Antonio Perti in 1710. Salvi's libretto was derived from Pierre Corneille's tragedy Pertharite, roi des Lombards (1652), which dealt with the history of Perctarit, king of the Lombards. The ultimate origin of the story, as of Handel's Flavio, is Paul the Deacon's eighth-century work Gesta Langobardorum. In the opera, 'Pertharite' becomes 'Bertarido'.

== Context and analysis ==
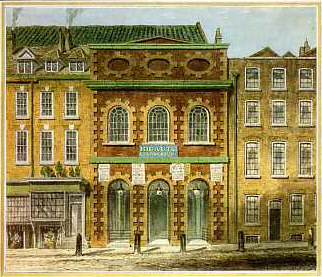
The King's Theatre, London, where Rodelinda had its first performance

The German-born Handel, after spending some of his early career composing operas and other pieces in Italy, settled in London, where in 1711 he had brought Italian opera for the first time with his opera Rinaldo. A tremendous success, Rinaldo created a craze in London for Italian opera seria, a form focused overwhelmingly on solo arias for the star virtuoso singers. In 1719, Handel was appointed music director of an organisation called the Royal Academy of Music (unconnected with the present-day London conservatoire), a company under royal charter to produce Italian operas in London. Handel was not only to compose operas for the company but hire the star singers, supervise the orchestra and musicians, and adapt operas from Italy for London performance.

Within a year, 1724–1725, Handel wrote three great operas in succession for the Royal Academy of Music, each with Senesino and Francesca Cuzzoni as the stars, the other two being Giulio Cesare and Tamerlano.

Horace Walpole wrote of Cuzzoni in Rodelinda:

She was short and squat, with a doughy cross face, but fine complexion; was not a good actress; dressed ill; and was silly and fantastical. And yet on her appearing in this opera, in a brown silk gown trimmed with silver, with the vulgarity and indecorum of which all the old ladies were much scandalised, the young adopted it as a fashion, so universally, that it seemed a national uniform for youth and beauty.

To 18th century musicologist Charles Burney, Rodelinda "contains such a number of capital and pleasing airs, as entitles it to one of the first places among Handel's dramatic productions". Burney notes particularly the aria for Bertarido in act 1, "Dove sei, amato bene", calling it "one of the finest pathetic airs that can be found in all his works... This air is rendered affecting by new and curious modulation, as well as by the general cast of the melody." This aria is also sometimes sung as a solo piece in English, to an unrelated text – "Art thou troubled?" – by W. G. Rothery, written in 1910.

== Instrumentation ==
The opera is scored for two recorders, flute, two oboes, bassoon, two horns, strings and continuo (cello, lute, harpsichord).

== Recordings ==
=== Audio recordings ===
Rodelinda discography, audio recordings
Year	Cast: Rodelinda, Bertarido, Grimoaldo, Eduige, Unulfo, Garibaldo	Conductor, orchestra	Label
1959, live in London	Joan Sutherland, Margreta Elkins, Alfred Hallett, Janet Baker, Patricia Kern, Raimund Herincx	Charles Farncombe, Philomusica Orchestra	CD:Andromeda; Cat:ANDRCD9075
1964, studio recording	Teresa Stich-Randall, Maureen Forrester, Alexander Young, Hilde Rössel-Majdan, Helen Watts, John Boyden	Brian Priestman, Vienna Radio Orchestra	CD:The Westminster Legacy; Cat:DG 4792343
1985, April 25-30 and May 3-4, studio recording at St Barnabas’ Church, North Finchley, London	Joan Sutherland, Alicia Nafé, Curtis Rayam, Isobel Buchanan, Huguette Tourangeau, Samuel Ramey	Richard Bonynge; Welsh National Opera Orchestra	CD:Decca (originally); later Australian Eloquence; Cat: ELQ4806105
1990, June 3-4, live in Frankfurt	Barbara Schlick, David Cordier, Christoph Prégardien, Claudia Schubert, Kai Wessel, Gotthold Schwarz	Michael Schneider; La Stagione Frankfurt	CD:Deutsche Harmonia Mundi; Cat: 05472-77182-2
1996	Sophie Daneman, Daniel Taylor, Adrian Thompson, Catherine Robbin, Robin Blaze, Christopher Purves	Nicholas Kraemer; Raglan Baroque Players	CD:Virgin Classics Veritas; Cat: 45277
2004, studio recording	Simone Kermes, Marijana Mijanović, Steve Davislim, Sonia Prina, Marie-Nicole Lemieux, Vito Priante	Alan Curtis; Il Complesso Barocco	CD:DG Archiv; Cat:4775391
2013, live in Martina Franca	Sonia Ganassi, Franco Fagioli, Paolo Fanale, Marina De Liso, Antonio Giovannini, Gezim Myshketa	Diego Fasolis; Orchestra Internazionale d'Italia	CD:Dynamic; Cat:CDS7724
2021, Sept. 16-21, studio recording at the Church of St John the Evangelist, Smith Square, London	Lucy Crowe, Iestyn Davies, Joshua Ellicott, Brandon Cedel, Jess Dandy, Tim Mead	Harry Bicket; The English Concert	CD:Linn Records; Cat:CKD658

=== Video recordings ===
Rodelinda discography, video recordings
Year	Cast: Rodelinda, Bertarido, Grimoaldo, Eduige, Unulfo, Garibaldo	Conductor, orchestra	Stage director	Label
1998, Glyndebourne	Anna Caterina Antonacci, Andreas Scholl, Kurt Streit, Louise Winter, Artur Stefanowicz. Umberto Chiummo	William Christie; Orchestra of the Age of Enlightenment	Jean-Marie Villégier	DVD:Warner Classics; Cat:3984230242
2003, Munich	Dorothea Röschmann, Michael Chance, Paul Nilon, Felicity Palmer, Christopher Robson, Umberto Chiummo	Ivor Bolton; Bavarian State Opera Orchestra	David Alden	DVD:Farao; Cat:D108060
2011, Dec. 3, New York	Renée Fleming, Andreas Scholl, Joseph Kaiser, Stephanie Blythe, Iestyn Davies, Shenyang	Harry Bicket; Metropolitan Opera Orchestra	Stephen Wadsworth	DVD:Decca; Cat:0743469
2018, Oct. 11, Lille	Jeanine de Bique, Tim Mead, Benjamin Hulett, Avery Amereau, Jakub Józef Orliński, Andrea Mastroni	Emmanuelle Haïm, Le Concert d'Astrée	Jean Bellorini	DVD:Erato Records; Cat:9029541988
