= Svegliatevi nel core =

Aria by George Frideric Handel

Portrait of George Frideric Handel by Balthasar Denner, c. 1726–28

"Svegliatevi nel core" ("Awaken in my heart") is an aria taken from act 1, scene 4 of the Italian language opera seria, Giulio Cesare, by George Frideric Handel. The aria is written for the role of Sesto, a soprano in trouser role, including during the premiere, who sings it to assure his mother that he will avenge the death of his father, Pompey, who was assassinated by the Egyptians, instructed by Tolomeo (Ptolemy XIII Theos Philopator) to demonstrate the Egyptians' loyalty to Julius Caesar. The words were written by Nicola Francesco Haym.

Today, the role is also often sung by countertenor.

== Libretto ==
Recitative
Vani sono i lamenti
è tempo, o Sesto, ormai
di vendicar il padre
si svegli alla vendetta
l'anima neghittosa
che offesa da un tiranno invan riposa.

Aria
Svegliatevi nel core
furie d'un'alma offesa
a far d'un traditor
aspra vendetta!

L'ombra del genitore
accorre a mia difesa
e dice: a te il rigor
Figlio si aspetta.

Awaken in my heart
The wrath of an offended soul
So I may wreak upon a traitor
My bitter vengeance!

The ghost of my father
Hastens to my defense
Saying: From you, my son
Ferocity is expected.
