= Giulio Cesare =

1724 opera by George Frideric Handel

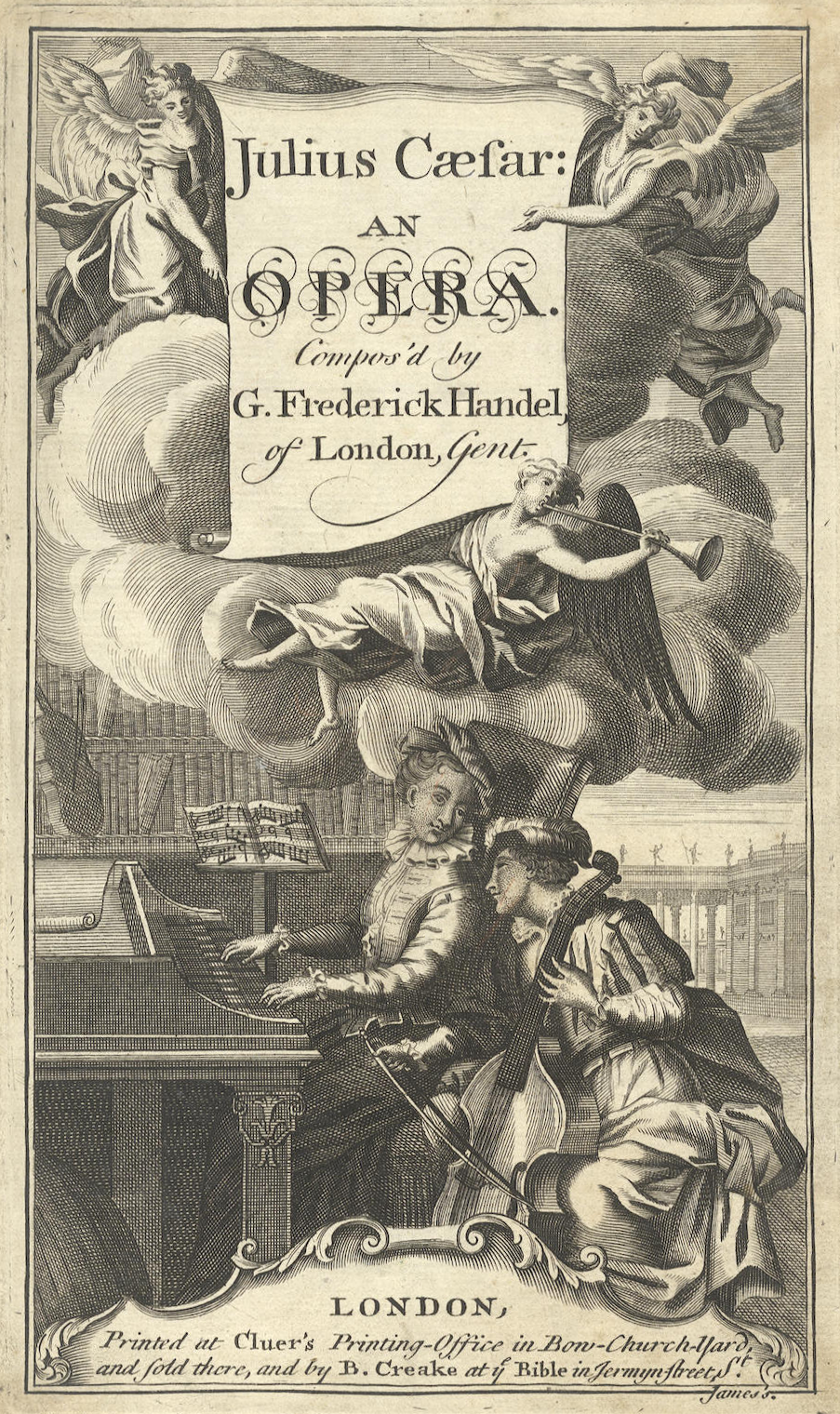
First edition of July 1724 printed by Cluer and Creake

Giulio Cesare in Egitto (Italian: [ˈdʒuːljo ˈtʃeːzare in eˈdʒitto, - ˈtʃɛː-]; lit. 'Julius Caesar in Egypt'; HWV 17), commonly known as Giulio Cesare, is a dramma per musica (opera seria) in three acts composed by George Frideric Handel for the Royal Academy of Music in 1724. The libretto was written by Nicola Francesco Haym who used an earlier libretto by Giacomo Francesco Bussani, which had been set to music by Antonio Sartorio (1676). The opera was a success at its first performances, was frequently revived by Handel in his subsequent opera seasons and is now one of the most often performed Baroque operas.

The opera's plot is loosely based on historical events during the Roman Civil War of 49–45 BC.

== Composition history ==
George Frideric Handel

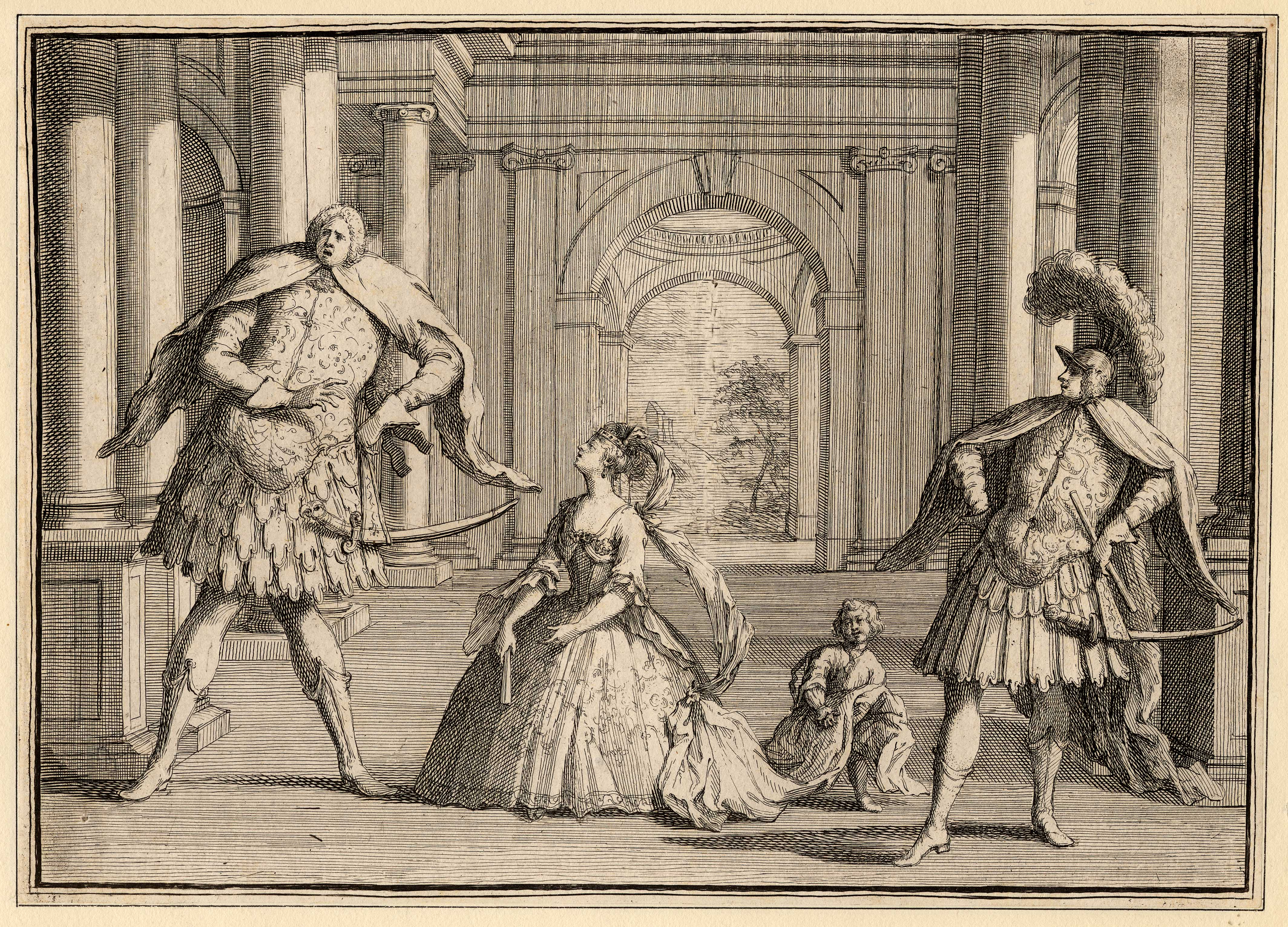
Senesino, Cuzzoni and Berenstadt, probably in a scene from Flavio

Giulio Cesare in Egitto was first performed at the King's Theatre in the Haymarket, London on 20 February 1724. The opera was an immediate success. A contemporary wrote in a letter on 10 March 1724:

...the opera is in full swing also, since Hendell's new one, called Jules César – in which Cenesino and Cozzuna shine beyond all criticism – has been put on. The house was just as full at the seventh performance as at the first.

Handel revived the opera (with various changes) three times during his lifetime: in 1725, 1730, and 1732.

The roles of Cesare and Cleopatra were originally sung by the castrato Senesino and the famous soprano Francesca Cuzzoni respectively. Handel composed eight arias and two recitatives accompagnati for each singer, thus making full use of their vocal capabilities. Curio and Nireno were not allotted any arias in the original version, only singing in recitatives, although they take part in the first and final choruses. However, Handel composed an aria for Nireno for a later revival in 1730.

Although a caricature, the contemporary engraving of Senesino on the left, Francesca Cuzzoni and castrato Gaetano Berenstadt on the right, provides valuable information about the visual aspect of the original performances of Handel operas. The illustration is probably of a scene from Handel's Flavio, presented by the Royal Academy of Music in 1723, although it has sometimes been identified as a scene from Giulio Cesare. The elongated bodies of the castrati tower over Cuzzoni, who was described by Horace Walpole as "short and squat". The set is architectural and generic, not a specific locale, and the costumes for the men are also generic, with some inspiration from ancient Roman military attire; breastplates, armoured skirts and leg armour, combined with plumes on the headdresses. Such costumes were worn by the leading men in Handel operas whether the setting was ancient Rome or Gothic Europe. Cuzzoni, in contrast, wears a contemporary gown such as might have been suitable for presentation at court, with a dwarf to serve as her train-bearer.

== Roles ==
Roles, voice types, and premiere cast
Role	Voice type	First performance, 20 February 1724
Giulio Cesare (Julius Caesar)	alto castrato	Francesco Bernardi ("Senesino")
Cleopatra, Queen of Egypt	soprano	Francesca Cuzzoni
Tolomeo, her brother, King of Egypt	alto castrato	Gaetano Berenstadt
Cornelia, widow of Pompey	contralto	Anastasia Robinson
Sesto, her stepson	soprano (en travesti)	Margherita Durastanti
Achilla, Tolomeo's General	bass	Giuseppe Maria Boschi
Curio, a praetor, Caesar's General	bass	John Lagarde
Nireno, Cleopatra's and Tolomeo's servant	alto castrato	Giuseppe Bigonzi

For the first performances in 1724 Giulio Cesare was scored for 4 horns, 2 oboes, 2 alto recorders, 2 bassoons, transverse flute, first, second and third violins, violas, cello, viola da gamba, harp, theorbo and basso continuo.

== Synopsis ==
Place: Egypt
Time: 48–47 B.C.

As with most of his other operas, Handel made several revisions to the score of Giulio Cesare for revivals, adding new arias and cutting others. The listing of arias in this synopsis applies to the original 1724 version.

=== Abridged plot ===
Cesare, in pursuit of his enemy Pompeo, follows him to Egypt. Pompeo's wife Cornelia pleads with Cesare to spare her husband. He is about to grant her plea, when the Egyptians led by their boy king Tolomeo bring him the head of Pompeo. Cornelia and Pompeo's son Sesto vow to avenge his death. Tolomeo's sister Cleopatra desires to depose her brother in order to become the sole ruler of Egypt. She joins Cornelia and Sesto in their plans for vengeance and entreats Cesare to aid her. Following her overtures, Cesare falls in love with Cleopatra. Her brother attempts to assassinate Cesare, but he escapes. It is reported to Cleopatra that Cesare has drowned while in flight. She is taken captive by her brother. Cesare, who has escaped drowning, enters to free his beloved. Tolomeo is slain by Sesto, because he forced himself upon Cornelia against her will. Cesare makes Cleopatra Queen of Egypt and returns to Rome.

=== Act 1 ===
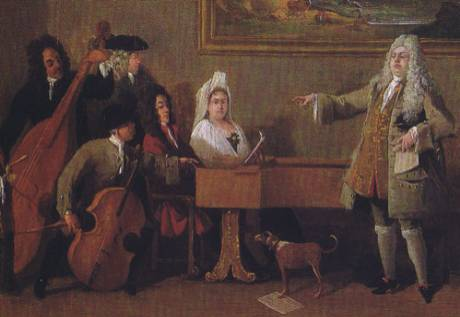
The librettist Nicola Francesco Haym seated at the harpsichord, Marco Ricci, c 1709

After the overture, the entire cast, except Giulio Cesare, gathers on stage for the opening chorus, a victory song which compares Cesare to Hercules. (Chorus: Viva, viva il nostro Alcide). Giulio Cesare and his victorious troops arrive on the banks of the River Nile after defeating Pompeo's forces. (Aria: Presti omai l'Egizia terra). Pompeo's second wife, Cornelia, begs for mercy for her husband's life. Cesare agrees, but on the condition that Pompeo must see him in person. Achilla, the leader of the Egyptian army, presents Cesare with a casket containing Pompeo's head. It is a token of support from Tolomeo, the co-ruler of Egypt (together with Cleopatra, his sister). Cornelia faints, and Cesare is furious about Tolomeo's cruelty. (Aria: Empio, dirò, tu sei). Cesare's assistant, Curio, offers to avenge Cornelia, hoping that she will fall for him and marry him. Cornelia rejects the offer in grief, saying that another death would not relieve her pain. (Aria: Priva, son d'ogni conforto). Sesto, son of Cornelia and Pompeo, swears to take revenge for his father's death. (Aria: Svegliatevi nel core). Cleopatra decides to use her charm to seduce Cesare. (Aria: Non disperar, chi sà?) Achilla brings the news to Tolomeo that Cesare was furious over the murder of Pompeo. Tolomeo swears to kill Cesare to protect his rule of the kingdom. (Aria: L'empio, sleale, indegno). Cleopatra (in disguise) goes to meet Cesare in his camp hoping that he will support her as the queen of Egypt. Cesare is amazed by her beauty. (Aria: Non è si vago e bello). Nireno notes that the seduction was successful. (Aria: Tutto può donna vezzosa). Meanwhile, Cornelia continues to mourn the loss of her husband. (Arioso: Nel tuo seno, amico sasso). Cornelia prepares to kill Tolomeo to avenge Pompeo's death, but is stopped by Sesto, who promises to do it instead. Cesare, Cornelia and Sesto go to the Egyptian palace to meet Tolomeo. (Aria: Cara speme, questo core). Cleopatra now believes that as she has turned Cesare, Cornelia and Sesto against Tolomeo successfully, the scales are tipped in her favour. (Aria: Tu la mia stella sei). Cesare meets Tolomeo, who offers him a room in the royal apartments, though Cesare tells Curio that he expects Tolomeo to betray him. (Aria: Va tacito e nascosto). Tolomeo is fascinated by Cornelia's beauty but has promised Achilla that he could have her. (Aria: Tu sei il cor di questo core). Sesto attempts to challenge Tolomeo, but is unsuccessful. When Cornelia rejects Achilla, he orders the soldiers to arrest Sesto. (Duet: Son nata a lagrimar).

=== Act 2 ===
In Cleopatra's palace, while in disguise as "Lidia", she uses her charms to seduce Cesare. (Aria: V'adoro, pupille). She sings praises of Cupid's darts and Cesare is delighted. Cesare is smitten with Cleopatra, and Nireno tells Cesare that "Lidia" is waiting for him. (Aria: Se in fiorito ameno prato). In Tolomeo's palace, Cornelia laments her fate. (Arioso: Deh piangete, oh mesti lumi). Achilla pleads with Cornelia to accept him, but she rejects him. (Aria: Se a me non sei crudele) When he leaves, Tolomeo also tries to win her, but is also rejected. (Aria: Sì spietata, il tuo rigore). Thinking that there is no hope, Cornelia tries to take her own life, but is stopped by Sesto, who is escorted by Nireno. Nireno reveals the bad news that Tolomeo has given orders for Cornelia to be sent to his harem. However, Nireno also comes up with a plan to sneak Sesto into the harem together with Cornelia, so Sesto can kill Tolomeo when he is alone and unarmed. (Aria: Cessa omai di sospirare). Sesto enters the garden of the palace, wishing to fight Tolomeo for killing his father. (Aria: L'angue offeso mai riposa). Meanwhile, Cleopatra waits for Cesare to arrive in her palace. (Aria: Venere bella). Still smitten with her, Cesare arrives in Cleopatra's palace. However, Curio suddenly bursts in and warns Cesare that he has been betrayed, and enemies are approaching Cesare's chambers and chanting "Death to Cesare". Cleopatra reveals her identity and after hearing the enemies heading for them, asks Cesare to flee, but he decides to fight. (Aria: Al lampo dell'armi). (Chorus: Morà, Cesare morà). Cleopatra, having fallen in love with Cesare, begs the gods to bless him. (Aria: Se pietà di me non senti). In Tolomeo's palace, Tolomeo prepares to enter his harem. (Arioso: Belle dee di questo core). As Tolomeo tries to seduce Cornelia, Sesto rushes in to kill Tolomeo, but is stopped by Achilla. Achilla announces that Cesare (in the attempt to run from soldiers) has jumped from the palace window and died. Achilla asks again for Cornelia's hand in marriage but is turned down by Tolomeo. Furious, Achilla leaves. Sesto feels devastated and attempts to kill himself but is prevented from doing so by his mother; he repeats his vow to kill Tolomeo. (Aria: L'aure che spira).

=== Act 3 ===
Furious at Tolomeo for being ungrateful to him despite his loyalty, Achilla plans to defect to Cleopatra's side (Aria: Dal fulgor di questa spada), but Tolomeo stabs him before he does. As battle rings out between Tolomeo's and Cleopatra's armies, Tolomeo celebrates his apparent victory against Cleopatra (Aria: Domerò la tua fierezza). Cleopatra laments losing both the battle and Cesare (Aria: Piangerò la sorte mia). However, Cesare is not dead: he survived his leap and is roaming the desert in search of his troops (Aria: Aure, deh, per pietà). While looking for Tolomeo, Sesto finds the wounded, nearly dead Achilla, who hands Sesto a seal authorizing him to command his armies. Cesare appears and demands the seal, promising that he will either save both Cornelia and Cleopatra or die (Aria: Quel torrente, che cade dal monte). With Cesare alive and Achilla dead, Sesto's spirits lift, and he vows to fight on (Aria: La giustizia ha già sull'arco). Cesare continues on to Cleopatra's camp, where a lamenting Cleopatra is overjoyed to see him. (Aria: Da tempeste il legno infranto).

In the palace, Sesto finds Tolomeo trying to rape Cornelia and kills him. Having successfully avenged Pompeo, Cornelia and Sesto celebrate Tolomeo's death. (Aria: Non ha più che temere). The victorious Cesare and Cleopatra enter Alexandria, and Cesare proclaims Cleopatra to be queen of Egypt and promises his support to her and her country. They declare their love for each other (Duet: Caro! Bella! Più amabile beltà). Cesare then proclaims Egypt's liberation from tyranny, and wishes for the glory of Rome to spread far and wide. For the final chorus, the entire cast (including the dead Achilla and Tolomeo) gathers on stage to celebrate the power of love and the triumph of good over evil (Chorus: Ritorni omai nel nostro core).

== Musical description ==
=== Structure ===
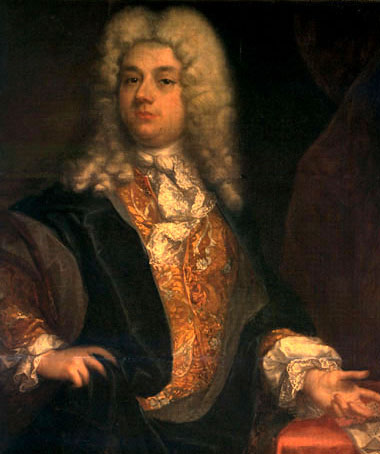
Senesino, who created the role of Giulio Cesare

The listing of musical numbers follows the nineteenth century edition of Friedrich Chrysander.

- Overture

==== Scene 1 ====
- 1. Coro – Viva il nostro Alcide
- 2. Aria (Cesare) – Presti omai l'egizia terra

==== Scene 3 ====
- 3. Aria (Cesare) – Empio, dirò, tu sei, togliti

==== Scene 4 ====
- 4. Aria (Cornelia) – Priva son d'ogni conforto, e pur speme
- 5. Aria (Sesto) – Svegliatevi nel core, furie d'un alma offesa

==== Scene 5 ====
- 6. Aria (Cleopatra) – Non disperar; chi sa? se al regno

==== Scene 6 ====
- 7. Aria (Tolomeo) – L'empio, sleale, indegno

==== Scene 7 ====
- 8. Recitativo accompagnato (Cesare) – Alma del gran Pompeo
- 9. Aria (Cesare) – Non è sì vago e bello il fior nel prato
- 10. Aria (Cleopatra) – Tutto può donna vezzosa

==== Scene 8, Part 1 ====
- 11. Arioso (Cornelia) – Nel tuo seno, amico sasso
- 12. Aria (Sesto) – Cara speme, questo core tu cominci a lusingar
- 13. Aria (Cleopatra) – Tu la mia stella sei

==== Scene 9 ====
- 14. Aria (Cesare) – Va tacito e nascosto - with obbligato Corno

==== Scene 11 ====
- 15. Aria (Achilla) – Tu sei il cor di questo core
- 16. Duetto (Cornelia, Sesto) – Son nata a lagrimar

==== Act 2 ====
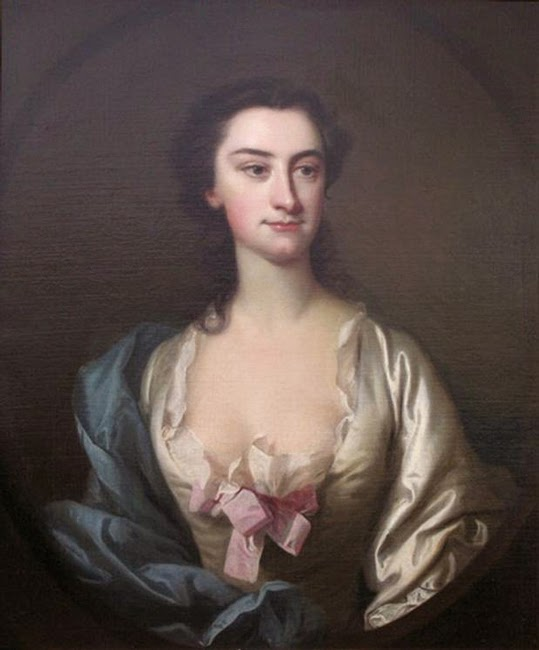
Francesca Cuzzoni, who created the role of Cleopatra

==== Scene 2 ====
- 17. Sinfonia e recitativo (Cesare, Nireno) – Taci / Cieli
- 18. Sinfonia e recitativo (Cesare) – Giulio, che miri
- 19. Aria (Cleopatra) – V'adoro pupille
- 20. Aria (Cesare) – Se in fiorito ameno prato

==== Scene 3 ====
- 21. Arioso (Cornelia) – Deh piangete, oh mesti lumi

==== Scene 4 ====
- 22. Aria (Achilla) – Se a me non sei crudele
- 23. Aria (Tolomeo) – Sì spietata, il tuo rigore sveglia

==== Scene 6 ====
- 24. Aria (Cornelia) – Cessa omai di sospirare!
- 25. Aria (Sesto) – L'angue offeso mai riposa

==== Scene 7 ====
- 26. Aria (Cleopatra) – Venere bella, per un instante

==== Scene 8 ====
- 27. Aria e Coro (Cesare) – Al lampo dell'armi / Morrà, Cesare, morrà
- 28. Recitativo accompagnato (Cleopatra) – Che sento? Oh Dio!
- 29. Aria (Cleopatra) – Se pietà di me non senti

==== Scene 9 ====
- 30. Arioso (Tolomeo) – Belle dee di questo core

==== Scene 11 ====
- 31. Aria (Sesto) – L'aure che spira tiranno e fiero

==== Act 3 ====
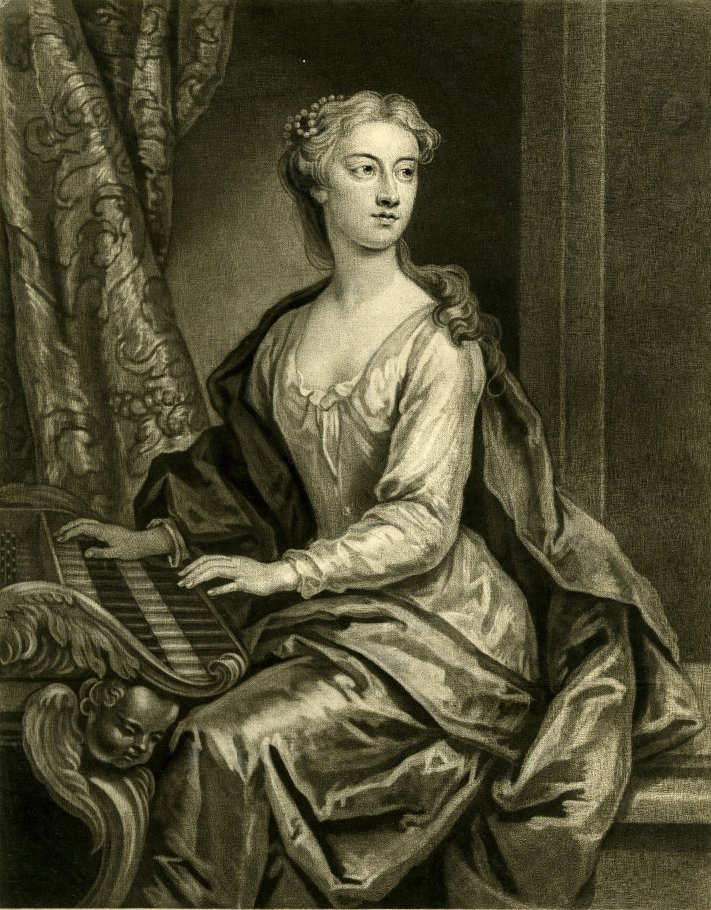
Anastasia Robinson, Countess of Peterborough, who created the role of Cornelia shortly before her retirement, British Museum

==== Scene 1 ====
- 32. Aria (Achilla) – Dal fulgor di questa spada

==== Scene 2 ====
- 33. Sinfonia
- 34. Aria (Tolomeo) – Domerò la tua fierezza

==== Scene 3 ====
- 35. Aria (Cleopatra) – Piangerò la sorte mia

==== Scene 4 ====
- 36. Recitativo accompagnato e Aria (Cesare) – Dall'ondoso periglio / Aure, deh, per pietà spirate

==== Scene 5 ====
- 37. Aria (Cesare) – Quel torrente, che cade dal monte

==== Scene 6 ====
- 38. Aria (Sesto) – La giustizia ha già sull'arco

==== Scene 7 ====
- 39. Recitativo accompagnato (Cleopatra) – Voi, che mie fide ancelle
- 40. Aria (Cleopatra) – Da tempeste il legno infranto

==== Scene 9 ====
- 41. Aria (Cornelia) – Non ha più che temere quest'alma

==== Scene 10 ====
- 42. Sinfonia / La Marche
- 43. Duetto (Cleopatra, Cesare) – Caro! – Bella! – Più amabile beltà
- 44. Coro – Ritorni omai nel nostro core
- 45. Aria (Nireno) - Chi Perde un Momento. (act 2 appendix)

=== Characterisation of roles ===
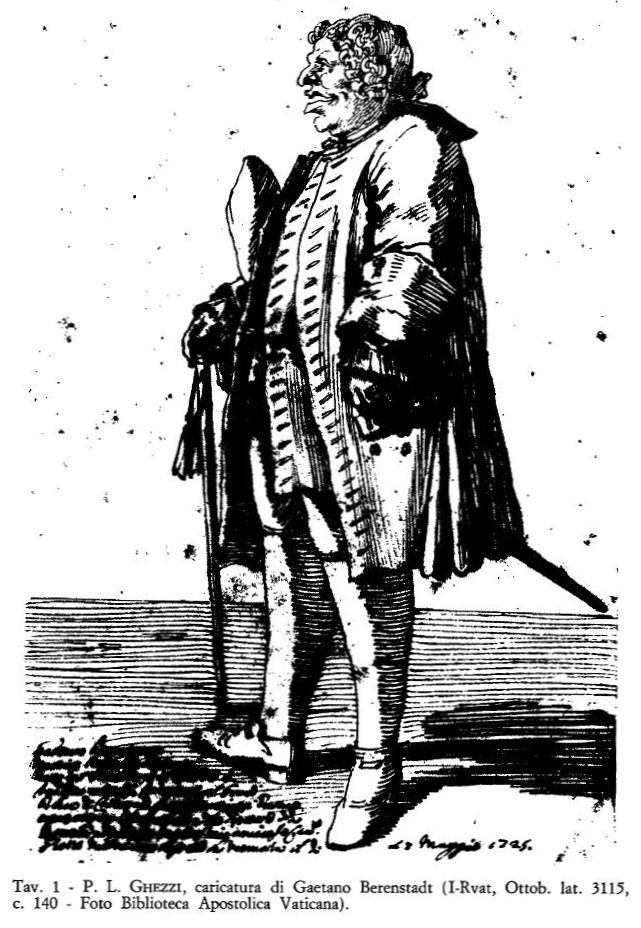
Caricature of Gaetano Berenstadt, who created the role of Tolomeo

The roles of Cesare and Cleopatra, sung by the castrato Senesino and famous soprano Francesca Cuzzoni respectively, and which encompass eight arias and two recitatives accompagnati each, make full use of the vocal capabilities of the singers. Cornelia and Sesto are more static characters because they are completely taken by their primary emotions, she with pain because of her husband's death and constantly constrained to defend herself from the advances of Achilla and Tolomeo, and he consumed by vengeance for his father's death.

Cleopatra, on the other hand, is a multifaceted character: she uses at first her womanly wiles to seduce Cesare and gain the throne of Egypt, and then becomes totally engaged in the love affair with Cesare. She has great arias of immense dramatic intensity Se pietà di me non senti (II, 8) and Piangerò la sorte mia (III, 3). Her sensual character is described magnificently in the aria V'adoro, pupille, in which Cleopatra, in the guise of Lidia, appears to Cesare surrounded by the Muses of Parnassus (II, 2). This number calls for two orchestras: one is a small group to play behind the scene with strings with sordino, oboe, tiorba, harp, bassoons and viola da gamba concertante.

Curio and Nireno do not get any arias in the original version, only singing recitatives, though they take part in the first and final choruses. However, Handel composed an aria for Nireno for a later revival in 1730.

=== Instrumentation ===
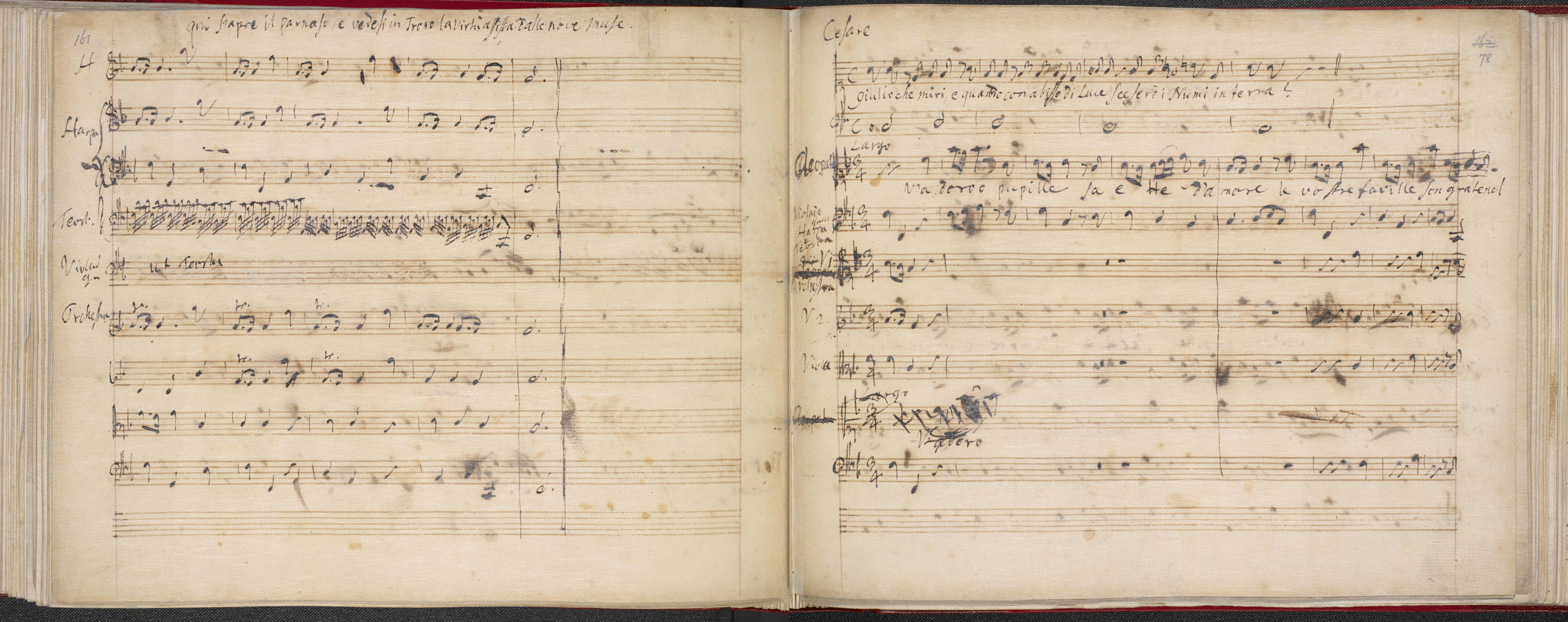
End of sinfonia and beginning of Cleopatra's aria "V'adoro, pupille", act 2, scene 2, autograph manuscript, 1723, British Library

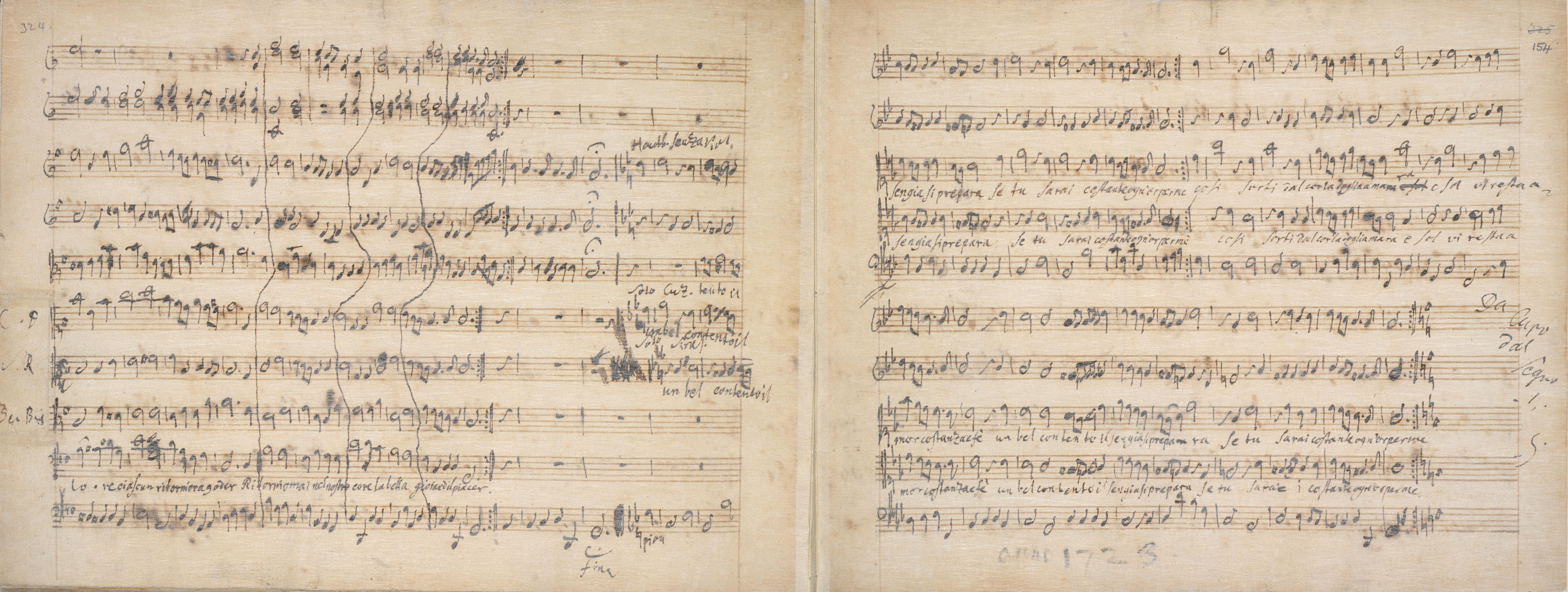
Part of final chorus and duet in minor key for Cesare and Cleopatra, act 3, autograph manuscript

The opera is scored for transverse flute, two alto recorders, two oboes, two bassoons, four horns, viola da gamba, harp, theorbo, strings and continuo. The basic orchestra consists of oboes, strings and continuo. The horns, divided into four parts, are used in the opening and closing choruses. Other obbligato instruments are used to add orchestral colour to individual arias: a hunting horn for Cesare's aria "Va tacito"; divided alto recorders for the central largo section of Sesto's "Svegliativi nel core"; solo concertato violin and divided bassoons in Cesare's aria "Se in fierto"; alto recorders in unison for Cornelia's aria "Cesa omai"; a solo violin for Cleopatra's aria "Venere bella"; sustained bassoons in unison for Cleopatra's aria "Se pieta"; transverse flute, first violins and obbligato cello for Cleopatra's aria "Piangero"; divided strings for Cesare's arioso-aria "Aure de per pieta". The final chorus for full orchestra with divided horns has a central interlude in the minor key with a duet for Cesare and Cleopatra accompanied only by oboes and continuo. It is preceded by another duet for Cesare and Cleopatra and an orchestral march with obbligato trumpet (not in the autograph manuscript and not always performed).

The most elaborate and ravishing orchestration occurs at the beginning of act 2 in Cleopatra's aria "V'adoro, pupille" sung in the guise of Lidia to seduce Cesare. On stage there is a tableau of the Temple of Virtue, below Mount Parnassus with a second orchestra or "symphony" of nine instruments played by the muses, with muted strings in the pit. The celestial instruments—oboes, bassoons, viola da gamba, harp, theorbo and strings—are first heard off-stage in a sinfonia behind the scene in what Cesare takes to be the "music of the spheres", before the tableau is revealed on-stage as the music burgeons, with rich arpeggios in the harp, double stopping on the viola da gamba and strumming on the theorbo.

== Performance history and reception ==
=== Eighteenth century ===
==== England ====
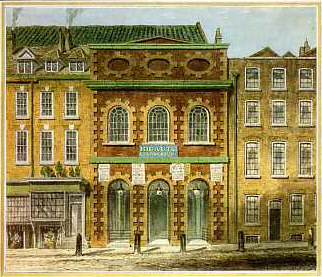
The King's Theatre, London, where Giulio Cesare had its first performance

For Handel's previous London operas, the scores and selected arias had been made available to the public by the printer and publisher John Walsh. These had proven to be popular and were an extra source of income. Even when printed copies of Handel's works were unavailable, Handel—through the offices of his assistant Christopher Smith on Dean Street—would authorise copies to be made in answer to requests from musical societies that wished to mount performances. In the case of Giulio Cesare, following the positive public response to the performances, Handel decided to use the printers Cluer and Creake in order to produce pocket-sized vocal scores and songbooks in high quality copper engravings, a time-consuming process. Cluer and Creake produced a first official edition of the vocal score in July 1724. In May 1724, however, an unauthorised edition had appeared printed by Daniel Wright, advertised as being available in "Musick Shops": Wright, probably acting on behalf of Walsh, had printed the score using a quicker but inferior stamping process on pewter: as a softer metal than copper, pewter could be stamped without raising its temperature.

Later in 1724, several arias or "favourite songs" from the opera were included in the second of two pocket songbooks, "A Pocket Companion for Gentlemen and Ladies", printed by Cluer and Creake and edited by Richard Neale. The texts were provided in Italian mostly with English translations by Carey, so that the arias could be sung, played on the harpsichord or, in a transposed version, on the transverse flute. The arias included were: Non e si bello e vago ("With thee is ev'ry pleasure beyond expressing");Non ha piu che temere ("My life my only treasure"); Cara speme ("Cruel creature"); Spera ne ingannai; La speranza all alma mia ("Hopes beguiling, pleasures smiling"); Chi perde un momento ("While Celia is flying"); Venere bella ("Gazing on my idol"); Se pieta di me non senti ("Welcome death, oh end my sorrow"); V'adoro pupille ("Lamenting, complaining"); and Non disperar ("Oh what a fool was I"). Again the rival publisher and printer produced The favourite songs in the opera of Julius Caesar and a sequel in 1724. Some of these songs in the Pocket Companion reappeared in Peter Prelleur's "The Modern Musick-Master", an instructional manual published in 1730 for those learning singing, harpsichord, oboe, flute or violin.

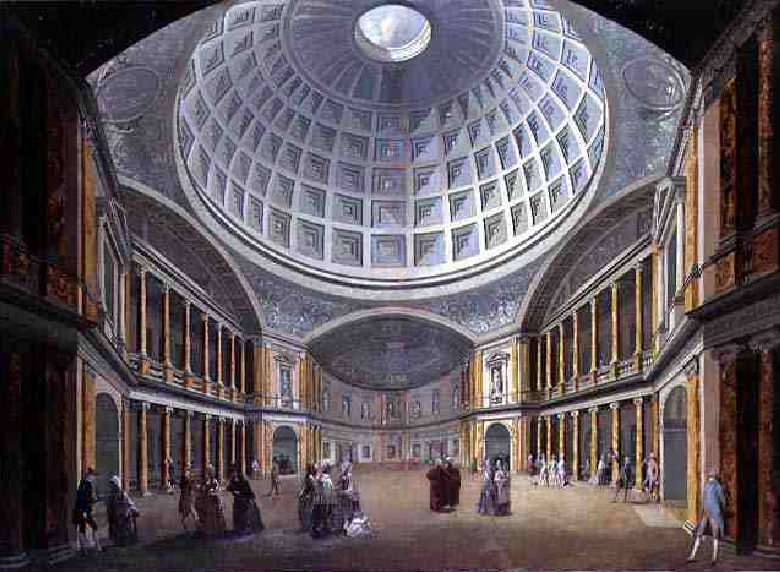
William Hodges: The Pantheon, Oxford Street, designed by Richard Wyatt in 1772

In 1784, during the centenary commemoration of Handel in Westminster Abbey and the London Pantheon, the second of five concerts, held on 27 May in the Pantheon, contained two numbers for Cesare sung by the castrato Pacchierotti—the hunting aria "Va tacito" and the accompanied recitative Alma del gran Pompeo. In his account of the performance, attended by George III, Charles Burney wrote of the aria:

Whoever is able to read a score, and knows the difficulty of writing in five real parts, must admire the resources which Handel has manifested in this. The French-horn part, which is almost a perpetual echo to the voice, has never been equalled in any air, so accompanied, that I remember. Few great singers are partial to songs in which melody and importance are so equally divided; but this air was chosen to do honour to the abilities of Handel, on a day when they were to shine in great splendor. And Signor Pacchierotti, by his judicious choice and excellent performance, at once contributed to the blaze of this great composer's reputation, and his own.

Burney described the audience in the Pantheon as restless during the recitative (sung in Italian), remarking that the original opera house audience had been captivated by the dramatic music. He described it as "the finest piece of accompanied recitative, without symphonies, with which I am acquainted. The modulation is learned, and so uncommon, that there is hardly a chord that the ear expects; and yet the words are well expressed, and the phrases pathetic and pleasing."

This commemoration, mounted on a giant scale, proved so popular that it was repeated in succeeding years.

The dissemination of Handel's music from Giulio Cesare for domestic music-making continued when one of Handel's two arrangements of the overture for harpsichord–the less ornamented and polished of the two–was included in Walsh's second collection of Handel overtures published in 1727; the chorus with horns was included as a dance. The overture itself was performed separately in concerts, including in London in 1729 and Manchester in 1745. There were also a few concerts in the 1720s where some of the more popular arias were performed. In 1789, following the culmination of Handel Commemoration concerts, a further volume of songs was published in London entitled Handel's songs selected from his most celebrated operas: for the harpsichord, voice, hoboy, or German flute. Printed by H. Wright in Catherine Street off the Strand and without English translations, it contained the arias Va tacito, Da tempeste, Non desperar and Venere bella as well as the duet Caro, bella, piu amabile belta. Despite the popularity and dissemination of Handel's music, changes in taste resulted in Samuel Arnold staging a revival of Giulio Cesare in 1787 as a "pasticcio" constructed from the original opera and other operas by Handel. In the accompanying libretto Arnold stated, "The original, however, offering a great number of incongruities, both in the language and the conduct, several material alterations have been thought absolutely necessary, to give the piece a dramatic consistency, and to suit it to the refinement of a modern audience."

==== France ====
In the summer of 1724, after the first run of Giulio Cesare had finished, the London cast gave a private concert performance in Paris at the residence of Pierre Crozat, retired royal treasurer and patron of the arts. Prior to the performance the Mercure de France had reported that Italians in the audience in London had rated the opera as a masterpiece. The trip, which lasted from July to September, had initially been planned for the previous year when, following similar favourable newspaper reports, fully staged performances of Ottone at the Paris Opera had been envisaged, with financial support from Louis XV. In the event, these plans were abandoned, and Ottone was also performed as a private concert. Senesino had fallen out with the company and Anastasia Robinson could not participate because of the complications in her private life, so a new female singer was brought in to fill the gaps they created, with Durastanti doubling some parts.

==== Germany ====
Within Handel's lifetime, the opera was also performed in Germany. In Braunschweig it was first performed in 1725 with revivals in 1727 and 1733. The opera was sung wholly in Italian using the 1724 London edition, but with some of Cornelia's arias altered. Ballets were also inserted for Egyptians at the end of act 1 and for eunuchs and concubines at the end of act 2.

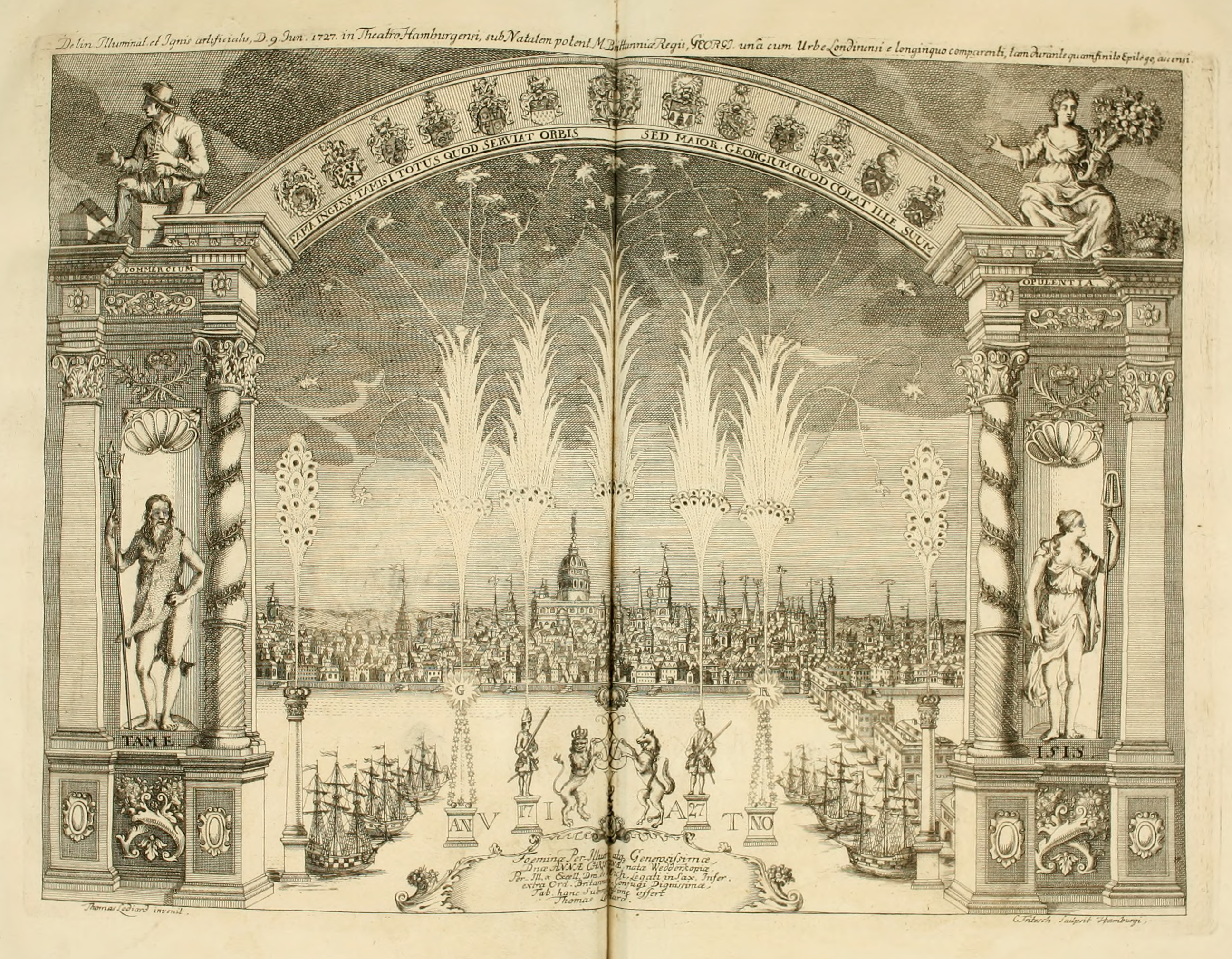
Plan by Lediard for on-stage firework display in the epilogue to the spectacle

In Hamburg, where Handel had himself been a violinist in the opera orchestra, the arias were sung in Italian but the recitatives were translated into German by the Englishman Thomas Lediard. He also designed the stage set. The score was modified and augmented by the musician J. G. Linike: he added orchestral accompaniments in some of the recitatives and introduced six ballet scenes, with one for Cleopatra's attendants during the Parnassus scene and a grand ballet before the final chorus. Unlike the Braunschweig performance and perhaps because Linike had recently been to London, not all the male roles were sung by tenors and basses: Cesare was sung by a castrato and Sesto by a soprano. The opera remained in the Hamburg repertoire until 1737, shortly before the demise of the failing company, although one performance in 1726 had an audience of only three and one performance in 1735 was cancelled for lack of an audience.

On 9 June 1727 Lediard devised a special performance in honour of the 68th birthday of George I which was repeated three times; the king unfortunately died two weeks after the event. The spectacle, entitled "The Joy and Happiness of the British Nation," involved a lengthy sung prologue with illuminations and an epilogue with fireworks ignited within the opera theatre. The entertainments were set to music by Georg Philipp Telemann with trumpets, horns and drums played from the galleries which contrasted with the flutes and violins that accompanied the Roman gods and nymphs on stage for the prologue. At the base of a large sculpture of George I, suitably attired singers portrayed Britain, Ireland, France, America and the House of Hanover. In the epilogue gods of water and wind were joined by personifications of the rivers Thames and Isis, with the backdrop changing from the dreaming spires of Oxford to the night sky over London with ships on the river. A "Martial Symphony" ended with the firing of 45 cannons heralding the firework display, after which all the windows and skylights in the theatre had to be opened to release the smoke.

=== Nineteenth century ===
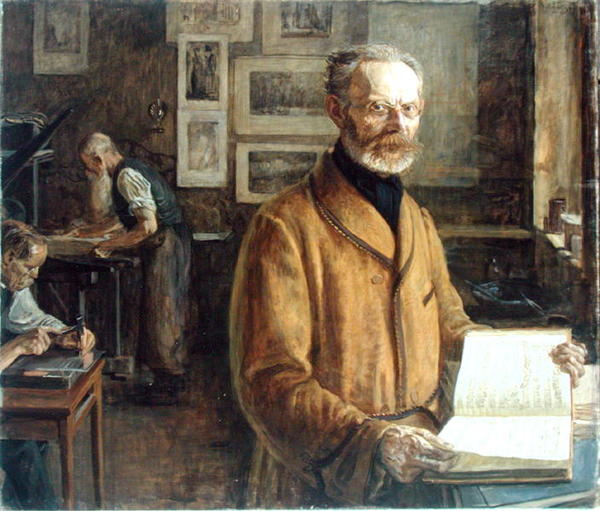
Friedrich Chrysander

The nineteenth century saw the publication by Breitkopf & Härtel of the complete works of Handel for the Händel-Gesellschaft with Friedrich Chrysander as editor. He produced a comprehensive full score in 1875, using all the available sources in London including those in the Royal Collection; Chrysander's volume gave all the variants in the different revivals. Like Handel's other works in the opera seria genre, however, there were no public performances of Giulio Cesare in the 19th century; opera seria had been supplanted by oratorios in the English language with large scale choral writing. By the early nineteenth century operas with librettos by Bussani or music by Handel had become obsolete; the opera Giulio Cesare in Egitto performed in the Teatro Argentina in Rome in 1821 was by Giovanni Pacini.

Of the fifty two songs from operas and oratorios in the "Royal Edition" selected by William Thomas Best in 1880, with English translations of the Italian texts by Maria X. Hayes, only three came from Giulio Cesare, all for Cleopatra: Piangerò la sorte mia ("Hope, no more this heart sustaining"); V'adoro, pupille, saette d'amore ("Ye dear eyes so tender"); and Da tempeste ("When by storms"). Chrysander's faithful rendition of Handel's original score was accompanied in 1878 by a seven volume compendium of opera and oratorio songs prepared for Breitkopf & Hārtel by Victorie Gervinus, widow of the Handel scholar Georg Gottfried Gervinus. The possible voice types—soprano, mezzo-soprano, alto, tenor, bass—are given for each aria or recitative. All the texts were in German with no reference to Italian or English; and in all the seven volumes there are only six numbers from Giulio Cesare: Alma del gran Pompeo (Vol. 1), Priva son d'ogni conforta (Vol.2), V'adoro pupille (Vol. 3), Svegliatevi nel core (Vol. 4), Nel tuo seno, amico sasso and Tutto può donna vezzosa (Vol. 5).

=== Twentieth century ===
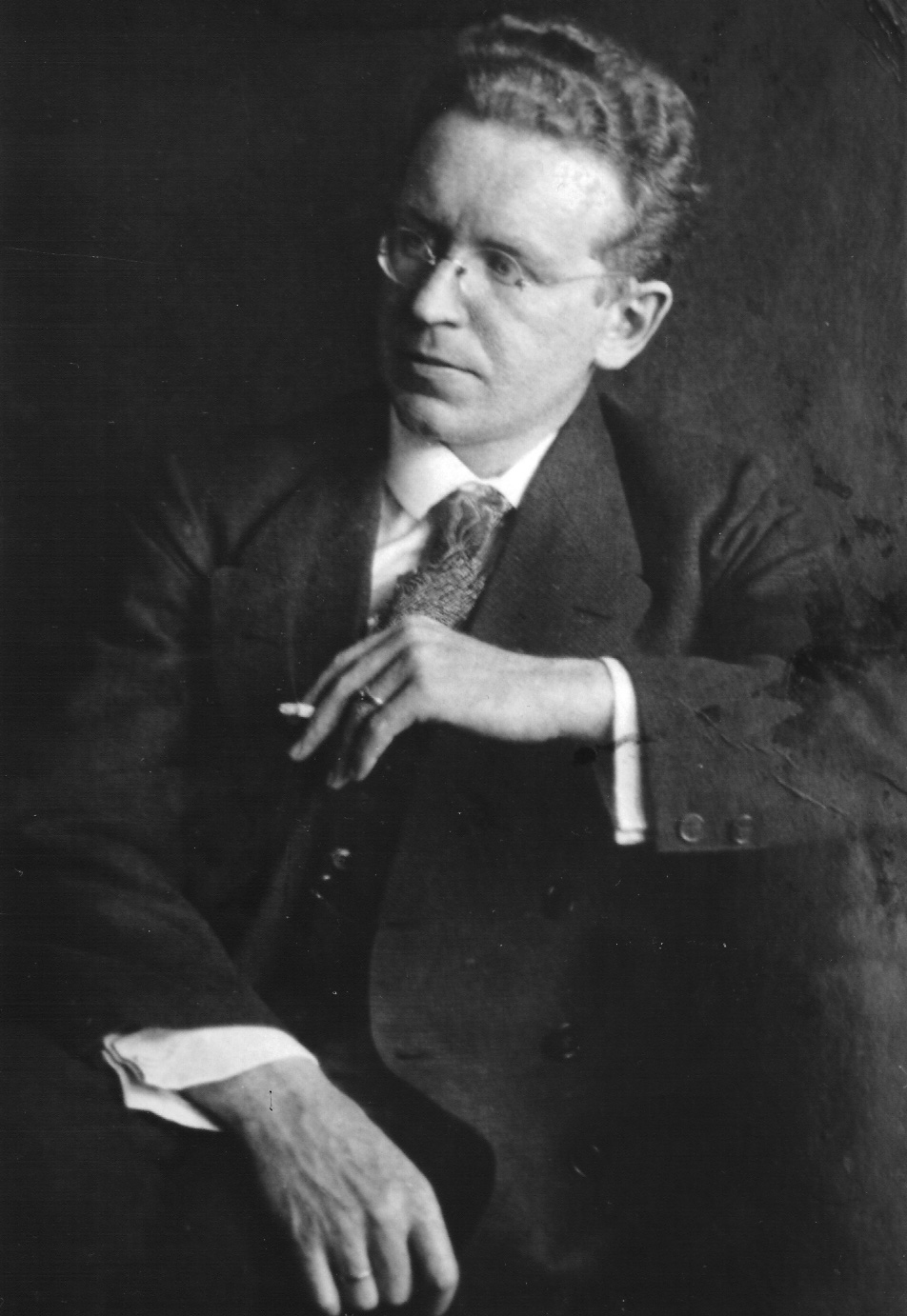
Oskar Hagen, the German art historian whose programme of Handel operas in Göttingen led to an international revival in performances of Handel operas

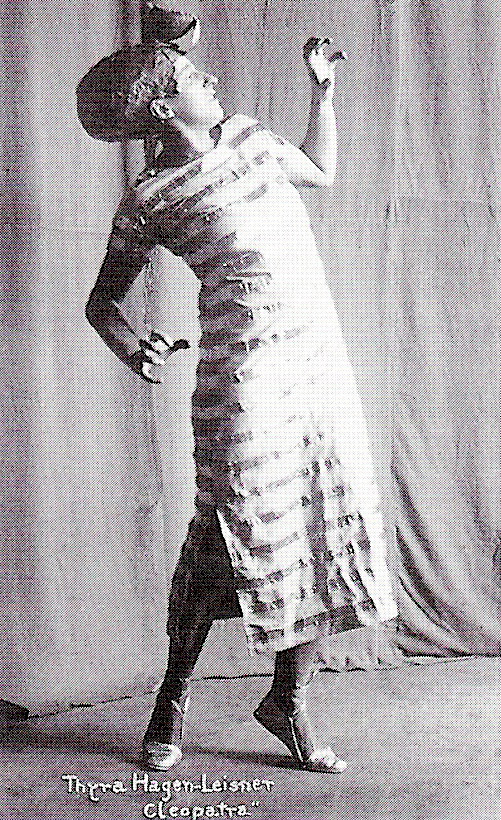
Thyra Leisner-Hagen, wife of Oskar Hagen and sister of the celebrated contralto Emmi Leisner, sang Cleopatra in Göttingen in 1922

Handel's operas were revived in the twentieth century by Oskar Hagen and other Handel enthusiasts in Göttingen, starting with Rodelinda in 1920 and Ottone in 1921. The first performance of Giulio Cesare was on 5 July 1922, with designs reminiscent of expressionist art, Bauhaus and silent film. Hagen's performing edition was significantly altered from Handel's score: it was translated into German, heavily edited and reorchestrated, with the male castrato roles transposed down for baritone, tenor or bass. As well as local singers for the chorus, the cast included Wilhelm Guttmann as Cesare, Thyra Hagen-Leisner as Cleopatra, Bruno Bergmann as Tolomeo, Eleanor Reynolds as Cornelia and G. A. Walter as Sesto. Hagen's vocal score was published by C. F. Peters and the version became popular throughout Germany, with performances in over 38 different localities within 5 years: Hans Knappertsbusch and Karl Böhm both conducted it in Munich in 1923; and it was also performed in neighbouring countries such as Austria (Vienna), Switzerland (Basel, Zürich, Bern), Denmark (Copenhagen) and Poland (Poznań).

On December 10th, 1956, It was first performed in Italy's La Scala(Milan), conducted by Gianandrea Gavazzeni, with Nicola Rossi-Lemeni( Giulio Cesare), Giulietta Simionato(Cornelia), Franco Corelli(Sesto), and Virginia Zeani(Cleopatra). The first American performance took place at the Smith College of Music in Northampton, Massachusetts, on 14 May 1927. The first British revival of a Handel opera was the staging of Giulio Cesare at the Scala Theatre in London in 1930, by the London Festival Opera Company, singing in English.

In 1966, the New York City Opera revived the then virtually unknown opera seria with Norman Treigle as Cesare and Beverly Sills as Cleopatra. Sills' performance in the production, and on the cast recording that followed, made her an international opera star.

Giulio Cesare is now regularly performed.

The first uncut performance of modern times with the voices at correct pitch did not take place until 1977 at the Barber Institute of Fine Arts in Birmingham, England. It has subsequently proven to be by far the most popular of Handel's operas, with more than two hundred productions in many countries.

Glyndebourne's 2005 production of Giulio Cesare by David McVicar has been described as "the audience's touchstone" for the work, in part through its Bollywood-inspired choreography. Danielle de Niese, starring as Cleopatra, was widely praised and would later marry Gus Christie, the owner of Glyndebourne. The production has been repeated at Glyndebourne in 2006, 2009, 2018 and 2024. The 2005 production was received negatively by Michael Tanner in The Spectator, who described it as the "slaughter of a masterpiece", but in 2024, Richard Bratby praised the production in The Spectator, claiming it had aged "like wine".

In modern productions, the title role, written for a castrato, is sung by a contralto, mezzo-soprano, or, more frequently in recent years, a countertenor. The roles of Tolomeo and Nireno are normally sung by countertenors. The role of Sesto, written for a soprano, is now usually sung by a mezzo-soprano.

The work is considered by many to be one of Handel's finest Italian operas, possibly even the best in the history of opera seria. It is admired for its superb vocal writing, its dramatic impact, and its deft orchestral arrangements.

== Recordings ==
=== Audio recordings ===
The discography below lists separately recordings with the title role of Cesare sung at the original pitch (as mezzo-soprano or counter-tenor) and those adopting the pre-historically informed performance practice of transposing the part down an octave to bass-baritone.

==== Cesare at original pitch ====
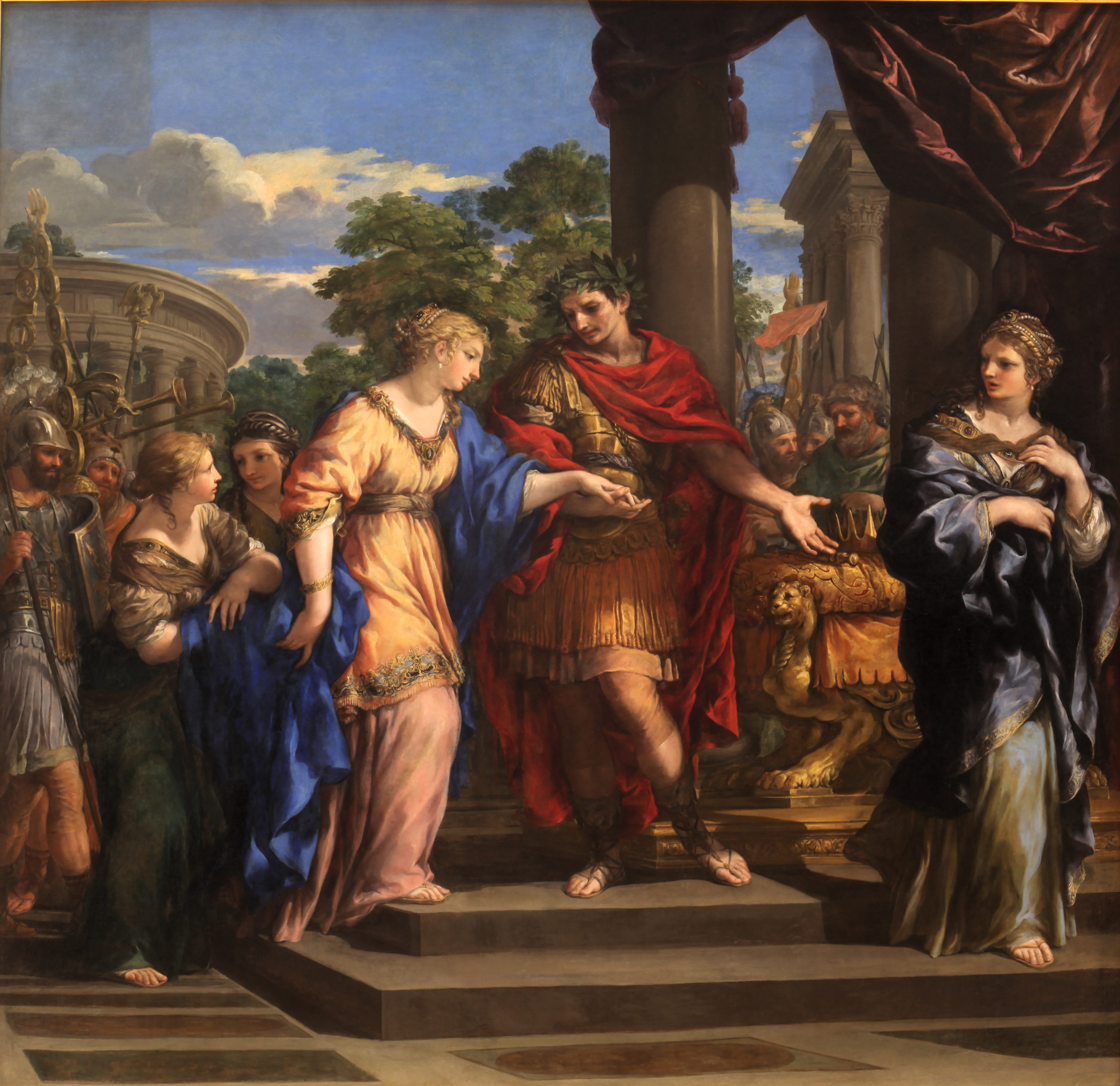
Caesar giving Cleopatra the throne of Egypt, Pietro da Cortona, 1637

Giulio Cesare discography, audio recordings with Cesare at original pitch
Year	Cast: Cesare, Cleopatra, Tolomeo, Cornelia Sesto, Achilla	Conductor, orchestra	Label
1969	Huguette Tourangeau, Joan Sutherland, Cvetka Ahlin, Ursula Boese, Lucia Popp, Tom Krause	Richard Bonynge, Philharmonisches Staatsorchester Hamburg	CD: Opera Depot cat.: OD 10123-2
1984	Janet Baker, Valerie Masterson, James Bowman, Sarah Walker, Della Jones, John Tomlinson	Charles Mackerras, English National Opera	CD: Chandos cat.: CHAN 3019
1991	Jennifer Larmore, Barbara Schlick, Derek Lee Ragin, Bernarda Fink, Marianne Rørholm, Furio Zanasi	René Jacobs, Concerto Köln	CD: Harmonia Mundi cat.: HMC 901385/87
2002	Marijana Mijanovic, Magdalena Kožená, Bejun Mehta, Charlotte Hellekant, Anne Sofie von Otter, Alan Ewing	Marc Minkowski, Les Musiciens du Louvre	CD: Archiv cat.: 474 210-2
2008	Kristina Hammarström, Emanuela Galli, Irini Karaianni, Mary-Ellen Nesi, Romina Basso, Tassis Christoyannis	George Petrou, Orchestra of Patras	CD: MDG cat.: MDG 609 1604-2
2011	Marie-Nicole Lemieux, Karina Gauvin, Romina Basso, Emőke Baráth, Filippo Mineccia, Johannes Weisser	Alan Curtis, Il Complesso Barocco	CD: naïve, cat.: EAN 709861305360
2026	Christophe Dumaux, Louise Alder, John Holiday, Beth Taylor, Paula Murrihy, Morgan Pearse	Harry Bicket, The English Concert	CD: Linn Records, cat.: CKD792

There is also a 1963 recording of highlights with Margreta Elkins (Cesare), Joan Sutherland (Cleopatra), Monica Sinclair (Tolomeo), Marilyn Horne (Cornelia), Richard Conrad (Sesto) and Richard Bonynge conducting the New Symphonic Orchestra of London on Decca (coupled with a complete performance of Alcina).

==== Cesare transposed ====
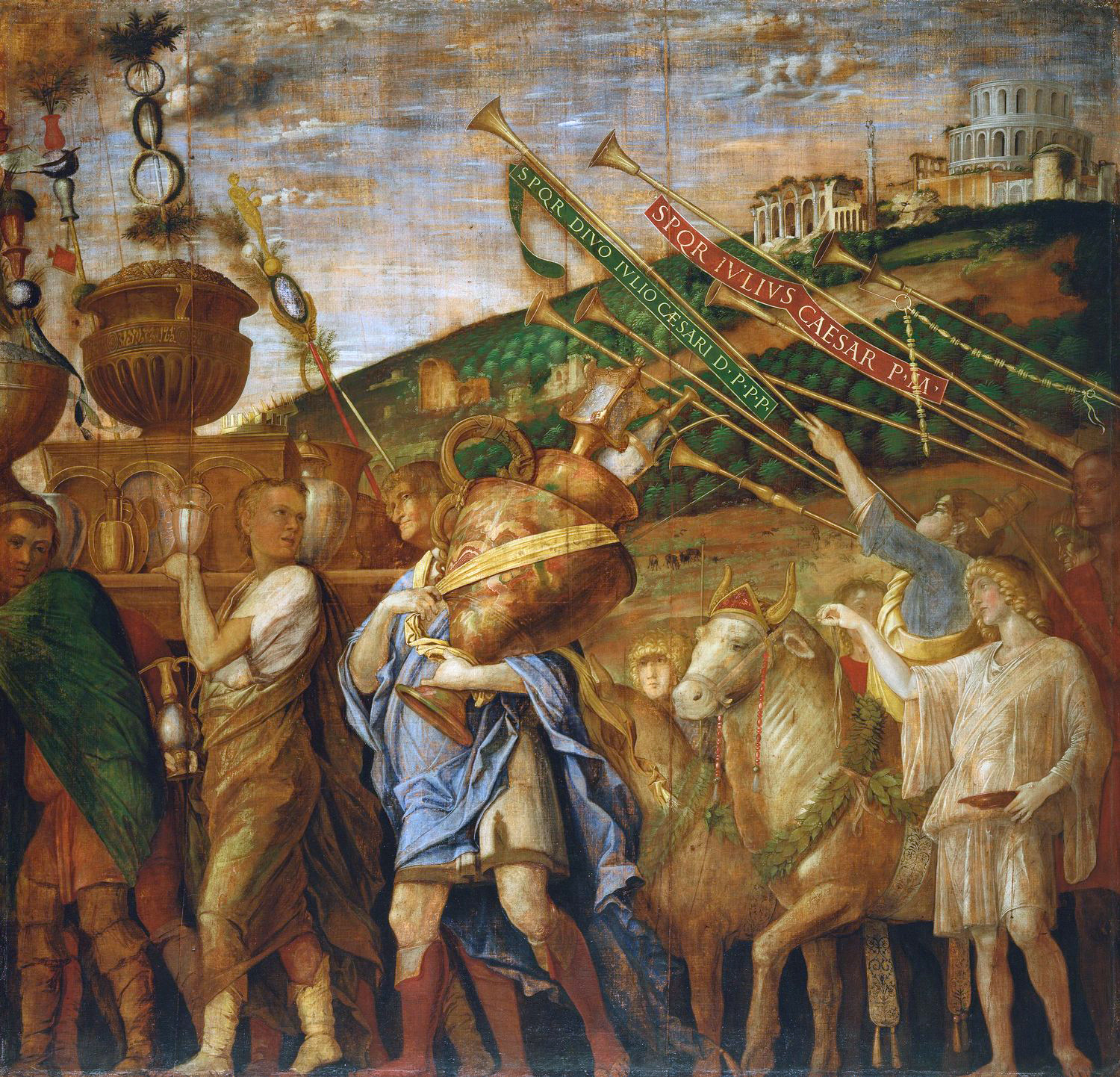
The Triumphs of Caesar: the Vase Bearers, Andrea Mantegna, Fifteenth century, Royal Collection

Giulio Cesare discography, audio recordings with Cesare transposed
Year	Cast: Cesare, Cleopatra, Tolomeo, Cornelia, Sesto, Achilla	Conductor, orchestra	Label
1965	Walter Berry, Lucia Popp, Karl-Christian Kohn, Christa Ludwig, Fritz Wunderlich, Hans Günter Nöcker	Ferdinand Leitner, Münchner Philharmoniker	CD: Orfeo d'Or cat.: C 351 943 D
1967	Norman Treigle, Beverly Sills, Spiro Malas, Maureen Forrester, Beverly Wolff, Dominic Cossa	Julius Rudel; New York City Opera	CD: RCA cat.: 6182
1969	Dietrich Fischer-Dieskau, Tatiana Troyanos, Franz Crass, Julia Hamari, Peter Schreier, Ernst Gerold Schramm	Karl Richter, Münchner Bach-Orchester	LP: Deutsche Grammophon cat.: 2711 009

=== Video recordings ===
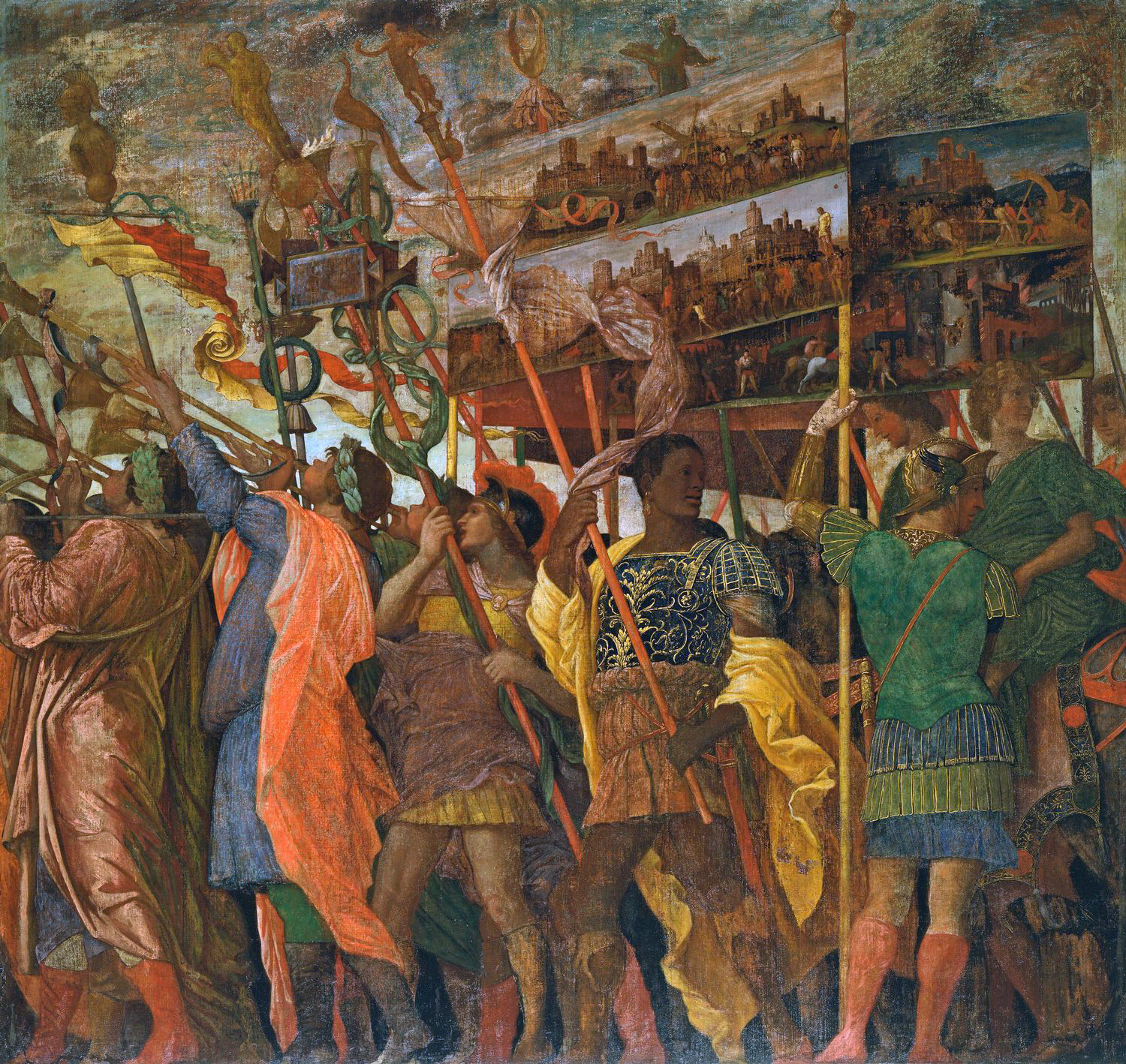
The Triumphs of Caesar: the Picture Bearers by Andrea Mantegna, fifteenth century, Royal Collection

Giulio Cesare discography, video recordings
Year	Cast: Cesare, Cleopatra, Tolomeo, Cornelia Sesto, Achilla	Conductor, orchestra	Stage director	Label
1984	Janet Baker, Valerie Masterson, James Bowman, Sarah Walker, Della Jones, John Tomlinson	Charles Mackerras, English National Opera	John Copley, London	DVD: Arthaus Musik cat.: 100308
1990	Jeffrey Gall, Susan Larson, Drew Minter, Mary Westbrook-Geha, Lorraine Hunt Lieberson, James Maddalena	Craig Smith, Staatskapelle Dresden	Peter Sellars, Berlin	DVD: Decca cat.: 0714089
1994	Graham Pushee, Yvonne Kenny, Andrew Dalton, Rosemary Gunn, Elizabeth Campbell, Stephen Bennett	Richard Hickox, Australian Opera	Francisco Negrin, Sydney	DVD: EuroArts cat.: 2053599
2004	Flavio Oliver, Elena de la Merced, Jordi Domènech, Ewa Podleś, Maite Beaumont, Oliver Zwarg	Michael Hofstetter, Gran Teatro del Liceo	Herbert Wernicke, Barcelona	DVD: TDK cat.: EAN 824121001407
2005	Sarah Connolly, Danielle de Niese, Christophe Dumaux, Patricia Bardon, Angelika Kirchschlager, Christopher Maltman	William Christie, Orchestra of the Age of Enlightenment	David McVicar, Glyndebourne	DVD: Opus Arte cat.: OA BD 7024 D
2005	Andreas Scholl, Inger Dam-Jensen, Christopher Robson, Randi Steene, Tuva Semmingsen, Palle Knudsen	Lars Ulrik Mortensen, Concerto Copenhagen	Francisco Negrin, Copenhagen	DVD: Harmonia Mundi cat.: HMD 9909008/09
2011	Lawrence Zazzo, Natalie Dessay, Christophe Dumaux, Varduhi Abrahamyan, Isabel Leonard, Nathan Berg	Emmanuelle Haïm, Le Concert d'Astrée	Laurent Pelly, Paris	DVD: Virgin cat.: 0709399
2012	Andreas Scholl, Cecilia Bartoli, Christophe Dumaux, Anne Sofie von Otter, Philippe Jaroussky, Ruben Drole	Giovanni Antonini, Il Giardino Armonico	Moshe Leiser, Patrice Caurier, Salzburg	DVD: Decca cat.: EAN 044007438565
2013	David Daniels, Natalie Dessay, Christophe Dumaux, Patricia Bardon, Alice Coote, Guido Loconsolo	Harry Bicket, Metropolitan Opera Orchestra and Chorus	David McVicar	HD video: Met Opera on Demand
2021	Bejun Mehta, Louise Alder, Christophe Dumaux, Patricia Bardon, Jake Arditti, Simon Bailey	Ivor Bolton, Concentus Musicus Wien	Keith Warner, Theater an der Wien	HD video: Unitel
