= Christophe Dumaux =

French classical countertenor

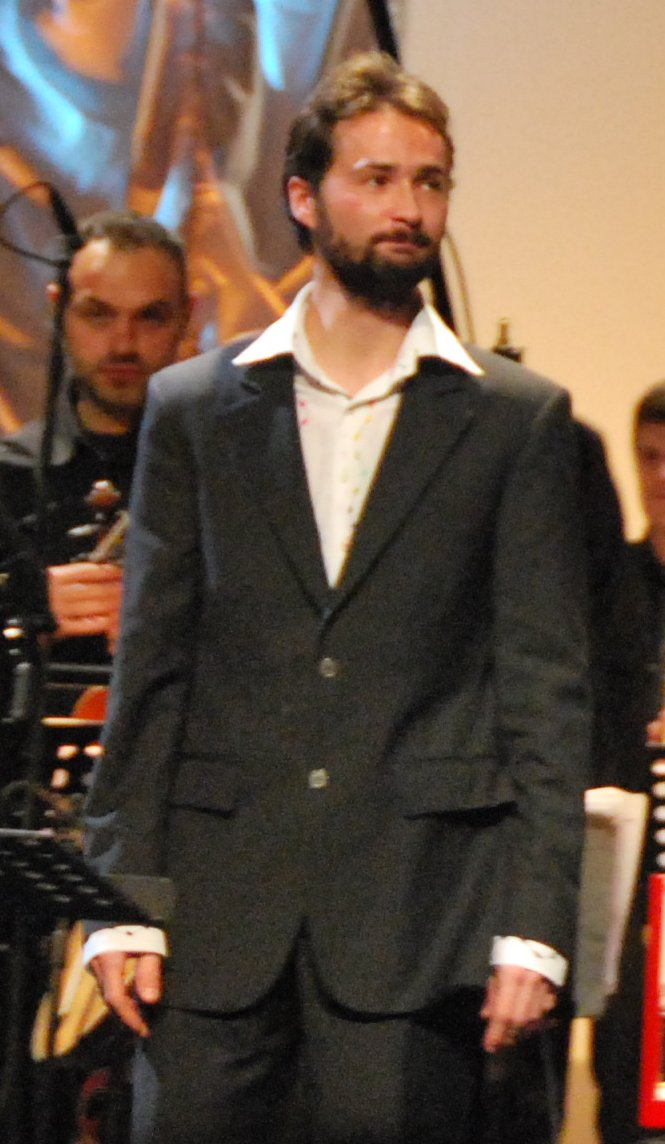
- Christophe Dumaux
- Born: 1979 (age 46–47)
- Occupation: Operatic countertenor
- Years active: 2002–present

Christophe Dumaux (born 1979) is a French classical countertenor.

== Life and career ==
Christophe Dumaux initially studied voice and cello at his local conservatory in Châlons-en-Champagne and in 2000 entered the Conservatoire National Supérieur de Musique in Paris. In July 2002 at the age of 21, he made his professional debut singing the role of Eustazio in Handel's Rinaldo at the Festival de Radio France et Montpellier. Since then he has sung as a soloist with several prominent baroque music ensembles, including William Christie's Le Jardin des Voix and Les Arts Florissants, Emmanuelle Haïm's Le Concert d’Astrée, and Il Combattimento Consort di Amsterdam.

He made his American debut in 2003 at the Spoleto Festival in Charleston, South Carolina singing the title role in Handel's Tamerlano. Several other major house and company debuts soon followed, including: the Théâtre de la Monnaie in Brussels as Giuliano in Cavalli's Eliogabalo (2004); Santa Fe Opera as Ottone in Handel's Agrippina (2004); the Opéra national de Paris as Ottone in Monteverdi's L'incoronazione di Poppea (2005); Glyndebourne Festival Opera as Tolomeo in Handel's Giulio Cesare (2005); and the New York Metropolitan Opera first as Unulfo in Handel's Rodelinda (2006). and a critically acclaimed Tolomeo in Handel's Giulio Cesare (2013).

== Selected recordings ==
- Handel: Rinaldo (Vivica Genaux, Christophe Dumaux, Miah Persson, James Rutherford, Inga Kalna, Lawrence Zazzo, Dominique Visse; Conductor: René Jacobs; Orchestra/Ensemble: Freiburg Baroque Orchestra) CD 2003. Label: Harmonia Mundi.
- Handel: Giulio Cesare (Sarah Connolly, Christopher Maltman, Patricia Bardon, Christophe Dumaux, Angelika Kirchschlager, Danielle De Niese, Rachid Ben Abdeslam; Conductor: William Christie; Orchestra/Ensemble: Orchestra of the Age of Enlightenment, Glyndebourne Festival Chorus), DVD 2006. Label: BBC/Opus Arte.
- Cavalli: Il Giasone (Christophe Dumaux, Katarina Bradić, Robin Johannsen; Conductor: Federico Maria Sardelli; Director Mariame Clément; Orchestra/Ensemble Vlaamse Opera), DVD 2010. Label: Dynamic.
- Handel: Partenope Christophe Dumaux, Andreas Scholl, Inger Dam Jensen, Tuva Semmingsen, Lars Ulrik Mortensen
