= Tamerlano =

Opera by George Frideric Handel

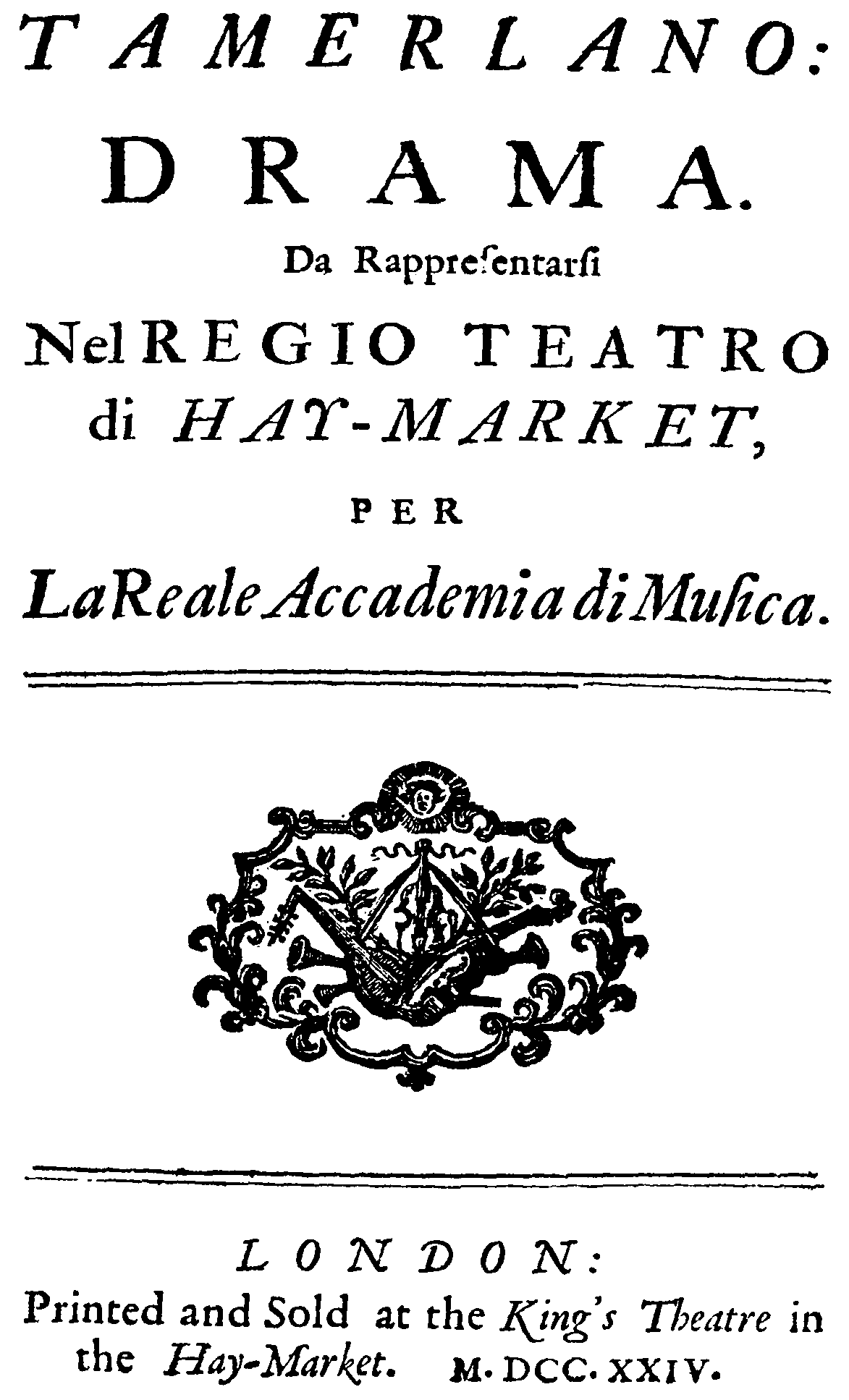
Title page of libretto

Tamerlano (Tamerlane, HWV 18) is an opera seria in three acts by George Frideric Handel. The Italian libretto was by Nicola Francesco Haym, adapted from Agostino Piovene's Tamerlano together with another libretto entitled Bajazet after Nicolas Pradon's Tamerlan, ou La Mort de Bajazet. The opera was staged by the Royal Academy of Music in the King's Theatre at the Haymarket, London.

== History and context ==
George Frideric Handel

The German-born Handel, after spending some of his early career composing operas and other pieces in Italy, settled in London, where in 1711 he had brought Italian opera for the first time with his opera Rinaldo. A tremendous success, Rinaldo created a craze in London for Italian opera seria, a form focused overwhelmingly on solo arias for the star virtuoso singers. In 1719, Handel was appointed music director of an organisation called the Royal Academy of Music (unconnected with the present day London conservatoire), a company under royal charter to produce Italian operas in London. Handel was not only to compose operas for the company but hire the star singers, supervise the orchestra and musicians, and adapt operas from Italy for London performance.

Viewed as one of Handel's major works, he composed it in the space of 20 days in July 1724, in a year in which two more great operas were composed by him: Rodelinda and Giulio Cesare. Rodelinda and Tamerlano were shorter than Giulio Cesare, about thirty numbers each compared to forty-four in Giulio Cesare. Eve Meyer has noted that the role of Bajazet was one of the first major tenor roles in opera, and has also commented on the place of the opera in the context of the contemporary fashion for Turkish culture (turquerie).

The opera is scored for two recorders, two flutes, two oboes, bassoon, two horns, strings, and continuo instruments (cello, lute, harpsichord).

18th century musicologist Charles Burney wrote of Tamerlano: "the overture is well known, and retains its favour among the most striking and agreeable of Handel's instrumental productions.. Many of Handel's operas offer perhaps more specimens of his fire and learning, but none more pleasing melodies and agreeable effects."

Paul Henry Lang wrote in 1966: "here the principal role, that of Bajazet, is given to a tenor....This is the first great tenor role in opera. Handel was entirely successful in portraying Bajazet."

== Performance history ==
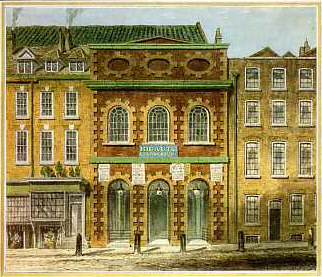
The King's Theatre, London, where Tamerlano was first performed

Tamerlano was first performed at the King's Theatre, London, on 31 October 1724, around the time of the annual performance of Nicholas Rowe's play of Tamerlane (4–5 November). There were 12 performances and it was repeated on 13 November 1731. The opera then received a production in Hamburg with the recitative in German and the arias in Italian. The first modern production was in Karlsruhe on 7 September 1924. Amongst recent productions, it appeared in the repertory of the Washington National Opera in 2008 and of the Los Angeles Opera in November 2009; both productions featured tenor Plácido Domingo who also appeared as Bajazet in a production at Teatro Real, Madrid, in 2008. An authentic, fully staged production was mounted by the Haymarket Opera of Chicago in September 2024. All performances were sold out at the Jarvis Opera Hall at DePaul University, wherein great attention to historial details of the original were paid.

== Music ==
Tamerlano is distinguished by its dramatic structure, particularly in the second half of the opera. While the first act and the beginning of the second largely follow the conventional alternation of secco recitatives and da capo arias, the later scenes make increasingly extensive use of accompanied recitative and more flexible musical forms. Bajazet's death scene in the third act is generally regarded as one of the dramatic highlights of Handel's operatic works.

The role of Bajazet, written for the tenor Francesco Borosini, is particularly demanding in its portrayal of conflicting emotions. In the third act, his furious aria "Empio, per farti guerra" is characterised by forceful repeated notes and rapid string passages. His subsequent death scene moves between anger, despair and tenderness. The arioso "Figlia mia, non pianger, no", in F minor, takes the form of a siciliana, accompanied pianissimo by four-part strings without harpsichord. It is followed without interruption by a final accompanied recitative, in which Bajazet's increasingly fragmented vocal phrases depict his approaching death.

== Roles ==
Roles, voice types, and premiere cast
Role	Voice type	Premiere cast, 31 October 1724
Tamerlano, Emperor of the Tartars	alto castrato	Andrea Pacini
Bajazet, Sultan of the Turks	tenor	Francesco Borosini
Asteria, Bajazet's daughter	soprano	Francesca Cuzzoni
Andronico, Greek prince	alto castrato	Francesco Bernardi, called "Senesino"
Irene, Princess of Trebizond, betrothed to Tamerlano	contralto (*)	Anna Vincenza Dotti
Leone, friend of Andronico and Tamerlano	bass	Giuseppe Maria Boschi

(*) Usually mezzo-soprano in modern performances

== Synopsis ==
Place: Prusa
Time: 1402

=== Act 1 ===
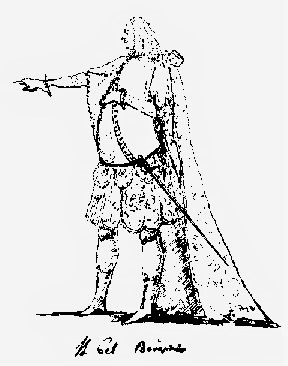
Caricature of Francesco Borosini, who created the role of Bajazet

The defeated Ottoman Emperor Bajazet is brought in chains to the court of Tamerlano. Tamerlano has ordered Andronico to remove the chains, but Bajazet is mistrustful of this action. Bajazet adds that the only reason he does not commit suicide is his love for his daughter, Asteria. (Aria: "Forte e lieto a morte andrei"). Tamerlano arrives and orders Andronico to try to obtain Bajazet and Asteria's consent for Asteria to marry Tamerlano, with a reward for Andronico of the Greek throne, marriage with Irene, and freedom for Bajazet. Andronico is troubled, as he brought his love Asteria to try to soften Tamerlano, only to see Tamerlano fall in love with her. (Aria: "Bella Asteria"). Tamerlano tells Asteria of his intentions and the offer to Andronico, which makes her angry at Andronico's seeming betrayal.

Bajazet declines Tamerlano's offer, and furthermore is angry at his daughter's seeming meekness at Tamerlano's demands. (Aria: "Ciel e terra armi di sdegno"). However, once alone, Asteria says that despite Andronico's apparent treachery, her feelings for him have not changed. (Aria: "Deh, lasciatemi.") Irene arrives to learn that she is no longer to marry Tamerlano, but instead Andronico. Andronico tells Irene that she can still change the outcome if she pretends to be her own messenger and takes issue with Tamerlano. She agrees to this plan, while he bemoans his current compromised situation.

=== Act 2 ===
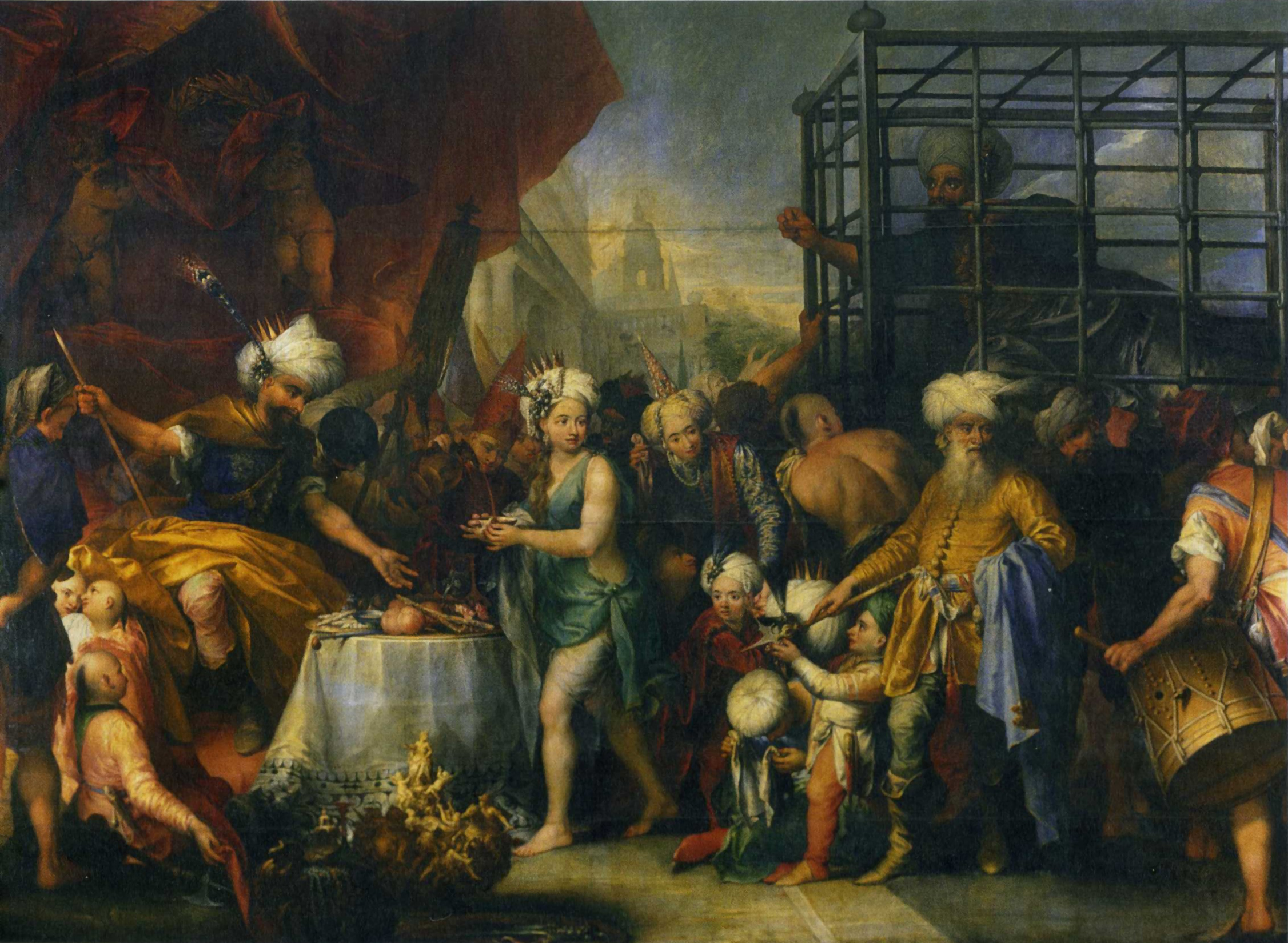
Tamerlan and Bajazet

Tamerlano tells Andronico of Asteria's acceptance of his marriage proposal, and that the two planned weddings, of Tamerlano to Asteria and of Andronico to Irene, will happen soon. Tamerlano and Asteria sing contrasting arias at the situation. Asteria pretends to tell Andronico that she is about to marry Tamerlano, but through a misunderstanding, Andronico is left dejected at the thought. Meanwhile, Leone brings the disguised Irene to Tamerlano, where she pleads Irene's case. (Aria: "Par che mi nasca.") Tamerlano hears her with composure. When Irene and Asteria are alone, Asteria shows sympathy towards Irene and speaks of her own feelings. Irene finds hope in this revelation, while Leone "comments only on love's irresistible power for good or evil".

Bajazet is outraged at his daughter's impending marriage to Tamerlano and swears to stop this, while Andronico is furious and resolves to have his vengeance on Tamerlano before he kills himself. Asteria is secretly preparing to kill Tamerlano in the meantime. However, Bajazet manages to stall the wedding, and also avoids being humiliated by Tamerlano when he is stopped. Asteria makes a move to the dais, only for her father to stop her. She then pulls out a dagger, saying that it would have been her present to Tamerlano. After a trio between Tamerlano, Bajazet, and Asteria, Tamerlano orders the death of Bajazet and Asteria. However, Asteria protests that she has never been unfaithful and gets agreement from Bajazet, Andronico, and Irene, which gives her some feeling of happiness. She also feels sad that her plans for assassination failed and that she has lost her chance for happiness.

=== Act 3 ===
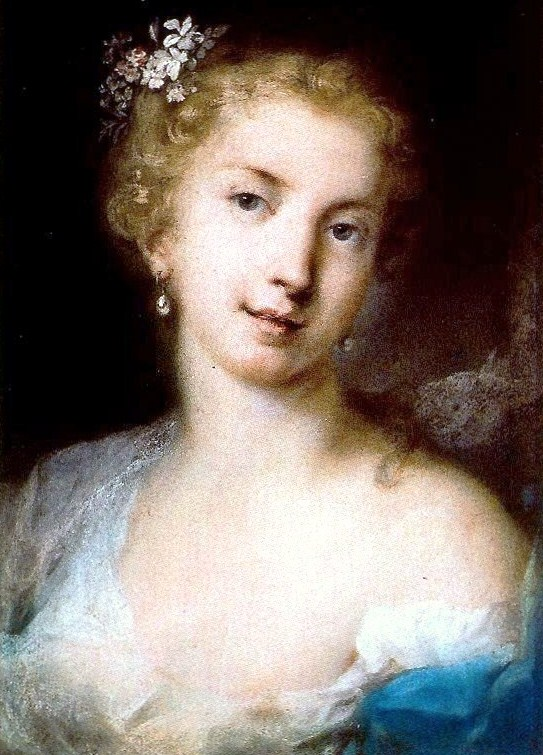
Francesca Cuzzoni (1696–1778), who created the role of Asteria

Asteria and Bajazet decide to kill themselves with concealed poison. Alone, Asteria contemplates her oncoming death. Tamerlano makes one last attempt to win Asteria and says that he will even pardon her father. However, Andronico and Asteria declare their love for each other, which enrages Tamerlano and makes him swear his own revenge. Bajazet tries to gain inspiration from their action, while the couple can only find happiness in facing together whatever may come of declaring their mutual love.

Meanwhile, Irene pledges her love to Tamerlano if he returns his own love to her, while Leone hopes that ultimately love will win the day over revenge. Tamerlano prepares to humiliate his enemies, and begins by bringing Bajazet and then Asteria before him. Andronico pleads for mercy from Tamerlano. Tamerlano will not listen, and orders Asteria to become his servant, and that she must first serve him wine. Asteria puts the poison from her father into the cup. Irene then reveals her true identity to Tamerlano and the situation of the poisoned cup. Tamerlano then orders Asteria to decide who first to give the cup to, her father or Andronico, before she may bring it to him. Asteria is about to drink from the cup herself when Andronico hits it out of her hand, which further enrages Tamerlano. He orders Asteria's arrest and confinement in the common seraglio, and that Bajazet will have to see her being shamed. Bajazet, angry at this situation, declares that his spirit will haunt Tamerlano when he has died. (Aria:''Empio, per farti guerra".)

Irene and Tamerlano sing of the happy life that awaits them, after Tamerlano has had his revenge. Leone then reports the arrival of Asteria and Bajazet. Bajazet is surprisingly serene now, but finally reveals that this is because he has taken poison. As he becomes more incoherent, he says goodbye to his daughter and berates Tamerlano, until Andronico and Asteria carry him out of the room. Asteria then returns to ask for death, since Tamerlano can never get what he wants from her. Both Irene and Andronico send after Asteria to try to stop her suicide, while Tamerlano is finally changed by the events he has witnessed as well as by Irene's pleas. He finally pardons Asteria, Andronico, and Bajazet. The opera concludes with a love duet between Tamerlano and Irene, and the chorus sings of love's ability to save light from the dark.

== Recordings ==
=== Audio recordings ===
Tanerlano discography, audio recordings
Year	Cast: Tamerlano, Bajazet, Asteria, Andronico, Irene, Leone	Conductor, orchestra	Label
1970	Gwendolyn Killebrew, Alexander Young, Carole Bogard, Sophia Steffan, Joanna Simon, Marius Rintzler	John Moriarty, Chamber Orchestra of Copenhagen	CD:Parnassus; Cat:PACD96038/40
1984	Henri Ledroit, John Elwes, Mieke van der Sluis, René Jacobs, Isabelle Poulenard, Gregory Reinhart	Jean-Claude Malgoire, La Grande Écurie et la Chambre du Roy	CD:The Sony Opera House; Cat: 88697527252
1985	Derek Lee Ragin, Nigel Robson, Nancy Argenta, Michael Chance, Jane Findlay, René Schirrer	John Eliot Gardiner, English Baroque Soloists	CD:Warner Classics; Cat:2564698383
2007	Nicholas Spanos, Tassis Christoyannis, Mata Katsuli, Mary-Ellen Nesi, Irina Karaianni, Petros Magoulas	George Petrou, Orchestra of Patras	CD:MDG Scene; Cat: MDG6091457
2014	Xavier Sabata, John Mark Ainsley, Karina Gauvin, Max Emanuel Cenčić, Ruxandra Donose, Pavel Kudinov	Riccardo Minasi; Il Pomo d'Oro	CD:Naïve Records; Cat: V5373

=== Video recordings ===
Tamerlano discography, video recordings
Year	Cast: Tamerlano, Bajazet, Asteria, Andronico, Irene, Leone	Conductor, orchestra	Stage director	Label
2001	Monica Bacelli, Thomas Randle, Elisabeth Norberg-Schulz, Graham Pushee, Anna Bonitatibus, Antonio Abete	Trevor Pinnock; The English Concert	Jonathan Miller	DVD:Arthaus Musik; Cat: 100703
2008	Monica Bacelli, Plácido Domingo, Ingela Bohlin, Sara Mingardo, Jennifer Holloway, Luigi De Donato	Paul McCreesh; Teatro Real, Madrid	Graham Vick	DVD:Opus Arte; Cst: OA1006D
2017	Christophe Dumaux, Jeremy Ovenden, Sophie Karthäuser, Delphine Galou, Ann Hallenberg, Nathan Berg	Christophe Rousset Les Talens Lyriques	Pierre Audi	Alpha 715 2 blu-ray discs (Alcina, Tamerlano)

== See also ==
- Bajazet by Vivaldi using the same libretto by Piovenne.
