= David McVicar =

British opera director

Sir David McVicar (born 1966) is a Scottish opera and theatre director.

== Biography ==
McVicar was born in Glasgow in 1966. He studied as an actor at the Royal Scottish Academy of Music and Drama, graduating in 1989. In 2007, The Independent ranked him among the 100 most influential gay and lesbian people in Britain. He was the guest on the BBC's Desert Island Discs on 5 October 2008.

He was created a Knight Bachelor in the 2012 Birthday Honours for services to opera.

== Selected productions ==
- Adriana Lecouvreur: Royal Opera House
- Andrea Chenier: Royal Opera House
- Agrippina: La Monnaie, Théâtre des Champs-Élysées, English National Opera
- Aida: Royal Opera House
- Alcina: Bilbao, Oviedo, English National Opera
- Anna Bolena: Metropolitan Opera 2011
- Billy Budd: Lyric Opera of Chicago
- La bohème: Glyndebourne Festival Opera
- La Calisto: La Scala 2021
- Carmen: Glyndebourne Festival Opera
- Cavalleria rusticana/Pagliacci: Metropolitan Opera 2015
- La clemenza di Tito: English National Opera
- Les contes d'Hoffmann: Salzburg Festival, Vlaamse Opera
- Don Carlos: Metropolitan Opera 2022
- Don Giovanni: La Monnaie
- Elektra: Lyric Opera of Chicago
- Faust: La Monnaie
- Fedora: Metropolitan Opera, 2022
- Fidelio: New Zealand International Arts Festival
- Giulio Cesare: Glyndebourne Festival Opera, Metropolitan Opera 2013
- Hamlet: Opera North
- Idomeneo: Vlaamse Opera, Scottish Opera
- L'incoronazione di Poppea: Théâtre des Champs-Élysées, Opéra national du Rhin, Copenhagen Opera House
- Macbeth: Mariinsky Theatre, Royal Opera House
- Madama Butterfly: Scottish Opera
- Manon: New Zealand Opera, Dallas Opera, Houston Grand Opera, Liceu
- Maria Stuarda: Metropolitan Opera, 2013
- I masnadieri: La Scala 2019
- Medea: Metropolitan Opera, 2022
- A Midsummer Night's Dream: La Monnaie
- Norma: Metropolitan Opera, 2017
- Le nozze di Figaro: Royal Opera House
- The Rape of Lucretia: Aldeburgh Festival
- Il re pastore: Opera North
- Rigoletto: Royal Opera House
- Rusalka: Lyric Opera of Chicago
- Der Rosenkavalier: Opera North, Scottish Opera
- Roberto Devereux: Metropolitan Opera 2016
- Salome: Royal Opera House
- Semele: Théâtre des Champs-Élysées, Opéra national du Rhin
- Sweeney Todd: Opera North
- Tamerlano: Deutsche Oper am Rhein
- Tosca: English National Opera, Metropolitan Opera 2017
- Il trittico: Scottish Opera 2023
- Il trovatore: Metropolitan Opera 2013, Lyric Opera of Chicago, San Francisco Opera
- Turandot: Scottish Opera 2026
- Wozzeck: Lyric Opera of Chicago
- Die Zauberflöte: La Monnaie, Royal Opera House
- Médée by Marc-Antoine Charpentier : Opéra Garnier 2024

== Video recordings ==
McVicar's productions of Faust, Le nozze di Figaro, Die Zauberflöte, Rigoletto and Salome at the Royal Opera House, Covent Garden, his Carmen and much-acclaimed Giulio Cesare at Glyndebourne, and his Manon at the Liceu are all available on DVD.

Of his thirteen productions for the Metropolitan Opera, all are available for streaming in HD video at Met Opera on Demand:

- Il Trovatore (performances of 30 April 2011 and 3 October 2015)
- Anna Bolena (15 October 2011)
- Maria Stuarda (19 January 2013)
- Giulio Cesare (27 April 2013)
- Cavalleria Rusticana & Pagliacci (25 April 2015)
- Roberto Devereux (16 April 2016)
- Norma (7 October 2017)
- Tosca (27 January 2018)
- Adriana Lecouvreur (12 January 2019)
- Agrippina (29 February 2020)
- Don Carlos (26 March 2022)
- Medea (22 October 2022)
- Fedora (14 January 2023)
