= Emmanuelle Haïm =

French harpsichordist and conductor

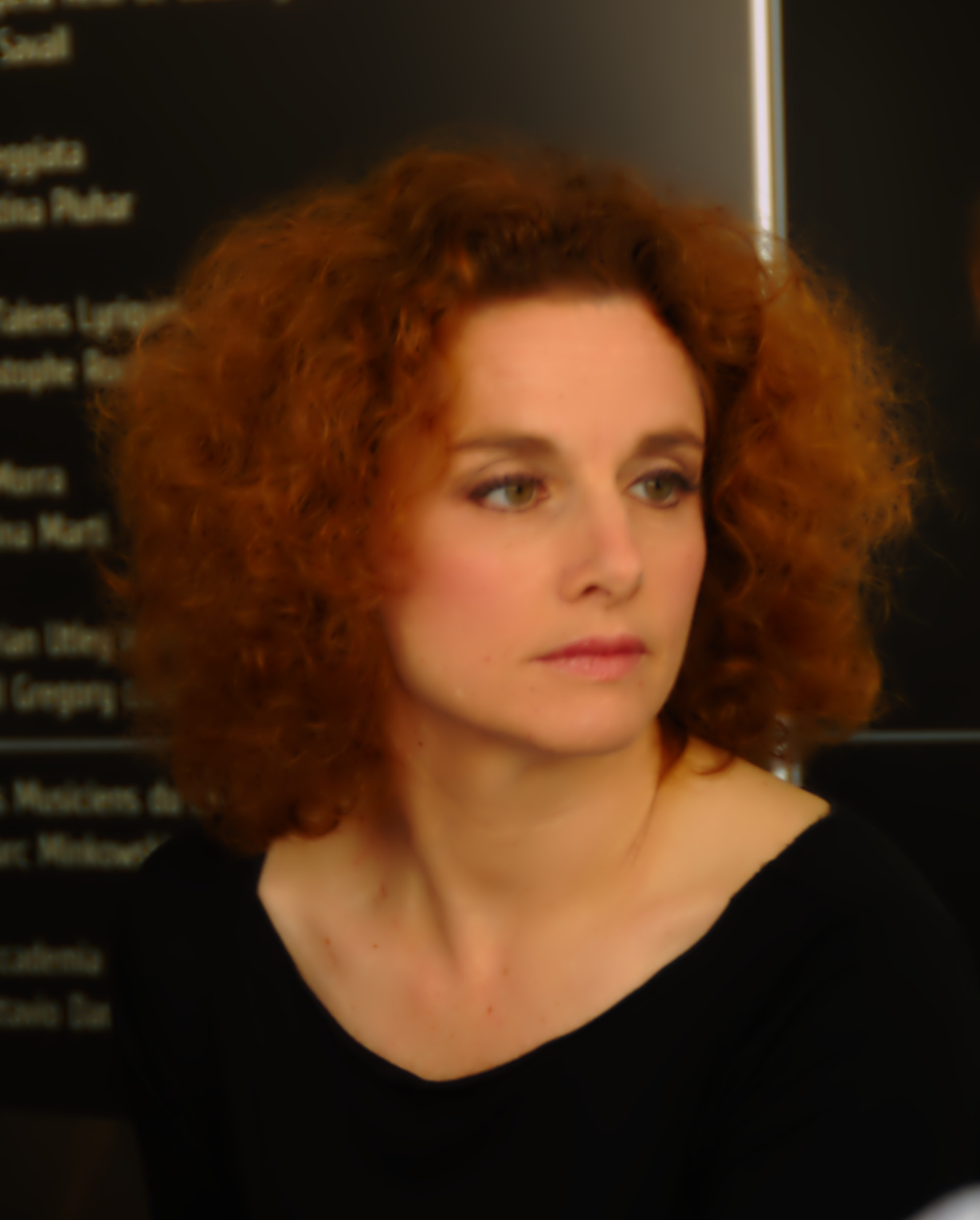
- Emmanuelle Haïm during the press conference inaugurating the 8th Misteria Paschalia festival, 18 April 2011

Background information
- Born: 11 May 1962 (age 64)
- Origin: Paris, France
- Genres: Baroque
- Occupations: Harpsichordist; conductor
- Instruments: Harpsichord; piano; organ
- Years active: 1990–present
- Labels: Virgin, Erato
- Website: www.leconcertdastree.fr

Emmanuelle Haïm (French pronunciation: [ɛmanɥɛl aim]; born 11 May 1962) is a French harpsichordist and conductor with a particular interest in early music and Baroque music.

== Early life, student and assistant years ==
Haïm was born and grew up in Paris, and was raised Catholic although her father is Jewish. Her musical education began early, after her father's purchase of a grand piano, and a visit to her family by Zoltán Kocsis when she was age 8. She was also interested in dance as a child, but was diagnosed with a curved spine at age 10, and wore a body corset for 10 years.

Haïm spent 13 years studying at the Conservatoire Supérieur de Musique et de Danse in Paris, where she studied organ with André Isoir. She came to focus on the harpsichord, which she studied with Kenneth Gilbert and Christophe Rousset, and was awarded five first prizes at the Conservatoire. William Christie invited her to work with his ensemble Les Arts Florissants, as a continuo player and musical assistant. On Christie's recommendation, she later worked as a coach and assistant to Simon Rattle, as well as a guest artist with Rattle.

== Conducting career ==
After several years, Haïm left Les Arts Florissants to become a conductor. In 2000, she formed her own baroque era ensemble, "Le Concert d'Astrée", with which she has conducted and toured regularly.

Haïm's 2001 conducting debut with Glyndebourne Touring Opera, in a production of Handel's Rodelinda, brought her to wider artistic notice. She returned to Glyndebourne in 2006 to conduct their production of Giulio Cesare. Her first conducting appearance at The Proms was in July 2008. Her US conducting debut was in 2003, with Chicago Opera Theater. On 2 November 2007 she became the first woman to conduct at the Lyric Opera of Chicago, conducting Giulio Cesare. Her first US conducting appearance with a symphony orchestra was in November 2011, in Los Angeles.

In 2023, Haïm conducted Handel's Giulio Cesare in a new production by Calixto Bieito for the Dutch National Opera with Le Concert d'Astrée, Purcell's The Indian Queen at the Grand Théâtre de Luxembourg, a new production of Mozart's Don Giovanni directed by Guy Cassiers with the Opéra de Lille, and a new production of Rameau's Platée for Zürich Opera House directed by Jetske Mijnssen.

== Personal life ==
Haïm has been married and divorced. She is the mother of a daughter, Louise, from her relationship with oboist Laurent Decker.

== Recording career ==
Haïm has a recording contract with Virgin Classics. Her collaborators have included Natalie Dessay, Ian Bostridge, Rolando Villazón, Philippe Jaroussky, Susan Graham, Sara Mingardo and Laurent Naouri.

Discography (extract)

- Handel, Arcadian Duets with Natalie Dessay, Laura Claycomb, Véronique Gens et al. (2002, Virgin Classics)
- Purcell, Dido and Aenas with Susan Graham, Ian Bostridge et al. (2003, Virgin Classics)
- Monteverdi, L'Orfeo with Ian Bostridge, Natalie Dessay, Véronique Gens et al. (2004, Virgin Classics)
- Handel, Delirio with Natalie Dessay (2005, Virgin Classics)
- Monteverdi, Il Combatimento Di Tancredi I Clorinda with Rolando Villazón et al. (2006, Virgin Classics)
- Handel, Il Trionfo del tempo e del disinganno with Natalie Dessay, Ann Hallenberg et al. (2007, Virgin Classics)
- Lamenti with Rolando Villazón, Natalie Dessay, Véronique Gens, Joyce DiDonato et al. (2008, Virgin Classics)
- Bach, Cantatas with Natalie Dessay (2008, Virgin Classics)
- Handel, Cleopatra with Natalie Dessay (2011, Virgin Classics)
- Une fête baroque with Natalie Dessay, Ann Hallenberg, Philippe Jaroussky, Rolando Villazón et al. (2012, Virgin Classics)
- Mozart, Mitridate, re di Ponto, Michael Spyres, Patricia Petibon, Myrtò Papatanasiu, Christophe Dumaux, Sabine Devieilhe, Cyrille Dubois, Jaël Azzaretti; Clément Hervieu-Léger (staging); Le Concert d'Astrée / Emmanuelle Haïm (dir.) (2017 Erato DVD)

== Awards and recognition ==
Emmanuelle Haïm became a Chevalier of the Legion of Honour in 2009, and is a Chevalier of the Ordre des Arts et des Lettres. In 2007, she was granted honorary membership of the Royal Academy of Music, London. In 2017, she was appointed Officier of the Ordre national du Mérite. She received the insignia on 19 June 2018.

=== Memberships ===
Haïm is foreign member of the Royal Swedish Academy of Music.
