= Charles Farncombe =

British operatic conductor (1919–2006)

- Born: July 29, 1919; London, U.K.
- Died: June 30, 2006 (aged 86)
- Occupation: Operatic conductor

Charles Farncombe (CBE) (July 29, 1919 – June 30, 2006) was a British operatic conductor. He specialized in conducting operas by George Frideric Handel, including Alcina and Rinaldo. He was honoured as a Commander of the British Empire (CBE) in 1977.
