= Le Concert d'Astrée =

Le Concert d'Astrée is an instrumental and vocal ensemble dedicated to the performance of Baroque music. It was founded In 2000 by Emmanuelle Haïm, and has been in residence at the Opéra de Lille since 2004 and has established an international reputation for the performance of the 17th and 18th century classical repertoire.

== Awards ==
Le Concert d'Astrée was voted "Best Ensemble of the Year" at the Victoires de la musique classique 2003 awards and won the "Alte Musik Ensemble" category at the Echo Deutscher Musikpreis awards in 2008.

== Discography ==
The ensemble has produced the following recordings:

- 2002: Arcadian Duets
- 2003: Aci, Galatea E Polifemo
- 2003: Dido And Aeneas
- 2005: Delirio
- 2006: Combattimento
- 2006: Mass in C, Mozart
- 2007: Il Trionfo Del Tempo E Del Disinganno, Handel
- 2007: Carestini - The Story Of A Castrato
- 2008: Lamenti
- 2008: Cantatas BWV 51, 82a & 199, Bach

== Funding ==
The Concert d'Astrée receives funding from the Hauts-de-France Regional Department of Cultural Affairs, the Département du Nord and Lille City Council.
