= Christopher Robson =

Scottish countertenor (born 1953)

Christopher Robson (/ˈrɔːbsən/; born 1953) is a Scottish countertenor.

Robson studied trumpet alongside voice early in his career. As a singer, he debuted in the English National Opera production of L'Orfeo in 1981. In 1984, Robson performed the role of the titular pharaoh in the US premiere of the Philip Glass opera Akhnaten with the Houston Grand Opera in 1984. In contrast to Paul Esswood's portrayal at the world premiere in Stuttgart, Robson appeared on stage in Houston in a convincingly nude bodystocking that speculated on androgynous ancient depictions of the pharaoh. Robson performed the role with the New York City Opera in the same year, and performed the role again the following year in the opera's British premiere with the English National Opera. In 1995, Robson performed the role of Arsamane in the Lyric Opera of Chicago's first production of Händel's Serse, and performed the role again in 1997 in Munich under the direction of Ivor Bolton.

Robson served on the jury for the ARD International Music Competition in 2024.
