= Nicola Francesco Haym =

Italian composer

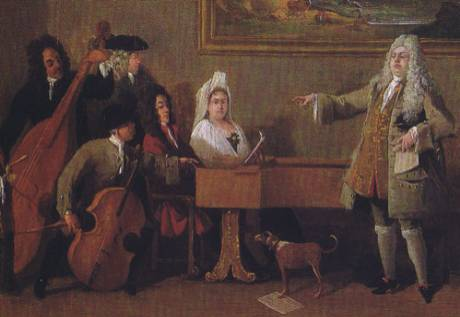
Marco Ricci's ca. 1709 painting of Nicola Francesco Haym at the harpsichord.

Nicola Francesco Haym (6 July 1678 – 31 July 1729) was an Italian opera librettist, composer, theatre manager and performer, literary editor and numismatist. He is best remembered for adapting texts into libretti for the London operas of George Frideric Handel and Giovanni Bononcini. Libretti that he provided for Handel included those for Giulio Cesare, Ottone, Flavio, Tamerlano, Rodelinda, and several others; for Bononcini, he produced two, Calfurnia and Astianatte.

== Compositions ==
Haym was born in Rome. His career began as a cellist in Italy, and he arrived in London in 1701: he swiftly became master of the 2nd Duke of Bedford's chamber music. He wrote the libretto for Bononcini's Camilla, a seminal work of enormous success that did much to establish Italian opera in London. Later, when operas in London came to be performed entirely in Italian, rather than in a bilingual blend of English and Italian, Haym spent much time adapting both libretti and music for the many pasticcios that were staged at this time.

Haym became the teacher and manager of the already successful soprano Joanna Maria Lindehleim negotiating a 100 guinea contract for ten performances in 1706. They would live together for the rest of their lives. In 1720, he was employed as a continuo cellist for the new Royal Academy of Music; in 1722, however, he became the Academy's Secretary for its final six seasons: he not only wrote the libretti but also took on the role of stage manager during this time. Prior to his death in London in 1729, he was planning to assist Handel and Heidegger in the construction of a new Academy after the demise of the old one.

== Publishing work ==
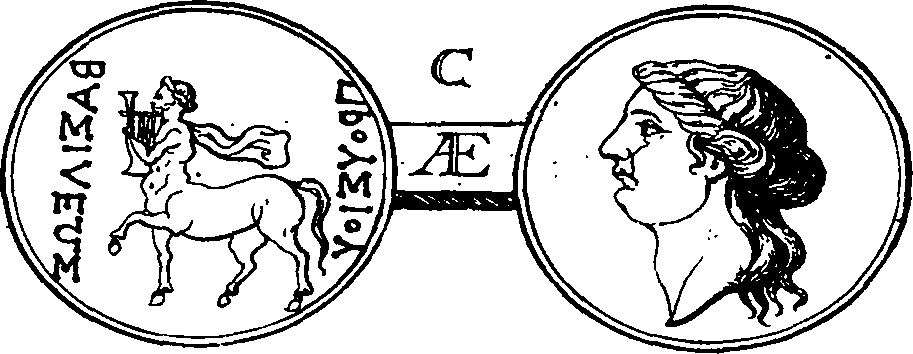
A drawing of publishers' fleurons by Haym.

Haym was a collector of paintings and engravings and made drawings himself. In 1719-29, Haym published a catalogue of ancient Greek and Roman coins and medals Del tesoro britannico parte prima, the first work on the ancient coins in the collection of the British Museum. This was illustrated with his own drawings. He was also the author of Biblioteca Italiana, o sia Notizia de' Libri Rari nella lingua Italiana, a bibliography of Italian books from the beginning of printing to about 1715. Published in London in 1726, and reprinted in Venice in 1728 and 1741, the work was originally intended to list only rare books. However, subsequent editors, beginning with Angelo Geremia, so enlarged the work that it came to be considered a general bibliography of Italian literature. It is arranged in sections, beginning with history and geography, then poetry, followed by prose writings, and a final extensive section on arts and sciences, including grammar, linguistics, history of art, philosophy, politics and political history, mathematics, and astronomy. The format of the cited books is given, in addition to some indication of rarity and advice on the best edition. A much enlarged edition was published in Milan, in 1771-72 by Federico Giandonati, and the work was the standard bibliography of Italian literature until the nineteenth century. It served as a model for Giuseppe Baretti's The Italian Library (London, 1757); some claimed that Baretti "pillaged" Haym's work.
