= John Nelson (conductor) =

American conductor (1941–2025)

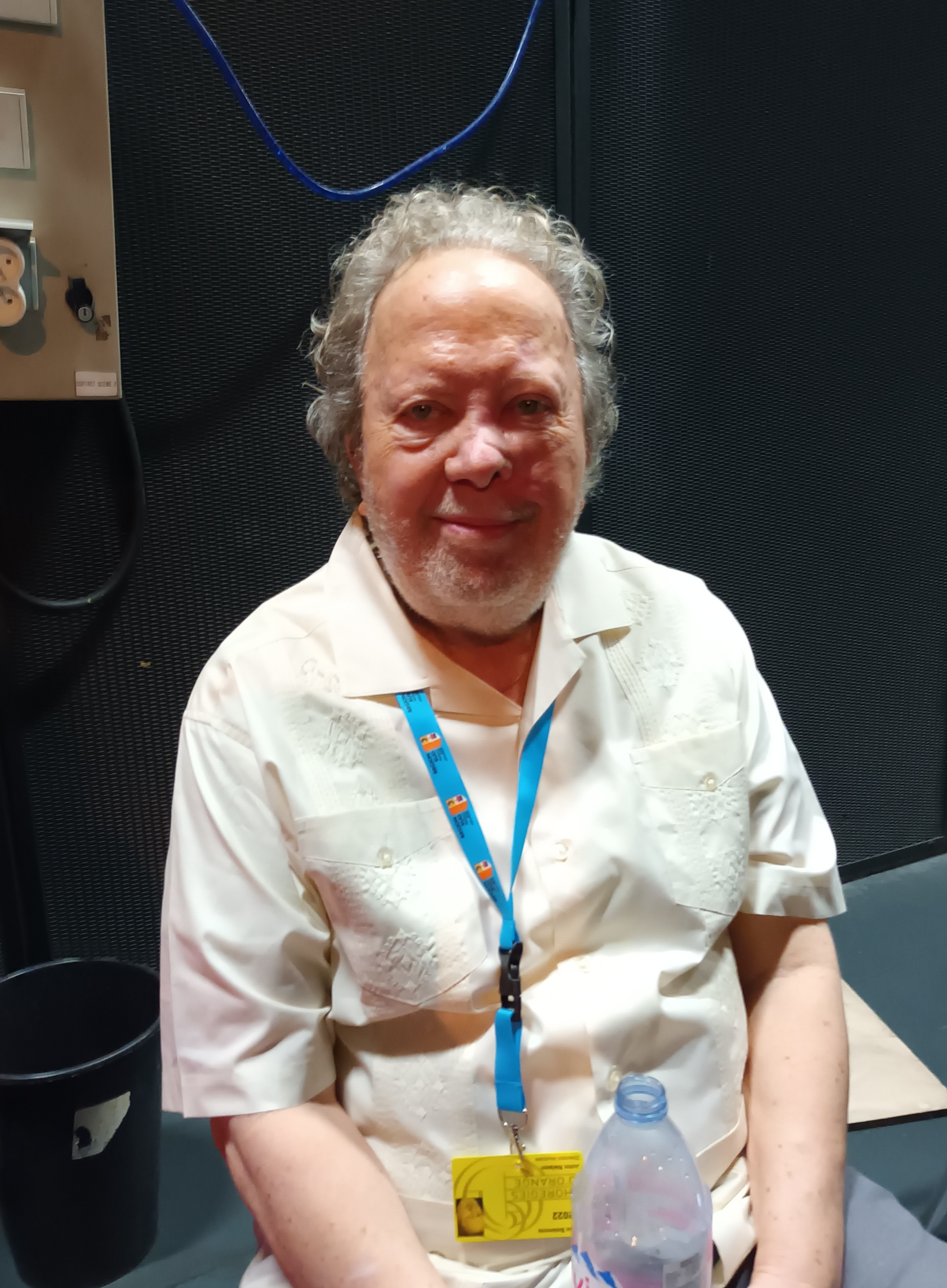

John Wilton Nelson (December 6, 1941 – March 31, 2025) was an American conductor known for his productions of the music of Hector Berlioz.

== Life and career ==
Nelson's parents were American Protestant missionaries. He studied at Wheaton College and later at the Juilliard School of Music with Jean Morel. Nelson was music director of the Greenwich Philharmonia in Connecticut and the New Jersey Pro Arte Chorale, and also served on the conducting staff of the Metropolitan Opera. In 1972, he conducted his New York City opera debut at Carnegie Hall in an uncut performance of Berlioz's Les Troyens. With the Metropolitan Opera, his professional opera conducting debut was also with Les Troyens, on one day's notice as an emergency substitute for Rafael Kubelík.

Nelson was music director of the Indianapolis Symphony Orchestra from 1976 to 1987, making commercial recordings there of music by Ellen Taaffe Zwilich and Charles Martin Loeffler for New World Records. With Opera Theatre of Saint Louis, he was music director from 1985 to 1988, and principal conductor from 1988 to 1991. He was also music director of the Caramoor Festival in Katonah, New York, from 1983 to 1990. In 1998, Nelson became music director of the Ensemble Orchestral de Paris (now renamed the Orchestre de chambre de Paris), a position he retained for ten years.

Nelson's interest in choral music led to his position as artistic director of Soli Deo Gloria.

Nelson and his wife Anita had two daughters. Anita Nelson died in October 2012. Nelson lived in Florida with his daughter, as well as in Costa Rica. He died on March 31, 2025, at the age of 83.

== Recordings ==
Among Nelson's recordings are several pieces by Hector Berlioz:

- George Frideric Handel: opera Semele; Kathleen Battle, Marilyn Horne, Samuel Ramey, John Aler, Sylvia McNair, Michael Chance, Ambrosian Opera Chorus, English Chamber Orchestra, CD Deutsche Grammophon, recorded at Abbey Road Studios, May 1-31, 1990
- Berlioz: opéra comique Béatrice et Bénédict; Susan Graham (Béatrice), Jean-Luc Viala (Bénédict), Philippe Magnant (Léonato), Sylvia McNair (Héro), Gabriel Bacquier (Somarone), Gilles Cachemaille (Claudio) and Catherine Robbin (Ursulle); Choeur et Orchestre de l’Opéra de Lyon, conducted by John Nelson, 2 CDs Erato, studio: Auditorium Ravel, Lyon, March 1-31, 1991
- Berlioz: Te Deum; Roberto Alagna, tenor, Marie-Claire Alain, organ, Choeur de l’Orchestre de Paris, Orchestre de Paris, conducted by John Nelson, CD Virgin Classics, studio: Maison de la Mutualité, Paris, Feb 19-20, 2000
- Berlioz: opera Benvenuto Cellini; Gregory Kunde (title role), Patrizia Ciofi (Teresa), Laurent Naouri (Balducci), Joyce DiDonato (Ascanio), Jean-François Lapointe (Fieramosca) and Renaud Délègue (Pope Clément); Choeur de Radio France, Orchestre National de France, conducted by John Nelson, 3 CD Erato, studio: Salle Messiaen, Maison de la Radio, Paris, Dec 8-13, 2003
- Johann Sebastian Bach: Mass in B minor; Ruth Ziesak, Joyce DiDonato, Daniel Taylor, Paul Agnew, Dietrich Henschel, Maîtrise Notre Dame de Paris, Ensemble Orchestral de Paris, conducted by John Nelson, DVD Virgin Classics 2006
- Berlioz: poème lyrique Les Troyens; Joyce DiDonato (Didon), Marie-Nicole Lemieux (Cassandre), Stéphane Degout (Chorèbe), Michael Spyres (Enée), Cyrille Dubois (Iopas), Mariane Crebassa (Ascagne) and Nicolas Courjal (Narbal); Choeurs de l’Opéra National du Rhin, Badischer Staatsopernchor, Orchestre Philharmonique de Strasbourg, conducted by John Nelson, 4 CD + 1 DVD Warner, awards: Diapason d’or and Choc de Classica, recorded live in Strasbourg, April 11-18, 2017
- Berlioz: Requiem; Michael Spyres, tenor, London Philharmonic Choir, Philharmonia Chorus, Philharmonia Orchestra, conducted by John Nelson, 1 CD + 1 DVD Erato, award: Choc de Classica, recorded in 2019
- Berlioz: légende dramatique La damnation de Faust; Michael Spyres (Faust), Joyce DiDonato (Marguerite), Nicolas Courjal (Méphistophélès) and Alexandre Duhamel (Brander), Les Petits Chanteurs de Strasbourg, Maîtrise de l’Opéra National du Rhin, Orchestre Philharmonique de Strasbourg, conducted by John Nelson, 2 CD + 1 DVD Warner Classics, award: Diapason d’or, recorded in 2019
- Camille Saint-Saëns: Cello Concerto No. 1; Édouard Lalo: Cello Concerto; Gabriel Fauré: Élégie; Léon Boëllmann: Variations symphoniques; Marc Coppey, cello, Orchestre Philharmonique de Strasbourg, conducted by John Nelson, CD Audite, recorded in 2021
- Berlioz: song cycle Les nuits d’été, Michael Spyres, tenor; Harold en Italie, Timothy Ridout, viola; Orchestre Philharmonique de Strasbourg, conducted by John Nelson, CD Erato, recorded in 2022
- Handel: sacred oratorio Messiah; Lucy Crowe, Alex Potter, Michael Spyres, Matthew Brook; The English Concert Choir, The English Concert (orchestra), conducted by John Nelson, 2 CDs + 1 DVD Erato, recorded and filmed live in Coventry Cathedral, November 1-30, 2022

Cultural offices
Preceded by Izler Solomon	Music director, Indianapolis Symphony Orchestra; 1976–1987	Succeeded by Raymond Leppard
Preceded by unknown	Music director and principal conductor, Opera Theatre of Saint Louis; 1985–1988 (music director), 1988–1991 (principal conductor)	Succeeded by Stephen Lord
