= Alfred de Wailly =

French classical philologist, lexicographer and high school teacher

Alfred de Wailly (10 December 1800, Paris – 1869, Paris) was a 19th-century French lexicographer He was professor of rhetoric and the headmaster of Lycée Napoléon (collège Henri IV), general inspector and finally rector of the Academy of Bordeaux. He is the author of Dictionnaires classiques, elegant verse translation of Callimaque and various poems.

He was the son of Étienne-Augustin De Wailly and the brother of Gustave and Jules de Wailly.

== Selected works ==
- 1826: Épître à J.-J. Rousseau Read online
- 1861: Nouveau dictionnaire latin-français Read online
- 1867: Nouveau dictionnaire de versification et de poésie latines Read online

He also translated several pieces from Latin such as Consolation à Marcia, Consolation à Polybius, De la brièveté de la vie, De la clémence, De la colère, all by Seneca.
