= Iphigénie en Tauride discography =

This is a discography of Iphigénie en Tauride, an opera by Christoph Willibald Gluck, first performed at the Paris Opéra on May 18, 1779.

== Audio ==
Year	Cast (following this order: Iphigénie, Thoas, Oreste, Pylade, First priestess, Second priestess, A Scythian, The temple minister, A Greek woman, Diane)	Conductor, Orchestra and Chorus	Label
1952	Patricia Neway, Robert Massard, Pierre Mollet, Léopold Simoneau, Arlette Roche; Ann-Marie Carpenter; Georges Abdoun; Robert Lamande; Simone Codinas; Micheline Rolle	Carlo Maria Giulini, Orchestra and chorus of the Conservatoire de Paris (live performance)	CD: MDV Classics Cat: [800]
1956	Hilde Zadek, Marcel Cordes, Hermann Prey, Nicolai Gedda, Brigitte Kaltwasser; Elly Volkenrath; Herbert Beil; Friedrich Himmelmann; Claire Breske; Ilse Wallenstein	Joseph Keilberth, Orchestra and chorus of the Westdeutscher Rundfunk (live performance in German)	CD: Capriccio Cat: C 5005
1957	Maria Callas, Anselmo Colzani, Dino Dondi, Francesco Albanese, Stefania Malagù; Eva Perotti; Franco Piva; Costantino Ego; Edith Martelli; Fiorenza Cossotto,	Nino Sanzogno, Orchestra and chorus of La Scala, Milan (live performance in Italian)	CD: Melodram Cat: CDM 2.6012; EMI Cat: 565 451-2; Divina Records Cat: DVN 11; Opera d'Oro Cat: OPD 1348; Myto «Historical» Cat: 00139
1961	Montserrat Caballé, Paul Schöffler, Raymond Wolansky, Jean Cox, Susana Matos; María Andrea Gaspar not stated (a Scythian); Walter Hagner; Maria Teresa Dinis Sampaio; Natália Viana	Antonio de Almeida, Chorus and orchestra of the Teatro Nacional de São Carlos, Lisbon (live performance of Richard Strauss' edition in German)	LP: Voce Cat: 31
1964	Régine Crespin, Victor De Narké; Robert Massard, Guy Chauvet, Carmen De La Mata; Africa De Retes; Gui Gallardo; Ricardo Yost; María Altamura; Marta Benegas	Georges Sébastian, Orchestra and chorus of the Teatro Colón, Buenos Aires (live performance)	CD: Le Chant du Monde Cat: LDC 278 769; Gala Cat: GL 100.595
1965	Sena Jurinac, Kieth Engen, Hermann Prey, Fritz Wunderlich, Marjorie Heistermann (only a priestess is stated); Karl Kreile not stated (the temple minister) not stated (a Greek woman); Antonia Fahberg	Rafael Kubelík, Bavarian Radio Symphony Orchestra & Chorus, Munich (live performance in German)	CD: Myto records Cat: 91544
1974	Marilyn Horne, Zoltán Kéléman, Richard Stilwell, Werner Hollweg, Gioia Antonini Calè; Benedetta Pecchioli; Robert Amis El Hage; Teodoro Rovetta; Mariana Nicolesco; Mariana Nicolesco	Henry Lewis, RAI Symphony Orchestra & Chorus, Turin (recording of a performance broadcast)	CD: Bella Voce Cat: BLV 107241
1983	Pilar Lorengar, Dietrich Fischer-Dieskau, Walton Grönroos, Franco Bonisolli, Alma Jean Smith; Susanne Klare; John Janssen; David Cumberland; Carmen Anhorn; Angelika Nowski	Lamberto Gardelli, Bavarian Radio Symphony Orchestra & Chorus, Munich	CD: Orfeo Cat: C 052833 H
1986	Diana Montague, René Massis; Thomas Allen, John Aler, Nancy Argenta; Sophie Boulin; René Schirrer; René Schirrer; Danièlle Borst; Colette Alliot-Lugaz	John Eliot Gardiner, Monteverdi Choir, Orchestra of the Opéra de Lyon	CD: Philips Cat: 416 148-2; PHCP 1392-3; 476 171-2; Decca «Originals» Cat.: 478 1705
1992	Carol Vaness, Giorgio Surian, Thomas Allen, Gösta Winbergh, Anna Zorobert; Michela Remor; Angelo Veccia; Enrico Turco; Svetla Krasteva; Sylvie Brunet	Riccardo Muti, Orchestra and chorus of La Scala, Milan (live performance)	CD: Sony Classics Cat: S2K 52 492; SM2K 90 463
1999	Mireille Delunsch, Laurent Naouri, Simon Keenlyside, Yann Beuron, Claire Delgado-Boge; Nicki Kennedy; Laurent Alvaro; Laurent Alvaro; Michelle Norman-Webb; Alexia Cousin	Marc Minkowski, Les Musiciens du Louvre, Choeur des Musiciens du Louvre, Paris (recorded live at Radio France Studios)	CD: Archiv Cat: 471 133-2
1999	Christine Goerke, Stephen Salters; Rodney Gilfry, Vinson Cole, Sharon Baker; Jayne West; Mark Andrew Cleveland; Mark Risinger; Sharon Baker; Jayne West	Martin Pearlman, Boston Baroque orchestra and chorus, Worcester (MA)	CD: Telarc Cat: DSD 805460
2000	Susan Graham, Philippe Rouillon, Thomas Hampson, Paul Groves, Christiane Kohl, Astrid Hofer, Patrick Arnaud, Walter Zeh, Elena Nebeera, Ol’ga Šalaeva	Ivor Bolton, Mozarteum Orchestra of Salzburg and Concert Association of the Vienna State Opera Chorus, Salzburg Festival (live performance at the Residenzhof)	CD: Orfeo Cat: C 563 012

== Video ==
Year	Cast (following this order: Iphigénie, Thoas, Oreste, Pylade, First priestess, Second priestess, A Scythian, The temple minister, A Greek woman, Diane)	Conductor, Orchestra and Chorus, Director	Label
2001	Juliette Galstian, Anton Scharinger, Rodney Gilfry, Deon van der Walt, Lisa Lorenz; Eleanor Paunovic; Michael Mrosek; Thomas Pütz; Anna Soranno, Martina Janková	William Christie, Zurich Opera's orchestra La Scintilla and chorus, Claus Guth	DVD: Arthaus Cat: 100 376; Kultur Cat: D 2939
2011	Susan Graham, Gordon Hawkins, Plácido Domingo, Paul Groves, Lei Xu, Cecelia Hall, David Won, not stated (temple minister), not stated (a Greek woman), Julie Boulianne	Patrick Summers, Metropolitan Opera, (live recording, February 26, 2011); Stephen Wadsworth	Streaming video in HD: Met Opera on Demand
2013	Mireille Delunsch, Laurent Alvaro, Jean-François Lapointe, Yann Beuron, Simone Riksman; Rosanne van Sandwijk; Peter Arink; Harry Teeuwen not stated (a Greek woman), Salomé Haller	Marc Minkowski, Les Musiciens du Louvre and Amsterdam De Nederlandse Opera's chorus, (live recording, September 2011, at Muziektheater, Amsterdam); Pierre Audi	DVD: Opus Arte Cat: BD7115 D
