= Jules de Wailly =

French playwright

- Born: Augustin Jules de Wailly; 12 September 1806; Paris, France
- Died: 12 July 1866 (aged 59); Paris, France
- Occupation: Playwright

Jules de Wailly (12 September 1806 – 12 July 1866), full name Augustin Jules de Wailly, was a 19th-century French playwright. He was Gustave and Léon de Wailly's brother.

The son of Étienne-Augustin de Wailly, and grandson of Noël François de Wailly, an official at the Interior Ministry (1840), his plays were presented on the most significant Parisian stages of the 19th century including the Théâtre des Variétés, the Comédie-Française, the Théâtre du Gymnase dramatique, and the Théâtre du Vaudeville.

== Works ==
- 1839: Le Comité de bienfaisance, comedy in 1 act, with Charles Duveyrier
- 1841: La Maschera, opéra comique in 2 acts
- 1843: Un Péché de jeunesse, comedy in 1 act, mingled with song, with Joseph Isidore Samson
- 1844: Le Mari à la campagne, comedy in 3 acts, with Jean-François-Alfred Bayard
- 1844: Un Amant malheureux, comédie-vaudeville in 2 acts
- 1845: Deux compagnons du tour de France, comédie-vaudeville in 2 acts, with Lockroy
- 1849: Elzéar Chalamel, ou Une assurance sur la vie, comédie-vaudeville in 3 acts, with Gustave de Wailly
- 1849: Moiroud et compagnie, comédie-vaudeville in 1 act, with Bayard
- 1850: Les Deux célibats, comedy in 3 acts, with Overnay
- 1850: Discours prononcé sur la tombe de M. Narjot, maire de Pantin
- 1850: La Famille du mari, comedy in 3 acts, mingled with songs, with Overnay
- 1851: Contre fortune bon cœur, comédie-vaudeville in 1 act, with Armand Joseph Overnay
- 1852: Les Premières armes de Blaveau, comédie-vaudeville in 1 act, with Gustave de Wailly
- 1854: Un Conte de fées, comédie-vaudeville in 2 acts, with Germain Delavigne
- 1854: Une Rencontre dans le Danube, opéra comique in 2 acts, with Delavigne, music by Paul Henrion
- 1873: Œuvres de MM. Alfred, Gustave et Jules de Wailly, Firmin-Didot, (posthumous)

== Bibliography ==
- Joseph Marie Quérard, La littérature française contemporaine: XIXe siècle, 1857, (p. 592)
- Haydn's Universal Index of Biography from the Creation to the Present Time, 1870, (p. 562)
