= Gregory Kunde =

American opera singer

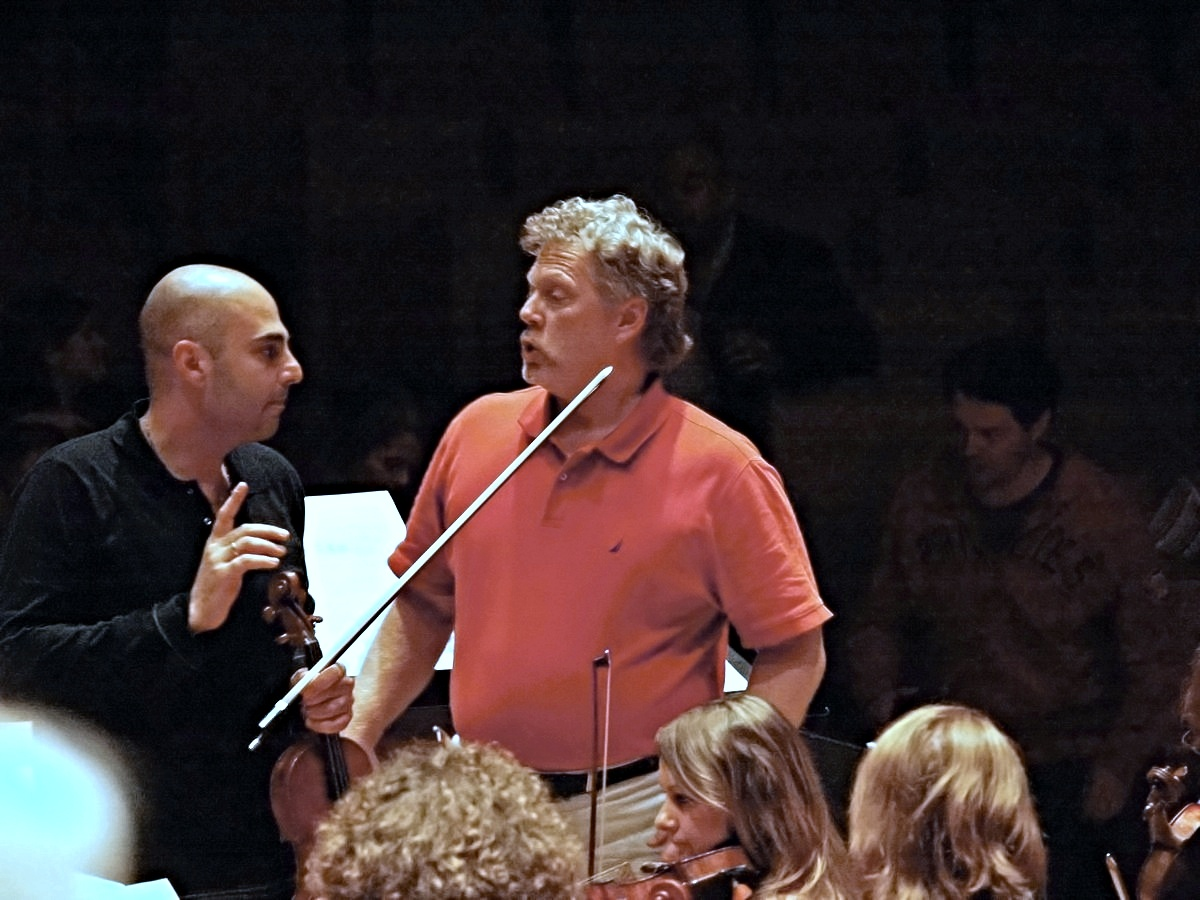
Gregory Kunde while staging the opera Vilém Tell G. Rossini, Valladolid 2010

Gregory Kunde (February 24, 1954, Kankakee, Illinois) is an American operatic tenor particularly associated with French and Italian repertoire. After singing the bel canto repertory of Donizetti, Bellini, and Rossini for more than 25 years, Kunde has turned primarily to the verismo roles of Verdi and Puccini. He has sung professionally for nearly 50 years.

== Career ==
Kunde studied choral conducting and voice at Illinois State University before making his professional debut in 1978 at the Lyric Opera of Chicago, as Cassio in Otello, later singing Prunier in La rondine, and Vanya in Katya Kabanova. He appeared at the Opéra de Montréal as Tybalt in Roméo et Juliette, and as Arturo in I puritani, opposite Luciana Serra, which revealed his affinity for the bel canto repertory and the extent of his upper register, reaching a high F (above the tenor high C) in falsettone. He made his debut at the Metropolitan Opera in New York as the understudy for the role of des Grieux in Massenet's Manon opposite soprano Catherine Malfitano in 1987, replacing the indisposed Dénes Gulyás for one performance. He next returned to the Metropolitan Opera in 2000, again stepping in for an indisposed colleague for one performance of Rossini's La cenerentola. In 2006 he again replaced an ill colleague for the Met's production of Bellini's I puritani opposite soprano Anna Netrebko, and most recently in 2019 for their production of Saint-Saën's Samson et Dalila, a series of performances with which he received critical acclaim.

In Europe Kunde has performed Les Huguenots, A Life for the Tsar, Anna Bolena, at the Pesaro Festival in 1992 as Idreno in Semiramide, and in 1993 as Rinaldo in Armida opposite Renée Fleming.

Kunde's debut as Verdi’s Otello opened the season in 2012 at Venice’s La Fenice. He has since performed the role in more than thirty venues worldwide. He is the only tenor to have performed the roles of Rossini’s Otello and Verdi’s Otello in the same season, doing so in 2012 and in 2015. His other roles have included Andrea Chénier, Calaf in Puccini’s Turandot, Énée in Berlioz’s Les Troyens, Peter Grimes, Samson in Saint-Saëns’s Samson et Dalila, Jean de Leyde of Meyerbeer’s Le prophète, des Grieux in Manon Lescaut of Puccini, Mitridate, re di Ponto, Rodrigo in La donna del lago, Arnold in Guillaume Tell, Ernesto in Don Pasquale, Nadir in Les pêcheurs de perles, Roméo in Roméo et Juliette, and Enée in Les Troyens.

Kunde's recordings include Benvenuto Cellini and Gérald in Lakmé, opposite Natalie Dessay.

He resides in Rochester, New York, with his wife Linda, and his daughter Isabella.

== Selected recordings ==
Hector Berlioz, Benvenuto Cellini, Gregory Kunde, Benvenuto Cellini, Patrizia Ciofi, Teresa, Laurent Naouri, Balducci, Joyce DiDonato, Ascanio, Jean-François Lapointe, Fieramosca, Renaud Délègue, Le Pape Clément VII, Choeur de Radio France, Orchestre National de France, conducted by John Nelson, 3 CD Erato Warner classics 2004

== Sources ==
- Guide de l'opéra, Roland Mancini & Jean-Jacques Rouveroux, (Fayard, 1995) ISBN 2-213-59567-4
