= Benvenuto Cellini (opera) =

1836 opera by Hector Berlioz

- Opera semiseria by Hector Berlioz
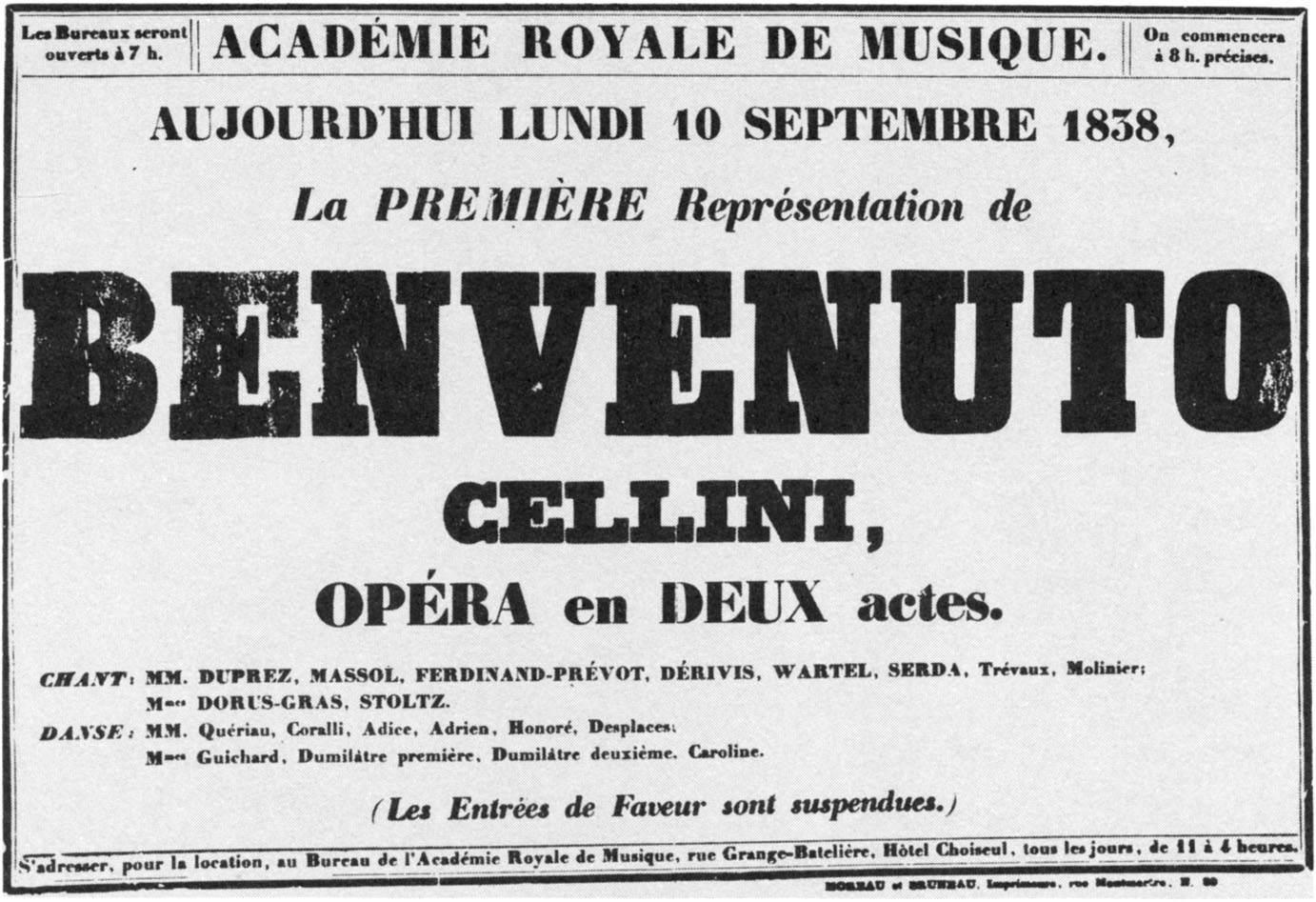
- Poster for the premiere
- Librettist: Léon de Wailly; Henri Auguste Barbier
- Language: French
- Based on: Benvenuto Cellini
- Premiere: 10 September 1838; Salle Le Peletier, Paris

Benvenuto Cellini is an opera semiseria in four tableaux (spread across two or three acts) by Hector Berlioz, his first full-length work for the stage. Premiered at the Académie Royale de Musique (Salle Le Peletier) on 10 September 1838, it is a setting of a libretto by Léon de Wailly and Henri Auguste Barbier, who invented most of the plot inspired by the memoirs of the Florentine sculptor Benvenuto Cellini. The opera is technically challenging and was until the 21st century rarely performed. However, the overture occasionally features in orchestral concerts, as does the concert overture Le carnaval romain which Berlioz composed from material in the opera.

== Composition history ==
Berlioz wrote this in his Mémoires about the background to the opera:

I had been greatly struck by certain episodes in the life of Benvenuto Cellini. I had the misfortune to believe they would make an interesting and dramatic subject for an opera, and I asked Léon de Wailly and Auguste Barbier … to write a libretto around them.

The only plot element drawn directly from Cellini's memoirs concerns the casting of his famous statue of Perseus with the Head of Medusa for Duke Cosimo I de' Medici, although this was done in Florence, where it still stands in the Loggia dei Lanzi, not in Rome, as the opera has it. All the opera's characters besides Cellini and Pope Clement VII, who is made commissioner of the statue in place of Cosimo, and all other episodes, are invented.

The original libretto, which is lost, seems to have been in the format of an opéra comique; it was rejected by the Paris Opéra-Comique company. The story was then reworked as an opéra semiseria, without spoken dialogue, and offered to the Paris Opéra where it was accepted in 1835 by that company's new director, Henri Duponchel. Actual composition started in 1836. Its completion date is unknown. Several Berlioz scholars say it was completed that same year before the composer turned his attention to his massive Grande messe des morts in 1837. In any event, its premiere was scheduled for June 1838, postponed, and finally given at the Opéra on 10 September 1838, conducted by François Habeneck and with Gilbert Duprez in the title role. It is likely the composer continued work on the score, or at least made revisions to it, during 1838 after the Grande messe was completed.

== Premiere and revisions ==
At the premiere, with costumes by Paul Lormier and sets by René-Humanité Philastre and Charles-Antoine Cambon, the audience hissed most of the music after the first few numbers. In 1851, Franz Liszt offered to revive the opera in a new production in Weimar, suggesting changes to the score to Berlioz. A new version was in fact prepared and performed in Weimar the next year, its title role being sung by Karl Beck, the same tenor who had originated Wagner's Lohengrin in 1850, also under Liszt, and whose vocal powers were continuing to exhibit the same decline as was apparent two years earlier. Benvenuto Cellini was performed in London in 1853 as well, but was again poorly received. Its last performances in Berlioz's lifetime were in Weimar in 1856, this time without Beck, who had retired.

== Versions ==
In 1856 the vocal score of the Weimar version was published in Germany; Choudens in 1863 issued a French edition of the same. Thomasin La May has examined the Weimar version of the opera. In 1996 a critical edition of the opera by Hugh Macdonald was published by Bärenreiter Verlag as part of the New Berlioz Edition, taking into account all three versions because the composer himself was involved in all three:

- the original version as Berlioz composed it ("Paris 1") before changes demanded by the censors; this is favored today
- the opera as premiered in 1838 ("Paris 2") after changes imposed by the censors; this has no use today
- the version of the 1850s ("Weimar") reflecting changes suggested by Liszt; this has three acts, is still in use, and is the basis in many reference works about the opera

== Performance history ==
After Berlioz's death occasional performances took place — in Hanover in 1879, Vienna in 1911, and as part of the inaugural season at the Théâtre des Champs-Élysées, for six performances from 31 March 1913 conducted by Felix Weingartner. Following Les Troyens in 1935, the Glasgow Grand Opera Society mounted Benvenuto Cellini the next year alongside a production of Béatrice et Bénédict; Erik Chisholm conducted. The opera was revived in Vienna in 1952, where it was recorded. Four years later the Carl Rosa Opera Company, a British touring entity, brought it into its repertoire, giving two performances to packed houses at London's Sadler's Wells Theatre in 1957; the title role was sung by Charles Craig, then at the start of his career. Conductor Antal Doráti led the work in London in 1963 with Richard Lewis and Joan Carlyle, and again a recording was made. The Royal Opera House did not stage Benvenuto Cellini until December 15, 1966, when Gedda sang the lead. The opera had its Swiss premiere in Geneva in 1964, and its first Italian performances in 1967, in Naples.

After the first studio recording was made in July 1972, by Philips in Brent Town Hall, London, using an early two-act edition, interest in the opera grew. The first American production came in 1975 from the Opera Company of Boston under the musical direction of Sarah Caldwell, with Jon Vickers in the title role and John Reardon as Fieramosca. Stagings were mounted in Rome (1973 and 1995), Lyon (1982) and Florence (1987), among others.

The opera's appearance in the New Berlioz Edition in the late 1990s added to its acceptance. Indeed in the 21st century it has become a repertory work, with new productions and recordings in London and Amsterdam (1999), Berlin, Paris and New York (2003), and London, Stockholm and Salzburg (2007). It was performed in 2002 by University College Opera, an amateur student orchestra and chorus specialising in UK premieres and rarely heard operas. Those New York performances, eight of them, were the first at the Metropolitan Opera, with James Levine conducting an Andrei Șerban staging and Marcello Giordani as Cellini. The Salzburg production was conducted by Valery Gergiev and filmed. A production directed by Terry Gilliam, with the libretto in an English translation by Charles Hart, was premiered by English National Opera on 5 June 2014 with Michael Spyres in the title role and Edward Gardner conducting. Mark Elder led a staging in Amsterdam the next year, which was also filmed; John Osborn sang Cellini. Osborn again sang the role in Rome in 2016. Most recently a 2019 production in the Château de Versailles conducted by John Eliot Gardiner has been released on DVD, with Spyres as the sculptor.

== Roles ==
Roles, voice types, premiere cast
Role	Voice type	Premiere cast, 10 September 1838 Conductor: François Habeneck
Teresa, daughter of Balducci	soprano	Julie Dorus-Gras
Ascanio, Cellini’s apprentice and possibly son	mezzo-soprano	Rosine Stoltz
Benvenuto Cellini, artist, sculptor, goldsmith	tenor	Gilbert Duprez
Balducci, the Pope's treasurer and Teresa's father	baritone	Prosper Dérivis
Fieramosca, the Pope's sculptor	baritone	Jean-Étienne-Auguste Massol
Pope Clement VII	bass	Jacques-Émile Serda
Francesco, artisan	tenor	François Wartel
Bernardino, artisan	bass	Ferdinand Prévôt
tavern-keeper	tenor	H.-M. Trévaux
Pompeo, friend of Fieramosca	baritone	Molinier
Columbine	spoken	
Chorus: maskers, neighbours, metal-workers, friends and apprentices of Cellini, troupers, dancers, people, guards, white friars, the Pope's retinue, foundrymen, workmen, spectators

== Costumes ==
The costumes for the original production in 1838 were designed by Paul Lormier (1813–1895).

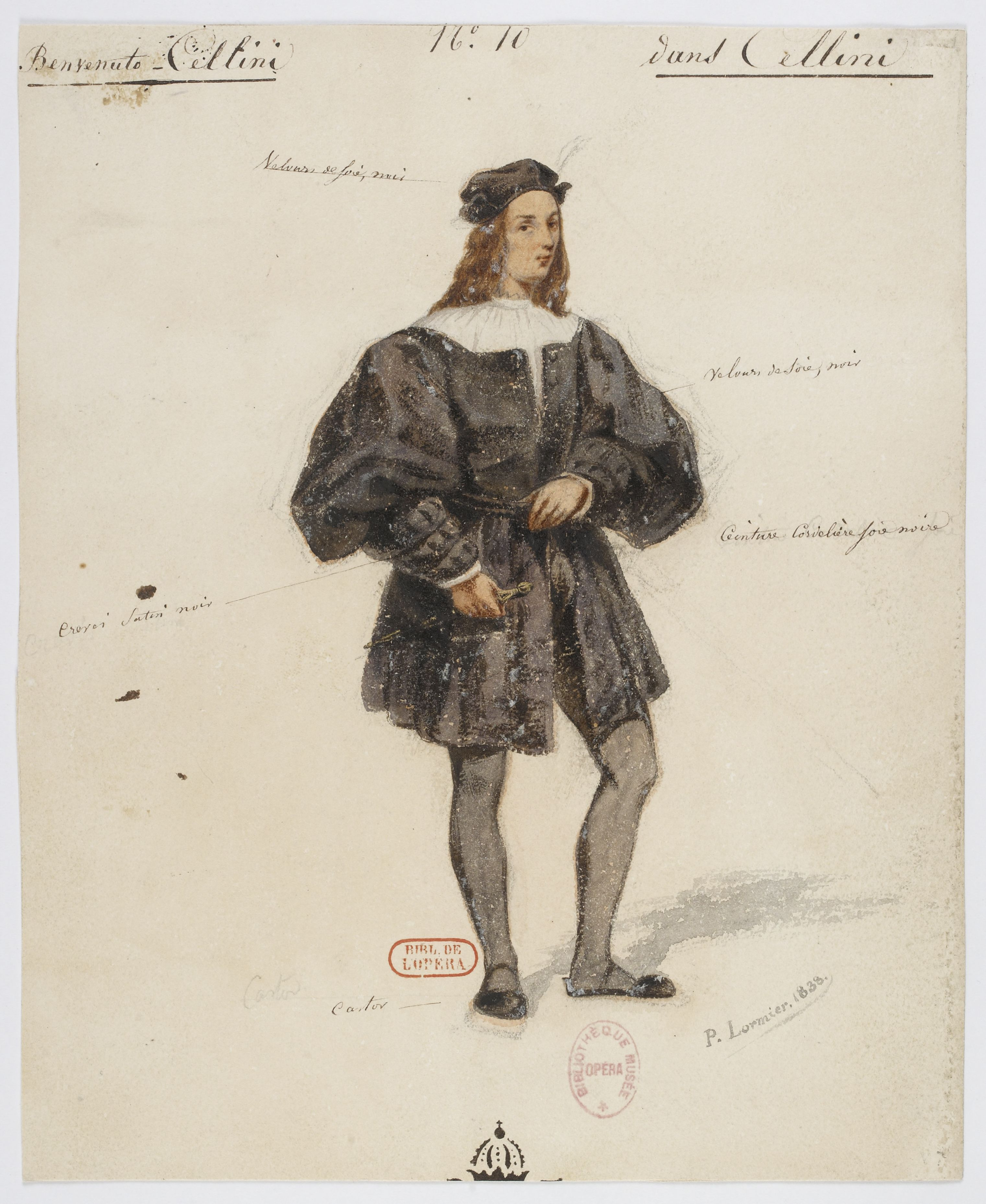
Cellini (Duprez)

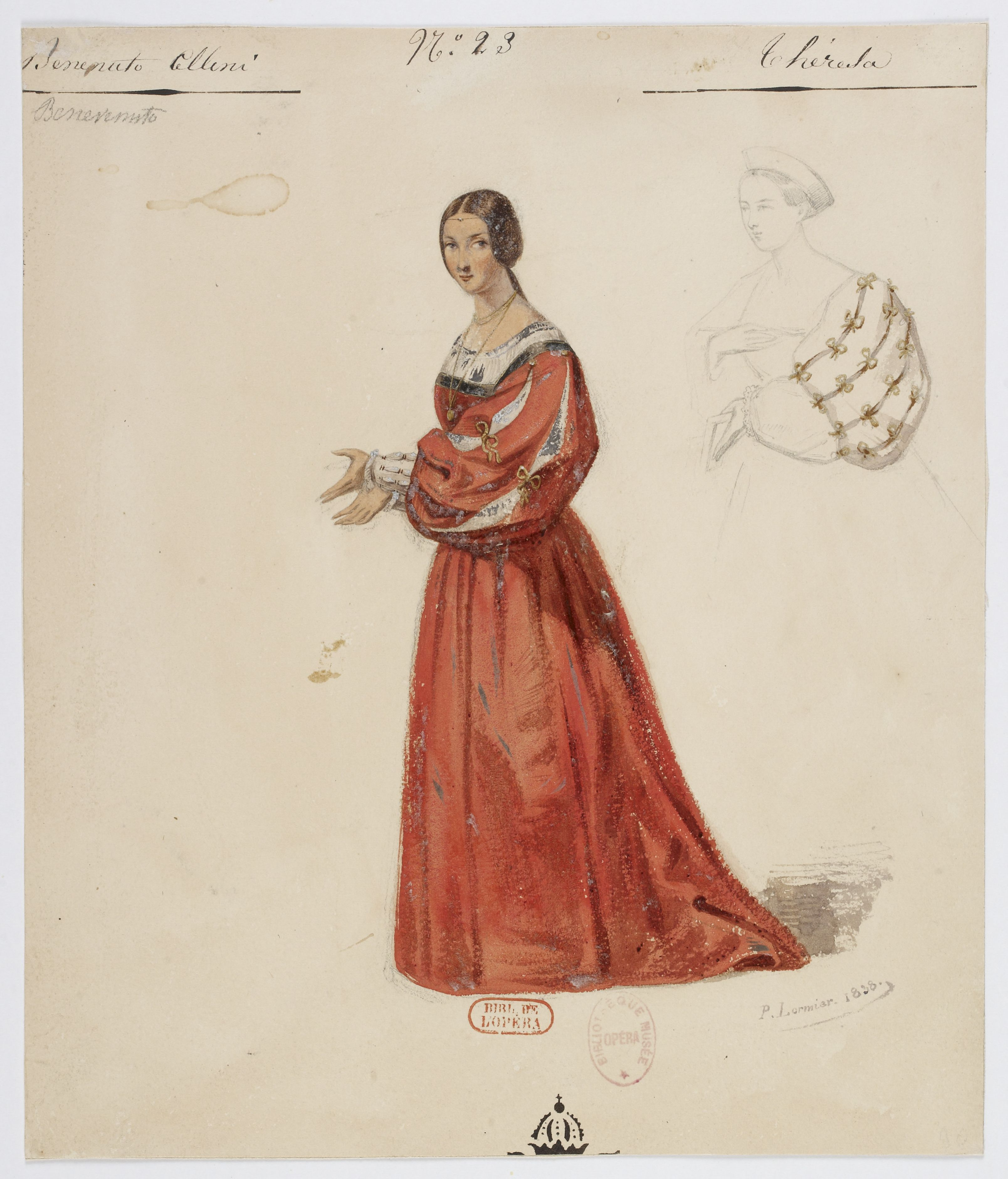
Teresa (Dorus-Gras)

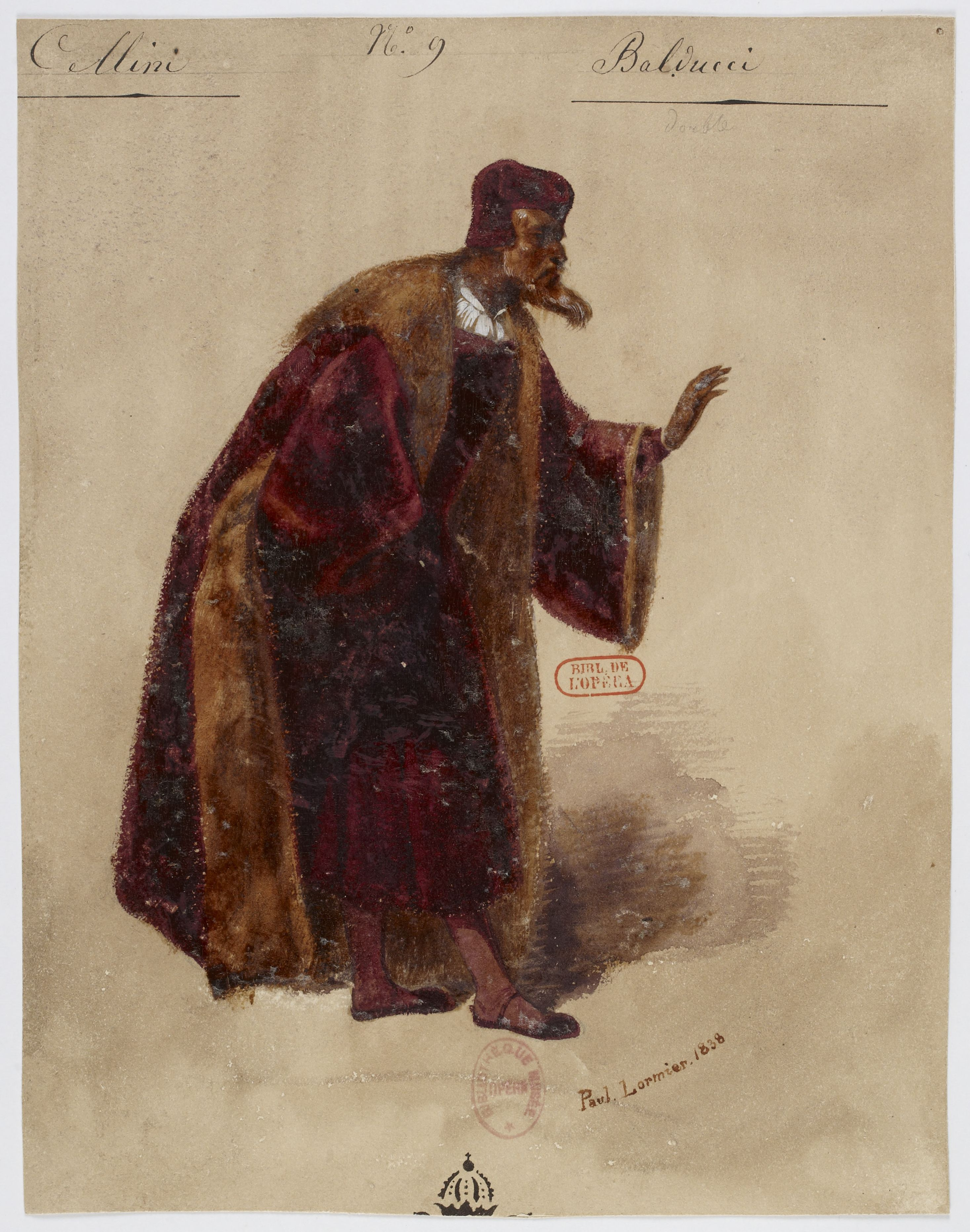
Balducci (Dérivis)

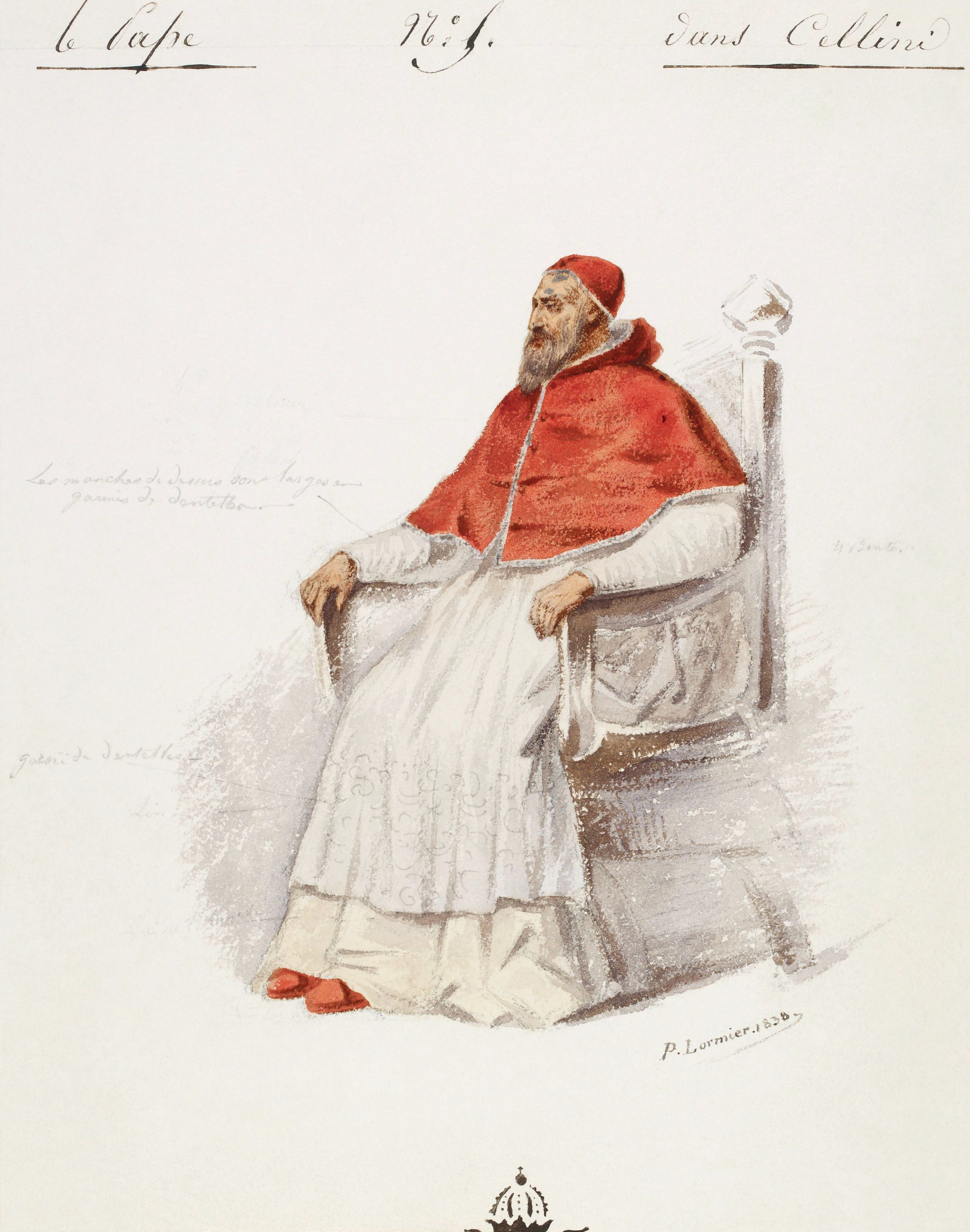
The Pope (Serda)

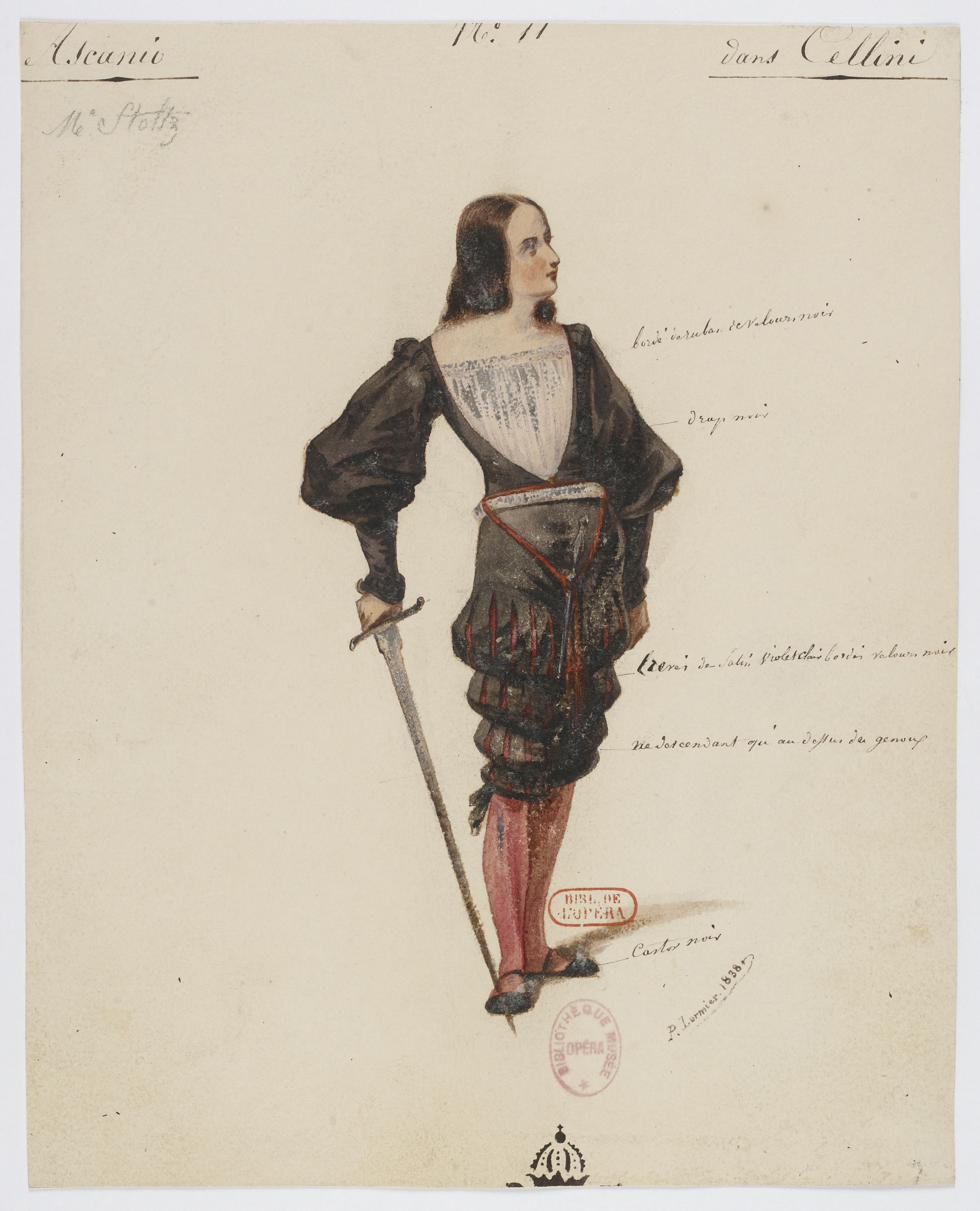
Ascanio (Stoltz)

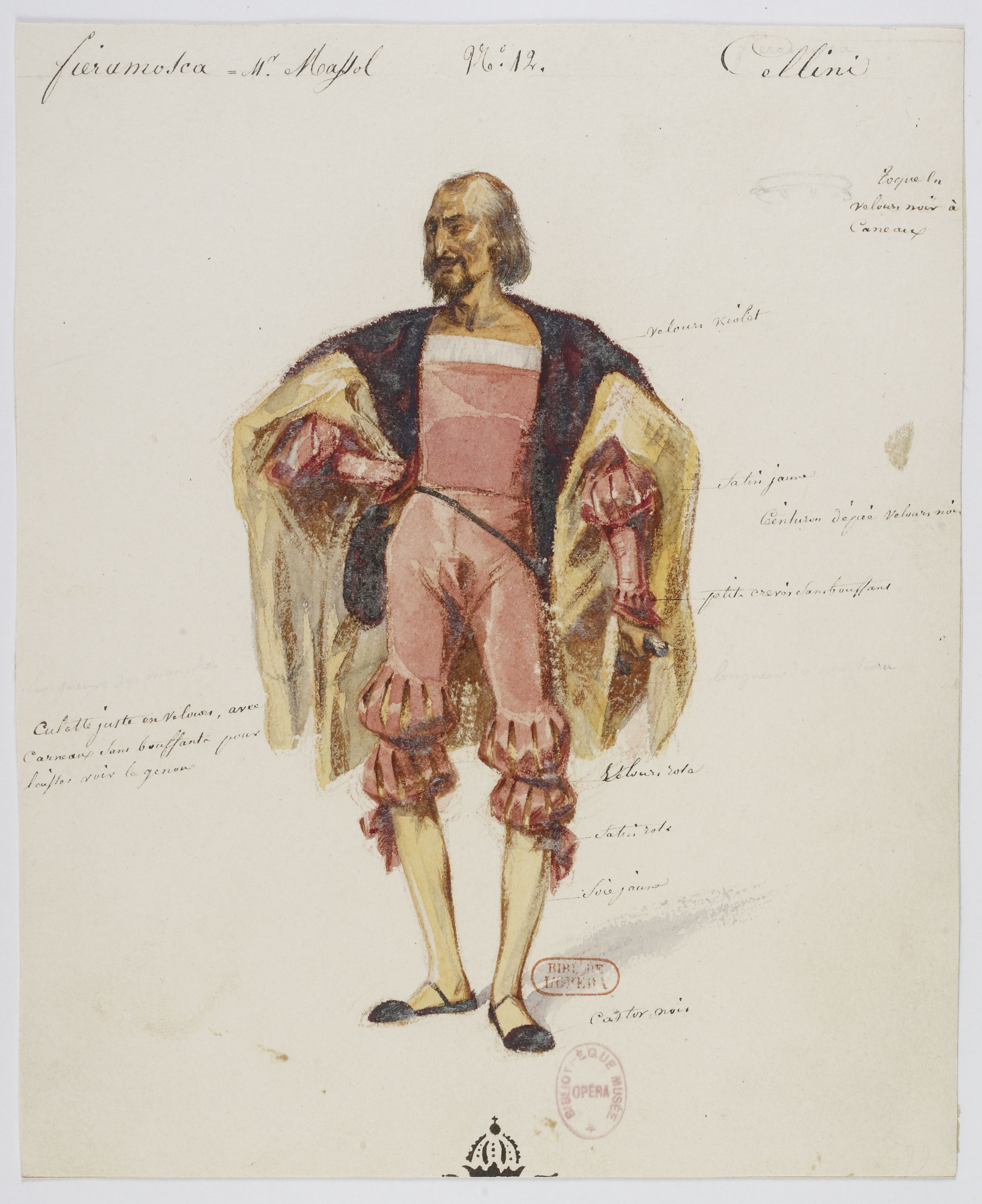
Fieramosca (Massol)

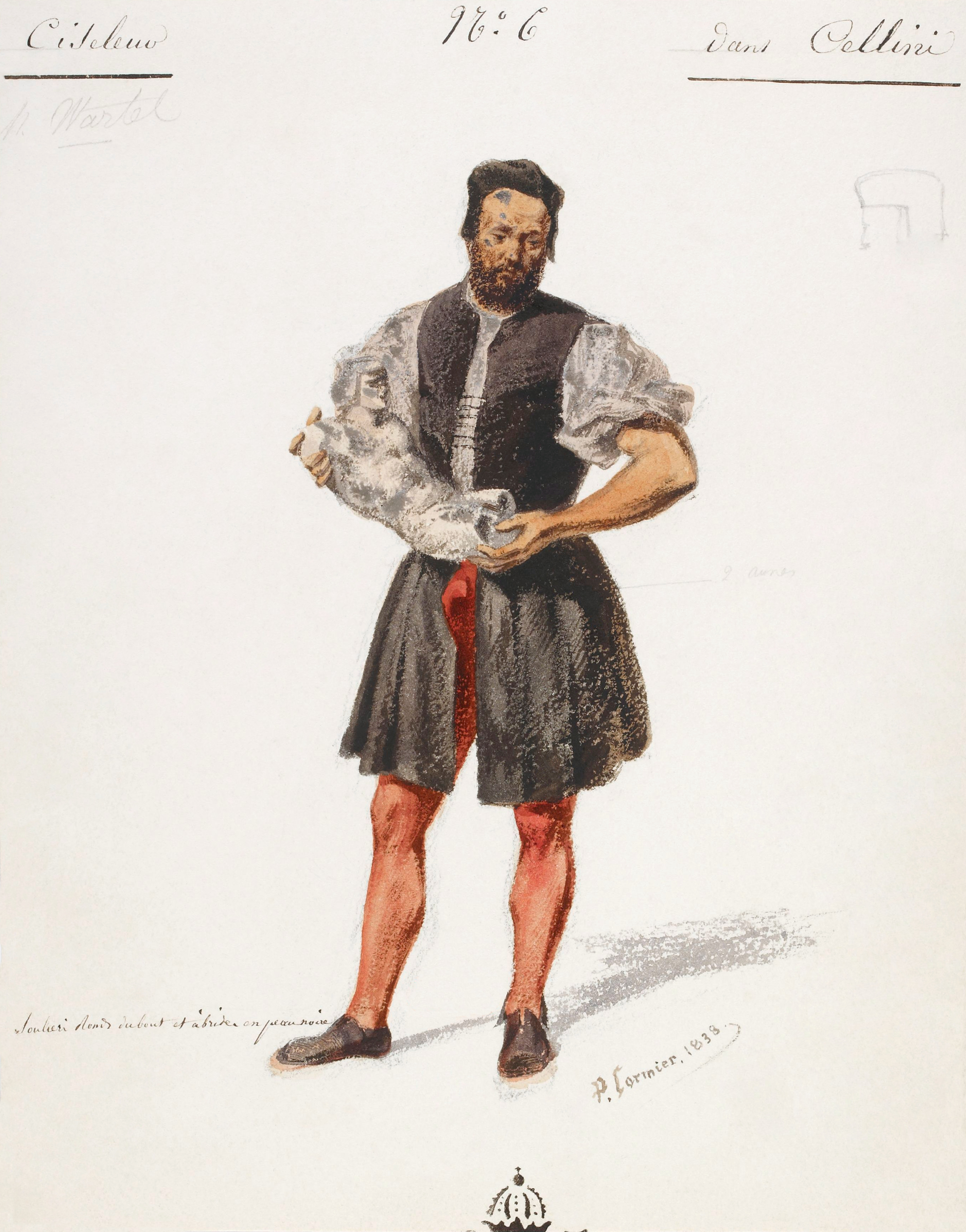
Francesco (Wartel)

== Synopsis ==
Overture
Arrangement for wind band, played by the U.S. Marine Band in 1991. (10:02)

Time: three consecutive days in 1532, specifically the evening of Shrove Monday, the evening of Mardi Gras, dawn of Ash Wednesday and evening of Ash Wednesday, for the four Tableaux, respectively.
Place: Rome.
Structure: the Tableaux are numbered independently in the New Berlioz Edition; Tableaux I and II correspond to Act I while III and IV comprise Act II; in the Weimar version, which reflects changes suggested by Liszt and is the basis in many reference works about the opera, Tableaux I is Act I, Tableaux II is Act II, and Tableaux III and IV, with chunks removed, are termed Act III.

=== Tableau I (Balducci's residence) ===
Balducci has been summoned to a meeting with Pope Clement VII concerning the commission of a bronze statue of Perseus from the sculptor Benvenuto Cellini. Balducci would have preferred Fieramosca as the chosen sculptor; he also hopes to marry his daughter Teresa to Fieramosca. But Teresa is smitten with Cellini. Before Balducci goes to his meeting with the Pope, Cellini and other Carnival celebrators come on the scene, and pelt Balducci with fausses dragées (flour pellets) that make him look "like a leopard". He can't clean himself off, however, so he continues to his meeting.

A bouquet of flowers comes through the window and lands at Teresa's feet. Attached is a note from Cellini saying that he is coming up. He does so, and explains his plan to take her away from her father so that they can live together. He and his assistant Ascanio will be disguised as monks, and will take her from her father during the Mardi Gras celebrations, when the Castel Sant'Angelo cannon is sounded to mark the end of Carnival. Unbeknownst to them both, Fieramosca has also entered the room, and overhears the plan.

Upon hearing Balducci approach, Fieramosca hides in Teresa's bedroom, and Cellini hides behind the main room door. To distract her father, Teresa invents a story about a noise in her bedroom. Balducci goes to investigate, and Cellini escapes. To Teresa's surprise, Balducci produces Fieramosca from the bedroom. He and Teresa call on the servants and neighbors to take Fieramosca and dump him outside in the fountain, but Fieramosca breaks free of the crowd.

=== Tableau II (a tavern, and then Piazza Colonna) ===
Cellini, his apprentices and friends sing the praises of being goldsmiths. Bernardino asks for more wine, but the innkeeper demands settlement of their tab. Ascanio then appears with the Pope's advance payment for the Perseus statue, but also with a warning that the casting of the statue must occur the next day. The amount of money in the advance is less than expected, which gives new impetus to the plan to mock Balducci at Cassandro's booth that night.

Fieramosca has also overheard this plan, and confides to his friend Pompeo. Pompeo suggests that they too disguise themselves as monks and abduct Teresa themselves.

People gather in the piazza. A crowd assembles at Cassandro's booth, where "the pantomime-opera of King Midas or The Ass's Ears" is unfurled. Balducci and Teresa enter, soon after Cellini and Ascanio dressed as monks, and then Fieramosca and Pompeo similarly disguised. In the pantomime, Harlequin and Pierrot compete for the attention of King Midas, who is attired to look like Balducci. At this, the real Balducci approaches the stage, leaving Teresa alone. Both sets of "friars" then approach Teresa, to her confusion. The four friars begin to battle by sword, and in the struggle, Cellini fatally stabs Pompeo. The crowd becomes silent, and Cellini is arrested for murder. As he is about to be taken away, the three cannon shots from Castel Sant'Angelo are heard, indicating the end of Carnival and the start of Lent. All of the lights in the piazza are extinguished. During the darkness and resulting confusion, Cellini escapes his captors and Ascanio and Teresa go off. Fieramosca is then mistakenly arrested in Cellini's place.

=== Tableau III (Cellini's studio) ===
Ascanio and Teresa wait for Cellini in his studio. When a procession of friars passes by, they join in the prayer. Cellini then enters, still in monk's disguise, and recounts his escape. Because he is now wanted for murder, he plans to escape Rome with Teresa, but Ascanio reminds him of his obligation to cast the statue. Ascanio goes off to find a horse. Balducci and Fieramosca then appear. Balducci denounces Cellini as a murderer and then promises Teresa to Fieramosca in marriage.

The Pope then appears to check on the progress of the statue. Cellini makes excuses, but the Pope dismisses them and decides that he will give the commission to another sculptor. Cellini then threatens to destroy the mould, and when the Pope's guards approach him, he raises his hammer. The Pope then makes Cellini an offer: if Cellini can cast the statue that evening, he will forgive Cellini's crimes and let him marry Teresa. But if Cellini fails, he will be hanged.

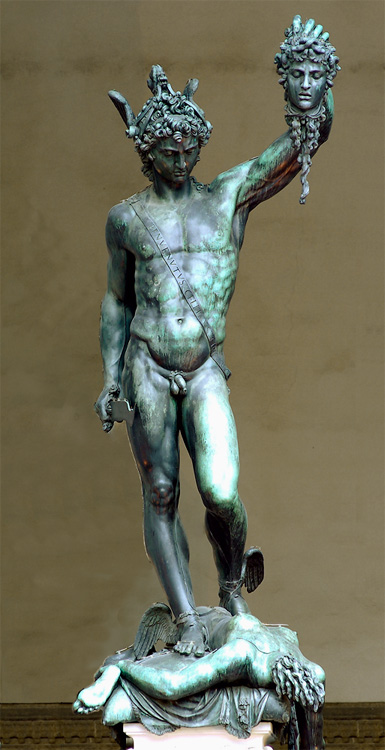
Bronze sculpture by Benvenuto Cellini

=== Tableau IV (The foundry) ===
After an aria from Ascanio, Cellini comes on stage and muses, in a 6/8 air, on the quiet life of a shepherd. The foundry's smithies (fondeurs) sing a sea-shanty, which Cellini sees as a bad omen. Ascanio and Cellini encourage them to continue their work. Fieramosca arrives with henchmen and challenges Cellini to a duel, which Cellini accepts asking to settle it on the spot. But Fieramosca wants it settled elsewhere. Cellini agrees. Fieramosca and his men leave.

Teresa arrives to see Ascanio handing Cellini his rapier. Cellini assures her he will be safe, and leaves. Alone, she hears the smithies start to lay down their tools, as they have not been paid and lack direction from Cellini. She tries to assure them they will be paid eventually, but to no avail. Fieramosca enters. Teresa faints, thinking Cellini dead. This is not so, as Fieramosca is about to offer a bribe to the smithies to cease work completely. But this turns the smithies against him, and they reassert their loyalty to Cellini, who reappears and, together with the smithies, recruits Fieramosca to help in the work.

In the evening the Pope and Balducci enter to learn whether the statue has been completed. Fieramosca announces that they are out of metal, which Francesco and Bernardino confirm. Cellini then prays. In a sudden act he orders all works from his studio, of whatever metal, to be smelted and reused for the Perseus, much to the consternation of Francesco and Bernardino. Moments later an explosion bursts the casting and the splendid new Perseus is revealed. All acknowledge Cellini's success, and the Pope pardons him as promised. Cellini and Teresa are united. The opera closes with a chorus of praise for the smithies.

== Recordings ==
Altogether there are at least 23 complete recordings in commercial release as of 2022, six of them videos, including the following:

- Wallhall Eternity series CD-9737514: Edith Kermer (Teresa), Fritz Uhl (Cellini), Otto Wiener (Fieramosca), Leo Heppe, Grosses Wiener Rundfunkorchester, conducted by Kurt Tenner. (sung in german) 1952
- Music & Arts CD-618: Richard Lewis, (Cellini), Joan Carlyle (Teresa), Josephine Veasey, Ascanio, Don Garrard (Balducci), John Cameron (Fieramosca), David Ward (Cardinal Salviati), Richard Lewis, Ranken Bushby (Pompeo), John Kentish, innkeeper; BBC Symphony Orchestra and Chorus, Antal Doráti, live concert performance, Royal Festival Hall, London, 23.1.1963; reviews on 24.1.1963 by The Times, Evening Standard, Daily Express, Daily Telegraph
- Gala GL 100 618: Nicolai Gedda (Benvenuto Cellini), Elizabeth Vaughan (Teresa), Robert Massard (Fieramosca), Yvonne Minton (Ascanio), John Dobson (Francesco), Napoléon Bisson (Balducci), Victor Godfrey (Bernardino), David Ward (Cardinal), Jules Bruyère (Pompeo); Covent Garden; John Pritchard, conductor. 1966.
- Philips 416-955-2: Nicolai Gedda (Benvenuto Cellini), Christiane Eda-Pierre (Teresa), Jane Berbié (Ascanio), Jules Bastin (Balducci), Robert Massard (Fieramosca), Roger Soyer (Pope Clement VII), Derek Blackwell (Francesco), Robert Lloyd (Bernardino), Raimund Herincx (Pompeo), Hugues Cuénod (Le cabaretier), Janine Reiss (Colombine; speaking role); Chorus of the Royal Opera House, Covent Garden; BBC Symphony Orchestra; Colin Davis, conductor (Grammy Award for Best Opera Recording of 1973)
- Allegro Opera d'Oro OPD-1373 (Weimar Edition): Franco Bonisolli (Benvenuto Cellini), Teresa Żylis-Gara (Teresa), Wolfgang Brendel (Fieramosca), Elizabeth Steiner (Ascanio), Gino Sinimberghi (Francesco), Pierre Thau (Balducci), James Loomis (Bernardino), Robert Amis El Hage (Cardinal), Tommaso Frascati (Pompeo); RAI Orchestra and Chorus; Seiji Ozawa, conductor. 1973.
- VAI Audio 1214-2: Jon Vickers (Benvenuto Cellini), Patricia Wells (Teresa), John Reardon (Fieramosca), Nancy Williams (Ascanio), Joey Evans (Francesco), Gimi Beni (Balducci), Ralph Griffin (Bernardino), Donald Gramm (Cardinal), Ralph Griffin (Pompeo); The Opera Company of Boston; Sarah Caldwell, conductor. 1975
- Virgin Classics 7243 5 45706 2 9 (using the New Berlioz Edition): Gregory Kunde (Benvenuto Cellini), Patrizia Ciofi (Teresa), Joyce DiDonato (Ascanio), Laurent Naouri (Balducci), Jean-François Lapointe (Fieramosca), Renaud Delaigue (Pope Clement VII), Eric Salha(Francesco), Marc Mauillon (Bernardino), Roman Nédélec (Pompeo), Éric Huchet (Le cabaretier); Chorus of Radio France; Orchestre National de France; John Nelson, conductor. 2003.
- Hänssler Classic 093.105.000 (Weimar Edition): Bruce Ford (Benvenuto Cellini), Laura Claycomb (Teresa), Monica Groop (Ascanio), Franz Hawlata (Balducci), Christopher Maltman (Fieramosca); MDR Rundfunkchor (Leipzig); Stuttgart Radio Symphony Orchestra; Roger Norrington, conductor 2006.
- LSO Live LSO0623: Gregory Kunde (Benvenuto Cellini), Laura Claycomb (Teresa), Isabelle Cals (Ascanio), Darren Jeffery (Balducci), Peter Coleman-Wright (Fieramosca), John Relyea (Pope Clement VII), Andrew Kennedy (Francesco), Andrew Foster-Williams (Bernardino), Jacques Imbrailo (Pompeo), Alasdair Elliott (Le cabaretier); London Symphony Chorus; London Symphony Orchestra; Sir Colin Davis, conductor. 2007.
- Naxos Blu-ray/DVD; Philipp Stozl director; Burkhard Fritz (Benvenuto Cellini), Maija Kovaļevska (Teresa), Laurent Naouri (Fieramosca), Kate Aldrich (Ascanio), Xavier Mas (Francesco), Brindley Sherratt (Balducci), Roberto Tagliavini (Bernardino), Adam Plachetka (Pompeo), Sung-Keun Park (Innkeeper), Mikhail Petrenko (Pope Clement VII); Vienna Philharmonic; Konzertvereinigung Wiener Staatsopernchor; Valery Gergiev conductor. 2007–2009
- Naxos Blu-ray/DVD; Terry Gilliam director; John Osborn (Benvenuto Cellini), Mariangela Sicilia (Teresa), Maurizio Muraro (Balducci), Michèle Losier (Ascanio), Laurent Naouri (Fieramosca), Orlin Anastassov (Pope Clement VII), Nicky Spence (Francesco), André Morsch (Pompeo), Scott Conner (Bernardino), Marcel Beekman (Un cabaretier); Dutch National Opera Chorus; Rotterdam Philharmonic Orchestra; Sir Mark Elder conductor. 2018
- Château de Versailles Spectacles DVD, Cat: CVS020: Michael Spyres (Benvenuto Cellini), Sophia Burgos (Teresa), Maurizio Muraro (Balducci), Adèle Charvet (Ascanio), Lionel Lhote (Fieramosca), Tareq Nazmi (Pope Clement VII), Vincent Delhoume (Francesco), Orchestre Révolutionnaire et Romantique, Monteverdi Choir, Sir John Eliot Gardiner. 2020
