= John Kentish =

John Kentish may refer to:

- John Kentish (tenor)
- John Kentish (minister)
