= Auguste Barbier =

French dramatist and poet

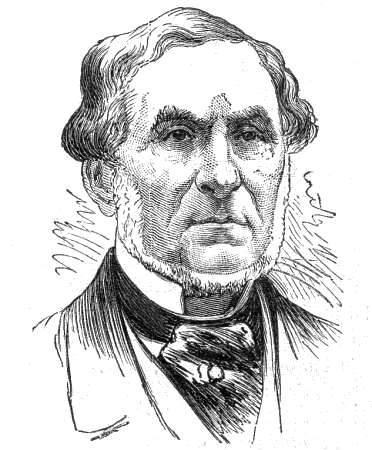
Henri Auguste Barbier

Henri Auguste Barbier (29 April 1805 – 13 February 1882) was a French dramatist and poet.

Barbier was born in Paris, France. He was inspired by the July Revolution and poured forth a series of eager, vigorous poems, denouncing the evils of the time. They are spoken of collectively as the Iambes (1831), though the designation is not strictly applicable to all. As the name suggests, they are modelled on the verse of André Chénier. They include La Curée, La Popularité, L'Idole, Paris, Dante, Quatre-vingt-treize and Varsovie. The rest of Barbier's poems are forgotten, and when, in 1869, he received the long delayed honour of admission to the Académie française, Montalembert expressed the general sentiment with "Barbier? mais il est mort!," but actually he died at Nice in 1882.

Barbier collaborated with Léon de Wailly in the libretto of Berlioz' opera Benvenuto Cellini, and his works include two series of poems on the political and social troubles of Italy and England, printed in later editions of Iambes et poèmes.

== Works ==
- La Curée (1830, dans la Revue de Paris).Texte sur wikisource
- Les Mauvais Garçons (1830). With Alphonse Royer.
- Iambes et poèmes (1831) Texte sur Wikisource
- II Pianto : poème (1833) Texte en ligne
- Salon de 1836. Suite d'articles publiés par le Journal de Paris (1836)
- Lazare : poème (1833)
- Satires et poèmes (1837)
- Nouvelles Satires : pot-de-vin et érostrate (1840)
- Chants civils et religieux (1841)
- Rimes héroïques (1843)
- Rimes légères : chansons et odelettes (1851)
- Satires et cahants (1853)
- Silves : poésies diverses (1864)
- Satires (1865) Texte sur Wikisource
- Trois passions (1867)
- Discours de réception (1870).
- Histoires de voyage : souvenirs et tableaux, 1830-1872 (1880). Réédition : Slatkine, Genève, 1973.
- Contes du Soir (1879).
- Chez les poètes : études, traductions et imitations en vers (1882) Texte en ligne
- Les Quatre Heures de la toilette des dames : poème érotique en quatre chants (1883)
- Œuvres posthumes (4 volumes, 1883-1889) Texte en ligne

Translations

- William Shakespeare : Jules César : tragédie (1848)
- Samuel Taylor Coleridge : La Chanson du vieux marin (1877)

Libretto

- Benvenuto Cellini, opera in 2 acts, lyrics by Léon de Wailly and Auguste Barbier, music by Hector Berlioz, Paris, premiered at the théâtre of the Académie royale de musique 3 September 1838. Texte en ligne

Popular Culture

His poem Le Gin is referenced in Season 2 of Les Témoins Texte en ligne The murderer writes graffiti near crime scenes based on these lines of the poem: "Les mères mêmes, en rentrant pas à pas, Laissent tomber les enfants de leurs bras, Et les enfants, aux yeux des folles mères, Vont se briser la tête sur les pierres."
