= Gustave de Wailly =

French playwright and Latinist (1804–1878)

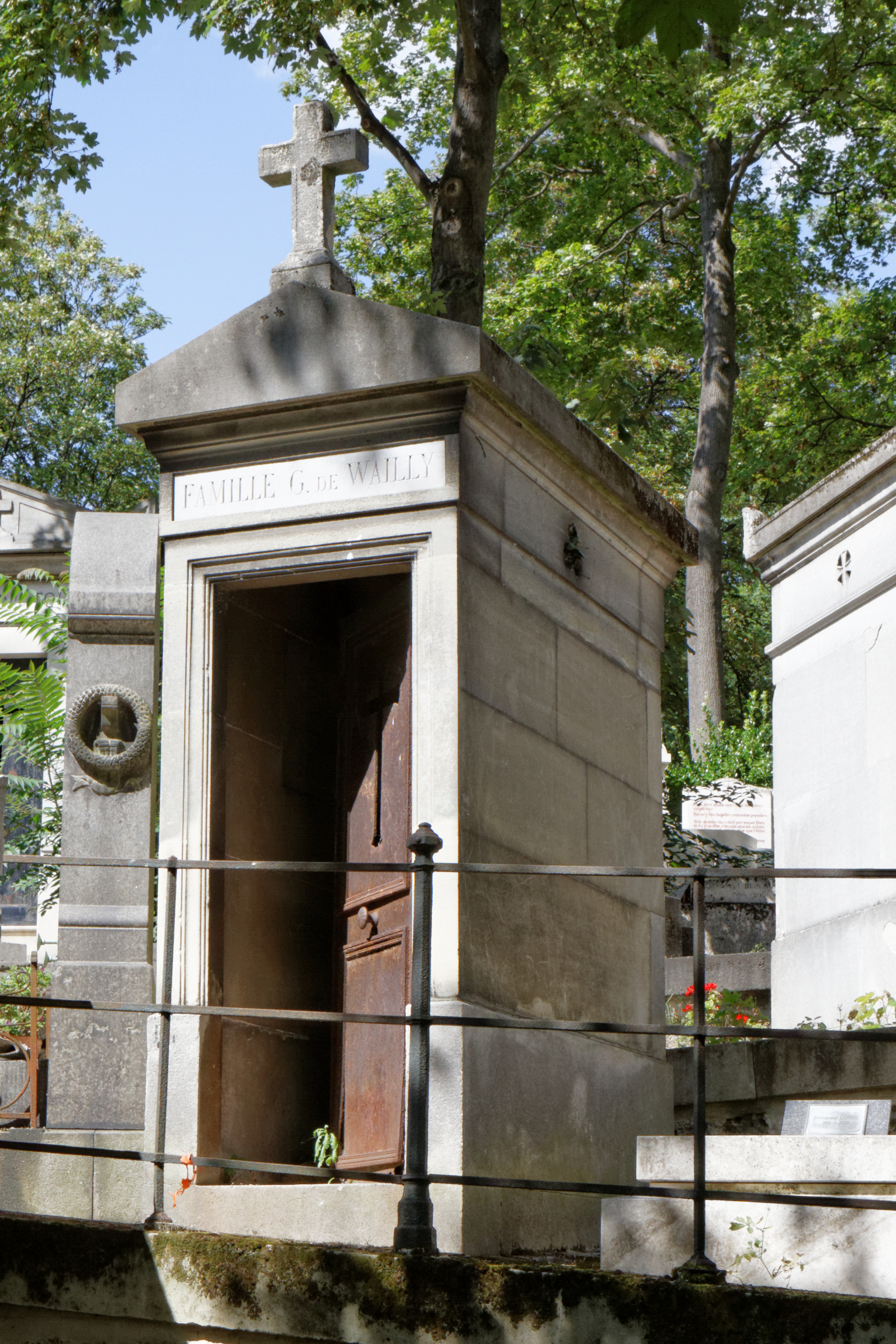
- Grave at Père Lachaise Cemetery
- Born: Gabriel Gustave de Wailly; 13 June 1804; Paris, France
- Died: 27 April 1878 (aged 73); 1st arrondissement of Paris, France
- Occupation: Playwright

Gabriel Gustave de Wailly (13 June 1804 – 27 April 1878) was a 19th-century French playwright and Latinist. Léon de Wailly was his brother.

== Biography ==
Brought up in a family of writers and academics, master of requests at the Conseil d’État (1830), he became inspector general of the former civil list and was known for his dramas.

He is buried at Père Lachaise Cemetery (20th division).

== Works ==
Some of his works were published under the pseudonym Mme Marie Senan.

- 1825: La Mort dans l'embarras, comédie nouvelle, in 3 acts and in verse, with Léon de Wailly
- 1826: Amour et intrigue, drama in 5 acts and in verse, imitated from Schiller
- 1826: Ivanhoé, opera in 3 acts, music by Gioacchino Rossini
- 1827: La Folle, ou Le testament d'un Anglaise, comedy
- 1827: Anglais et français, comedy in 1 act and in prose, with Jean-François-Alfred Bayard
- 1827: L'Oncle Philibert, comedy in 1 act and in prose, with Jean-François-Alfred Bayard
- 1830: Ma place et ma femme, comedy in 3 acts and in prose, with Jean-François-Alfred Bayard
- 1832: Madame du Chatelet, ou, Point de lendemain, comedy in 1 act, with François Ancelot
- 1838: L'Attente, drama in 1 act (by Mme Marie Senan)
- 1849: Elzéar Chalamel ou, Une assurance sur la vie, Comédie envaudeville in 3 acts, with Jules de Wailly
- 1850: Monck ou, Le sauveur de l'Angleterre, historical comedy in 5 acts
- 1852: Les Premières Armes de Blaveau, comédie en vaudeville in 1 act, with Jules de Wailly
- 1853: L'Oncle Tom, drama in 5 acts
- 1873: Œuvres de Alfred, Gustave et Jules de Wailly
- 1897: Promenade d'une famille anglaise à Paris monologue pour enfants, posthumous
- 1898: L'Oreiller qui pleure monologue, posthumous
- Louise, feuilleton
- Les Parapluies, comedy in 1 act, with Gaston de Wailly
- Les Deux Devoirs, sea drama 1n 3 acts
- Les Deux Honneurs, military drama in 3 acts

=== Translations ===
He realised many translations among others of Seneca the Younger and Virgil :

- 1836: Œuvres complètes de Sénèque le philosophe, with Alfred de Wailly.
- 1878: Odes d'Horace, with Étienne-Augustin De Wailly.

== Honours ==
- Chevalier of the Légion d'honneur (30 July 1832)

== Bibliography ==
- J.P.R Cuisin, Dictionnaire des gens de lettres vivants, 1826, (p. 264)
- Joseph Fr. Michaud, Louis Gabriel Michaud, Biographie universelle, 1843, vol.44, (p. 209)
- Joseph-Marie Quérard, Charles Louandre, La Littérature française contemporaine : XIX, 1857, (p. 591)
- Gustave Vapereau, Dictionnaire universel des contemporains, 1865,(p. 1814)
- Henri Van Hoof, Dictionnaire universel des traducteurs, 1993
