= Sylvia Gähwiller =

Swiss soprano (1909–1999)

Sylvia Gähwiller (5 July 1909 – 19 March 1999) was a Swiss operatic soprano and a voice teacher. She was most successful as a concert and recital singer, who also performed works by contemporary composers.

== Life and career ==
Born in Zürich, Gähwiller studied piano at the Breslau conservatory from 1926 to 1928, then at the Stern Conservatory in Berlin from 1927 to 1928. She studied further in Vienna from 1928 to 1930, piano with Friedrich Wührer and composition with Karl Weigl. In 1932 she received the diploma to teach voice. From 1936 to 1941, she studied voice with Ria Ginster at the Zürich Conservatory.

Gähwiller was engaged at the Theater St. Gallen from 1941 to 1942 where she continued to appear as a guest until 1947. She appeared there as Pamina in Mozart's Die Zauberflöte, Konstanze in his Die Entführung aus dem Serail, Countess Almaviva in his Le nozze di Figaro, Baroness Freimann in Lortzing's Der Wildschütz, Mimì in Puccini's La bohème, Rosina in Rossini's Il barbiere di Siviglia, Elmire in Schock's Erwin und Elmire and the title role in Flotow's Martha.

She became internationally known especially as a concert and lieder singer. She interpreted classical works by Johann Sebastian Bach, George Frideric Handel, Joseph Haydn and Wolfgang Amadeus Mozart, among others, as well as contemporary works by, for example Paul Hindemith, Willy Burkhard, Arthur Honegger, Alban Berg, Maurice Ravel, Béla Bartók, Ernst Krenek and Arnold Schoenberg.

Gähwiller can be heard on several recordings, for example under the direction of Walter Goehr as Cleopatra in Giulio Cesare in Egitto and as Poppea in L'incoronazione di Poppea as well as song singer in Othmar Schoeck plays Othmar Schoeck and in Zürcher Liederbuch 1986.

In the 1960s and 1970s she taught singing at the conservatories of Zürich and Winterthur, after which she continued to give private lessons. Among her pupils were the singers Carmen Anhorn, Jacqueline Bügler, Barbara Geiser-Peyer, Hedy Graf, Kathrin Graf, Hedda Heusser and Barbara Martig-Tüller as well as the baritones Hans Riediker and Niklaus Tüller.

== Awards ==
- 1976: Hans-Georg-Nägeli-Medaille of Zürich.
