= Joseph Isidore Samson =

French actor and playwright (1793–1871)

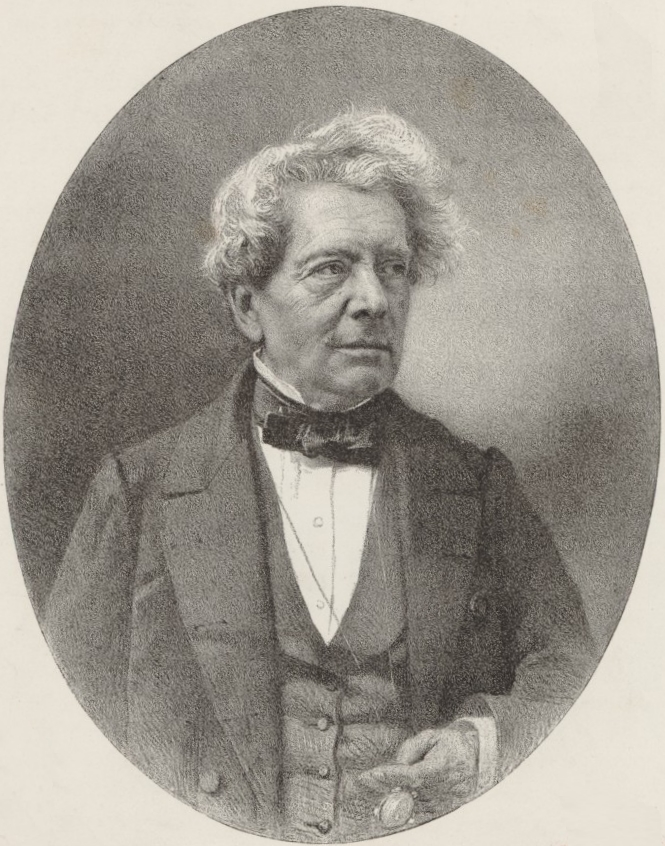
- Pencil and charcoal sketch (1850)
- Born: 2 July 1793; Saint-Denis, France
- Died: 28 March 1871 (aged 77); Paris, France
- Education: Conservatoire de Paris
- Occupations: actor, playwright, professor
- Employer(s): Comédie-Française, Conservatoire de Paris

Joseph Isidore Samson (2 July 1793 – 28 March 1871) was a 19th-century French actor and playwright.

== Life ==
Samson was born at Saint-Denis, near Paris, the son of a restaurateur. He took first prize for comedy at the Conservatoire in 1812, married an actress with whom he had toured in France, and joined the Comédie-Française in 1826. There he remained until 1863, creating more than 250 parts.

In 1829 Samson became a professor at the Conservatoire, under whom Rachel Félix (1821–1858), Rose Cheri (1824–1861), the Brohans and others were trained. He wrote several comedies, among them La Belle-Mère et le gendre (1826), and La Famille poisson (1846). Samson died in Paris on 28 March 1871.

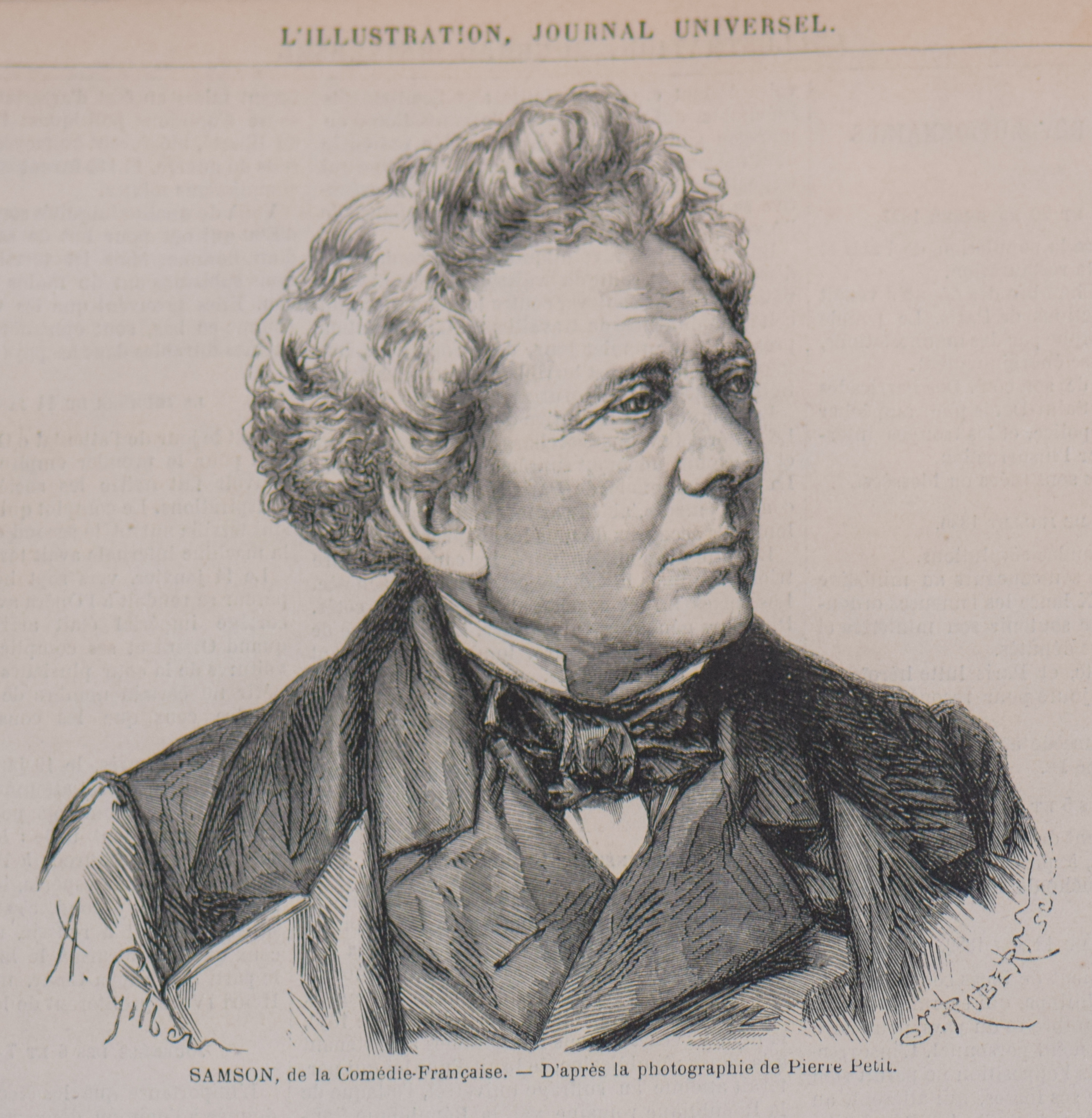
Engraving of Joseph Isidore Samson in 1871

== Works ==
Theatre

- La Fête de Molière, comédie épisodique in 1 act and in verse, Paris, Théâtre de l'Odéon, 15 January 1825
- La Belle-mère et le gendre, comedy in 3 acts, in verse, Paris, Théâtre de l'Odéon, 20 April 1826
- Un Veuvage, comedy in 3 acts and in verse, Paris, Théâtre-Français, 27 May 1842
- Un Péché de jeunesse, comedy in 1 act, mingled with song, with Jules de Wailly. Paris, Théâtre du Vaudeville, 28 March 1843
- La Famille Poisson, ou les Trois Crispins, comedy in 1 act, Paris, Théâtre-Français, 15 December 1845
- La Dot de ma fille, comedy in 1 act, in verse, Paris, Théâtre-Français, 13 December 1854

Other

- Collection des rapports faits par M. Samson, de l'Association de secours mutuels entre les artistes dramatiques, 1851 Text online
- Mémoires de Samson, de la Comédie française, 1862 Text online
- L'Art théâtral, 2 vols, 1863–1865

== Bibliography ==
- Eugène de Mirecourt, Samson, J.-P. Roret, Paris, 1854 Text online
- Madame Joseph-Isidore Samson, Rachel et Samson : souvenirs de théâtre, foreword by Jules Claretie, P. Ollendorff, Paris, 1898 Text online
