= Becoming Traviata =

- Directed by: Philippe Béziat
- Release date: 24 October 2012
- Country: France
- Language: French

Becoming Traviata is a 2012 French documentary film chronicling rehearsals of the 1853 Giuseppe Verdi opera La traviata at the Aix-en-Provence Festival. Directed by Philippe Béziat, the film focuses largely on stage director Jean-François Sivadier working with coloratura soprano Natalie Dessay. The film's French title is Traviata et nous (Traviata and Us).

== Background, production ==
Dessay first performed the role of Violetta at the Santa Fe Opera in 2009, two years before this, her European debut of the part. Some observers felt the role's demands exceeded Dessay's voice and speculated that such challenges may shorten her career. During rehearsals, Dessay uses a technique common among soloists of "marking", that is, singing the part in less than a full voice. In the film, tenor Charles Castronovo and baritone Ludovic Tézier do the same. In October 2013, Dessay announced she would take a sabbatical from opera at least through 2015, singing only in concert.

In the first days of rehearsal, Dessay found the film crew an unwelcome presence, an intruder at an intimate process in which the participants, who don't always know each other, learn to work together. The crew, in turn, worked at a more discreet distance. They shot more than 100 hours of footage, which was edited down to a running time of 1 hour, 52 minutes. Dessay was happy with the results "because it explains what we're doing but it stays mysterious. There's no recipe for what we do."

== Reception ==
On National Public Radio's Deceptive Cadence website, Tom Huizenga wrote that Becoming Traviata is arguably a film for opera geeks. "The long stretches of Sivadier explaining blocking, facial expressions and emotional underpinnings will fascinate some and fatigue others." Huizenga and Boston Globe critic Jeffrey Gantz thought the film was less approachable because it neither outlined the opera's plot nor revealed how the performance played in front of an audience. But, wrote Huizenga, the film's take on collaboration between the director, conductor and performers illuminates the creative process while continuing "the good fight to break down barriers between classical music and popular culture." He called La traviata a perfect choice for Béziat's aims: just as Verdi was writing an opera about everyday people, so does the documentary, which depicts opera "with its hair down", bring its audience closer to "seeing ourselves, backstage, struggling to bring our own realities to life."

The New York Times reviewer Rachel Saltz credited soprano Dessay with letting the hard work of rehearsals show through. She wears minimal makeup and "lets the camera observe her closely. We see her bra strap, the freckles on her back, her wrinkles and blemishes. For an opera star, for any kind of star, it's remarkably unvain and oddly endearing."
