= Natalie Dessay =

French singer (born 1965)

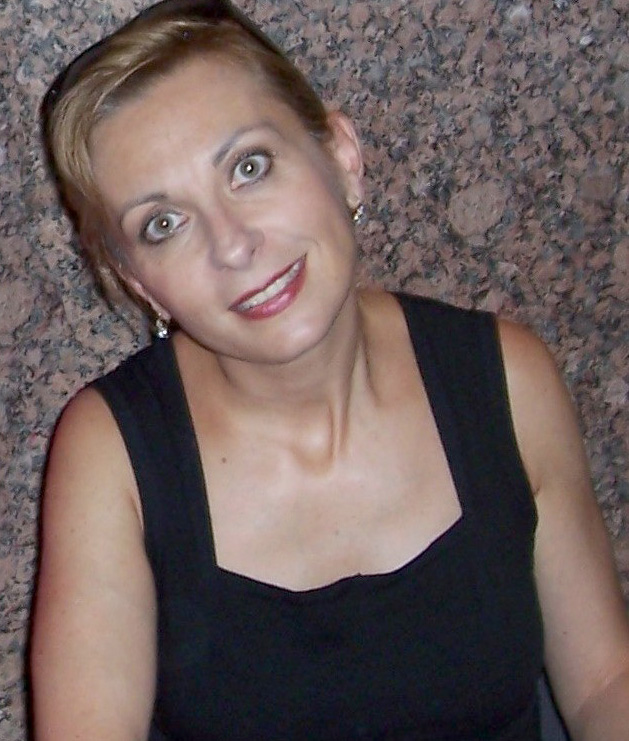
- Dessay in 2008
- Born: Nathalie Dessaix; 19 April 1965 (age 61); Lyon, France
- Occupations: Opera singer; recitalist; theatre actress
- Years active: 1990–2025
- Spouse: Laurent Naouri (m. 1994)
- Awards: Kammersängerin; Legion of Honour; Ordre des Arts et des Lettres
- Website: www.nataliedessay.fr

Natalie Dessay (French: [natali dəsɛ]; born 19 April 1965) is a French soprano, best known as an opera singer before her retirement from the opera stage in 2013. She gained wide recognition after her portrayal of Olympia in The Tales of Hoffmann in 1992, and then performing at leading stages, such as the Paris Opera, Vienna State Opera, and the Metropolitan Opera.

Since her earlier career she had been known in coloratura soprano roles in the German and French repertoire, such as Olympia in The Tales of Hoffmann, the title role in Lakmé, Zerbinetta in Ariadne auf Naxos and the Queen of the Night in The Magic Flute. After two vocal surgeries she turned her focus to heavier bel canto roles, such as Amina in La sonnambula, Lucia in Lucia di Lammermoor, Marie in La fille du régiment, Violetta in La traviata, and further explored Baroque music with her collaborations with Emmanuelle Haïm. Since retiring from opera stage, she has pursued a career in theatre and in concert, where she now performs, besides classical, genres such as jazz and chansons.

She made dozens of recordings for the EMI Classics and Virgin Classics label, and then for Erato Records/Warner Classics. Since 2016, she has been recording for Sony Classical Records.

== Early and personal life ==
Nathalie Dessaix was born in Lyon, she was raised in Saint-Médard-en-Jalles, where she had a few singing lessons with madame Saintrais, a former chorister at the Bordeaux Opera. She dropped the silent "h" in her first name in honour of Natalie Wood when she was in grade school and subsequently simplified the spelling of her surname. In her youth, she had intended to be a ballet dancer and then an actress. After abandoning German, she began taking acting lessons with Gérard Laurent at the Conservatoire de Bordeaux. At the age of 20, her vocal talent was discovered when playing a singing lutin, humming Pamina's aria in Molière's Le Sicilien ou l'Amour peintre, after which she was encouraged to take singing lessons. After graduating with first prize, she joined the choir of the Théâtre du Capitole in Toulouse. In 1988, she won the first edition of competition "Voix Nouvelles", (Note: First or second prize according to different sources.) run by France Télécom and was granted a year's study at the "École d'art lyrique" of the Paris Opera, where she sang Elisa in Mozart's Il re pastore. In 1990, she won first prize at the International Mozart Competition in Vienna. Since 1991, she worked with her private tutor, tenor Jean-Pierre Blivet.

Dessay first met bass-baritone Laurent Naouri in 1989. They married in August 1994, and she converted to his Jewish faith. The couple have two children, Tom-Solal (b. 1995) and Neïma-Judith (b. 1998). The family lives in La Varenne-Saint-Hilaire.

== Career ==
=== Early opera career (1990–2000) ===
Dessay was quickly approached by a number of regional theatres, and engaged in roles such as Blonde (Die Entführung aus dem Serail), Madame Herz (Der Schauspieldirektor), Zerbinetta (Ariadne auf Naxos). In 1990, she sang Barbarina (The Marriage of Figaro) at the Opéra de Marseille, Bettina (Don Procopio) at the Opéra-Comique, Néméa (Si j'étais roi) at the Opéra Royal de Wallonie. In December 1991, she performed Adele (Die Fledermaus) at the Grand Théâtre de Genève.

In April 1992 she made her Paris Opera debut, singing the role of Olympia in The Tales of Hoffmann with José van Dam. The Roman Polanski production was not well received, but it began her road to stardom. In 1993, she joined in the troupe of the Vienna State Opera as Blonde in Mozart's Die Entführung. In December, she was asked to replace Cheryl Studer, who was going to perform all main female roles, in Olympia in a production of Hoffmann. After attending a performance where Barbara Bonney had sung Sophie in Der Rosenkavalier under Carlos Kleiber, she was cast in the same role with another conductor. Besides Olympia, Blonde, Zerbinetta, her best known and most often played roles, she also performed Italian Singer (Capriccio), Aminta (Die schweigsame Frau), Fiakermilli (Arabella) with the company.

Dessay sang her first Queen of the Night in The Magic Flute at the 1994 Aix-en-Provence Festival in Robert Carsen's staging to critical acclaim. She went on performing the role in productions at the Opéra National de Lyon, Salzburg Festival, Opéra Bastille, Vienna State Opera. In October 1994, she made her New York Metropolitan Opera debut with Fiakermilli. In 1995, she first performed the title role in Lakmé at the Opéra-Comique, and La Scala debut in The Tales of Hoffmann. In 1996, she debuted in the role of Ophélie in Hamlet opposite Simon Keenlyside at the Grand Théâtre de Genève; the new production by Moshe Leiser and Patrice Caurier revived in 2003 at the Royal Opera House, Covent Garden and the Liceu with her in the same role.

In 1997 she sang the title role in Stravinsky's The Nightingale conducted by Pierre Boulez and staged by Stanislas Nordey at the Théâtre du Châtelet. She returned to the Metropolitan Opera in September as Zerbinetta, and then returned to the Opéra de Lyon in Offenbach's Orphée aux enfers. In 1998 she portrayed Olympia at the Met, and later in the year in Lyon, performed Tytania in Britten's A Midsummer Night's Dream and Aspasia in Mozart's Mitridate, re di Ponto. In 1999 she took on the role of Amina in La sonnambula at the Lausanne Opera. She collaborated with William Christie in several projects: Carsen's new production of Handel's Alcina, which premiered at the Palais Garnier and later staged at the Lyric Opera of Chicago, and Andrei Serban's new production of Rameau's Les Indes galantes, which opened the new Paris Opera season.

Dessay was Olympia in Robert Carsen's new production of The Tales of Hoffmann, premiering on 22 March 2000, at the Opéra Bastille. She starred in Hamlet at the Théâtre du Capitole and later at the Théâtre du Châtelet. In July 2000, she opened the new Jérôme Savary's production as Olympia at the Chorégies d'Orange. Later in the year, she took up the role of Konstanze in Die Entführung aus dem Serail at the Grand Théâtre de Genève, and then interpreted the Queen of the Night for the last time at Palais Garnier, with her last performance on 24 December 2000.

=== Vocal problems (2001–2004) ===
Dessay started 2001 by opening La sonnambula at La Scala. In February, she took part in a Vienna-Dresden co-production of Die schweigsame Frau at the Théâtre du Châtelet.

During the 2001/02 season in Vienna, Dessay began to experience vocal difficulties and had to be replaced in almost all of the performances of La sonnambula. Subsequently, she was forced to cancel several other performances, including the French version of Lucia di Lammermoor in Lyon and a Zerbinetta at the Royal Opera House in London. She withdrew from the stage and underwent surgery to remove a vocal cord nodule in July 2002.

She returned to the stage in March 2003 in Ariadne auf Naxos at the Met, and later in the year performed in the premiere of Laurent Pelly's new production of the opera at the Palais Garnier. In the summer of 2003, she gave her first US recital in Santa Fe. She was so attracted to New Mexico in general and Santa Fe in particular that the Santa Fe Opera quickly rearranged its schedule to feature her in a new production of La sonnambula during the 2004 season. In 2004, she also performed her first Italian Lucia at the Lyric Opera of Chicago and first Massenet's Manon at the Grand Théâtre de Genève.

In the 2004/05 season, she withdrew from Ariadne auf Naxos at the Opéra Bastille and cancelled concert performances at the Théâtre des Champs-Élysées. She underwent surgery to remove a polyp on the other vocal cord and began vocal training subsequently.

=== Later opera career (2005–2013) ===
Dessay returned on stage in a benefit concert at the Opéra de Montréal on 8 May 2005, and later in the month, took part in Haydn's The Creation at the Festival de Saint-Denis. In November she starred in Gounod's Roméo et Juliette as Juliette at the Metropolitan Opera. She withdrew the premiere on 14 November, reportedly ill, but resumed in the following performances. In July 2006 she returned to Santa Fe Opera, singing Pamina in The Magic Flute. In September she opened the Paris Opera season in Lucia di Lammermoor at the Opéra Bastille and then performed La sonnambula in concert version at the Opéra de Lyon and the Théâtre des Champs-Élysées, the former of which was recorded and released on CD.

The year 2007 saw Dessay starring in the premiere of Laurent Pelly's production of La fille du régiment at Covent Garden, and its reprise at the Vienna State Opera. She performed the title role in Manon at the Liceu in Barcelona in June/July and opened the season at the Metropolitan Opera in the new Mary Zimmerman production of Lucia di Lammermoor. She returned in the same season to sing Lucia again and subsequently reprised in Pelly's production of La fille du régiment. She later returned to the production twice, in London (2010) and in Paris (2012). She went on performing Lucia at the San Francisco Opera and a joint concert with tenor Jonas Kaufmann as part of the Festival de Radio France et Montpellier. In October 2008, she sang Manon at the Lyric Opera of Chicago.

In January 2009 she sang the part of Mélisande in a much acclaimed production of Debussy's Pelléas et Mélisande at the Theater an der Wien. On 2 March 2009, Dessay premiered in Zimmerman's new production of La sonnambula opposite Juan Diego Flórez at the New York Metropolitan Opera. It was the opera's revival at the company after 37 years since Renata Scotto's performance. On 3 July 2009 she gave her first performance in the role of Violetta in La traviata at Santa Fe Opera in a production by Laurent Pelly with her husband Laurent Naouri appearing as Giorgio Germont. In October, she performed in Musetta in La bohème at the Opéra Bastille.

In 2010, Dessay performed in La sonnambula at the Opéra Bastille. Due to illness, she cancelled the final two performances in the run as well as the upcoming Hamlet at the Met, where she was replaced by Marlis Petersen. After performing her last La sonnambula at the Vienna State Opera, on 20 April 2010 she was awarded the title of Austrian Kammersängerin. She debuted in Russia in a solo concert with the Mariinsky Theatre Orchestra on 18 June, and also participated in the 150 anniversary concert of the theatre on 17 September. She performed in a joint concert with Juan Diego Flórez at the Chorégies d'Orange, before going on Teatro Regio di Torino's Japan tour of La traviata.

In 2011, she debuted in the role of Cleopatra in Handel's Giulio Cesare, conducted by Emmanuelle Haïm, at the Palais Garnier. Ill, she was replaced by Canadian soprano Jane Archibald in some performances, who shared the role in the run. She then returned to the Met for Lucia, and performed in Pelléas et Mélisande in concert form at the Théâtre des Champs-Élysées and the Barbican Centre, before heading to Moscow for a concert version of Lucia with the Mariinsky Theatre Orchestra. She portrayed Violetta at the Aix-en-Provence Festival in a new production of La traviata, which later reprised at the Vienna State Opera with her in the same role. The development of the production in France was filmed as part of the 2012 documentary Becoming Traviata.

In January 2012, Dessay starred in the premiere of Coline Serreau's production of Massenet's Manon in the title role at the Opéra Bastille. She returned to the Met in April for Willy Decker's production of La traviata, where she was replaced by Hong Hei-kyung on the opening night and, in another performance, after the first act, due to a cold. She was originally going to portray all main heroines in The Tales of Hoffmann at the Salle Pleyel, yet she withdrew for unspecified reasons and was replaced by Sonya Yoncheva. In 2013, she limited herself to Antonia in a revival of Pelly's production of the same opera, which took place at the Liceu and the San Francisco Opera. In April 2013, she was featured as Cleopatra in David McVicar's production of Giulio Cesare at the Metropolitan Opera.

In June 2013, Dessay announced that the title role of Massenet's Manon at the Théâtre du Capitole in Toulouse on 15 October 2013 would be her final operatic performance. (Note: She also mentioned the possibility of returning in 2015, which was not seen in later interviews.) Previously she had mentioned plans of taking a sabbatical from opera performance in 2015. She described her retirement as "opera is quitting her", as she had done all the roles suitable for her light soprano voice and had no intention to be further associated with them.

=== Post-opera career ===
Dessay had collaborated frequently with Michel Legrand in concerts. In May 2009, she dedicated two concerts of songs written by him in Toulouse. In 2013, they released a joint album entitled Entre elle et lui.

She voices Gabi the poisonous frog in the Canadian French dub of the 2014 film Rio 2.

Dessay made her theatre debut in May 2015 in a French adaption of Howard Barker's monologue Und, staged by Jacques Vincey, at the Théâtre Olympia in Tours. The programme reprised in July at the Théâtre de l'Athénée as part of Festival Paris Quartier d'été. In 2016, it toured to Paris, Marseille, Valence, and Orléans. In 2017, it was further toured, and later ran at the Théâtre Déjazet in Paris.

On 27 November 2015, she sang Barbara's Perlimpinpin accompanied by Alexandre Tharaud at the national tribute to the victims of the November 2015 Paris attacks.

In 2016 she released an album inspired by the paintings of Edward Hopper, Portraits of America. The concept started by selecting eight French prose poems based on Hopper paintings by the poet Claude Esteban, from his award-winning collection of forty-seven such poems, Soleil dans une pièce vide (Sun in an Empty room, 1991). These were set to music by composer Graciane Finzi, and recording with reading by Dessay. These poems were supplemented by selecting ten additional Hopper paintings, and songs from the American songbook to go with them.

== Artistry ==
Dessay emphasizes the acting aspect in opera and describes herself as a "singing actress" (une actrice qui chante). She once expounded:

"[Acting] is more important. For me, singing and music are only a means of expression, the goal being a theatrical and emotional experience. ... it would be 70% theater and 30% music and voice, which is not to say that it is unimportant, because you must have that 30%. You can't say, "I act and I don't care if I don't sing well." You must sing well and make music, be a musician. But that's only 30% of the singer's work, even if that 30% is primordial."

== Awards and honours ==
- 33345 Nataliedessay, asteroid
- Singer of the Year (Artiste lyrique de l'année) in the Victoires de la musique classique (1995, 1996, 1998, 2000, 2002, 2005)
- 2002: Prize of Music of the Simone and Cino Del Duca Foundation from the Académie des Beaux-Arts
- 2003: Chevalier of the Ordre des Arts et des Lettres
- 2008: Laurence Olivier Award for her Covent Garden performance of La fille du régiment
- 2008: Opera News Award
- 2008: Prize in honorem from Académie Charles-Cros for her entire career
- 2010: Austrian Kammersängerin
- 2011: Chevalier of the Legion of Honour
- 2011: Laurent-Perrier Grand Century Prize
- 2015: Commandeur of the Ordre des Arts et des Lettres

== Opera roles ==
The roles which have been performed on stage or fully recorded in studio.

- Elisa, Il re pastore (Mozart)
- A little girl, Joseph (Méhul)
- Barbarina, Le nozze di Figaro (Mozart)
- Bettina, Don Procopio (Bizet)
- Néméa, Si j'étais roi (Adam)
- Madame Herz, Der Schauspieldirektor (Mozart)
- Zaide, Zaide (Mozart)
- Minka, Le roi malgré lui (Chabrier)
- Naiad, Ariadne auf Naxos (Strauss)
- Adele, Die Fledermaus (J. Strauss II)
- Javotte, Le roi l'a dit (Delibes)
- Olympia, Les contes d'Hoffmann (Offenbach)
- Violante, La prova di un'opera seria (Gnecco)
- Blonde, Die Entführung aus dem Serail (Mozart)
- Zerbinetta, Ariadne auf Naxos (Strauss)
- Sophie, Der Rosenkavalier (Strauss)
- Le feu, L'enfant et les sortilèges (Ravel)
- Italian Singer, Capriccio (Strauss)
- Fiakermilli, Arabella (Strauss)
- Queen of the Night, Die Zauberflöte (Mozart)
- Lakmé, Lakmé (Delibes)
- Ophélie (Ophelia), Hamlet (Thomas)
- Aminta, Die schweigsame Frau (Strauss)
- Nightingale (Rossignol), The Nightingale (Stravinsky)
- Eurydice, Orphée aux enfers (Offenbach)
- Tytania, A Midsummer Night's Dream (Britten)
- Aspasia, Mitridate, re di Ponto (Mozart)
- Amina, La sonnambula (Bellini)
- Morgana, Alcina (Handel)
- Hébé/Fatime/Zima, Les Indes galantes (Rameau)
- Konstanze, Die Entführung aus dem Serail (Mozart)
- Lucia, Lucia di Lammermoor (Donizetti)
- La Musica, L'Orfeo (Monteverdi)
- Manon, Manon (Massenet)
- Juliette, Roméo et Juliette (Gounod)
- Pamina, Die Zauberflöte (Mozart)
- Marie, La fille du régiment (Donizetti)
- Mélisande, Pelléas et Mélisande (Debussy)
- Violetta, La traviata (Verdi)
- Musetta, La bohème (Puccini)
- Cleopatra, Giulio Cesare (Handel)
- Antonia, Les contes d'Hoffmann (Offenbach)

== Discography ==
=== Solo recitals and collaborations ===
- Mozart: Concert Arias (1995). Theodor Guschlbauer, Orchestre de l'Opéra de Lyon (EMI)
- French Opera Arias (1996). Patrick Fournillier, Orchestre Philharmonique de Monte-Carlo (EMI)
- The EMI Centenary Gala at Glyndebourne (1997)
- Vocalises (1998). Michael Schønwandt, Berliner Sinfonie-Orchester (EMI)
- Mozart Heroines (2000). Louis Langrée, Orchestra of the Age of Enlightenment (Virgin)
- Handel: Arcadian Duets (2002). Emmanuelle Haïm, Le Concert d'Astrée (Virgin)
- French Opera Arias (2003). Michel Plasson, Orchestre national du Capitole de Toulouse, Les Éléments (Virgin)
- Claude Nougaro: La note bleue (2004). (Blue Note)
- Strauss: Amor (Opera Scenes and Lieder) (2004). Antonio Pappano, Royal Opera House Orchestra (Virgin)
- Delirio: Handel Cantatas (2005). Emmanuelle Haïm, Le Concert d'Astrée (Virgin)
- Italian Opera Arias (2007). Evelino Pidò, Concerto Köln (Virgin)
- David Linx: Changing Faces (2007)
- The Miracle of the Voice + documentary Greatest Moments on Stage (2006, compilation). (Virgin)
- Lamenti (2008). (Virgin)
- Bach: Cantatas (2008). Emmanuelle Haïm, Le Concert d'Astrée (Virgin)
- Mad Scenes (2009, compilation). (Virgin)
- Fiction: Live at Folies Bergère (2009). [DVD]
- Quatuor Ébène: Fiction (2010). (Virgin)
- Handel: Cleopatra (2011). Emmanuelle Haïm, Le Concert d'Astrée (Virgin)
- Une fête Baroque (2012). Emmanuelle Haïm, Le Concert d'Astrée (live, Virgin)
- Debussy: Clair de lune (2012). Philippe Cassard (Virgin)
- Alexandre Tharaud: Le Bœuf sur le toit (2012). (Virgin)
- Rio–Paris (2014). (Erato)
- De l'opéra à la chanson (2014, compilation). (Erato)
- Fiançailles pour rire: Mélodies françaises (2015). Philippe Cassard (Erato)
- Baroque (2015, compilation). (Erato)
- Pictures of America (2016). (Sony)
- Schubert: Lieder (2017). Philippe Cassard (Sony)
- Between Yesterday and Tomorrow (2017). (Sony)
- Nougaro: Sur l'écran noir de mes nuits blanches (2019). Yvan Cassar (Sony)

=== Operas ===
==== CDs ====
- Méhul: La Légende de Joseph en Egypte (1989). Claude Bardon, Orchestre Régional de Picardie (Le Chant du Monde)
- Offenbach: Les contes d'Hoffmann (1996). Kent Nagano, Orchestra & Chorus of the Opéra National de Lyon (Erato)
- Mozart: Die Zauberflöte (1996). William Christie, Les Arts Florissants (Erato)
- Delibes: Lakmé (1998). Michel Plasson, Chœur & Orchestre national du Capitole de Toulouse (EMI)
- Offenbach: Orphée aux enfers (1998). Marc Minkowski, Choir & Orchestra of the Opéra National de Lyon (EMI)
- Handel: Alcina (1999). William Christie, Les Arts Florissants (live, Erato)
- Stravinsky: Le rossignol and Renard (1999). James Conlon, Orchestra of the Paris Opera (EMI)
- Mozart: Mitridate, re di Ponto (1999). Christophe Rousset, Les Talens Lyriques (Decca)
- Strauss: Ariadne auf Naxos (2001). Giuseppe Sinopoli, Staatskapelle Dresden (Deutsche Grammophon)
- Donizetti: Lucie de Lammermoor (2002). Evelino Pidò, Orchestra & Chorus of the Opéra National de Lyon (Virgin)
- Monteverdi: L'Orfeo (2004). Emmanuelle Haïm, Le Concert d'Astrée, Les Sacqueboutiers (Virgin)
- Bellini: La sonnambula (2007). Evelino Pidò, Orchestra & Chorus of the Opéra National de Lyon (Virgin)
- Donizetti: Lucia di Lammermoor (2011). Valery Gergiev, Mariinsky Theatre Orchestra & Chorus (live, Mariinsky)

==== DVDs ====
- Méhul: La Légende de Joseph en Egypte (1989)
- Offenbach: Les contes d'Hoffmann (1997)
- Offenbach: Orphée aux enfers (1997)
- Strauss: Arabella (2002)
- Strauss: Ariadne auf Naxos (2003)
- Thomas: Hamlet (2004)
- Massenet: Manon (2007)
- Donizetti: La fille du régiment (2007)
- Debussy: Pelléas et Mélisande (2009)
- Bellini: La sonnambula (2010)
- Verdi: La traviata (2012)
- Handel: Giulio Cesare (2012)

=== Sacred and concert works ===
- Carmina Burana (Orff) (1995)
- Mozart: Great Mass in C minor and Masonic Funeral Music (2006)
- Magnificat (Bach) and Dixit Dominus (Handel) (2007)
- Handel: Il trionfo del tempo e del disinganno (2007)
- Symphony No. 2 (Mahler) (2010, live)
- A German Requiem (Brahms) (2011, live)

=== Soundtrack / spoken ===
- Time Regained (1999, Jorge Arriagada)
- Joyeux Noël (2006, Philippe Rombi)
- La boîte à joujoux (2007, spoken children's story)
- La petite sirène (2008, spoken children's story)
- Le lac des cygnes (2017, spoken children's story)

=== Joint albums ===
- Entre elle et lui (with Michel Legrand) (2013)

== Films ==
- Stravinsky: Le rossignol (2005)
- Becoming Traviata (2012)
- Rio 2 as Gabi (2014)
- Dilili in Paris as Emma Calvé (2018)
