= Léon de Wailly =

French writer, translator and librettist

- Born: Armand François Léon de Wailly; 28 July 1804; Paris
- Died: 25 April 1864 (aged 59); Paris
- Occupations: Novelist, playwright, translator

Armand François Léon de Wailly (28 July 1804 – 25 April 1864) was a 19th-century French novelist, playwright, adaptor and translator.

== Biography ==
Born into a family of writers and academics, graduated from the École des chartes, Léon de Wailly became a close friend of Alfred de Vigny and worked as private secretary for Sosthène de La Rochefoucauld. He became known for his numerous translations of English writers (poetry) and his collaboration with P. J. Stahl in the adaptation of British classics (including William Shakespeare). Gustave de Wailly was his brother.

== Works ==
- 1825: Le Mort dans l’embarras, comédie nouvelle, in 3 acts and in verse, with Gustave de Wailly
- 1834: Benvenuto Cellini, opera in 2 acts, libretto with Henri Auguste Barbier and Alfred de Vigny, music by Hector Berlioz
- 1838: Angelica Kauffmann
- 1844: L’Héritage de vie
- 1848: Pensées morales et maximes
- 1854: Stella et Vanessa
- 1855: L'oncle Tom, drama in 5 acts and 9 tableaux
- 1860: Les Deux filles de M. Dubreuil
- 1862: Le Doyen de Saint-Patrick (drama in 5 acts, in prose with Louis Ulbach)

== Translations ==
He translated works from Matthew Gregory Lewis (The Monk), Jonathan Swift, Shakespeare, Henry Fielding (The History of Tom Jones, a Foundling), Robert Burns (Poésies complètes), Laurence Sterne (The Life and Opinions of Tristram Shandy, Gentleman, A Sentimental Journey) and also Fanny Burney (Evelina).

== Adaptations ==
- Mary Bell, William et Lafaine. La vie des enfants en Amérique, Adapted from English by P.-J. Stahl and de Wailly, Hetzel, 1895
- Les Vacances de Riquet et de Madeleine, Adapted from English by P.-J. Stahl and de Wailly, Hetzel, 1908–1909
