= Ralph Griffin =

American sculptor (1925–1992)

- Ralph Griffin with one of his sculptures in Girard, Georgia
- Born: 1925; Burke County, Georgia, U.S.
- Died: 1992 (aged 66–67); Girard, Georgia, U.S.
- Known for: Root Sculpture
- Movement: Modern Art

Ralph Griffin (1925–1992) was an American sculptor known for his sculptures made from tree roots.

== Life ==
Ralph Griffin was born on September 22, 1925, in Girard, Burke County, Georgia on a cotton farm. He began school at Girard Elementary School. He attended school until the ninth grade, then began working full-time on his family's cotton farm. At 22 years old, on January 13, 1947, he married Loretta Gordon, and together they raised five daughters and one son. When he was thirty years old, "'the boll weevils did all of the work' on his family's farm," and Griffin went bankrupt. After leaving the farm, he began to travel, without a specific destination, around the southeast coast of Georgia. After 5–10 years of traveling and working odd construction jobs to support his children, Griffin resettled in Girard, GA, and took a second-shift custodian position at Murray's Biscuit Company. He retained this job for twenty-three years, finally retiring in 1989 to pursue art full-time.

== Career ==
Griffin began making sculptures in 1979 with a piece called Midnight. Midnight is the figure of an anteater, which some believe Griffin was inspired to make because ants were infesting his house, while others believed it was an homage to his midnight return from his shift at the biscuit factory. He was first recognized by an art collector and dealer who had seen his root sculptures displayed in the front yard of his home. His work grew in acclaim from then on, and Griffin retired from his factory job in 1989 to focus on sculpting.

=== Process ===
Griffin's artistic process was inextricably linked to the Savannah River that flowed through the outskirts of his property. It was in this river that Griffin found the roots and drift pieces of Poplar that he used to make his sculptures. He would "take a root from the water, have a thought about it, what it looks like, then [he would] paint it red, black, and white, to put a bit of vision on the root." He always began revealing the essence within the root by finding the eyes. "When I get his eye, I can make him come out of it, then make heads on heads. it seems like a dream until I get it made."

=== Inspiration ===
The roots that Griffin ultimately chose to paint were ones that he believed contained a "deep feeling." To him, these roots were older than the United States and dated back to the days of Noah's flood. Their primordial spirituality was revealed to him through the Savannah River's clear water, which he also believed held atavistic qualities. "There's a miracle in that water, running across them logs since the flood of Noah. Them logs-- they been there since Noah's time, when the flood got out all the water. This is the water from that time."

Unlike his peer, Bessie Harvey, Griffin's sculptures were more confounding and intimidating than whimsical. The gnarled branches make his figures seem contorted and blur the lines between human, animal, and celestial creature. Some of his works depict indistinguishable monstrous or supernatural forms. Others, such as Wizard and Little Wizard, black figures shrouded in what appear to be Klansmen's robes, are a perplexing commentary on semantics and southern race relations. Still others clearly depict the world surrounding Griffin as others also see it, like John Getting Graduated and Woodpecker.

=== Interpretation ===
Many scholars have associated Griffin's artistic process and inspirations with West African animism and religious rituals. Griffin's focus on the purifying, shaping qualities of water and the powers of roots to conjure otherworldly characters is a translation of Kongo and Bakongo spiritual practices. Through black, white, and red paint applications, Griffin "fashioned figures out of tree roots dredged from a river, eliciting the hidden shapes of spirits by way of an idiosyncratic divinatory ritual." Griffin's power to release dormant characters inside of the roots made him known among his neighbors as a conduit or "root doctor." His neighbors would ask him to intuit their dreams or predict winning numbers, but he refused, saying "I don't go that far."

== Exhibitions ==
- Even the Deep Things of God: A Quality of Mind in Afro-Atlantic Traditional Art. 18 Aug.- 30 Sept. 1990. Pittsburgh Center for the Arts.
- Living Traditions: Southern Black Folk Art. 17 Aug- 27 Oct. 1991, The Museum of York County, Rock Hill, SC.
- African-American Folk Art: From the Collection of Dr. A. Everett James. 18 Oct.- 31 Dec. 1991, Van Vechten Gallery at Fisk University, Nashville, TN.
- Passionate Visions of the American South. 1993–1995. Traveling exhibition at various museums.
- Pictured In my Mind: Contemporary American Self-Taught Art from the Collection of Dr. Kurt Gitter and Alice Rae Yelen. 1995, Birmingham Museum of Art, Birmingham, AL.
- Testimony: vernacular art of the African American south: the Ronald and June Shelp Collection. 2001–2004. Traveling exhibition. MI, SC, NY, GA, FL
- The Life and Art of Jimmy Lee Sudduth. 15 Jan.- 27 Mar. 2005. Montgomery Museum of Fine Arts. Montgomery, AL.
- Our Faith Affirmed: Works from the Gordon W. Bailey Collection. 10 Sep.2014- 8 Aug. 2015, University of Mississippi Museum, Oxford, MS.
- A Cut Above: Wood Sculpture from the Gordon W. Bailey Collection. 14 May- 30 Oct. 2016, High Museum of Art, Atlanta, GA.
- Revelations: Art from the African American South. 3 Jun. 2017- 1 Apr. 2018, de Young Gallery at the Fine Arts Museum of San Francisco.
- The Original Makers: Folk Art from the Cargo Collection. 16 Jun.- 30 Dec. 2018, Birmingham Museum of Art. Birmingham, AL.
- Soul of the South. Jul 2018-Jun 2019, Capitol Park Museum, Baton Rouge, LA.

== Permanent collections ==
Griffin's work can be found in the permanent collections of the High Museum of Art and the Fine Arts Museum of San Francisco.
