= Carmen Anhorn =

Swiss soprano (born 1956)

Carmen Anhorn (born 5 August 1956) is a Swiss operatic soprano and mezzo-soprano.

== Life ==
Born in Lucerne, Anhorn studied from 1975 to 1980 at the Musikhochschule Zurich with Sylvia Gähwiller and Carol Smith. From 1980 to 1982, she received her diploma in the opera studio of the Bavarian State Opera Munich lessons from Brigitte Fassbaender. From 1982 to 1988, she was a soloist at the Bavarian State Opera, first as coloratura soprano, especially as soubrette. From 1985 she received wide acclaim from Leonore Kirschstein in Augsburg and from 1987 she performed mainly as a mezzo-soprano.

Anhorn gave guest performances at the Hamburg State Opera, the Deutsche Oper am Rhein, the Alte Oper, La Scala, the Teatro Comunale di Firenze, the Gran Teatre del Liceu Barcelona, the Vlaamse Opera in Antwerp and Ghent, at the Opéra de Nice, the Grand Théâtre de Bordeaux, the Vienna Volksoper, the Teatro Massimo, the Osterfestspiele Salzburg and the Bayreuth Festival. As a concert singer, she has performed at the Bachwoche Ansbach and made guest appearances in several European countries.

Her stage repertoire includes Barbarina and Cherubino in Le nozze di Figaro, Zerlina in Don Giovanni, Despina in Così fan tutte, Papagena in Die Zauberflöte, Amor in Orfeo ed Euridice, Woglinde in Das Rheingold, Musetta in La Bohème, Najade and the composer in Ariadne auf Naxos and Dorella in Das Liebesverbot.

Anhorn can be heard on several CD recordings with parts from Elektra, Feuersnot, The Queen of Spades, Tiefland, Peer Gynt, Rienzi and Iphigénie en Tauride.
