= Étienne-Augustin de Wailly =

French poet (1770–1821)

Étienne-Augustin de Wailly (1 November 1770 – 15 May 1821) was a 19th-century French poet.

The son of the grammarian Noël François de Wailly (1724–1801), he translated three of the four books of the Odes by Horace (Paris, 1817–1818, 3 part. in-18). He collaborated with the Mercure de France (1802-1810). He also authored a Dictionnaire des rimes (1812, in-8).

== Sources ==
- Jacques-Alphonse Mahul, Annuaire nécrologique, ou Supplément annuel et continuation de toutes les biographies ou dictionnaires historiques, 2e année, 1821, Paris : Ponthieu, 1822, (p. 305–306)
