= Noël François de Wailly =

French grammarian and lexicographer (1724–1801)

- Born: 31 July 1724; Amines, France
- Died: 7 April 1801 (aged 76); Paris, France
- Occupations: Lexicographer and grammarian
- Family: Charles de Wailly (brother)

Noël François de Wailly (31 July 1724 – 7 April 1801) was a French grammarian and lexicographer.

== Life ==
He was born at Amiens. He was a student of Joseph Valart and Philippe de Prétot.

Noël François de Wailly spent his life in Paris, where for many years he carried on a school which was extensively patronized by foreigners who wished to learn French. In 1754 he published Principes généraux de la langue française, which revolutionized the teaching of grammar in France. The book was adopted as a textbook by the University of Paris and generally used throughout France, an abstract of it being prepared for primary educational purposes.

In 1771, de Wailly published Moyens simples et raisonnés de diminuer les imperfections de notre orthographe, in which he advocated phonetic spelling. He was a member of the Institute from its foundation (1795), and took an active part in the preparation of the Dictionnaire de l'Académie.

His works, in addition to those cited, include L'Orthographe des dames (1782) and Le Nouveau Vocabulaire français, ou abrégé du dictionnaire de l'Académie (1801).

He was the brother of architect Charles De Wailly and the grandfather of archivist and librarian Natalis de Wailly.
