= Jean-François Lapointe =

Canadian baritone opera singer

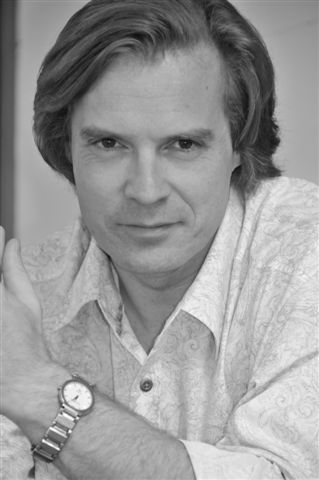
- Born: Saguenay–Lac-Saint-Jean, Quebec, Canada
- Education: Université Laval
- Occupation: Opera singer (baritone)
- Notable work: Title role in Hamlet; Pelléas in Pelléas et Mélisande; Valentin in Faust

Jean-François Lapointe is a Canadian baritone opera singer.

== Career ==
Born in the region of Saguenay–Lac-Saint-Jean, Quebec, Jean-François Lapointe first studied piano and violin and, at the age of 16, devoted himself entirely to singing. He worked under the direction of Louise André at Université Laval in Quebec City, where he obtained a master's degree in Interpretation, before pursuing advanced studies in the United States with Martial Singher. He has received many awards, including three at the prestigious Concours international de chant de Paris.

Since his stage debut at the age of 17, Jean-François Lapointe has sung more than sixty roles in numerous major opera houses around the world. Highly regarded as a lyric baritone for his many major roles in that repertoire, he became famous for his performance of the eponymous role in Ambroise Thomas' Hamlet, in Copenhagen, Trieste and Geneva, as well as of Mercutio (Roméo et Juliette) in Cincinnati, Orange and Tokyo. He also sang the role of Valentin (Faust) a great many times over his career, namely in Turin, Madrid, Monte-Carlo, as well as Orange in August 2008. More recently, he sang the role of Albert (Werther) in the Théatre de la Monnaie in Brussels. Over the past few seasons, Jean-François Lapointe made his debut in the roles of Chorèbe, (Les Troyens) in Geneva, Escamillo, (Carmen), in Lausanne, France and in Japan, and of Zurga, (Les pêcheurs de perles), at the Opera of Toulon, in January 2009.

His performance of Pelléas (2005) in Debussy's Pelléas et Mélisande became a career-defining moment, a role he sang in North America (including Toronto and Cincinnati) as well as Europe: he worked under the direction of Yannis Kokkos in Bordeaux, Toulouse and at la Scala of Milan in November 2005. The Parisian audience saw his Pelléas in June 2007, under the direction of Bernard Haitink, in Théâtre des Champs-Élysées.

Jean-François Lapointe is also known for his dedication at championing neglected operatic works. He thus took part in the première of Bernstein's Candide to a French libretto, and went on to perform the role in France and throughout Europe. He also collaborated to the re-creation of Mârouf, savetier du Caire, at the Opera of Marseille, and to the production of La jolie fille de Perth in Compiègne (France).

Thanks to his stage presence and his acting skills, he achieved great success in the operetta repertoire, performing the roles of Brissac, (Les mousquetaires au couvent), to great acclaim in Toulouse, le Vice-roi du Pérou (la Périchole) in Marseille and Nancy, and especially Danilo, (La veuve joyeuse) in Montréal, Bordeaux, Liège and Lausanne.

Though a noted performer of the French opera repertoire, Jean-François Lapointe also made his mark in the Italian and Russian repertoire: he sang Figaro (Le Barbier de Seville) at the Opéra Comédie, Count Almaviva (Les Noces de Figaro) in Nancy and Don Giovanni in Trieste. He recently added the role of Prince Eletski to his repertoire, in Pikovaya Dama, which he performed at the Opéra de Monte-Carlo with conductor Dmitri Jurowski and stage director Guy Joosten.

== Productions since 2005 ==
=== 2004 ===
- Fieramosca, Benvenuto Cellini, Hector Berlioz, Paris

=== 2005 ===
- Le Vice-Roi du Pérou, La Périchole, J. Offenbach, Montpellier
- Valentin, Faust, C. Gounod, Monaco
- Danilo, The Merry Widow, F. Lehár, Marseille
- Danilo, La Veuve joyeuse, F. Lehár, Bordeaux
- Pelléas, Pelléas et Mélisande, C. Debussy, Glasgow
- Pelléas, Pelléas et Mélisande, C. Debussy, Edimburg
- Pelléas, Pelléas et Mélisande, C. Debussy, Milan
- Andrews, Titanic, M. Yeston, Liège

=== 2006 ===
- Andrews, Titanic, M. Yeston, Charleroi
- Hamlet, Hamlet, A. Thomas, Genève
- Danilo, La Veuve joyeuse, F. Lehár, Liège
- Valentin, Faust, C. Gounod, Liège
- Figaro, Il Barbiere di Siviglia, Rossini, Paris (Opéra-Comique)
- Il Comte Almaviva, Le Nozze di Figaro, W.A. Mozart, Nancy
- Danilo, La Veuve Joyeuse, F. Lehár, Lausanne

=== 2007 ===
- Pelléas, Pelléas et Mélisande, C. Debussy, Toulon
- Pelléas, Pelléas et Mélisande, C. Debussy, Liège
- Don Giovanni, Don Giovanni, W. A. Mozart, Trieste
- Pelléas, Pelléas et Mélisande, C. Debussy, Paris (Théâtre des Champs-Elysées)
- Chorèbe, Les Troyens, H. Berlioz, Genève
- Albert, Werther, J. Massenet, Bruxelles

=== 2008 ===
- Escamillo, Carmen, G. Bizet, Lausanne, Vichy
- Direction musicale, La Belle Hélène, Offenbach, Rimouski (Quebec)
- Valentin, Faust, C. Gounod, Orange
- Escamillo, Carmen, G. Bizet, Japan

=== 2009 ===
- Zurga, Les Pêcheurs de perles, G. Bizet, Toulon
- Claudio, Béatrice et Bénédict, H. Berlioz, Paris (Théâtre des Champs-Elysées)
- Eletski, La Dame de pique, P.I. Tchaikovski, Monaco
- Escamillo, Carmen, G. Bizet, Hyogo, Tokyo, Nagoya
- Pelléas, Pelléas et Mélisande, C. Debussy, Rome
- Landry, Fortunio, A. Messager, Paris (Opéra Comique)

=== 2010 ===
- Ford, Falstaff, G. Verdi, Paris (TCE)
- Chorèbe, Les Troyens, H. Berlioz, Amsterdam
- Énée, Dido and Æneas, H. Purcell, Lausanne, Vichy
- Direction musicale, Carmen, G. Bizet, Rimouski (Quebec)
- Escamillo, Carmen, G. Bizet, Barcelona
- Chorèbe, Les Troyens, H. Berlioz, Berlin

=== 2011 ===
- Don Giovanni, Don Giovanni, W.A. Mozart, Marseille
- Nevers, Les Huguenots, G. Meyerbeer, Bruxelles
- Oreste, Iphigénie en Tauride, C.W. von Glück, Amsterdam
- Eugène Onéguine, Eugene Onegin, P.I. Tchaikovski, Quebec
- Raimbaud, Le Comte Ory, G. Rossini, Genève

=== 2012 ===
- L'Horloge comtoise / Le Chat, L'Enfant et les Sortilèges, M. Ravel, Monaco
- Garrido, La Navarraise, J. Massenet, Monaco
- Ford, Falstaff, G. Verdi, Quebec
- Zurga, Les Pêcheurs de perles, G. Bizet, Amsterdam
- Escamillo, Carmen, G. Bizet, Marseille
- Amrou, Le Mage, J. Massenet, St-Étienne
- Giorgio Germont, La Traviata, G. Verdi, Frankfurt

=== 2013 ===
- Giorgio Germont, La Traviata, G. Verdi, Frankfurt
- Duparquet, Ciboulette, R Hahn, Paris (Opéra Comique)
- Marquis de la Force, Dialogues des Carmélites, F. Poulenc, Toronto
- Marc-Antoine, Cléopâtre, J. Massenet, Marseille
- Le Grand Prêtre, Alceste, C.W. von Glück, Paris (Palais Garnier)
- Alphonse XI, La Favorite, G. Donizetti, Monaco, Paris (Théâtre des Champs-Élysées)

=== 2014 ===
- Albert, Werther, J. Massenet, Paris (Bastille)
- Golaud, Pelléas et Mélisande, C. Debussy, Angers, Nantes
- Le mari, Les Mamelles de Tirésias, F. Poulenc, London (Barbican)
- Giorgio Germont, La Traviata, G. Verdi, Marseille
- Golaud, Pelléas et Mélisande, C. Debussy, Helsinki
- Pharaon, Moïse et Pharaon, G. Rossini, Marseille

=== 2015 ===
- L'Horloge Comtoise / Le Chat, L'Enfant et les Sortilèges, M. Ravel, Stockholm
- L'Horloge Comtoise / Le Chat, L'Enfant et les Sortilèges, M. Ravel, Paris (Philharmonie)
- Valentin, Faust, C. Gounod, Paris (Bastille)
- Germont, La Traviata, G. Verdi, Berlin (Deutsche Oper)
- Hamlet, Hamlet, A. Thomas, Avignon
- Ford, Falstaff, G. Verdi, Marseille
- Guillaume Tell, Guillaume Tell, G. Rossini, Genève
- Marquis de la Force, Dialogues des Carmélites, F. Poulenc, Amsterdam

=== 2016 ===
- Bardi, Dante, B. Godard, Munich, Versailles
- Germont, La Traviata, G. Verdi, Tampa (Floride)
- Siméon, L'Enfant prodigue, C. Debussy + L'Horloge Comtoise / Le Chat, L'Enfant et les Sortilèges, M. Ravel, Paris (Radio France)
- Zurga, Les Pêcheurs de perles, G. Bizet, Nancy
- Enrico, Lucia di Lammermoor, G. Donizetti, Nancy
- Hamlet, Hamlet, A. Thomas, Marseille
- Monsieur Beaucaire, Monsieur Beaucaire, A. Messager, Paris (Opéra Comique)
- Albert, Werther, J. Massenet, Bologne

=== 2017 ===
- Wolfram, Tannhäuser, R. Wagner, Monaco
- Rodrigo, Don Carlo, G. Verdi, Marseille
- Ben, Le Téléphone, GC Menotti, Saint-Eustache (Québec)
- Alphonse XI, La Favorite, G. Donizetti, Marseille
- Benvenuto Cellini, Ascanio, C. Saint-Saëns, Genève
