= John Kentish (tenor) =

British opera singer

John William Kentish (21 January 1910 – 26 October 2006) was an English operatic tenor.

Kentish was born in Blackheath, Kent, and was the elder brother of the painter David Kentish. He was educated at Rugby School and Oriel College, Oxford. He died in Chipping Norton, Oxfordshire, aged 96.
