= Laurent Naouri =

French opera singer

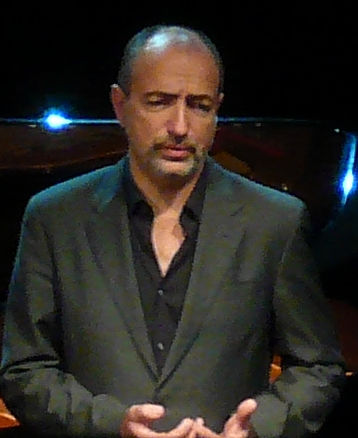

Background information
- Born: 23 May 1964 (age 62); Paris, France
- Genre: opera
- Occupation: opera singer
- Years active: 1992 – present

Laurent Naouri, Chevalier L.H. (born May 23, 1964) is a French bass-baritone. Initially beginning his education at the École Centrale de Lyon, Naouri decided to concentrate on opera in 1986 and continued his musical studies at the Guildhall School of Music and Drama in London, where in his final year in June 1991 he appeared as the Director in Les mamelles de Tirésias.

Naouri was born in Paris. His professional career in France began in 1992 with performances in the title role of Darius Milhaud’s Christophe Colomb (Christopher Columbus) for the opening of the Imperial Theatre in Compiègne. Progressing rapidly, his career quickly comprised a very varied repertoire ranging from Monteverdi to contemporary composers under such conductors as Maurizio Benini, William Christie, René Jacobs, Marc Minkowski, and Kent Nagano.

Naouri made his debut at the Opéra Garnier in the role of Thésée in Rameau's Hippolyte et Aricie, followed by Eugene Onegin at the Opéra de Nancy, interpreting at the Opéra Bastille the roles of the Comte Des Grieux in Massenet's Manon and Figaro in The Marriage of Figaro. A wide range of roles has followed, including many from the Baroque era including Rameau's Platée and Les Indes galantes and Handel's Alcina.

In Britain, he has appeared at the Royal Opera House in 2006 in the role of Escamillo in Carmen; in the United States at the Santa Fe Opera he appeared in the same role in the 2006 Carmen . Also at the Santa Fe Opera, he is scheduled for the role of Falstaff in Verdi's opera of the same name for June/July 2008 and as Germont in the 2009 La traviata starring his wife as Violetta.

Naouri made his Metropolitan Opera debut as Sharpless in Madama Butterfly in 2012. In the Metropolitan Opera Live in HD series, he appeared as Capulet in Gounod's Roméo et Juliette in 2017, as Pandolfe in Massenet's Cendrillon in 2018 (and the English version Cinderella in 2022), and as the High Priest in Samson et Dalila by Saint-Saëns in 2018. He also was the Marquis de la Force at the Met in Poulenc's Dialogues of the Carmelites in 2023.

Naouri is married to soprano Natalie Dessay, and they have two children.

== Selected recordings ==
Among his wide-ranging discography are: Saturne and Protée in Lully's Phaëton (1994), Pluton, Neptune and Jupiter in Rameau's Hippolyte et Aricie (1995) and as Thésée (1997), Lucifero in Handel's oratorio La Resurrezione (1996), Gaveston in Boieldieu's La Dame Blanche (1997), Jupiter in Offenbach's Orphée aux enfers (1998 - also video), Polyphème in Lully's Acis et Galatée (1998), Hidraot in Gluck's Armide (1999), Anténor in Rameau's Dardanus (2000), Claudio in Berlioz's Béatrice et Bénédict (2002), Balducci in Berlioz's Benvenuto Cellini (2004), and the title role in Donizetti's Le duc d'Albe (2016).
