= Diapason d'Or =

Music award by magazine Diapason

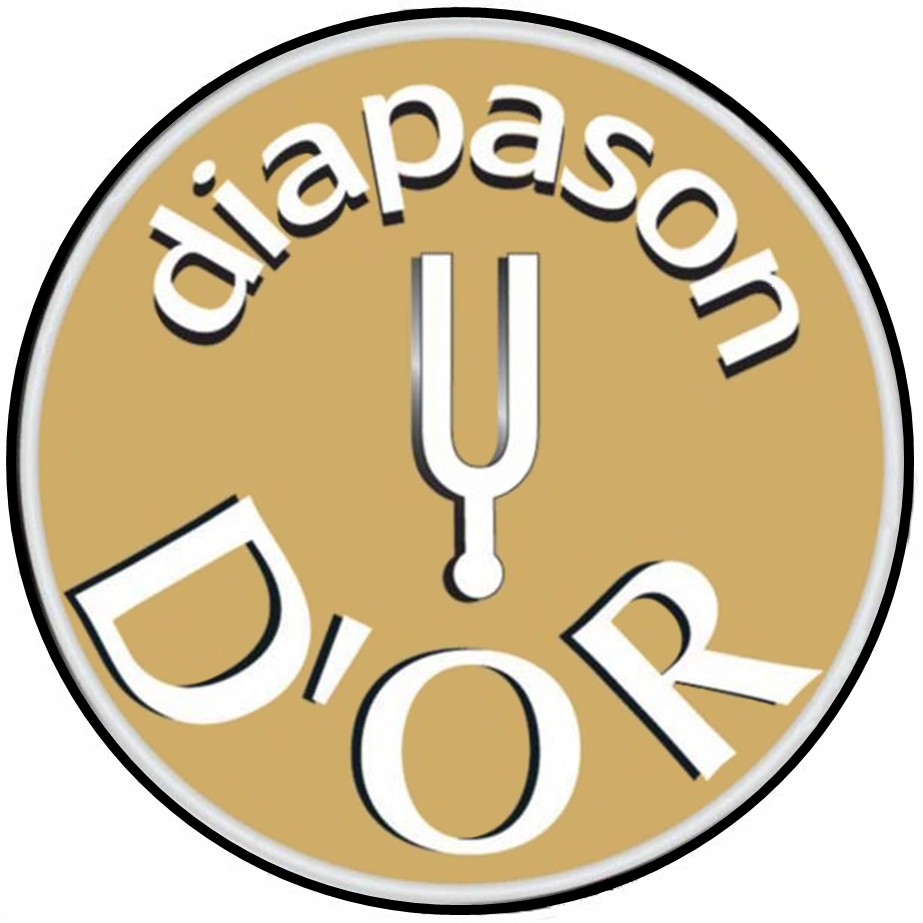
Logo of Diapason d'or

The Diapason d'Or (French for "Golden Tuning Fork") is a recommendation of outstanding (mostly) classical music recordings given by reviewers of Diapason magazine in France, broadly equivalent to "Editor's Choice", "Disc of the Month" in the British Gramophone magazine.

The Diapason d'Or de l'Année (French: [djapasɔ̃ d‿ɔʁ də l‿ane]; English: "Golden Tuning Fork of the Year") is a more prestigious award, decided by a jury comprising critics from Diapason and broadcasters from France Musique, and is comparable to the United Kingdom's Gramophone Awards, associated with the Gramophone magazine.

== Diapason d'Or de l'année 2007 ==
- Philippe Jaroussky: Vivaldi Opera Arias. Jean-Christophe Spinosi, Ensemble Matheus. Virgin Classics

== Diapason d'Or de l'année 2008 ==
- Marc-André Hamelin: Charles-Valentin Alkan, Concerto for solo piano; Troisième recueil de chants. Hyperion Records
- Jean-Guihen Queyras J. S. Bach, Cello Suites. Harmonia Mundi
- Masaaki Suzuki: J. S. Bach, Mass in B minor, Peter Kooy, Carolyn Sampson, BIS
- Ensemble Pygmalion: J. S. Bach, Missae Breves, BWV 234 & 235. Alpha
- Rafał Blechacz: Chopin, Préludes. DG
- Pierre Hantaï: François Couperin, Pièces de clavecin. Mirare
- Jean-Efflam Bavouzet: Debussy Complete Works for Piano, Vol. 2. Chandos
- Jean-Guihen Queyras and Alexandre Tharaud: Debussy & Poulenc – Cello Sonatas. Harmonia Mundi
- Pierre-André Valade (conductor), Hugues Dufourt Le Cyprès Blanc Luxembourg Philharmonic Orchestra, Gérard Caussé (viola). Timpani
- Bruno Cocset, Luca Pianca, and Les Basses Réunies: Francesco Geminiani, Sonatas for violoncello with basso continuo. Alpha
- Jiří Bělohlávek: Janáček, The Excursions of Mr. Brouček, BBC Symphony Orchestra, DG
- Jerusalem Quartet: Schubert, Der Tod und das Mädchen. Harmonia Mundi
- Leif Segerstam: Sibelius, Kullervo. Soile Isokoski, Tommi Hakala, YL Male Voice Choir. Ondine.
- Mala Punica. Faventina: The liturgical music of Codex Faenza 117. Ambroisie
- Historical Marcelle Meyer: Complete EMI recordings 1925–1957, EMI Classics (France)
- Measha Brueggergosman: Surprise Cabaret Songs, DG
- DVD Patrice Chéreau (director) Janáček, From the House of the Dead cond. Pierre Boulez. DG

== Diapason d'Or de l'Année 2009 ==
- Concerto Award – Thomas Zehetmair, Bernd Alois Zimmermann Canto Di Speranza WDR Sinfonieorchester Köln ECM 4766885
- Jonas Kaufmann; "Romantic Arias" Prague Philharmonic Orchestra, Marco Armiliato, Decca 4759966
- Magdalena Kožená; Martinů : Julietta, Czech Philharmonic, Charles Mackerras Supraphon SU3994
- Jerusalem Quartet; Haydn: Quartets op. 20 n°5, op. 33 n°3 "L'Oiseau" op. 76 n°5 Harmonia Mundi
- Bernard Haitink; Bruckner: Symphony No.8. Mozart: Symphonie N.38 Sächsische Staatskapelle Dresden. Profil PH07057
- Philippe Herreweghe; Lassus: Cantiones sacrae. Collegium Vocale Gent. Harmonia Mundi
- Nikolaus Harnoncourt; Joseph Haydn: The Seasons. DHM
- Alexandre Tharaud, piano; Satie: "Avant Dernières Pensées". Harmonia Mundi
- Viktoria Mullova and Giuliano Carmignola; Vivaldi: Concertos pour deux violons. Archiv Produktion.
- Opera Award – Jean-Christophe Spinosi, Vivaldi: La fida ninfa. soloists, Ensemble Matheus. Naïve OP30410
- Mark Padmore, tenor; Britten: Songs. Roger Vignoles (piano). Harmonia Mundi
- Jordi Savall; "Jerusalem". Hesperion XXI, La Capella Reial de Catalunya. Alia Vox AVSA9865
- Iván Fischer; Mahler: Symphonie n° 4. Miah Persson (soprano), Budapest Festival Orchestra. Channel Classics CCSSA26109
- Rachel Podger; Mozart: Sonates pour violon et clavier, Vol. VII et VIII. Gary Cooper (pianoforte and clavecin). Channel Classics CCSSA28109
- Cecilia Bartoli; "Sacrificium". Il Giardino Armonico, Giovanni Antonini. Decca 47815221
- Project Award – Villa-Lobos; Chôros cycle. John Neschling, BIS

== Diapason d'Or de l'Année 2010 ==
- Artist of the year Jonas Kaufmann; Schubert, Die schöne Müllerin, Helmut Deutsch, Decca
- Marc Minkowski; Haydn, London Symphonies, Les Musiciens du Louvre-Grenoble, Naïve
- Isabelle Faust; J. S. Bach, Violin sonatas and partitas, Harmonia Mundi
- Simon Trpčeski, Rachmaninov, Piano Concertos No.2 and 3, Vasily Petrenko, Avie
- Nelson Freire, Chopin, Nocturnes, Decca
- Pavel Haas Quartet, Prokofiev, Quartets, Supraphon
- Pražák Quartet, Shostakovich, Quartets, Evgeni Koroliov, Praga
- Philippe Jaroussky, J. C. Bach, Arias La dolce fiamma, Virgin Classics
- Sergio Azzolini, Vivaldi, Concertos for bassoon, L'aura soave, Naïve
- Christophe Rousset, Louis Couperin, Pièces de clavecin, Aparté
- Masaaki Suzuki, J. S. Bach, Motets, Bach Collegium Japan, BIS
- Contemporary – Thierry Pécou, Jaguar symphony, Ensemble Zellig, Harmonia Mundi
- Historical – Olivier Greif, Le rêve du monde, INA mémoire vive
- Debut – Vittorio Grigolo, The Italian Tenor, Sony Classics

== Diapason d'Or de l'Année 2011 ==
- I Fagiolini, Robert Hollingworth: Striggio, Ecce beatam lucem. Missa Ecco si beato Giorno, Decca (CD).
- Christian Tetzlaff (violin), Wiener Philharmoniker, Pierre Boulez: Szymanowski, Violin Concerto No. 1, Symphony No. 3. Deutsche Grammophon (CD).
- Monteverdi Choir, English Baroque Soloists, John Eliot Gardiner: Bach, Cantates, vol. II et XIII. Soli Deo Gloria (CD).
- Café Zimmermann: Bach, Concerts pour plusieurs instruments, vol. V et VI. Alpha (CD).
- Amandine Beyer (violin): Bach, Sonates et Partitas. Zig Zag Territoires (CD).
- Lahti Symphony Orchestra, Okko Kamu: Sibelius, La Tempête, Le Barde, Tapiola. BIS (CD).
- Vadim Gluzman (violin), Andrew Litton: Bruch, Violin Concerto No. 1, String Quintet. BIS (CD).
- Joyce DiDonato (mezzo-soprano): Diva-Divo. EMI (CD).
- Stephen Hough (piano): Chopin, Valses. Hyperion (CD).
- Quatuor Diotima: Reich, Barber, Crumb, String Quartets. Naïve (CD).
- Ivry Gitlis (violin): Live Performances, Vol. 1. Doremi (CD).
- Young Talent: Julia Lezhneva (soprano): Rossini Airs d'opéras. Naïve.
- Diapason reader's choice and France Musique listeners: Emmanuelle Bertrand (cello): Le violoncelle parle. Harmonia Mundi.
- Jonas Kaufmann (Werther); Michel Plasson/Benoît Jacquot: Massenet, Werther. Decca (DVD).
- Magdalena Kožená (mezzo-soprano); Lucerne Festival Orchestra, Claudio Abbado: Mahler, Symphonie no 4, Rückert-Lieder. EuroArts (DVD).
- Karita Mattila (Katia); Jiri Belohlavek/Robert Carsen: Janáček, Katia Kabanova. Framusica (DVD).

== Diapason d'Or de l'Année 2014 ==
- Musique symphonique: Schmitt: Le Petit Elfe Ferme-l'œil, Introït, récit et congé, Aline Martin (mezzo-soprano), Henri Demarquette (cello), Orchestre national de Lorraine, Jacques Mercier. Timpani (CD). Mozart: Symphonies Nos. 39, 40 and 41. Orchestra of the Eighteenth Century, Frans Brüggen. Glossa (CD).
- Lied: Eisler: Ernste Gesänge, Lieder with piano, Sonata for piano op. 1, Matthias Goerne (baritone), Thomas Larcher (piano), Ensemble Resonanz. Harmonia Mundi (CD).
- Opéra: R. Strauss: Elektra, Evelyn Herlitzius, Waltraud Meier, Adrianne Pieczonka, Mikhail Petrenko, Tom Randle, Orchestre de Paris, Esa-Pekka Salonen. Bel Air (DVD ou Blu-ray).
- Piano: Busoni: Late Piano Music, Marc-André Hamelin (piano). Hyperion (3 CD).
- Récital lyrique: "Stella di Napoli", Pacini, Bellini, Rossini, Mercadante, Carafa, Donizetti, Valentini, Joyce DiDonato (mezzo-soprano), Opéra National de Lyon Orchestra and Choir, Riccardo Minasi. Erato (CD).
- Opéra: Adams: Nixon in China, James Maddalena, Janis Kelly, Robert Brubaker, Kathleen Kim, Russell Braun, Richard Paul Fink, Metropolitan Opera Orchestra and Choir, John Adams. Nonesuch (DVD + Blu-ray).
- Oratorio: Bach: St Matthew Passion, Mark Padmore, Christian Gerhaher, Camilla Tilling, Magdalena Kožená, Topi Lehtipuu, Thomas Quasthoff, Rundfunkchor Berlin, Berliner Philharmoniker, Simon Rattle, Simon Halsey. BPHR (2 DVD ou 1 Blu-ray).
- Soliste instrumental: Ysaye: The Complete Sonatas for Solo Violin, Op 27; Sonata for Two Violins, Tedi Papavrami, Svetlin Roussev (violins). Zig-Zag Territoires (2 CD).
- Opéra: Wagner: Parsifal, Jonas Kaufmann, Peter Mattei, René Pape, Katarina Dalayman, Evgeny Nikitin, Metropolitan Opera Orchestra and Choir, Daniele Gatti. Sony (2 DVD ou 1 Blu-ray).
- Piano: "Dances", Benjamin Grosvenor (piano). Decca (CD).
- Musique baroque vocale: Rameau: "Le Grand Théâtre de l'amour", Sabine Devieilhe (soprano), Samuel Boden (tenor), Aimery Lefèvre (baritone), Le Jeune Choeur de Paris, Les Ambassadeurs, Alexis Kossenko. Erato (CD).
- Musique contemporaine: Benjamin: Written on Skin, Barbara Hannigan, Christopher Purves, Bejun Mehta, Victoria Simmonds, Allan Clayton, Covent Garden Orchestra, George Benjamin. Opus Arte (DVD ou Blu-ray).
- Musique symphonique : "Universe of Sound" Holst: The Planets, Talbot: Worlds, Stars, Systems, Infinity, Philharmonia Orchestra, Esa-Pekka Salonen. Signum Vision (DVD).
- Musique ancienne: "Les Trésors de Claude le Jeune", Extraits du Livre de mélanges (1585), Huelgas Ensemble, Paul Van Nevel. DHM (CD).
- Musique baroque instrumentale: C.P.E. Bach: Concertos for cello and orchestra Wq 170 et 172. Sinfonia Wq 182. Trio Sonata Wq 161 "Sanguineus & Melancholicus", Ophélie Gaillard (cello), Pulcinella Orchestra. Aparté (CD).
- Projet artistique: "Refuge In Music, Terezin-Theresienstadt", Svenk, I. Weber, Dauber, Taube, Ullmann, Schulhoff, Roman, Haas, Berman and Bach. Documentaire de Dorothee Binding et Benedict Mirow. Anne Sofie von Otter (mezzo-soprano), Daniel Hope (violin), Bepe Risenfors (accordion, contrabass, guitar), Bengt Forsberg (piano). DG (DVD).
- Rééditions: Maria Callas Remastered Edition. Warner (69 CD + 1 CD-rom).

== Diapason d'Or de l'Année 2015 ==
- Artiste de l'année/Artist of the Year: Paavo Järvi, Schumann: Symphony No. 4 (2nd Version), Deutsche Kammerphilharmonie Bremen, Paavo Järvi. RCA (CD). Dutilleux: Métaboles, Sur le même accord, Symphony No. 1, Christian Tetzlaff (violin), Orchestre de Paris, Paavo Järvi. Erato (CD). Beethoven: Overtures, Deutsche Kammerphilharmonie Bremen, Paavo Järvi. RCA (CD). Shostakovich: Symphony No. 7 "Leningrad", Russian National Orchestra, Paavo Järvi. Pentatone (SACD).
- Baroque Instrumental: Boccherini: Cello Concerto, Quintet for guitar, Sextet with flute, Quintet with flute, Manuel Granatiero (flute), Marco Ceccato (cello), Francesco Romano (guitar), Accademia Ottoboni. Zig-Zag Territoires (CD). Caldara: Trio Sonatas, Amandine Beyer, Leila Schayegh (violins), Jonathan Pesek (cello), Jörg-Andreas Bötticher (harpsichord and organ), Matthias Spaeter (theorbo). Glossa (CD).
- Baroque Vocal: Delalande: Leçons de ténèbres, Miserere, Sophie Karthäuser, Ensemble Correspondances. HM (CD).
- Musique De Chambre: Brahms: Sonatas for Clarinet and Piano, Trio for clarinet, cello and piano, Raphaël Sévère (clarinet), Victor Julien-Laferrière (cello), Adam Laloum (piano). Mirare (CD). Berg: Lyric Suite, Mendelssohn : String Quartet op. 13. Tetzlaff Quartet. Avi-Music (CD).
- Récital Vocal: Julie Fuchs: "Yes!", Orchestre National de Lille, Samuel Jean. DG (CD).
- Musique Symphonique: Lutoslawski: Piano Concerto, Symphony No. 2, Krystian Zimerman (piano), Berlin Philharmonic, Simon Rattle. DG (CD)
- Opéra: Steffani: Niobe, regina di Tebe, Karina Gauvin, Philippe Jaroussky, Amanda Forsythe, Christian Immler..., Boston Early Music Festival Orchestra, Paul O'Dette & Stephen Stubbs. Erato (3 CD). Verdi: Aida, Anja Harteros, Jonas Kaufmann, Ekaterina Semenchuk, Ludovic Tézier..., Choir and Orchestra dell'Accademia Nazionale di Santa Cecilia, Antonio Pappano. Warner (3 CD).
- Musique Chorale: Messiaen: "L'Amour et la Foi", Danish National Vocal Ensemble, Danish National Concert Choir, Danish National Chamber Orchestra, Marcus Creed. OUR Recordings (SACD).
- Musique Contemporaine: Rihm: Et Lux, Huelgas Ensemble, Minguet Quartet, Paul Van Nevel. ECM (CD).
- Réédition: Pierre Monteux: "The Complete RCA Album Collection". Sony (40 CD).
- DVD: "El Sistema at Salzburg Festival", Gershwin, Mahler, Bernstein..., National Children's Symphony Orchestra of Venezuela, Simon Rattle... CMajor (DVD or Blu-ray).
- Jeune Talent/Young talent: Bach: Partita No. 4, Capriccio BWV 992, English Suite No. 1, Toccata BWV 911, Rémi Geniet (piano). Mirare (CD).

== Diapason d'Or de l'Année 2016 ==
- Baroque Instrumental: Bach: Six Sonatas for Violin and Harpsichord BWV 1014–1019, Leila Schayegh (violin), Jörg Halubek (harpsichord). Glossa (2 CD). Visée: Pieces for Theorbo, Corbetta: Pieces for Guitar, Rolf Lislevand (theorbo and guitar). ECM (CD).
- Baroque Vocal, Zelenka: Missa Divi Xaverii, Litanies, Collegium 1704, Václav Luks. Accent (CD).
- Musique de Chambre: Beethoven: Sonatas Op. 47 "Kreutzer", Op. 23 and Op. 12 No 2, Lorenzo Gatto (violin), Julien Libeer (piano). Alpha (CD). Brahms: String Quartets & Piano Quintet, Belcea Quartet, Till Fellner (piano). Alpha (2 CD).
- Récital Vocal: "Verismo", Airs Et Extraits D'opéras De Cilea, Giordano, Puccini, Leoncavalo, Catalani, Boito, Ponchielli, Anna Netrebko (soprano), Choir and Orchestra dell'Accademia Nazionale di Santa Cecilia, Antonio Pappano. Deutsche Grammophon (CD).
- Musique Symphonique: Mahler: Symphony No. 6, Bavarian Radio Symphony Orchestra, Daniel Harding. BR Klassik (CD). Beethoven: The 9 Symphonies (Audio and Video), Soloists, Berlin Radio Choir, Berlin Philharmonic, Simon Rattle. BPHR (5 CD and 3 Blu-Ray).
- Première au Disque: Honegger/Ibert: L'Aiglon, Anne-Catherine Gillet, Marc Barrard, Étienne Dupuis, Pascal Charbonneau, Hélène Guilmette, Marie-Nicole Lemieux..., Montreal Symphony Orchestra and Choir, Kent Nagano. Decca (2 CD).
- Harpsichord: Scarlatti: Sonatas for Harpsichord, Vol. IV, Pierre Hantaï (harpsichord). Mirare (CD).
- Concerto: Mozart: Concertos for Piano KV 413, 414 and 415, Kristian Bezuidenhout (piano), Freiburger Barockorchester, Gottfried von der Goltz. Harmonia Mundi (CD).
- Piano: Chopin: 24 Mazurkas, Pavel Kolesnikov (piano). Hyperion (Cd).
- Musique Contemporaine: Connesson: Flammenschrift, Pour sortir au jour, E chiaro nella valle il fiume appare, Maslenitsa, Mathieu Dufour (flute), Brussels Philharmonic, Stéphane Denève. Deutsche Grammophon (CD). Abrahamsen: Let Me Tell You, Barbara Hannigan (soprano), Bavarian Radio Symphony Orchestra, Andris Nelsons. Winter & Winter (CD).
- Réédition: "Le Siècle De Menuhin", Warner Classic (80 CD + 11 DVD).

== Diapason d'Or de l'Année 2017 ==
- Musique Ancienne: Dowland: Lachrimae, or Seaven Teares, Elizabeth Kenny (lute), Phantasm
- Musique Baroque: Telemann – Music for Recorder, Giovanni Antonini (recorder/director), Il Giardino Armonico
- Violon: JS Bach: Sonatas & Partitas for solo violin, Christian Tetzlaff (violin)
- Piano: Volodos plays Brahms, Arcadi Volodos (piano). Lyapunov: Piano Works, Vol. 2, Florian Noack (piano)
- Musique de Chambre: Wiener Klassik: The Unusual Instrumentation, Die Freitagsakademie. Dvořák : Piano Trios, Op. 65 & 90, Trio Wanderer. Brahms, Franck & Debussy: Cello Sonatas, Victor Julien-Laferrière (cello), Adam Laloum (piano)
- Musique Symphonique: Mendelssohn: A Midsummer Night's Dream, Ceri-Lyn Cissone, Alexander Knox & Frankie Wakefield (narrators); London Symphony Orchestra & Monteverdi Choir, Sir John Eliot Gardiner
- Musique Sacrée: Dvořák: Stabat Mater, Eri Nakamura (soprano), Elisabeth Kulman (contralto), Michael Spyres (tenor), Jongmin Park (bass); Czech Philharmonic Orchestra, Prague Philharmonic Choir, Jiří Bělohlávek
- Musique Chorale: MacMillan: Stabat Mater, The Sixteen, Britten Sinfonia, Harry Christophers
- Musique Contemporaine: Rihm, Dusapin and Mantovani: Violin Concertos, Renaud Capuçon (violin), Wiener Symphoniker, Orchestre Philharmonique de Radio France, Orchestre de l'Opéra national de Paris, Philippe Jordan, Myung-Whun Chung
- Opéra: Glinka: Ruslan and Lyudmila, Albina Shagimuratova (Lyudmila), Mikhail Petrenko (Ruslan), Yuri Minenko (Ratmir); Bolshoi Theatre, Vladimir Jurowski, Dmitri Tcherniakov. Philip Glass: Einstein on the Beach, Helga Davis, Kate Moran, Antoine Silverman; The Philip Glass Ensemble, Michael Riesman, Robert Wilson (director), Lucinda Childs (choreographer)
- Archives: Rudolf Serkin: The Complete Columbia Album Collection, Rudolf Serkin (piano)

== Diapason d'Or de l'Année 2018 ==
- Musique ancienne: Parle qui veut, Moralizing songs of the Middle Ages, Sollazzo Ensemble
- Musique baroque instrumentale: J S Bach: Concerto for Two Harpsichords, Pierre Hantaï, Aapo Häkkinen (harpsichords), Helsinki Baroque Orchestra
- Musique baroque instrumentale: Louis Couperin: Suites for Harpsichord, Christophe Rousset (harpsichord Ioannes Couchet du Musée des Instruments)
- Musique baroque vocale: Perpetual Night, 17th-Century Ayres and Songs, Lucile Richardot (contralto), Ensemble Correspondances, Sébastien Daucé
- Piano: Beethoven: Piano Sonatas Nos. 14 & 29, Murray Perahia (piano)
- Piano: Scriabin: Preludes, Etudes & Sonatas Nos. 4 & 5, Vadym Kholodenko (piano)
- Musique de chambre: Es war einmal... (Once Upon a Time...), Fairy Tales by Robert Schumann & Jörg Widmann, Jörg Widmann (clarinet), Tabea Zimmermann (viola) & Dénes Várjon (piano)
- Concerto: C.P.E. Bach: Cello Concertos, Jean-Guihen Queyras (cello), Ensemble Resonanz, Riccardo Minasi
- Concerto: Bartók: Violin Concerto No. 1 & Enescu: Octet for strings, Vilde Frang (violin), Erik Schumann (violin), Gabriel Le Magadure (violin), Roseanne Philippens (violin), Lawrence Power (viola), Lily Francis (viola), Nicolas Altstaedt (cello), Jan-Erik Gustavsson (cello); Orchestre de Radio France, Mikko Franck
- Mélodie: Chimère, Sandrine Piau (soprano), Susan Manoff (piano)
- Lied: Schubert: Die schöne Müllerin, Christian Gerhaher (baritone), Gerold Huber (piano)
- Symphonique: Elgar: Falstaff, Orchestral Songs; Grania and Diarmid, Roderick Williams (baritone), BBC Philharmonic, Sir Andrew Davis
- Opéra: Britten: Billy Budd (DVD), Jacques Imbrailo (Billy Budd), Toby Spence (Vere), Brindley Sherratt (Claggart), Thomas Oliemans (Redburn), David Soar (Flint), Torben Jürgens (Ratcliffe), Clive Bayley (Dansker), Duncan Rock (Donald), Francisco Vas (Squeak); Teatro Real Madrid, Ivor Bolton, Deborah Warner
- Opéra: Britten: Billy Budd (Blu-ray)
- Choral: J S Bach: Motets, The Norwegian Soloists’ Choir, Ensemble Allegria, Grete Pedersen
- Jeune talent: Miroir(s), Elsa Dreisig (soprano), Orchestre national Montpellier Occitanie Pyrénées Méditerranée, Michael Schønwandt
- Archives: Debussy: The Complete Works, Artists include Martha Argerich, Pierre-Laurent Aimard, Samson François, Renaud Capuçon, Natalie Dessay, André Cluytens, François-Xavier Roth, Jean Martinon, Michel Plasson, Kent Nagano and Carlo Maria Giulini

== Diapason d'Or de l'Année 2019 ==
- Artiste de l'année: Riccardo Chailly, The Fellini Album, Filarmonica della Scala, Riccardo Chailly, Strauss: Also Sprach Zarathustra, Tod und Verklärung, Till Eulenspiegel & Salome's Dance, Lucerne Festival Orchestra, Riccardo Chailly
- Musique ancienne: La Morte della Ragione, Il Giardino Armonico, Giovanni Antonini
- Clavecin: Domenico Scarlatti: Sonatas, Jean Rondeau (harpsichord)
- Baroque instrumental: Johann Sebastian Bach: Concertos for Organ and Strings, Bart Jacobs (organ), Les Muffatti
- Baroque instrumental: Dandrieu/Corelli: Opus 1, Le Consort: Theotime Langois de Swarte, Sophie de Bardonneche, Louise Pierrard, Hanna Salzenstein, Justin Taylor
- Baroque vocal: Cozzolani: Vespro, I Gemelli, Emiliano Gonzalez Toro
- Piano: Destination Rachmaninov – Departure, Daniil Trifonov (piano), Philadelphia Orchestra, Yannick Nézet-Séguin
- Piano: Prokofiev: Piano Sonatas Nos. 2 & 5, Lukas Geniušas (piano)
- Concerto: Saint-Saëns: Piano Concertos 3, 4 & 5 'L'Égyptien', Alexandre Kantorow (piano), Tapiola Sinfonietta, Jean-Jacques Kantorow
- Musique de chambre: Shostakovich: String Quartet Nos. 5, 7 & Piano Quintet, Elisabeth Leonskaja (piano), Artemis Quartet
- Symphonique: Haydn: Die sieben letzten Worte unseres Erlösers am Kreuze, Ensemble Rezonanz, Juditha Haberlin
- Récital vocal: Offenbach Colorature, Jodie Devos (soprano), Münchner Rundfunkorchester, Laurent Campellone
- Musique d'aujourd'hui: Contemporary Clarinet Concertos, Magnus Lindberg, Karl Amadeus Hartmann, Johan Farjot, Jean-Luc Votano (clarinet), Quatuor Danel, Orchestre Philharmonique Royal de Liège
- Opéra: Chabrier: L’Étoile (DVD) Stéphanie d'Oustrac (Lazuli), Christophe Mortagne (King Ouf), Hélène Guilmette (Princess Laoula), Jérôme Varnier (Siroco), Julie Boulianne (Aloès), François Piolino (Tapioca), Elliot Madore (Prince Hérisson de Porc-Epic)
- Opéra:Chabrier: L’Étoile (Blu-ray)
