= Ariodante =

1735 opera by George Frideric Handel

- Opera by George Frideric Handel
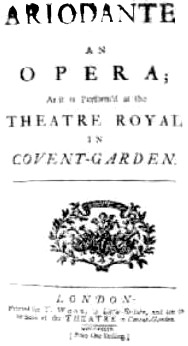
- Title page of original printed edition
- Librettist: anonymous
- Language: Italian
- Based on: Ariosto's Orlando Furioso
- Premiere: 8 January 1735; Covent Garden Theatre, London

Ariodante (HWV 33) is an opera seria in three acts by George Frideric Handel. The anonymous Italian libretto was based on a work by Antonio Salvi, which in turn was adapted from Canti 4, 5 and 6 of Ludovico Ariosto's Orlando Furioso. Each act contains opportunities for dance, originally composed for dancer Marie Sallé and her company.

The opera was first performed in the Covent Garden Theatre, London, on 8 January 1735. Ariodante opened Handel's first season at Covent Garden and successfully competed against the rival Opera of the Nobility, supported by the Prince of Wales. Handel had the tacit and financial support of the King and Queen and, more vocally, of the Princess Royal. The opera received 11 performances during its premiere season at Covent Garden.

Like Handel's other works in the opera seria genre, Ariodante, despite its initial success, fell into oblivion for nearly two hundred years. An edition of the score was published in the early 1960s, from the Hallische Händel-Ausgabe. In the 1970s, the work began to be revived, and has come to be considered one of Handel's finest operas. On 29 March 1971, the Handel Society of New York performed the American premiere of the work in a concert version with mezzo-soprano Sophia Steffan in the title role and Judith Raskin as Ginevra.

Charles Cudworth has discussed the influence of French dance music in the opera. Winton Dean has noted that Act 2 of the opera, in its original version, is the only act in a Handel opera which ends with accompanied recitative.

== Background ==
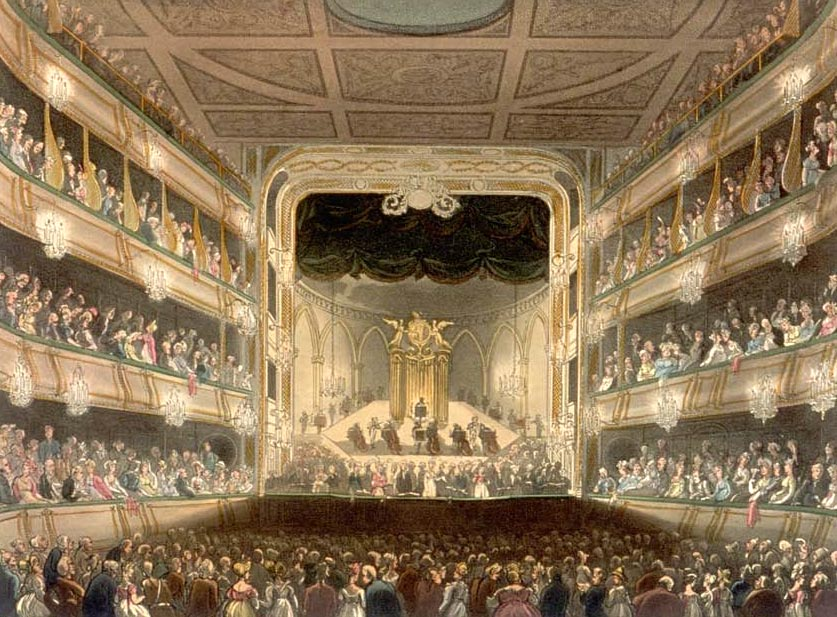
Interior, Theatre Royal, Covent Garden, where Ariodante was first performed

The German-born Handel had brought Italian opera to London stages for the first time in 1711 with his opera Rinaldo. An enormous success, Rinaldo created a craze in London for Italian opera seria, a form focused overwhelmingly on solo arias for the star virtuoso singers. Handel had presented new operas in London for years with great success. One of the major attractions in Handel's operas was the star castrato Senesino whose relationship with the composer was often stormy and who eventually left Handel's company to appear with the rival Opera of the Nobility, set up in 1733. Handel moved to another theatre, Covent Garden, and engaged different singers. The new theatre at Covent Garden, run by impresario John Rich, added the attraction of a troupe of dancers led by the celebrated Marie Sallé, so Handel's two new operas for 1735, Ariodante and Alcina both include dance sequences, for the first time in Handel opera for London. The singers for whom Handel wrote "Ariodante" included a young soprano, Cecilia Young, whom he had not worked with before, considered by contemporary musicologist Charles Burney to be the finest English soprano of the day, and the virtuoso castrato Carestini, whose astonishing technique and huge vocal range Handel made full use of, especially in the scena "E vivo ancora? E senza il ferro? oh Dei!…Scherza infida in grembo al drudo" and in the jubilant and bravura "Dopo notte, atra e funesta".

== Roles ==
Roles, voice types, and premiere cast
| Role | Voice type | Premiere cast, 8 January 1735 |
|---|---|---|
| Ariodante, a vassal prince | mezzo-soprano castrato | Giovanni Carestini |
| Ginevra, daughter of the King of Scotland, betrothed to Ariodante | soprano | Anna Maria Strada del Pò |
| Dalinda, attendant on Ginevra, secretly in love with Polinesso | soprano | Cecilia Young |
| Polinesso, Duke of Albany, also in love with Ginevra | contralto | Maria Caterina Negri |
| Lurcanio, Ariodante's brother, in love with Dalinda | tenor | John Beard |
| Rè di Scozia (King of Scotland) | bass | Gustavus Waltz |
| Odoardo, favorite of the king | tenor | Michael Stoppelaer |

== Synopsis ==
Medieval Scotland. Ginevra, daughter of the King, is in love with and betrothed to Prince Ariodante. She rejects the amorous advances of the Duke of Albany, Polinesso, who then cruelly tricks Ariodante and Ginevra's father into believing that Ginevra has been unfaithful. Ariodante attempts suicide and Ginevra is condemned, but after a challenge to a duel by Lurcanio, Ariodante's brother, the dying Polinesso admits his plot and the lovers are reunited.

=== Act 1 ===
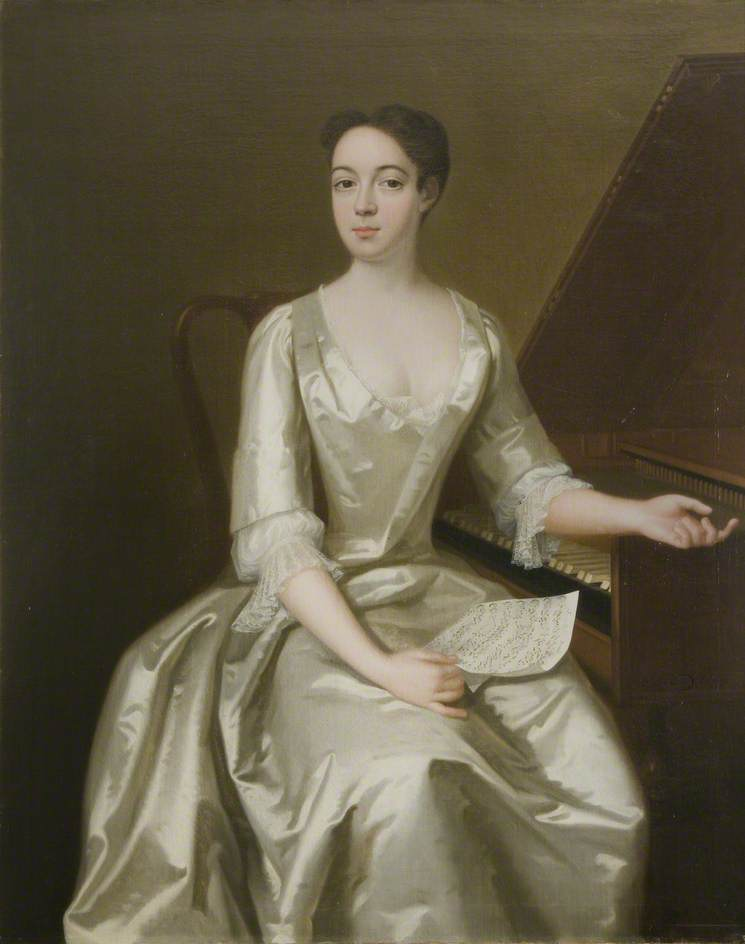
Anna Maria Strada, who created the role of Ginevra, by John Verelst (circa 1732)

The royal cabinet, in the palace

Princess Ginevra, in front of her mirror, is adorning herself to make herself beautiful for her beloved. (Aria: Vezze, lusinghe). Polinesso, Duke of Albany, bursts into the room and, thinking that having the king's daughter as his sweetheart would advance his prospects, declares his love for her. Ginevra indignantly rejects him (Aria: Orrida a gl'occhi miei) and leaves. Dalinda, who is secretly in love with Polinesso, advises him that his rival is Prince Ariodante but also advises him that all he has to do is open his eyes to see someone else who loves him (Aria: Apri le luci). Left alone, Polinesso can see that Dalinda is in love with him and plans to use her to thwart his rival and win Ginevra for himself (Aria: Coperta la frode).

The royal gardens

Ariodante sings of how all nature speaks to him of love (Aria: Quì d'amor). Ginevra joins him and they pledge their love (Duet: Prendi, prendi da questa mano). The King joins the lovers, gives them his blessing, and Ginevra is overjoyed (Aria: Volate, amori). The king orders his courtier Odoardo to make the preparations for the wedding (Aria: Voli colla sua tromba). Alone, Ariodante swears to be faithful to Ginevra (Aria: Con l'ali di costanza). Polinesso hatches his plot – he tells Dalinda that if she will dress as Ginevra that evening and invite him into her apartments, he will be hers (Aria: Spero per voi). Lurcanio, Ariodante's brother, then appears to Dalinda and declares his love for her (Aria: Del mio sol vezzosi rai) but she has totally lost her heart to Polinesso (Aria:Il primo ardor).

A delightful valley

Ariodante and Ginevra enjoy the beauties of nature and each other's company (Duet: Se rinasce nel mio cor). They are joined by shepherds and shepherdesses (Duet with chorus: Si godete al vostro amor) who dance to entertain them (Ballet).

=== Act 2 ===
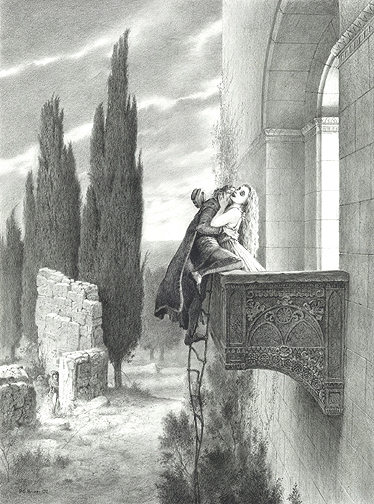
Dalinda disguised as Ginevra admits Polinesso to her bedroom, engraving by Gustave Doré

By ancient ruins, within sight of Ginevra's apartments; moonlight

Polinesso and Ariodante meet; Polinesso feigns astonishment when Ariodante tells him he is betrothed to Ginevra, insisting that Ginevra loves him. Ariodante refuses to believe it and threatens to kill Polinesso if he is found to be lying (Aria: Tu preparati a morire). This is all being observed by Lurcanio, who is hidden. Polinesso tells Ariodante to watch as "Ginevra", really Dalinda wearing Ginevra's clothes, admits Polinesso into her bedroom for the night. Ariodante is in despair and wants to die but Lurcanio comes from the shadows and advises Ariodante to live, and seek revenge (Aria: Tu vivi). Ariodante sadly bewails his beloved's (supposed) infidelity (Aria: Scherza infida). As day breaks, Polinesso and Dalinda emerge from the palace. Polinesso promises he will reward her, to her delight (Aria: Se tanto piace al cor) and, alone, Polinesso exults in how well his plot is proceeding (Aria: Se l'inganno).

A gallery in the palace

As the King is making the final arrangements for his daughter's wedding, the courtier Odoardo brings him bad news — Ariodante has been seen committing suicide by leaping into the sea. The King is heartbroken (Aria: Invida sorte avara). Ginevra appears, having a premonition of some approaching calamity (Aria: Mi palpita il core). When her father gives her the terrible news, she swoons and is carried away. Lurcanio now appears before the King, who attempts to comfort him on the loss of his brother. The furious Lurcanio, however, hands the King a letter telling him he saw Ginevra admit Polinesso into her bedroom for the night, which caused his brother to kill himself, and Lurcanio now is bent on revenge (Aria: Il tuo sangue). The King disowns his daughter and condemns her as a harlot. When Ginevra hears this, she collapses into delirium (Aria: Il mio crudel martoro) and all Dalinda's attempts to console her fail. Ginevra falls into a fitful, disturbed sleep (Ballet of Good and Bad Dreams). She awakes in distress (Recitativo accompagnato: Che vidi? oh Dei! misera me!)

=== Act 3 ===
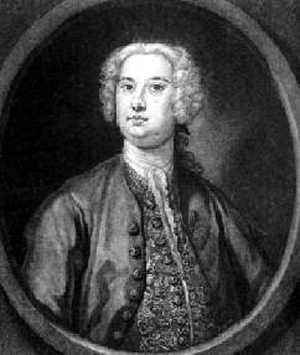
Giovanni Carestini, who created the role of Ariodante

A wood near the sea

Ariodante survived, and he now bitterly rebukes the gods for condemning him to live (Arioso: Numi! lasciarmi vivere). Hearing cries, Ariodante finds Dalinda, who is being held by thugs hired by Polinesso, with orders to kill her, as she is the only witness to his plot to discredit Ginevra. Ariodante drives Polinesso's henchmen away, and Dalinda reveals the truth to him — it was she, disguised as Ginevra, who let Polinesso into her bedroom. Ariodante rails against the treachery that caused him to doubt his beloved (Aria: Cieca notte). Alone, Dalinda expresses her anger at Polinesso for his treachery (Aria: Neghittosi or voi che fate?).

The royal gardens

The King announces that he will never see his daughter again unless a champion appears to defend her honor. Polinesso steps forward and offers to challenge Lurcanio to a duel (Aria: Dover, giustizia, amor). Ginevra, condemned to death for sexual irregularity, appears before her father begging to be allowed to kiss his hand (Aria: Io ti bacio). Her father clasps her to her bosom, saying that a champion has appeared to defend her — Polinesso. She does not like this idea, but he insists (Aria: Al sen ti stringo e parto). Ginevra prefers death to the loss of her honor (Aria: Sì, morrò).

The duelling ground, the King on his throne

Polinesso and Lurcanio fight, Lurcanio mortally wounds Polinesso who is carried away by Odoardo. A new champion appears with his visor down. He reveals himself as Ariodante, to the astonishment of all, and declares Ginevra innocent. Dalinda admits her part in the plot. Odoardo returns with the news that Polinesso, as he died, also admitted his guilt. The King pardons Dalinda and goes to find his daughter. Ariodante jubilantly hails a new bright day dawning after nights of darkness (Aria: Dopo notte). Lurcanio again offers his love to Dalinda, and she indicates that she is now inclined to accept it (Duet: Dite spera, e son contento).

The room where Ginevra is imprisoned

Ginevra looks death in the face (Arioso: Manca, oh Dei!). But her father and the others appear and declare her vindicated. She is reunited with her beloved Ariodante (Duet: Bramo aver mille vite).

The great hall of the palace. A large staircase supported by columns; on the upper part of the stairs musicians playing wind instruments. The King, Lords and Ladies descend the staircase. He begins the chorus, as the Lords and Ladies dance.

Ogn'uno acclami bella virtute (Chorus)…Ballo (Gavotte—Rondeau—Bourrée)…Sa trionfar ognor virtute in ogni cor (Chorus).

== Musical features ==
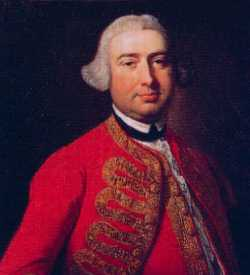
John Beard, who created the role of Lurcanio

The music for the leading soprano, Ginevra, is "outstanding", according to Paul Henry Lang, moving from joy to despair and back again to happiness. Also of note is her "exquisite" duet with Ariodante, "Prendi, prendi da questa mano" and the emotive pastoral music which concludes the first act. Among a series of arias for the title role, sung in the first performance by the castrato Carestini, is the mournful aria with bassoon obbligato "Scherza infida", "one of Handel's greatest arias" and the joyful "Dopo notte," which features virtuosic vocal acrobatics and a huge range. For Charles Burney, the opera "abounds with beauties and the strokes of a great master."

== Reception and performance history ==
Ariodante was given eleven performances in its original run, a mark of success for the time, and was revived by Handel for his 1736 season. It then went unperformed until a revival in Stuttgart at the Württembergisches Staatstheater in 1926.Two performances in Birmingham, England, in May 1964, with Janet Baker in the title role and Anthony Lewis conducting, brought the opera into the modern repertory, since when it has been performed on many of the world's stages.

Among other performances, a four-way co-production between the Festival d'Aix-en-Provence, the Canadian Opera Company, Dutch National Opera in Amsterdam, and Lyric Opera of Chicago premiered at Aix in 2014. This updated the setting to the 1960s and altered the ending so that Ginevra departs the celebration, heartbroken.

The English Concert gave semi-staged performances in 2017 in the U.S. and Europe, including at Carnegie Hall, where the event was filmed, and at the Barbican Centre. The Salzburg Whitsun Festival presented a new production by Christof Loy on 2 June 2017 featuring Cecilia Bartoli as Ariodante, Kathryn Lewek as Ginevra, Sandrine Piau as Dalinda, Christophe Dumaux as Polinesso, Rolando Villazón as Lurcanio and Nathan Berg as the King.

== Audio recordings ==
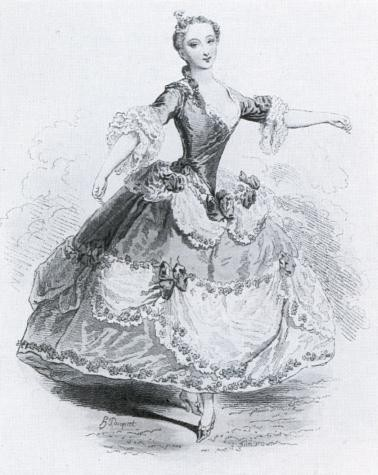
Marie Sallé, who danced in the original production of Ariodante

Ariodante discography, audio recordings
| Year | Cast: Ariodante, Ginevra, Dalinda, Polinesso, Lurcanio, King | Conductor, orchestra | Label |
|---|---|---|---|
| 1978, studio recording made in Brent Town Hall | Janet Baker, Edith Mathis, Norma Burrowes, James Bowman, David Rendall, Samuel Ramey | Raymond Leppard, English Chamber Orchestra | Philips, Cat:6769 025 |
| 1995, live in Göttingen | Lorraine Hunt, Juliana Gondek, Lisa Saffer, Jennifer Lane, Rufus Müller, Nicolas Cavallier | Nicholas McGegan, Freiburg Baroque Orchestra | Harmonia Mundi, Cat:HMU 907146.48 |
| 1997, live in Poissy | Anne Sofie von Otter, Lynne Dawson, Veronica Cangemi, Ewa Podleś, Richard Croft, Denis Sedov | Marc Minkowski, Les Musiciens du Louvre | Archiv, Cat:457 271–2 |
| 2000, live in Munich | Ann Murray, Joan Rodgers, Julie Kaufmann, Christopher Robson, Paul Nilon, Umberto Chiummo | Ivor Bolton, Bavarian State Orchestra | Farao Classics, Cat:B 108 030 |
| 2010, studio recording made at Villa San Ferma, Lonigo | Joyce DiDonato, Karina Gauvin, Sabina Puértolas, Marie-Nicole Lemieux, Topi Lehtipuu, Matthew Brook | Alan Curtis, Il Complesso Barocco | Virgin Classics, Cat:50999 07084423 |

== Video recordings ==
Ariodante discography, video recordings
| Year | Cast: Ariodante, Ginevra, Dalinda, Polinesso, Lurcanio, the King | Conductor, orchestra | Stage director | Label |
|---|---|---|---|---|
| 1996, filmed at English National Opera | Ann Murray, Joan Rodgers, Lesley Garrett, Christopher Robson, Paul Nilon, Gwynne Howell | Ivor Bolton, English National Opera | David Alden | Arthaus Musik; DVD cat. 100065 |
| 2007, filmed in the Teatro Caio Melisso, Spoleto | Ann Hallenberg, Laura Cherici, Marta Vandoni Iorio, Mary-Ellen Nesi, Zachary Stanis, Carlo Lepore | Alan Curtis, Il Complesso Barocco | John Pascoe | Dynamic; DVD cat. 33559 |
| 2017, filmed at the Salzburg Festival | Cecilia Bartoli, Kathryn Lewek, Sandrine Piau, Christophe Dumaux, Rolando Villazón, Nathan Berg | Gianluca Capuano, Les Musiciens du Prince-Monaco | Christof Loy | Unitel Edition; DVD/Blu-ray cat. A04050084 |
