= La fida ninfa =

Opera by Antonio Vivaldi

- Opera by Antonio Vivaldi
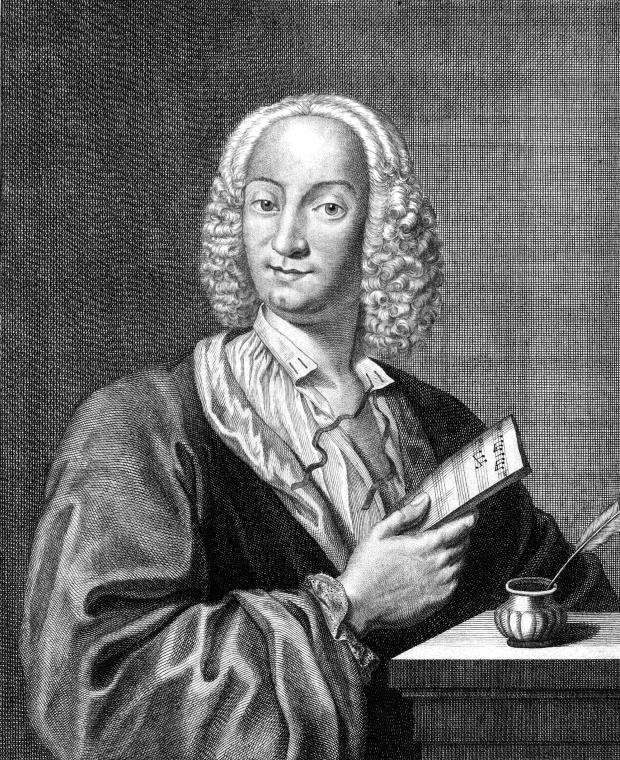
- Putative portrait of Vivaldi, 1725
- Librettist: Scipione Maffei
- Language: Italian
- Premiere: 6 January 1732; Teatro Filarmonico, Verona

La fida ninfa (The Faithful Nymph, RV 714) is an opera by Antonio Vivaldi to a libretto by Scipione Maffei. The opera was first performed for the opening of the Teatro Filarmonico in Verona on 6 January 1732. Among the arias is "Alma oppressa de sorte crudele" (Soul oppressed by cruel fate).

== Recording ==
- La fida ninfa – Sandrine Piau, Verónica Cangemi, Marie-Nicole Lemieux, Lorenzo Regazzo, Philippe Jaroussky, Sara Mingardo, Ensemble Matheus, Jean-Christophe Spinosi; Naïve Records, 3CDs; recorded Cathédrale Notre-Dame-du-Liban de Paris April/May 2008

== See also ==
- List of operas by Antonio Vivaldi
