= Rémi Geniet =

French pianist (born 1992)

Rémi Geniet (born 1992) is a French pianist.

== Early life and education ==
Rémi Geniet was born in Montpellier in 1992. He took his first piano lessons at the age of five. After studies in the Conservatoire de Montpellier, he entered in 2007 the class of Rena Shereshevskaya at the École Normale de Musique de Paris. From 2009 he studied with Brigitte Engerer, being one of her last students at the Conservatoire national supérieur de musique et de danse de Paris. He studied as well Renaissance Polyphony with Olivier Trachier, and orchestral conducting with George Pehlivanian. At the Hamburg Hochschüle für Musik he was taught by Evgeni Koroliov.

== Career ==
After being awarded a second prize at the Queen Elisabeth Competition in 2013, Geniet began an international career, being invited in concert halls such as the Great Hall of the Moscow Conservatory, Saint Petersburg Philharmonia, Suntory Hall, the Salle Gaveau, the Auditorium du Louvre, the Philharmonie Luxembourg, the Konzerthaus Berlin, the National Theater and Concert Hall, Taipei, the Kumho Art Hall in Seoul.

In 2014 he opened the "New Generation Piano" serie at the Louis Vuitton Foundation shortly after its inauguration. In 2016, following his prize at Young Concert Artists, he made his debut in Carnegie Hall (Zankel Hall). In 2020, he took part in a performance of Beethoven complete Sonatas at Radio France for the composer's 250th birthday. On this occasion he played the Sonata no. 28 opus 101 and the Diabelli Variations.

Geniet performed with orchestras including Saint Petersburg Philharmonic, Ural Philharmonic, Orchestre de la Suisse Romande, Luxembourg Philharmonic, Belgium National Orchestra, Orchestre Philharmonique de Liège, Barcelona Symphony, KBS Symphony Orchestra, Suzhou Symphony Orchestra, Hong Kong Sinfonietta, Yomiuri Nippon Symphony, under conductors such as Marin Alsop, Emmanuel Krivine, Edo de Waart, Thomas Sanderling, Okko Kamu, Eduard Topchjan, Alan Buribayev, Enrique Mazzola.

In chamber music, Geniet plays with musicians such as Augustin Dumay, Daniel Lozakovich, Alexandra Soumm, Aurélien Pascal, Raphaël Sévère.

== Recordings ==
- Bach (Mirare, 2015), Diapason d'Or of the year
- Beethoven (Mirare, 2017)

== Prizes ==
- Third prize at the International Competition for Young Pianists in Memory of Vladimir Horowitz in 2010
- Third prize at the International Telekom Beethoven Competition Bonn in 2011
- Second prize at the Queen Elisabeth Competition in 2013
- Diapason d'Or of the year 2015
