= Sabina Puértolas =

Spanish operatic soprano

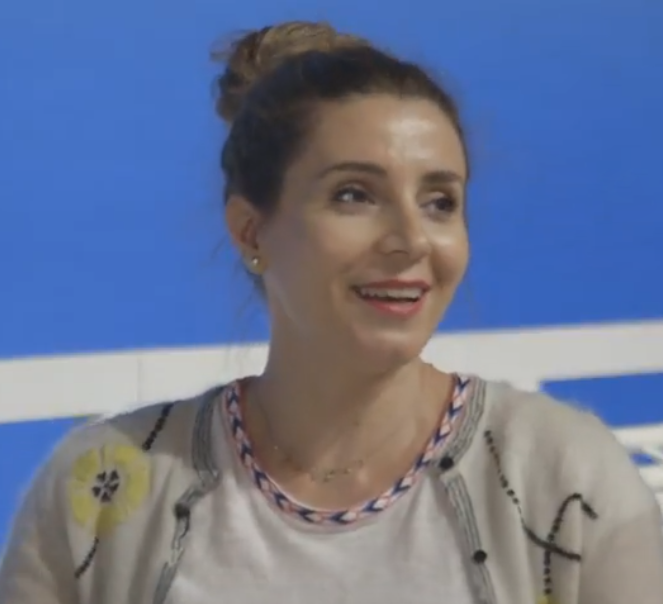
- In a 2017 interview
- Born: 1973 (age 51–52); Zaragoza, Spain
- Education: Pamplona Conservatoire; Accademia Chigiana; Accademia Verdiana
- Occupation: Opera singer (soprano)
- Years active: 2001–present
- Website: sabinapuertolas.com

Sabina Puértolas (born 1973) is a Spanish operatic soprano, who has performed leading roles internationally, including Gilda in Verdi's Rigoletto at the Royal Opera House and Rosina in Rossini's The Barber of Seville at the Seattle Opera.

== Early life and education ==
Sabina Puértolas was born in Zaragoza, Spain. She trained in Spain at the Pamplona Conservatoire, and then in Italy at the Accademia Musicale Chigiana in Siena and the Teatro Regio's Accademia Verdiana in Busseto where Carlo Bergonzi was her teacher.

== Career ==
Puértolas made her professional debut in 2001 as Oscar in Verdi's Un ballo in maschera at La Scala in Milan. She appeared at the Royal Opera House first in 2013 as Lisette in Puccini's La rondine, then also as Despina in Mozart's Così fan tutte. She performed at the Liceu in Barcelona both the Contessa di Folleville in Rossini's Il viaggio a Reims and Marie in Donizetti's La fille du régiment. She appeared as Fiorilla in Rossini's Il turco in Italia at the Théâtre du Capitole in Toulouse, in the title role of Handel's Rodelinda at the Teatro Real in Madrid, and as Gilda in Verdi's Rigoletto at the Teatro Municipal in Santiago, Chile.

In the United States, she performed Rosina in Rosssini's The Barber of Seville at the Seattle Opera in October 2017.

She was the winner of international competitions in Rovereto, Pamplona, Palma de Mallorca, Manuel Ausensi in Barcelona, and the Zarzuela Prize at the 2003 Operalia.

On 4 January 2018, her performance as Gilda at the Royal Opera House in London was critically acclaimed, after she was called only the day before to temporarily replace Lucy Crowe, who had a throat infection, and having only three hours to rehearse. However, she had performed as Gilda previously in the municipal theatre in Santiago, Chile. Puértolas flew from Spain the next day to perform. It was considered a "do or die" opportunity. Replacing a high-profile soprano performing in a prestigious venue and being the main female character of the opera was met with thunderous applause as reported by the news media. The saga of finding a replacement, with some candidates having singing obligations and others not having a visa to work in Britain, was covered internationally, including by the US, UK, and Spanish press.

== Recordings ==
Her published recordings include:

- Handel's Ariodante under Alan Curtis (Virgin Classics label)
- Handel's Alcina from La Monnaie (Alpha Classics label)
- José María Usandizaga's La llama (Deutsche Grammophon label)
