= Tatjana Vassiljeva =

Russian cellist (born 1977)

Tatjana Vassiljeva (born 1977) is a Russian cellist with many prizes.

== Biography ==
Vassiljeva was born in Novosibirsk, Russia and played cello since she was six years old. From 1989 to 1995 she attended Central Music School under a direction of Maria Zhuravleva, prior to which she used to go to the Special Music School which are both in Moscow.

=== Early career ===
She had performances throughout Europe and her native Russia. She first appeared in a 1992 Tchaikovsky Youth Competition in Moscow, and two years later participated at the ARD Munich Competition in Munich, Germany for which she won a prize. In 1999 she appeared at the International Adam Cello Competition in New Zealand and next year participated in the Pablo Casals Competition in Kronberg. In 2001 she received Grand Prix and Audience awards from the International Izuminomori Competition which was held in Osaka, Japan and the same year became the first Russian to be awarded Grand Prix de la Ville de Paris. In 2005 she received Victoires de la musique classique award and prior to it, in 2004, was named a Revelation from Abroad.

Throughout the years she appeared with such orchestras as the National Philharmonic Orchestra of Russia, Mariinsky Theatre Orchestra of Belarus, London and Vienna Radio Symphony Orchestras, and various Philharmonics, including the Saint Petersburg, Lithuanian and both Tokyo and New Japan Philharmonic Orchestras. She also played under directions from such notable Russian conductors as Valery Gergiev, Vassily Sinaisky, Vladimir Spivakov, Yuri Bashmet, Yuri Temirkanov, Mstislav Rostropovitch, Dmitri Kitayenko, and American conductor David Zinman, among others.

=== 2005 - 2008 ===
In 2005 along with Paul Badura-Skoda she did various cello and piano works, and next year played Ludwig van Beethoven's Triple Concerto in Venezuela with Italian music director Claudio Abbado. During the same year she had tours and concerts throughout the Netherlands, Germany, and Spain and played Dmitri Shostakovich at the Salle Pleyel of Paris and some Rostropovich's compositions with the Orchestre de Paris and Philharmonie Luxembourg. In 2007 she appeared in the Berlin Philharmonic and in 2008 she gave concerto grosso with Krzysztof Penderecki with whom she had many concerts in the past. Later on, she collaborated with him again in 2009, this time in Spain.

=== 2008 - 2009 ===
During the same year, under a direction of Yuri Temirkanov she gave concerts in Tokyo and Saint Petersburg with the Saint Petersburg Philharmonic Orchestra. During the Edinburgh Festival she performed Sergei Prokofiev's sinfonia concertante along with LSO and under a direction of Maestro Gergiev. Later on, she was invited by him to perform a memoriam concert of Mstislav Rostropovich with the Mariinsky Theatre Symphony Orchestra. She finished the year with Henri Dutilleux's concert which she did along with the Japanese Philharmonic Orchestra of Osaka and in Vienna with its Radio Symphony Orchestra which at the time was conducted by Bertrand de Billy.

=== 2009 - 2011 ===
In 2009 Vassiljeva appeared at the Prague Spring Festival with Jiri Kout and the same year participated along with Saburo Teshigawara at Cadogan Hall in London and with Yoel Levi in La Grange de Meslay. From 2010 to 2011 she participated with the Orchestre National de France in Théâtre des Champs-Élysées, conductor of whom was Daniele Gatti. Later on, she played along with Hugh Wolf and Philharmonic Orchestra of New Japan in Tokyo and then played cello for both Munich and Gasteig Philharmonics under command of Tugan Sokhiev. She also took part in the Victoria Hall in Geneva and played for both the Moscow Conservatory Grand Hall and the Grand Hall of the Musikverein in Vienna, Austria. During the same years she also had a tour with Tchaikovsky Symphony Orchestra and Vladimir Fedoseev which was performed in Tonhalle, Zürich.

=== Present ===
Tatjana also participated in various chamber music festivals including the Lockenhaus and Verbier Festivals, among others. She recorded numerous albums with Naxos Records which featured her works of Igor Stravinsky, Benjamin Britten, Henri Dutilleux, and Claude Debussy, along with Mirare's sonatas of Frédéric Chopin and Charles-Valentin Alkan for which she got a recommendation from Classica. Recently she released Krzysztof Penderecki's Concerto No. 2 under a Naxos label, which was performed by her along with Polish conductor Antoni Wit and his Warsaw National Philharmonic Orchestra.

== Discography ==
- 2000 — Cello Recital — Naxos Records
- 2002 — Dramatic Games — Accord and Universal Records
- 2004 — Schubert-Franck-Stravinsky — Accord and Universal
- 2005 — Violoncelle Solo — Accord and Universal
- 2009 — Bach Six Suites pour Violoncelle — Mirare
- 2010 — Chopin and Alkan — Mirare
- 2011 — Penderecki Cello Concerto N2 — Naxos
- 2012 — Tatjana Vassiljeva in Berlin Philharmonic String Quintet — Pentatone Classics
- 2013 — Haydn Concertos — Mirare
