= Topi Lehtipuu =

Finnish operatic tenor (born 1971)

Topi Lehtipuu (born 24 March 1971) is a Finnish operatic tenor. He has sung a variety of roles from different periods, including the title role in Benjamin Britten's Albert Herring at the Finnish National Opera, several roles in Mozart operas, including Belmonte in Die Entführung aus dem Serail and Tamino in Die Zauberflöte, both at the Théâtre des Champs-Elysées in Paris, and Ferrando in Così fan tutte at the 2006 Glyndebourne Festival. He has also appeared in Handel's Ariodante (Paris Opera), as Hylas in Berlioz' Les Troyens (conducted by John Eliot Gardiner), and the Creature in the 2019 world première of Mark Grey's Frankenstein at La Monnaie in Brussels. He has worked with other well-known conductors, such as William Christie, Michel Corboz, René Jacobs, Simon Rattle, and Christophe Rousset.

He has also sung concert repertoire including works by J. S. Bach, Monteverdi, Pärt, Rameau, Rautavaara, Schoenberg, and Stravinsky.

Lehtipuu was the artistic director from 2010 to 2015 of the Turku Music Festival, and Joroinen Music Days (now the Joroinen Music Festival). From 2015 to 2018 he was director of the Helsinki Festival. He has improved his conducting abilities and was appointed Artistic Partner of the Kymi Sinfonietta, beginning in the 2023-2024 season.

Lehtipuu received his musical education at the Sibelius Academy in Helsinki and has studied with Peter Lindroos, Howard Crook, and Elisabeth Werres.

At the time of his studies, Lehtipuu was an integral member of the acclaimed Finnish progressive rock band Höyry-kone.

== Personal life ==
Lehtipuu was born in Brisbane, Australia, but he grew up in Tampere, Finland. He lived in Paris, France, for 15 years in the 2000s and early 2010s.

== Recordings ==
- Arie Per Tenore I Barocchisti dir. Diego Fasolis, Naive, 2010.
- Ariodante by George Frideric Handel. Joyce DiDonato, Karina Gauvin, Sabina Puértolas, Marie Nicole Lemieux, Topi Lehtipuu, Matthew Brook, Anicio Zorzi Giustiniani. Il Complesso Barocco, conducted by Alan Curtis, Virgin Classics, 2011.
