= Raphaël Sévère =

French musician

Raphaël Sévère (born 15 September 1994 in Rennes) is a French clarinettist and composer.

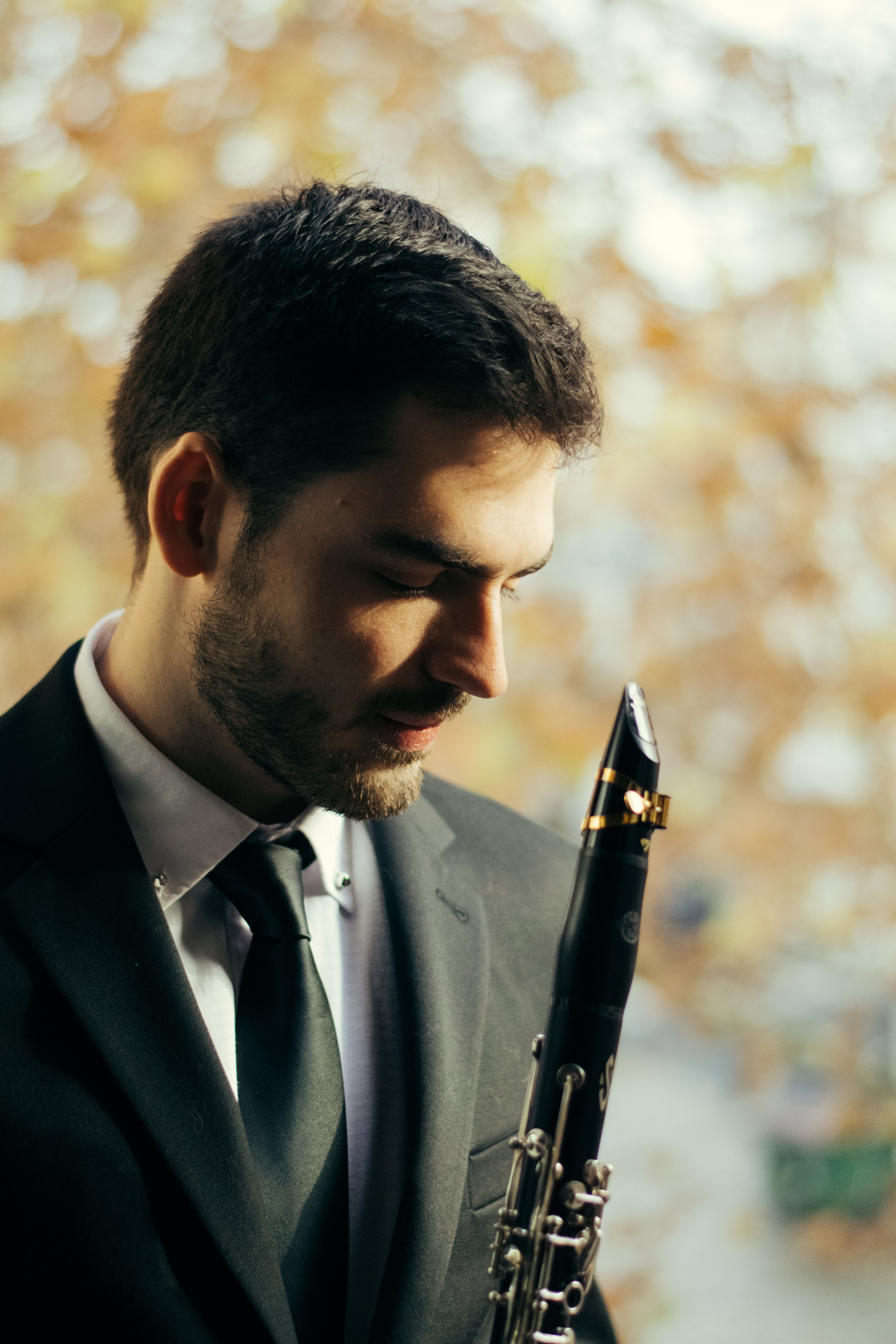
Raphaël Sévère

== Biography ==
At the age of 12, Raphaël Sévère won 1st prize and the special prize at the Japan Clarinet Society competition in the 18-20 age category (Tokyo 2007). After gaining a nomination as ‘Solo Instrumental Discovery’ at the Victoires de la Musique Classique when aged fifteen, he went on to win the prestigious Young Concerts Artists International Auditions in New York in November 2013, where he was awarded First Prize and eight special prizes.

Aged 8, he took up the clarinet at the Conservatoire de Nantes. At 14, he was admitted to the Conservatoire National Supérieur de Musique of Paris where he obtained in June 2013 the master of arts degree with high honors.

Raphaël Sévère has been invited to play as a soloist with London Philharmonic Orchestra, Deutsches Symphonie-Orchester Berlin, Konzerthausorchester Berlin, Sinfonia Varsovia, National Philharmonic of Russia, Württembergisches Kammerorchester Heilbronn, Orchestra of St. Luke's, Edmonton Symphony Orchestra, Hong Kong Sinfonietta, Korean National Symphony Orchestra. He played in France with many orchestras including Orchestre de chambre de Paris, Orchestre national d'Île-de-France, Orchestre National Bordeaux Aquitaine, Orchestre National du Capitole de Toulouse, Orchestre National de Lille, Orchestre Philharmonique de Strasbourg, Orchestre National des Pays de la Loire.

He performed at Berlin Philharmonie, Théâtre des Champs Elysées, Auditorium du Louvre, KKL Lucerne, Prague Rudolfinum, New York Lincoln Center, Washington D.C Kennedy Center, New York Alice Tully Hall, Boston Gardner Museum, Seoul Arts Center, Hong Kong City Hall.

In the field of chamber music, he performed with Pražák Quartet, Modigliani Quartet, Ébène Quartet, Trio Wanderer, Trio Karenine, Martha Argerich, Boris Berezovsky, Jean-Frédéric Neuburger, Adam Laloum, Gidon Kremer, Renaud Capuçon, David Grimal, Alexander Sitkovetsky, Gérard Caussé, Antoine Tamestit, Gary Hoffman, Xavier Phillips.

Raphaël Sévère regularly gives masterclasses in Europe and Asia. In 2024, he was appointed clarinet professor at the Ecole Normale de Musique de Paris.

Always attracted by creation and himself a composer, his works are published by L'empreinte mélodique.

== Compositions ==
- Obscurs for clarinet and guitar (premiered in Festival Européen Jeunes Talents in Paris in July 2015).
- Entre les liens for clarinet and piano (commissioned by the Festival Musicades et Olivades and premiered in Saint-Rémy de Provence in July 2018).
- Sept Miniatures for piano (premiered in Paris salle Cortot by Paul Montag in February 2019).
- Entre chien et Loup for guitar (commissioned by Antoine Morinière and premiered in Vienna in July 2019).
- Mojenn, legend for clarinet and orchestra (commissioned by the Orchestre National de Bretagne and premiered in Rennes in March 2020).
- Le pont d'Arcole for violin, cello, piano (commissioned by the Festival Européen Jeunes talents and premiered in Paris by the Trio Karénine in July 2020).
- Orages d'acier for violin, clarinet, piano (commissioned by Théâtre La Scala and premiered in Paris in October 2020).
- Partita for strings trio (commissioned by the Festival Européen Jeunes talents and premiered in Paris in May 2021 by the Trio Sypniewski).
- La 7e preuve for soprano saxophone and piano (commissioned by Valentine Michaud and premiered in Festival Radio France Occitanie Montpellier in July 2022 by the Akmi Duo).
- Non mudera for euphonium and piano, commissioned by Corentin Morvan.
- Comme si for flute, clarinet, violin and cello (premiered salle Cortot with Mathilde Caldérini, Caroline Sypniewski, David Petrlik and Raphaël Sévère in March 2023).
- Phoenix, for viola, clarinet and orchestra (commissioned by Hong Kong Sinfonietta and premiered with Adrien La Marca, Raphaël Sévère and Hong Kong Sinfonietta at Hong Kong City Hall in April 2023).

== Discography ==
- Récital de musique française, Hort 536, live concert held on 23 June 2007 in Cholet. Works by Poulenc, Saint-Saëns, Claude Debussy, Ernest Chausson, Gabriel Pierné with Tünde Hajdu, pianist. Awards : Diapason (4 stars), Classic Info Disque (Revelation), Classica Repertoire (Discovery).
- Opus 2, Thys 004, July 2010. Works by Bohuslav Martinu, Emil Cossetto, Sergei Taneïev, Witold Lutoslawski, Zoltán Kodály, Malcolm Arnold, Arthur Honegger, Ferruccio Busoni, Jean Françaix with Tünde Hajdu, pianist. Awards : Diapason (5 stars).
- Folksongs, Naïve V5365, May 2014. Vocal works by Berio, Brahms, Falla, Granados, Obradors with Nora Gubisch, mezzo-soprano and Alain Altinoglu, pianist and conductor. Awards : Télérama (Event ffff).
- Brahms, Mirare 250, September 2014. Trio op.114 and sonatas op.120 with Victor Julien-Laferrière, cello and Adam Laloum, piano. Awards : Diapason (Diapason d'Or), Télérama (Event ffff).
- Brahms, Hindemith, Mirare 282, November 2015 : Quintets by Brahms and Hindemith with Prazák Quartet. Awards : Diapason (5 stars), Télérama (Event ffff), France Musique (The selection).
- Weber, Mirare 372, September 2017 : Concerto opus 73, Variations opus 33, Grand Duo opus 48 with Deutsches Symphonie-Orchester Berlin (dir. Aziz Shokhakimov) and Jean-Frédéric Neuburger, piano. Awards : Diapason (5 stars).
- Messiaen, Ades, Mirare 334, November 2018 : Quatuor pour la fin du temps by Messiaen and Court studies by Ades with Trio Messiaen. Awards : Diapason (Diapason d'Or), Classica (Choc), France Musique (The selection), Le Monde, ResMusica.
- On tour, Mirare 498, October 2019 : works for clarinet and piano by Lutoslawski, Poulenc, Weiner, Bartok, Sévère, Bernstein with Paul Montag, pianist. Awards : Diapason (5 stars), France Info (Sélection culture).
- Mozart/Clarinet works, Mirare 626, September 2022 : Concerto K.622 and Quintet K.581 by W.A. Mozart with Orchestre de chambre de Paris (dir. Lars Vogt) and with Modigliani Quartet. Awards : Radio Classique (Trophée), France Musique (Le choix), Diapason (5 diapasons), Resmusica (La clé).
- Sing, Songs without words, Harmonia Mundi HMM902746, November 2025 : Lieder by Schumann, Brahms, Wagner transcribed for clarinet and piano with Adam Laloum, pianist. Awards : France Musique (Le choix), Radio Classique (Trophée).
