= London Festival of Baroque Music =

The London Festival of Baroque Music (formerly the Lufthansa Festival of Baroque Music) is an annual music festival held in London.

== History ==
The London Festival of Baroque Music was founded as the Lufthansa Festival of Baroque Music in 1984 by the conductor Ivor Bolton and musicologist Tess Knighton, who served as its Artistic Director until 1997. Kate Bolton was Artistic Director from 1997 to 2007 and was succeeded by Lindsay Kemp, who remained in the post until 2017.

The Festival's first concerts took place at St James's Church, Piccadilly. Concerts are now held primarily at St John's, Smith Square, a classical music venue originally built as a church in the Baroque period. Concerts also take place at Westminster Abbey. Other venues in the Westminster area have included St Margaret's Church, St Peter's Eaton Square, and Westminster School.

== Artists and Repertoire ==
The London Festival of Baroque Music presents concerts of music from the Baroque period, performed on period instruments. It specialises in inviting non-UK performers, often making their UK debut, as well as UK musicians.

Ensembles who have appeared include Musica Antiqua Köln, Collegium Vocale Gent, the Freiburg Baroque Orchestra, the Akademie für Alte Musik Berlin, the Bach Ensemble, Tafelmusik, Europa Galante, The English Concert and the Gabrieli Consort & Players, while soloists have included Emma Kirkby, Andreas Scholl, Magdalena Kožená, Anna Caterina Antonacci, Andrew Manze, Trevor Pinnock and Paolo Pandolfo.

The Festival is usually based around a theme. For 2018, the theme is French Baroque music, under the title 'Treasures of the Grand Siècle', led by Executive Director, Richard Heason, and Guest Artistic Director, Sebastien Dauce.
