= Lorenzo Regazzo =

Italian opera singer

Lorenzo Regazzo (born in Venice) is an opera singer. His voice can be categorised as bass, bass-baritone or basso cantante. He is especially well known for interpreting Baroque, Classical, and bel canto repertoire. Among the qualities frequently noted by the critical press are his virtuosic coloratura technique, sumptuous tone, and vivid stage presence.

Performing at the major opera and concert venues of Europe, as well as in Japan and the US, Regazzo has also been a regular guest at musical events such as the Salzburg Festival and the Rossini Opera Festival in Pesaro.

Among the conductors he collaborated with are Simon Rattle, Riccardo Muti, Lorin Maazel, Colin Davis, Claudio Abbado, Riccardo Chailly, Daniele Gatti, Nikolaus Harnoncourt, Jesús López-Cobos and Marcello Viotti. He has made Baroque music recordings and took part in live performances with such specialists of the genre as René Jacobs, Emmanuelle Haïm, Rinaldo Alessandrini, Jean-Christophe Spinosi, Fabio Biondi, Claudio Scimone, and Andrea Marcon.

Regazzo holds degrees in singing, piano, choral music, and choral conducting, and has studied voice with Sesto Bruscantini and Regina Resnik. His operatic début (in Rossini's L'inganno felice) took place in 1994 at the Pesaro Festival.

== Discography ==
His discography includes Le Nozze di Figaro (with René Jacobs), which won the Grammy Award in the category of Best Opera Recording; two recitals: Chante Venise and Vivaldi: Arie per Basso (Naïve; with Rinaldo Alessandrini) for both of which Regazzo received the "Orphée d'or" awards.

=== CD ===
Studio

- Handel: Arie per basso, 2009 (solo recital) – Lorenzo Regazzo, Concerto Italiano, Rinaldo Alessandrini (conductor). Label: Opus111/Naive
- La fida ninfa, Vivaldi, 2008 (as Oralto) – Veronica Cangemi, Sandrine Piau, Marie Nicole Lemieux, Lorenzo Regazzo, Philippe Jaroussky, Topi Lehtipuu, Sara Mingardo, Christian Senn; Ensemble Matheus, Jean-Christophe Spinosi (conductor). Label: Opus111/Naïve
- Don Giovanni, Mozart, 2007 (as Leporello) – Johannes Weisser, Lorenzo Regazzo, Alexandrina Pendatchanska, Olga Pasichnyk, Tarver, Im, Guerzoni, Borchev; Freiburger Barockorchester, René Jacobs (conductor). Label: Harmonia Mundi
- Vivaldi: Arie per basso, 2006 (solo recital) – Lorenzo Regazzo, Concerto Italiano, Rinaldo Alessandrini (conductor). Label: Opus111/Naive
- Orlando furioso, Vivaldi, 2004 (as Astolfo) – Marie-Nicole Lemieux, Jennifer Larmore, Veronica Cangemi, Philippe Jaroussky, Lorenzo Regazzo; Ensemble Matheus, Jean-Christophe Spinosi (conductor). Label: Opus111/Naive
- Le nozze di Figaro, Mozart, 2004 (as Figaro) – Véronique Gens, Patrizia Ciofi, Angelika Kirchschlager, Lorenzo Regazzo, Simon Keenlyside; René Jacobs (conductor), Concerto Köln. Label: Harmonia Mundi
- L'Orfeo, Monteverdi, 2004 (as Plutone) – Natalie Dessay, Ian Bostridge, Patrizia Ciofi, Alice Coote, Sonia Prina, Mario Luperi, Veronique Gens, Lorenzo Regazzo; Le Concert d'Astree, Emmanuelle Haïm (conductor) Label: Virgin Veritas
- Chante Venise, Mayr, Rossini, Buzzolla, Hahn; 2003 (solo recital) – Lorenzo Regazzo; Dimitri Romano, pianoforte. Label: Forlane
- La contadina, Hasse, 2002, (as Don Tabarano – Lorenzo Regazzo, Graciela Oddone; Ensemble Arcadia, Attilio Cremonesi (conductor). Label: Megaphon Importservice
- La gondola, Buzzolla, 2000 (soloist) – Lorenzo Regazzo; Dimitri Romano, pianoforte. Label: Rivo Alto
- L'inganno felice, Rossini, 1997 (as Ormondo) – Annick Massis, Raul Gimenez, Rodney Gilfry, Pietro Spagnoli, Lorenzo Regazzo; Le Concert des Tuileries, Marc Minkowski (conductor). Label: Erato

Live

- L'Italiana in Algeri, Rossini, 2010, recorded in 2008 at Rossini in Wildbad Festival (as Mustafà) – Marianna Pizzolato, Lorenzo Regazzo, Lawrence Brownlee, Bruno De Simone, Giulio Mastrototaro, Alberto Zedda (conductor). Label: Naxos
- Elena e Costantino, Ramón Carnicer, 2009, recorded at Teatro Real, Madrid in 2005 – Ruth Rosique, Robert McPherson, Saimir Pirgu, Lorenzo Regazzo, Mariola Cantarero, et al.; Coro y Orquesta Titular del Teatro Real, Jesús López Cobos (conductor). Label: Dynamic (CDS 619)
- Due Messe "Catanesi", Bellini, 2008, recorded in Pompeii 1998 – Cinzia Forte, Paoletta Marrocu, Stefano Ferrari, Lorenzo Regazzo; Accademia i Filarmonici, Maurizio Ciampi (conductor). Label: Nuova Era
- L'inganno felice, Rossini, 2008, recorded at Wildbad Rossini Festival 2005 (as Tarabotto) – Kenneth Tarver, Corinna Mologni, Lorenzo Regazzo, Marco Vinco, Simon Bailey; Czech Chamber Soloists,. Alberto Zedda (conductor). Label: Naxos
- Mosè in Egitto, Rossini, 2007, recorded at Wildbad Rossini Festival 2006) (as Mosè) – Regazzo, Amou, Gierlach, Adami, Bevacqua, Trucco; Wurttemberg Philharmonic, Antonino Fogliani (conductor). Label: Naxos
- L'Orione, Cavalli, 2001, live recording (as Filotero) – Francesc Garrigosa, Laura Polverelli, Lorenzo Regazzo, Andrea Marcon (conductor); Mondo Musica
- Una cosa rara, Vicente Martin Y Soler, 1999, live recording) (as Lubino) – Cinzia Forte, Luigi Petroni, Luca Dordolo, Lorenzo Regazzo; La Fenice Theatre Orchestra, Giancarlo Andretta (conductor). Label: Mondo Musica
- L'inganno felice, Rossini (1999, CD, live recording (as Batone) – Carmela Remigio, Lorenzo Regazzo, Luigi Petroni, Paolo Rumetz, Roberto Scaltriti; La Fenice Theatre Orchestra, Giancarlo Andretta (conductor). Label: Mondo Musica
- La gazza ladra, Rossini, 1998, live recording (as il Podestà) – Andrea Cortese, Enrico Cossutta, Franco Vassallo, Giovanni Andreoli; La Fenice Theatre Orchestra, Giancarlo Andretta (conductor). Label: Mondo Musica

Compilations

- Vivaldi, il furioso!, 2006 – Sandrine Piau, Sara Mingardo, Marie-Nicole Lemieux, Philippe Jaroussky, Magdalena Kožená, Lorenzo Regazzo et al. Label: Opus111/Naive
- Le Style Classique: The First Viennese School, 2005 – Antonio Abete, Cornelius Hauptmann, Lorenzo Regazzo, Simon Keenlyside. Label: Harmonia Mundi
- The Finest Sacred & Secular Arias from 1600 to 1800, 2004 – Lorenzo Regazzo, Marcello Lippi, Maurice Bevan, Nicolas Rivenq, Simon Keenlyside. Label Harmonia Mundi

=== DVD ===
- Il turco in Italia, Rossini, 2011 (as Selim) – Lorenzo Regazzo, Giulio Mastrototaro, Silvia Dalla Benetta, Francesco Morace, Daniele Zanfardino; Giovanni Battista Rigon; Orchestra del Padova e del Veneto; recorded live at Teatro Olimpico, Settimane Muicali 2009. Label: Jupiter Classics
- Il barbiere di Siviglia, Rossini, 2009 (as Don Basilio) – Dionigi D'Ostuni, Elia Fabbian, Concetta D'Alessandro, Cuneyt Unsal, Lorenzo Regazzo; Giovanni Battista Rigon (conductor), Orchestra del Padova e del Veneto; recorded live at Teatro Olimpico, Settimane Musicali 2008
- Le nozze di Figaro, Mozart, 2006 (as Figaro) – Peter Mattei, Christiane Oelze, Lorenzo Regazzo, Christine Schäfer, Heidi Grant Murphy; Sylvain Cambreling (conductor). Label: Opus Arte
- Don Giovanni, Mozart, 2006 (as Leporello) – Carlos Alvarez, Lorenzo Regazzo, Maria Bayo, Sonia Ganassi, Jose Bros; Víctor Pablo Pérez (conductor). Label: Opus Arte
- Maometto II, Rossini, 2005 (as Maometto) – Lorenzo Regazzo, Carmen Giannatasio, Maxim Mironov, Annarita Gemmabella; La Fenice Theatre Orchestra, Claudio Scimone (conductor). Label: Dynamic
- Don Giovanni, Mozart, 1999 (as Masetto) – Alvarez, Pieczonka, Antonacci, Kirchschlager, d'Arcangelo, Schade, Regazzo, Selig; Vienna Philharmonic, Riccardo Muti (conductor). Label: TDK
