= Jean-Christophe Spinosi =

French conductor and violinist (born 1964)

- Born: 2 September 1964 (age 62); Corsica, France
- Origin: Brest, France
- Occupations: Conductor; violinist
- Years active: 1991–present
- Member of: Ensemble Matheus

Jean-Christophe Spinosi (born 2 September 1964) is a French conductor, violinist, and founder of the Ensemble Matheus.

== Life and career ==
In 1991, Spinosi founded the Ensemble Matheus, an internationally performing orchestra, in Brest, France.

In 2005, Spinosi and the Ensemble Matheus began a series of recordings dedicated to the composer Vivaldi, a project which resulted in several albums and four opera recordings. Spinosi has since conducted works from the Classical, Baroque, and Romantic eras, as well as numerous works from the 20th and 21st centuries.

Spinosi has collaborated with artists such as Cecilia Bartoli, Marie-Nicole Lemieux, and Philippe Jaroussky. With Jaroussky, he recorded the album Heroes for Virgin Classics.

Beginning in 2007, Spinosi conducted new opera productions each season with the Ensemble Matheus at the Théâtre du Châtelet. He has also performed at the Théâtre des Champs-Élysées, the Theater an der Wien, and the Vienna State Opera.

He has worked with several stage directors, including Pierrick Sorin (for Rossini's La pietra del paragone in 2007 and 2014), Oleg Kulik (for Monteverdi's Vespro della Beata Vergine in 2009), Claus Guth (for Handel's Messiah at the Theater an der Wien, 2009), and Moshe Leiser and Patrice Caurier (for Rossini's Otello at the Théâtre des Champs-Élysées and Salzburg Festival in 2014).

Spinosi has conducted numerous orchestras, including the Deutsches Symphonie-Orchester Berlin, the Orchestre de Paris, the Vienna State Opera, the Monte-Carlo Philharmonic Orchestra, the Frankfurt Radio Symphony, the Orchestre national du Capitole de Toulouse, the Scottish Chamber Orchestra, the New Japan Philharmonic, the Royal Stockholm Philharmonic Orchestra, the Berlin Radio Symphony Orchestra, the Vienna Symphony, the Vienna Radio Symphony Orchestra, the Castile and León Symphony Orchestra, the City of Birmingham Symphony Orchestra, the NDR Radiophilharmonie, the Mozarteum Orchestra Salzburg, the Orchestre du Festival de Verbier, the Handel and Haydn Society, the Moscow Chamber Orchestra, the Osaka Philharmonic Orchestra, the Konzerthausorchester Berlin, and the Hamburg State Opera. In 2021, Spinosi conducted the Berlin Philharmonic.

Spinosi and Cecilia Bartoli collaborated on two Rossini operas: Otello at the Théâtre des Champs-Élysées and the Salzburg Festival, and La Cenerentola at the Salzburg Festival.

His albums for Deutsche Grammophon—Lucifer with the Monte-Carlo Philharmonic Orchestra, and Miroirs with the Ensemble Matheus—won the "Choc" award from Classica magazine.

In 2017 and 2018, he worked with the Quebec ensemble, Les Violons du Roy, and contralto Marie-Nicole Lemieux for the opera Carmen. Other engagements included performances with Ensemble Matheus and the Castile and León Symphony Orchestra, Rossini's La Cenerentola at the Royal Swedish Opera, three productions at the Vienna State Opera (Carmen, The Barber of Seville, and La Cenerentola), and a concert at the Prince's Palace of Monaco leading the Monte-Carlo Philharmonic Orchestra.

== Discography ==
Year	Album	Label	Composer	Notes; personnel
1996	Vivaldi: Concerti Con Molti Strumenti	Pierre Verany		Ensemble Matheus
1997	Vivaldi: Concerti Con Molti Strumenti, Vol. II	Pierre Verany		Ensemble Matheus
2003	La notte, La tempesta di mare, Il gardellino	Opus111/Naïve	Vivaldi	Ensemble Matheus
2003	La verità in cimento	Opus111/Naïve	Vivaldi	Gemma Bertagnolli, Philippe Jaroussky, Sara Mingardo, Guillemette Laurens, Nathalie Stutzmann, and Ensemble Matheus
2004	De Lhoyer: Duos et Concerto Pour Guitare	Opus111/Naïve		Philippe Spinosi (guitar), Duo Spinosi, and Ensemble Matheus
2004	Orlando furioso	Opus111/Naïve	Vivaldi	Marie-Nicole Lemieux, Jennifer Larmore, Veronica Cangemi, Ann Hallenberg, Philippe Jaroussky, Lorenzo Regazzo, and Ensemble Matheus
2006	Griselda	Opus111/Naïve	Vivaldi	Simone Kermes, Marie-Nicole Lemieux, Veronica Cangemi, Philippe Jaroussky, Stefano Ferrari, Iestyn Davies, and Ensemble Matheus
2006	Vivaldi, Heroes	Opus111/Naïve		Philippe Jaroussky and Ensemble Matheus
2007	La pietra del paragone	Opus111/Naïve	Rossini	DVD; recorded live at Théâtre du Châtelet, Paris; François Lis, Christian Senn, José Manuel Zapata, Sonia Prina, Jennifer Holloway, Laura Giordano, Joan Martín-Royo, Filippo Polinelli, Chorus of Teatro Regio di Parma, and Ensemble Matheus.
2008	Nisi Dominus, Stabat Mater	Opus111/Naïve	Vivaldi	Marie Nicole Lemieux, Philippe Jaroussky, and Ensemble Matheus
2008	La fida ninfa	Opus111/Naïve	Vivaldi	Veronica Cangemi, Sandrine Piau, Marie Nicole Lemieux, Lorenzo Regazzo, Philippe Jaroussky, Topi Lehtipuu, Sara Mingardo, Christian Senn, and Ensemble Matheus
2013	Mirrors	Deutsche Grammophon	Shostakovich, Bacri, Bach	Malena Ernman and Ensemble Matheus
2013	Lucifer	Deutsche Grammophon	Connesson	Monte-Carlo Philharmonic Orchestra
2018	Antonio Vivaldi	Decca Classic	Vivaldi (arias)	Cecilia Bartoli and Ensemble Matheus
