= Mendi Mendiyan =

Opera by José María Usandizaga

Mendi Mendiyan is a 1910 Basque language opera by the Basque composer José María Usandizaga.

== Recordings ==
- Marco Polo 2CD
