= José María Usandizaga =

Spanish composer (1887–1915)

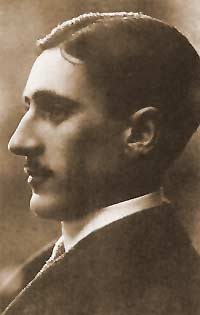
José María Usandizaga in 1915

José María Usandizaga (31 March 1887–5 October 1915) was a Spanish Basque composer.

A native of San Sebastián, Usandizaga began his musical studies in his hometown before moving to the Schola Cantorum in Paris. There, he was a composition pupil of Vincent d'Indy, and he took piano lessons from Gabriel Grovlez. From 1906 he was back in Spain, where he won success with his works for the stage and a number of other pieces. Usandizaga succumbed to tuberculosis in 1915.

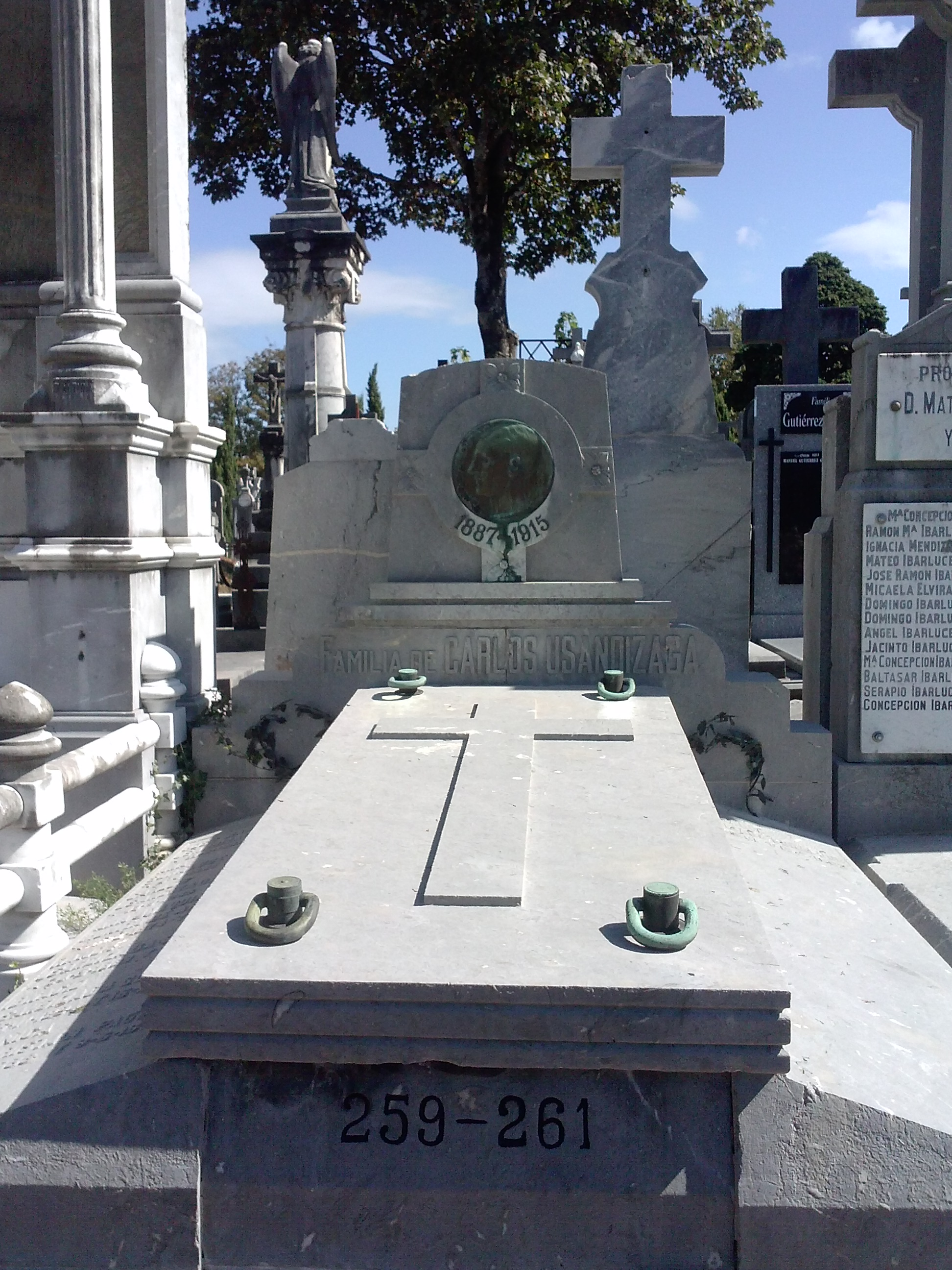
Grave of José María Usandizaga at Polloe Cemetery, San Sebastián or Donostia

Most of Usandizaga's music is based on Basque themes; among his works are several chamber pieces, some rhapsodies, and the operas Mendi Mendiyan ("High in the Mountains", a Basque language opera) and Las golondrinas (The Swallows), initially a zarzuela which was arranged as an opera after the composer's death by his brother Ramón and premiered in 1929 at the Liceu in Barcelona. A third opera, the lyric drama La llama ("The Flame"), was left incomplete after his death; this, too was completed by his brother Ramón and premiered in 1918 in San Sebastián.

== Bibliography ==
- Naxos.com biography
