= La llama (opera) =

Opera by José María Usandizaga

La llama is a 1915 Spanish language opera by the Basque composer José María Usandizaga. The Orquesta Sinfónica de Euskadi (OSE) revived the opera under the baton of Juan José Ocón in 2015, accompanied by a recording on Deutsche Grammophon.
