= Ensemble Resonanz =

German string ensemble

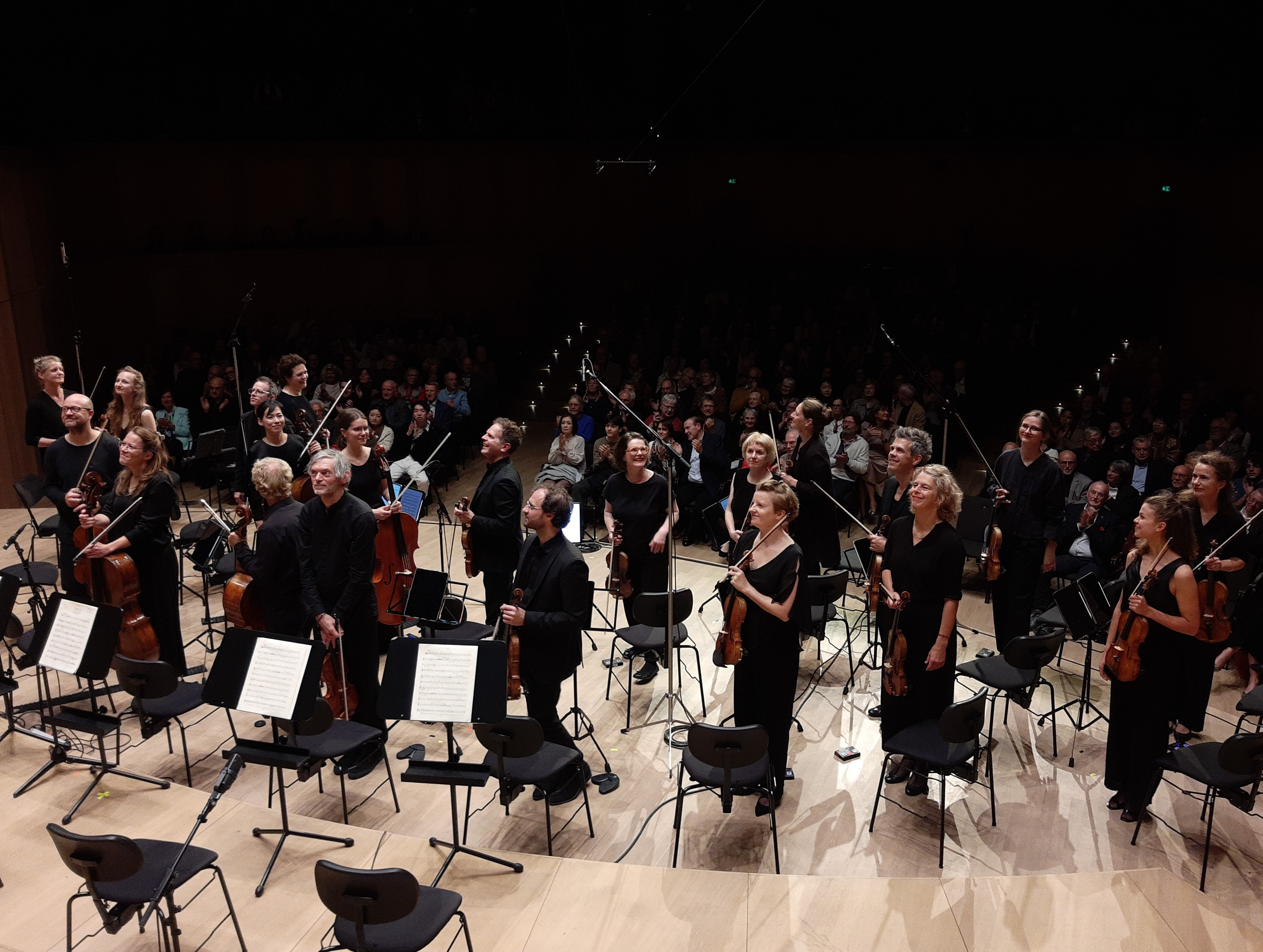
At Kronberg Festival with Tabea Zimmermann (centre) in 2025

The Ensemble Resonanz is a German chamber orchestra that combines the performance and promotion of contemporary music with the interpretation of classical repertoire. The ensemble is based in Hamburg, where it is an Ensemble in Residence of the Elbphilharmonie.

== History ==
The ensemble was founded in 1994 by members of the Junge Deutsche Philharmonie. After stations in Frankfurt and in Diez an der Lahn, in 2002 the Hamburg became the home of the ensemble. There it established itself as the ensemble in residence of the Laeiszhalle – Musikhalle Hamburg with the concert series Resonanzen. Since January 2017, the residency has continued in the chamber music hall of the Elbphilharmonie. In Hamburg's Schanzenviertel, Ensemble Resonanz has established the concert series urban string since 2011, which combines classical music and club culture. The ensemble consists of 21 regular members, and is self-governing, working without a principal conductor.

Their awards include the Würth Prize of Jeunesses Musicales Germany (2002) and the Rudolf Stilcken Prize for Cultural Communication. From 2002 to 2004, it was ensemble in residence of the Darmstädter Ferienkurse. From 2005 to 2008, it accompanied the construction of the Elbphilharmonie with the concert series "Kaispeicher entern!" in Hamburg-HafenCity.

From 2010 to 2013, the cellist Jean-Guihen Queyras was an Artist in Residence of the ensemble. Tabea Zimmermann followed him in this position from 2013–2015. Other partners of the ensemble are not only composers, soloists and conductors, but also media artists, directors and performing and visual artists. These have include among others Helmut Lachenmann, Beat Furrer, Rebecca Saunders, Fazıl Say, Matthias Goerne, Emilio Pomàrico, Reinhard Goebel, Riccardo Minasi, Imre Kertész, Roger Willemsen, Falk Richter and the RIAS Kammerchor.

Since 2014, the ensemble has been cooperating with the free music radio station ByteFM – also based in the Bunker Hamburg – in the context of a monthly classical music programme.

The ensemble made their debut at the UK Proms on 20 August 2024, with an all-Mozart programme, conducted by Riccardo Minasi, featuring the Sinfonia Concertante in E flat major, played by Clara-Jumi Kang, violin and Timothy Ridout, viola.

== Recordings ==
- Ludwig van Beethoven: Symphony no. 3, Eroica (2026, Harmonia mundi), with Riccardo Minasi
- Antonín Kraft, C.P.E. Bach: Cello Concertos (2024, Harmonia mundi), with Jean-Guihen Queyras, cello
- W.A. Mozart: Symphonies nos. 36 and 38 (2023, Harmonia mundi), with Riccardo Minasi
- Ludwig van Beethoven: Piano concertos no. 4 and "6" (2021, Harmonia mundi), with Gianluca Gascioli
- Mercy seat – winterreise: A Séance between Franz Schubert and Nick Cave (2020, resonanzraum records), with Charly Hübner.
- W.A. Mozart: Symphonies nos. 39–41 (2020, Harmonia mundi), with Riccardo Minasi
- Bryce Dessner: Tenebre (2019, resonanzraum records), with Moses Sumney
- Joseph Haydn: The Seven Last Words (2019, Harmonia mundi), with Riccardo Minasi
- C.P.E. Bach: Cello Concertos (2018, Harmonia mundi), with Jean-Guihen Queyras, cello
- J.S. Bach: Christmas Oratorio (2017, resonanzraum records)
- C.P.E. Bach: 4 symphonies Wq 183, 6 sonatas Wq 184 (2016, E-flat major).
- C.P.E. Bach: 6 Hamburg Symphonies (2014, E flat major)
- Berg / Schönberg: Lyric Suite / Transfigured Night (2014, Harmonia mundi), with Jean-Guihen Queyras, cello
- Hanns Eisler: Serious Songs & Lieder with Piano (2013, Harmonia mundi), with Matthias Görne
- Julia Wolfe: Cruel Sister / Fuel (2011, cantaloupe music), with Brad Lubman
- Manuel Hidalgo: Hacia (2010, kairos), with the WDR Symphony Orchestra Cologne and Lothar Zagrosek
- Iannis Xenakis: Music for Strings (2005, mode records)
- Johann Sebastian Bach: Goldberg Variations (2002, ambitus)
- Michael Gordon: Weather (1997, nonesuch records)
