= Riccardo Minasi =

Italian violinist and conductor

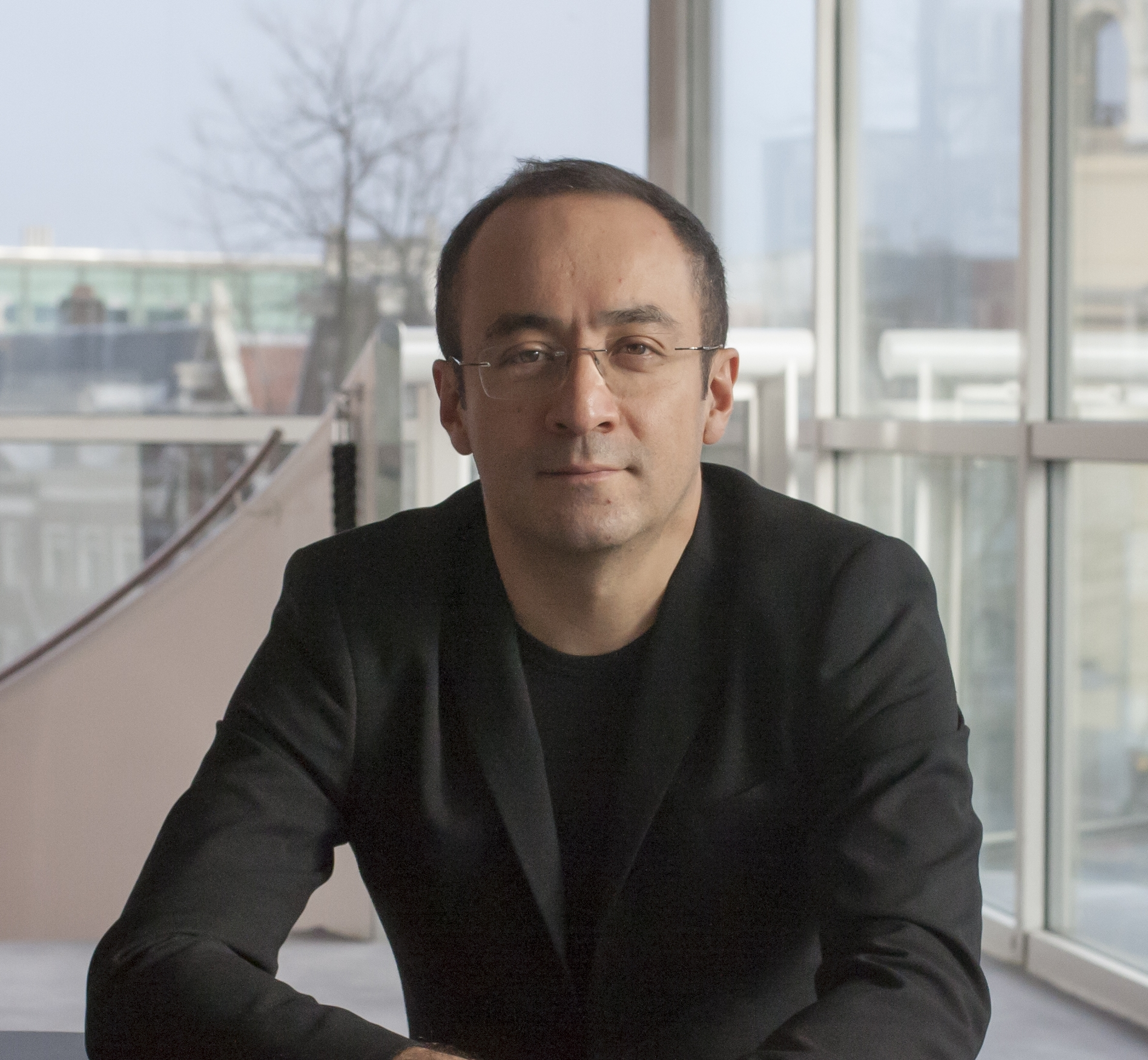
Image of Riccardo Minasi

Riccardo Masahide Minasi (born 1978) is an Italian conductor and violinist.

== Life ==
=== Education ===
Born in Rome, Minasi received his first music lessons from his mother, studying modern violin with Paolo Centurioni and Alfredo Fiorentini at Conservatorio Santa Cecilia. He then turned to the baroque violin and its repertoire, his teachers in this field being Enrico Parizzi, Enrico Gatti and Luigi Mangiocavallo as well as Chiara Banchini at Schola Cantorum Basiliensis.

=== Conducting ===
In 2009, Minasi received an appointment as historical advisor to the Montreal Symphony Orchestra. In 2010, he served as assistant conductor and concertmaster for the Theater Dortmund production of the opera Norma by Bellini with the Balthasar Neumann Ensemble alongside Thomas Hengelbrock.

Minasi was principal conductor of the ensemble Il pomo d'oro from its foundation in 2011 until 2016. The new orchestra already won prizes with its first recording - Vivaldi's L'imperatore - and in its founding year also edited solo albums by the countertenors Max Emanuel Cenčić, Franco Fagioli and Xavier Sabata, as well as an album with Venetian Barcarole.

Minasi has served as music director of the „Carlo Felice“ Opera in Genoa, succeeded Ivor Bolton as chief conductor or the Mozarteum Orchestra Salzburg (2017–2022), was Principal Guest Conductor and Artist-in-Residence of the Ensemble Resonanz at Elbphilharmonie Hamburg (2018–2024), and has been Artistic Director of the "La Scintilla" Orchestra at the Zurich Opera since 2022.

As a guest conductor, he has been invited by various orchestras, including the Sächsische Staatskapelle Dresden, the Berlin Philharmonic, the Royal Concertgebouw Orchestra Amsterdam, the Gürzenich Orchestra Cologne, the Bavarian Radio Symphony Orchestra, the Swedish Radio Symphony Orchestra, the Luxembourg Philharmonic Orchestra, the Orchestre du Capitole de Toulouse, the Orchestra of the Accademia Nazionale di Santa Cecilia, the Mahler Chamber Orchestra, the Chamber Orchestra of Europe, and the Konzerthaus Orchestra Berlin. He has also conducted the Tokyo Metropolitan Orchestra, the Frankfurt Radio Symphony Orchestra, the Toronto Symphony Orchestra, the City of Birmingham Symphony Orchestra, the NDR Radio Philharmonic Orchestra Hannover, the Academy of Ancient Music, the Orchestre National de Lyon, the Orquestra de la Comunitat Valenciana, the London Chamber Orchestra, the Australian Brandenburg Orchestra, the Zurich Chamber Orchestra, the Basel Chamber Orchestra, Concerto Köln, the Hamburg State Philharmonic Orchestra, the Los Angeles Chamber Orchestra, and the Helsinki Baroque Orchestra, where he served as associate conductor from 2008 to 2011.

On August 20, 2024, Riccardo Minasi made his debut in London with Ensemble Resonanz at the UK Proms, with an all-Mozart programme, featuring the Sinfonia Concertante in E flat major, played by Clara-Jumi Kang, violin and Timothy Ridout, viola. When he was invited back in 2025, he conducted Mozart’s opera *The Marriage of Figaro* with the Orchestra of the Age of Enlightenment.

In addition to his work on the concert stage, Riccardo Minasi has also made a name for himself in the world of opera. He has conducted “Norma” in Cologne, Hamburg, Genoa, and Aix-en-Provence; “Les Pêcheurs de perles” at the Salzburg Festival; “La Cenerentola,” “Idomeneo,” “Beatrice di Tenda,” “Il giro di vite,” and “Falstaff” at the Opera "Carlo Felice" in Genoa, “Dialogues des Carmélites” and “Don Giovanni” in Valencia, “Don Giovanni,” “Così fan tutte,” “The Abduction from the Seraglio,” “Orlando Paladino,” “Matrimonio Segreto,” as well as ballets by Christian Spuck set to music by Schnittke, Schumann, and Monteverdi at the Zurich Opera, “Iphigénie en Tauride,” “Alcina,” “The Marriage of Figaro,” “Agrippina,” and “Rodelinda” at the Hamburg State Opera; “Carmen” at the Opéra National de Lyon; “Rinaldo” at the Theater an der Wien; “The Magic Flute,” “Rodelinda,” and “The Marriage of Figaro” at De Nationale Opera. At the Glyndebourne Festival, he conducted “The Marriage of Figaro” and “Così fan tutte”.

=== Violinist ===
He was a soloist as well as concertmaster in numerous ensembles, such as the: Le Concert des Nations under Jordi Savall, the Accademia Bizantina, the Concerto Italiano, with Il Giardino Armonico, the Concerto Vocale Gent under René Jacobs, the Collegium 1704 and the Ensemble 415 under Chiara Banchini. Among the important musicians with whom he has performed are Enrico Onofri, Viktoria Mullova, Albrecht Mayer, Christophe Coin, Sergio Azzolini and Reinhard Goebel. He has also worked as a conductor with several renowned ensembles, including the Kammerakademie Potsdam, the Ensemble Resonanz, the Zurich Chamber Orchestra, the Balthasar-Neumann-Chor und -Ensemble and the Helsinki Baroque Orchestra, of which he has been 1st Kapellmeister since 2008. In 2007 he founded the chamber music ensemble "Musica Antiqua Roma", with which he performs works of the 17th and 18th centuries. One focus is on the forgotten Roman composers from this period.

From 2004 to 2010, Minasi taught chamber music at the Vincenzo Bellini Conservatory in Palermo. He has taught master classes and courses for violin, chamber music and baroque orchestra at the Longy School of Music in Cambridge (US), the Sibelius Academy in Helsinki, the Chinese Culture University in Taipei, the Kùks Residence in the Czech Republic, the Conservatory of Sydney and the Scuola di Musica in Fiesole.

Minasi's works include violins attributed to the violin makers David Tecchler (1666-1748) and Amati (1623) are at his disposal.

Many of the more than 20 CD recordings in which he has participated as a soloist have won recording awards. The recording of Heinrich Ignaz Biber's Rosary Sonatas was entered as an album in the final round of the Midem Classical Award for 2009 with Heinrich Ignaz Franz Biber's Rosary Sonatas.

== Selected Recordings ==
- Heinrich Ignaz Biber, Rosenkranz-Sonaten. ARTS, 2006
- Arcangelo Corelli's Legacy, Violinsonaten von Corelli und seinen Schülern. Passacaille, 2007
- Francesco Veracini, Sonaten für Violine und Bc. Sony, 2009
- Georg Friedrich Händel, Violin Sonatas. Sony, 2011
- Antonio Vivaldi, Concerti per l’imperatore. Naïve, 2012
- Bad Guys. Arien von Georg Friedrich Händel: Xavier Sabata, Il pomo d’oro. harmonia mundi, 2013
- Carl Philipp Emanuel Bach I 6 Hamburg Symphonies, Ensemble Resonanz. Es-Dur, 2014
- Carl Philipp Emanuel Bach II, 4 Symphonies, Wq 183 – 6 Sonatas, Wq 184, Ensemble Resonanz. Es-Dur, 2016
- Wolfgang Amadeus Mozart: Symphonies Nos. 39, 40 & 41 'Jupiter', Ensemble Resonanz. harmonia mundi, 2020
- Giovanni Battista Pergolesi: Stabat Mater, Ensemble Resonanz. harmonia mundi, 2021
- Ludwig van Beethoven: Piano Concertos Op. 58 & Op. 61a, Gianluca Cascioli, Ensemble Resonanz. harmonia mundi, 2021
- „My Christmas“. Diana Damrau, Knabenchor Hannover, NDR Vokalensemble, NDR Radiophilharmonie, Riccardo Minasi, Richard Whilds, Matthias Höfs, Raphael Alpermann, Gabriel Smallwood. Warner, 2022
- Chopin: Piano Concerto Nr. 1 / Mazurkas Nr. 1, 5, 13–15, 19, 25, 32, 38, 43. Margarita Höhenrieder, La Scintilla, Riccardo Minasi. Naxos, 2022
- Strauss: Metamorphosen & Wind Sonatina Nr. 1. Riccardo Minasi, Mozarteumorchester Salzburg. Berlin Classics, 2023
- Wolfgang Amadeus Mozart: Symphonies Nos. 36 'Linz' & 38 'Prague', Ensemble Resonanz. harmonia mundi, 2023
- Antonín Kraft, Carl Philipp Emanuel Bach: Cello Concertos. Jean-Guihen Queyras, Riccardo Minasi, Ensemble Resonanz. harmonia mundi, 2024
- Mozart: Haffner-Akademie. Symphonie Nr. 35 „Haffner“, Arien. Ensemble Resonanz, Riccardo Minasi, Anna Prohaska. harmonia mundi, 2024
- Beethoven: Eroica. Ensemble Resonanz, Riccardo Minasi. harmonia mundi, 2026
