= Ensemble Matheus =

French baroque orchestra

Ensemble Matheus is a French baroque orchestra. Based in Brittany, the ensemble gives concerts in a number of French cities, including Brest at Le Quartz, where it has enjoyed a residency since 1996, Vannes (Théâtre Anne de Bretagne), and Plougonvelin (Espace Keraudy). The ensemble receives funding from the Conseil Régional de Bretagne (Regional Council of Brittany), Conseil Général du Finistère, the city of Brest, the Ministère de la Culture et de la Communication - Direction Régionale des Affaires Culturelles (DRAC) Bretagne (Ministry of Culture and Communication - Regional Directorate of Cultural Affairs Brittany), the Société Inter Parfums, and the Mécénat Musical Société Générale.

The Ensemble Matheus was founded in 1991 with the members of the Quatuor Matheus (Matheus Quartet), Jean-Christophe Spinosi, Laurence Paugam, Françoise Paugam, and Thierry Runarvot, as the core of the ensemble, and with Spinosi as artistic leader. Whilst the ensemble has a primary focus on baroque music, it also performs works from the 19th and 20th centuries, expanding the ensemble as needed. In addition to concert work, the ensemble has been the opera orchestra for productions at such venues and companies as the Théâtre des Champs-Élysées, Théâtre du Châtelet, the Opéra de Paris and the Opéra de Nice. The ensemble began a regular residency at the Théâtre du Châtelet in 2007. Outside France, the ensemble has performed in opera productions in such cities as Bilbao and Oslo.

In the US, the Ensemble Matheus first performed at Carnegie Hall in February 2008. In the UK, the ensemble first appeared at The Proms in September 2010. The ensemble regularly collaborates with individual artists such as Philippe Jaroussky and Marie-Nicole Lemieux.

The Ensemble Matheus has recorded commercially for the Naïve and Virgin Classics labels. The Ensemble Matheus has served as the featured instrumental ensemble in CD recordings of operas such as Vivaldi's La verità in cimento, Orlando furioso, Griselda, and La fida ninfa, and on DVD in a production of Rossini's La pietra del paragone.
