= Ivor Bolton =

British musician

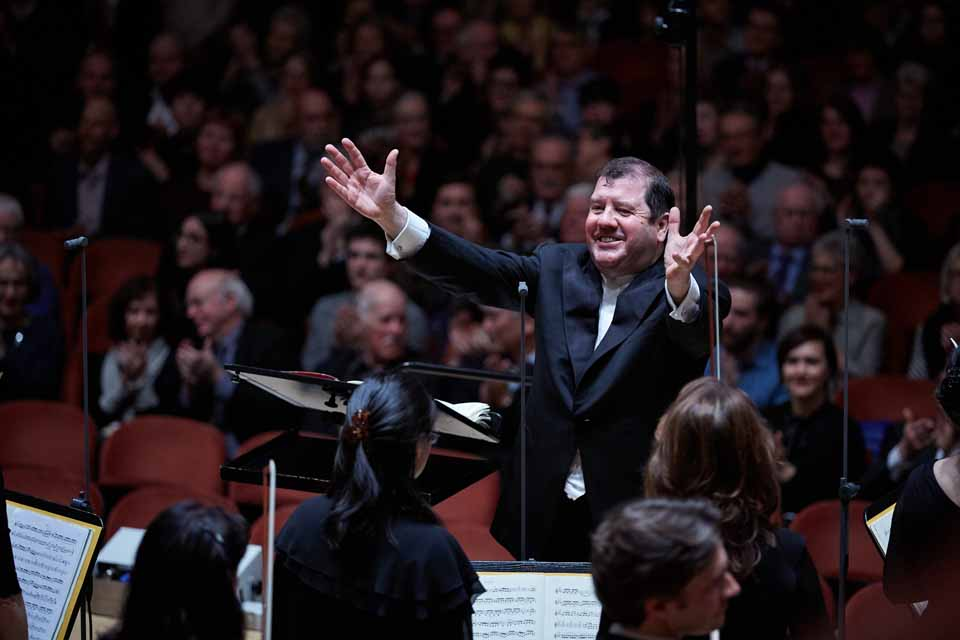
Ivor Bolton

Ivor Bolton CBE (born 17 May 1958) is an English conductor and harpsichordist.

== Early life and education ==
Bolton was born in Blackrod, Greater Manchester, England. He studied at Queen Elizabeth's Grammar School, Blackburn and Clare College, Cambridge (1976–80), and was conducting scholar at the Royal College of Music (1980–81). He later trained as a répétiteur at the National Opera Studio and was appointed conductor of Schola Cantorum of Oxford.

== Career ==
Bolton was assistant chorus master and staff conductor from 1982 to 1984 for Glyndebourne Festival Opera. He made his operatic conducting debut in 1986 with Stravinsky's The Rake's Progress for Opera 80. He later became music director of Glyndebourne Touring Opera (now Glyndebourne on Tour) from 1992 to 1997. He was principal conductor of the Scottish Chamber Orchestra from 1994 to 1996. He has also held leadership positions whilst he was musical director of St James's Church, Piccadilly in London from 1982 to 1990 with the St James's Baroque Players and The St James Singers (with whom he recorded J. S. Bach's harpsichord concertos BWV 1052–1058 in 1987, Charpentier's Te Deum H.146 and Missa Assumpta est Maria H.11 in 1996) and the Lufthansa Festival of Baroque Music. Other work with period ensembles has included collaboration with the Dresdner Festspielorchester (Dresden Festival Orchestra), which began in 2012.

From 2004 to 2016, Bolton was Chief Conductor of the Mozarteum Orchestra of Salzburg, with which he appeared at The Proms in 2006. He took the title of Ehrendirigent (Honorary Conductor) with the Mozarteum Orchestra Salzburg as of the 2016–2017 season. In February 2014, the Teatro Real in Madrid named Bolton its next music director, effective from the 2015–16 season, with an initial contract of five years. Bolton concluded his tenure as music director of the Teatro Real at the close of the 2024–2025 season.

In June 2015, the Sinfonieorchester Basel announced the appointment of Bolton as its next chief conductor, as of the 2016–2017 season, with an initial contract of 4 years. In March 2018, the orchestra announced the extension of Bolton's contract through the 2024–2025 season. Bolton concluded his tenure as chief conductor of the Sinfonieorchester Basel at the close of the 2024–2025 season.

With the Mozarteum Orchestra Salzburg, Bolton has made commercial recordings of music by W. A. Mozart, Joseph Haydn, Michael Haydn, Hector Berlioz, and Anton Bruckner. In addition, he has conducted commercial recordings of Handel's Theodora from the Salzburg Festival, Mayr's Medea in Corinto from Munich, Janáček's Jenůfa from the Teatro Real Madrid, Cavalli's Ercole amante from the Netherlands Opera, and Mozart's Zaide and La finta giardiniera from Salzburg.

Bolton was appointed Commander of the Order of the British Empire (CBE) in the 2023 Birthday Honours for services to music.

== Personal life ==
Bolton is married to the musicologist, critic, and broadcaster Tess Knighton, whom he met at Cambridge. The couple have a son, and reside in Barcelona.

Cultural offices
Preceded by Graeme Jenkins	Music Director, Glyndebourne on Tour; 1992–1997	Succeeded by Louis Langrée
Preceded by Jukka-Pekka Saraste	Principal Conductor, Scottish Chamber Orchestra; 1994–1996	Succeeded by Joseph Swensen
Preceded by Hubert Soudant	Chief Conductor, Mozarteum Orchestra Salzburg; 2004–2016	Succeeded by Riccardo Minasi
Preceded by Jesús López Cobos	Music Director, Teatro Real, Madrid; 2015–2025	Succeeded by Gustavo Gimeno
Preceded by Dennis Russell Davies	Chief Conductor, Sinfonieorchester Basel; 2016–2025	Succeeded by Markus Poschner
