= Evgeni Koroliov =

Russian pianist

Evgeni Alexandrovich Koroliov (Russian: Евгений Александрович Королёв; born 1 October 1949) is a Russian classical pianist.

Koroliov studied at the Moscow Conservatory. Since 1978, he has been a teacher at the Hochschule für Musik und Theater Hamburg. He lives in Hamburg with his wife Ljupka Hadzigeorgieva. Together they also form a musical duo ("Duo Koroliov").

He is mainly associated with the keyboard repertoire of J.S. Bach, including the complete Well-Tempered Clavier, the Art of Fugue, Inventions and Sinfonias. He is also known for his performances of Haydn, Beethoven, Chopin, Debussy, some Mozart and Schumann, and more modern works like those of Shostakovich.
