= Mirare =

French classical music record label

Mirare is a French classical music record label founded by René Martin and François-René Martin. The label was created for recordings of the La Folle Journée, a festival which was founded in 1995.
