= Victor Julien-Laferrière =

French cellist

Victor Julien-Laferrière (born 1990 in Paris) is a French cellist and conductor who won the first prize of the Queen Elisabeth Competition in 2017.
