= Alan Curtis (harpsichordist) =

American musician (1934–2015)

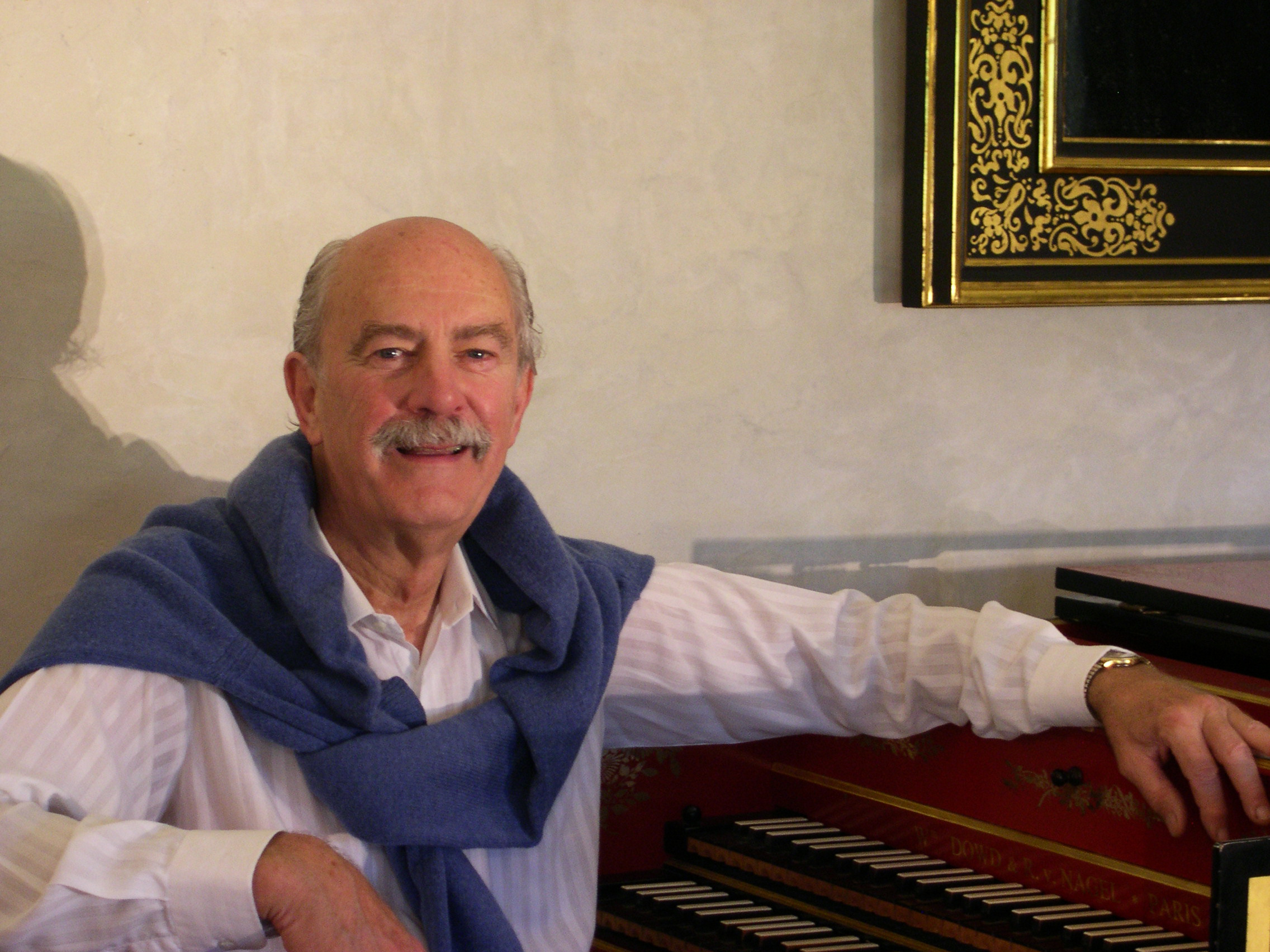
Alan Curtis at home, Florence 2006

Alan Curtis (November 17, 1934 – July 15, 2015) was an American harpsichordist, musicologist, and conductor of baroque opera.

Born in Mason, Michigan, Curtis graduated from studies at the University of Illinois, and received his PhD in 1960 with a dissertation on the keyboard music of Sweelinck. He then relocated to Amsterdam to work with Gustav Leonhardt, with whom he subsequently recorded a number of Bach's concerti for harpsichord. In the 1960s and 1970s, he made a number of recordings of solo harpsichord music including albums dedicated to the keyboard music of Rameau and the works of Johann Sebastian Bach, such as his recording of the Goldberg Variations made on a 1728 Christian Zell harpsichord.

Following an academic career divided between UC Berkeley and Europe, Curtis devoted his time to performing dramatic music from Monteverdi to Mozart. As a student in the 1950s, he was the first modern harpsichordist to examine problems surrounding Louis Couperin's unmeasured preludes for harpsichord, and to commission the first modern copy of a chitarrone and the first chromatic (split-key) harpsichord constructed in the 20th century. He also researched operas from the baroque and pre-baroque eras, using period instruments and authentic choreography.

In the late 1970s, Curtis founded the European ensemble Il complesso barocco, with which he made a number of commercial recordings for such labels as Virgin Classics, Deutsche Grammophon (Archiv), and Deutsche Harmonia Mundi.
