= Marie-Nicole Lemieux =

Canadian opera singer

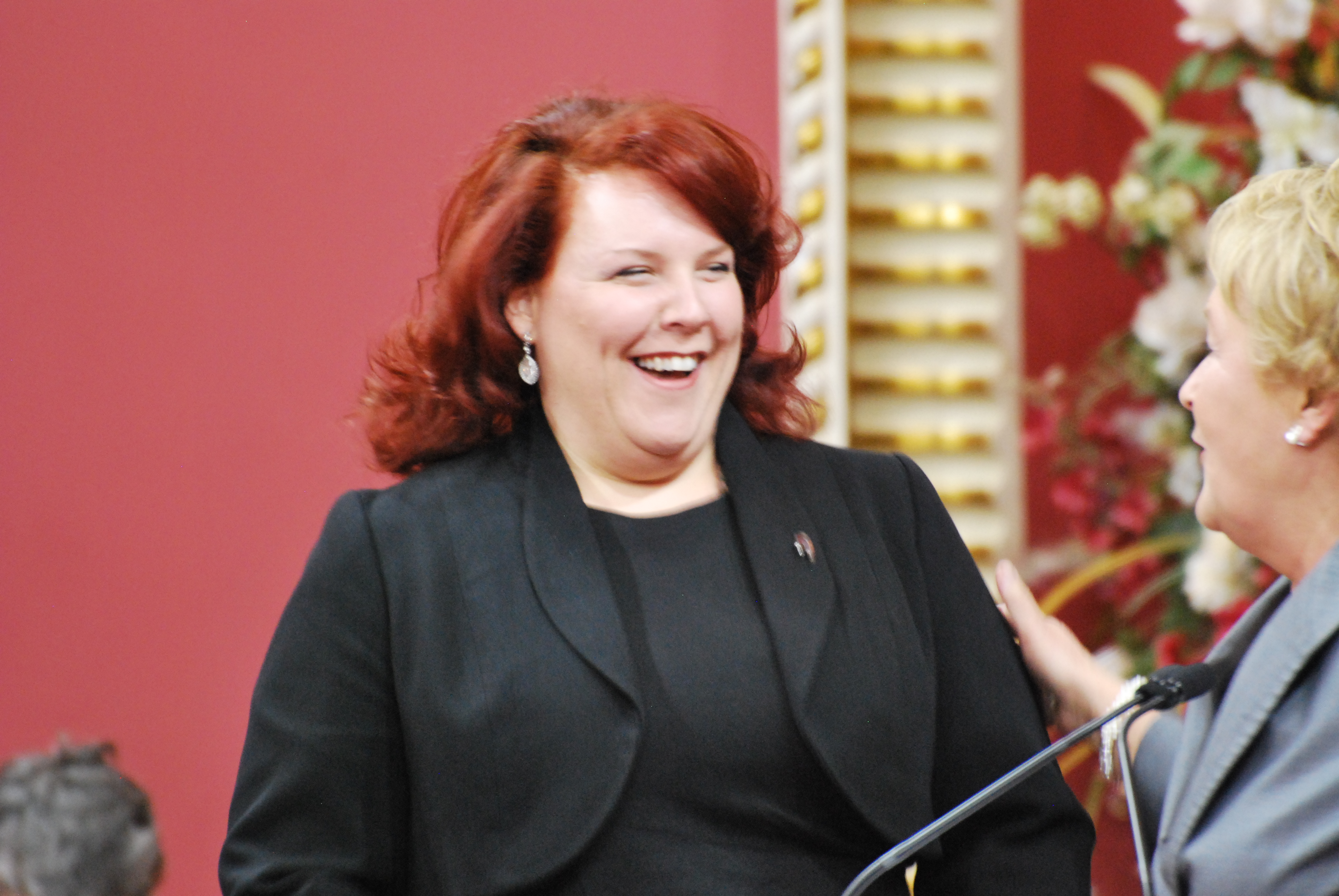
- Lemieux at the awarding of the National Order of Quebec in June 2013.

Background information
- Born: June 26, 1975 (age 51); Dolbeau-Mistassini, Quebec
- Occupation: Contralto singer
- Years active: 2000–present
- Website: www.marienicolelemieux.com

Marie-Nicole Lemieux, C.M., C.Q. (born June 26, 1975) is a Canadian contralto. In 2000, she became the first Canadian to win first prize at the Queen Elizabeth International Music Competition in Belgium.

== Early life and education ==
Marie-Nicole Lemieux was born in 1975 in Dolbeau-Mistassini, Quebec. In 1994, Lemieux entered the Chicoutimi Conservatoire de musique and began studying voice with Rosaire Simard. After graduating with a degree in Vocal pedagogy in 1998, Lemieux continued with postgraduate studies at the Conservatoire de musique du Québec à Montréal with Marie Daveluy. Lemieux graduated with a Masters in Vocal pedagogy in 2000.

== Career ==
Lemieux won first prize at both the Jeunesse Musicale du Canada's Joseph Rouleau Competition in Montreal and the Queen Elisabeth International Music Competition for Opera in Brussels in 2000. Lemieux also took second prize in the separate competition for Lieder at the Queen Elisabeth International Competition. Lemieux's success was followed by invitations to perform and/or audition with many orchestras and opera companies.

Lemieux has done concert and recital work with the Los Angeles Philharmonic, Montreal Symphony Orchestra, Orchestre National de France, Orchestre national du Capitole de Toulouse, Orchestre symphonique de la Monnaie, Orchestre Philharmonique de Radio France, The Academy of Ancient Music, the Rotterdam Philharmonic Orchestra, Les Musiciens du Louvre, the London Philharmonic Orchestra, the Deutsches Symphonie-Orchester Berlin, Ensemble Matheus, Les Violons du Roy, Ensemble orchestral de Paris, Modo Antiquo, the Singapore Symphony Orchestra, St. Petersburg Philharmonic Orchestra, Montreal Symphony Orchestra, The National Arts Centre Orchestra in Ottawa, the Tafelmusik Baroque Orchestra, the Orchestre symphonique de Québec, the Toronto Symphony Orchestra and the Edmonton Symphony Orchestra among others.

She has sung with conductors such as Richard Bradshaw, Franz-Paul Decker, Charles Dutoit, Paul Goodwin, Bernard Labadie, Sir Neville Marriner, Kurt Masur, Marc Minkowski, Kent Nagano, John Nelson, Gianandrea Noseda, Peter Oundjian, Michel Plasson, Federico Maria Sardelli, Michael Schonwandt, Marc Soustrot, Yoav Talmi, Ilan Volkov and Pinchas Zukerman among others.

She frequently performs Baroque opera, including operas of Handel and Vivaldi. She has received praise for her stage presence and communicative power.

In 2002, Lemieux made her professional operatic debut in the role of Cornelia in Handel's Giulio Cesare with the Canadian Opera Company.

In 2003, she participated in a Jeunesses Musicales Canada tour in Quebec.

In 2005, she made her debut with the Staatsoper Berlin, performing in Monteverdi's Il ritorno d'Ulisse in patria under the baton of René Jacobs. Later that same year, she performed the role of Mitrena in the world premiere of Vivaldi's Motezuma at the De Doelen Centre in Rotterdam.

In 2006, Lemieux appeared as Alisa in Donizetti's Lucia di Lammermoor with Opéra de Orange and Anna in Berlioz's Les Troyens with Strasbourg Opera.

In 2007, she made her debut with Opéra de Nancy in the title role of Handel's Giulio Cesare, her debut with Opéra de Genève as Polinesso in Handel's Ariodante, and her debut at the Théâtre des Champs-Élysées as Genevieve in Debussy's Pelléas et Mélisande, under the baton of Bernard Haitink.

She also performed the title role in Vivaldi's Orlando furioso at the Edinburgh Festival.

In 2008, Lemieux sang the title role in Albert Roussel's Padmavati at the Théâtre du Châtelet, Genevieve in Debussy's Pelléas et Mélisande at the Berlin State Opera, the title role in Handel's Orlando at De Nederlandse Opera, Mistress Quickly in Verdi's Falstaff at the Théâtre des Champs-Élysées, and Marthe in Gounod's Faust at the Opéra de Orange.

In 2009, Lemieux sang Geneviève in Pelléas et Mélisande at the Theater an der Wien, Mistress Quickly at the Bavarian State Opera and the Glyndebourne Festival, and Zita in Gianni Schicchi at the Opéra de Montréal among other engagements.

In the summer of 2010, she performed in recital in Spain and in the title role of Vivaldi's Orlando Furioso.

In 2015, Lemieux was appointed a member of the Order of Canada.

In July 2022, Lemieux performed Saint-Saëns, Massenet with the Monte-Carlo Philharmonic Orchestra (OPMC) at the Prince’s Palace, Monaco. In September 2022, she performed Mahler: Symphony No. 2 “Resurrection” with the Cleveland Orchestra.

In 2024, she performed at Le Printemps des Arts de Monte-Carlo, and at Bastille Opera house, in Falstaff.

== Recordings ==
- 2020 – Mer(s) - Elgar, Chausson, Joncières, Erato / Warner Classics (France)
- 2017 — Berlioz: Les Troyens, Erato Warner classics
- 2014 – Chansons perpétuelles, Naïve Classique (France)
- 2008 – Schumann: Frauenliebe Und-Leben, Naïve Classique (France)
- 2008 – Vivaldi: Nisi Dominus, Stabat Mater, Naïve Classique (France)
- 2006 – Vivaldi : Griselda, Naïve Classique (France)
- 2005 – L'heure exquise, Naïve Classique (France)
- 2004 – Brahms : Lieder, Analekta (Canada)
- 2004 – Händel : Rodelinda, Deutsche Grammophon (Germany)
- 2004 – Vivaldi : Orlando Furioso, Naïve Classique (France)
- 2003 – Scarlatti : Salve Regina – Vivaldi : Stabat Mater & Concerti Per Archi, Analekta (Canada)
- 2002 – Händel : Cantates italiennes et autres oeuvres, Analekta (Canada)
- 2001 – Mozart : Requiem (version Levine), Dorian Recordings (U.S.A.)
- 2000 – Recording of the laureates of the International Queen Elisabeth Competition, Cyprès (Belgium)
- 2000 – Berlioz, Mahler et Wagner, Cyprès (Belgium)

== Awards ==
- 2008 – Opus Award, Concert of the Year (for « Marie-Nicole Lemieux, Encountering a Voice »)
- 2007 – Opus Award, Expansion Overseas (Canada)
- 2006 – Georg Solti Prize, Excellence of a Young Discographic Career (France)
- 2006 – Belgian Press Association, Young Soloist of the Year (Belgium)
- 2005 – Opus Award, Recording of the Year – Classical Musique, romantic, postromantic et impressionist (Canada)
- 2005 – Victoires de la musique classique in Paris, Best Recording of the Year de l'année (France)
- 2003 - Opus Award, Concert of the Year 2003 in Medieval, Renaissance et Baroque music (Canada)
- 2003 – Juno Award, For the album « Le Requiem de Mozart » (Canada)
- 2001 – Opus Award, Discovery of the Year (Canada)
- 2001 – La Presse, Personality of the Year leased by the Montreal newspaper. (Canada)
- 2001 – Virginia-Parker Prize, Granted by the Canada Council for the Arts (Canada)
- 2000 – Queen Elisabeth Competition : First prize, Queen Fabiola's prize and Special prize of the Lied (Belgium)
- 2000 – Joseph-Rouleau Prize, (Premier Prix)Concours national des Jeunesses musicales du Canada (Canada)
