= Amanda Thompson =

Amanda Thompson may refer to:

- Amanda Thompson (basketball) (born 1987), American basketball player
- Amanda Thompson (businesswoman) (born 1962), owner of Blackpool Pleasure Beach
- Amanda Thompson (pianist) (born 1980), British pianist
- Amanda Purvis (born 1990), American archer, married name Thompson
