= 1181 Lilith =

Metallic main-belt asteroid

Discovery
- Discovered by: B. Jekhovsky
- Discovery site: Algiers Obs.
- Discovery date: 11 February 1927

Designations
- Named after: Lili Boulanger (French composer)
- Alternative designations: 1927 CQ · 1925 QF; 1943 WC · 1953 CA; 1964 PG · A914 BA
- Minor planet category: main-belt · (middle) background
- Symbol: (astrological)

Orbital characteristics
- Epoch 31 May 2020 (JD 2459000.5)
- Uncertainty parameter 0
- Observation arc: 89.50 yr (32,689 d)
- Aphelion: 3.1851 AU
- Perihelion: 2.1457 AU
- Semi-major axis: 2.6654 AU
- Eccentricity: 0.1950
- Orbital period (sidereal): 4.35 yr (1,589 d)
- Mean anomaly: 219.56°
- Mean motion: 0° 13^{m} 35.4^{s} / day
- Inclination: 5.6012°
- Longitude of ascending node: 260.70°
- Argument of perihelion: 156.05°

Physical characteristics
- Mean diameter: 20.492±0.276 km
- Synodic rotation period: 15.04±0.01 h
- Geometric albedo: 0.106±0.011
- Spectral type: SMASS = X
- Absolute magnitude (H): 11.3

1181 Lilith (prov. designation: 1927 CQ) is a metallic asteroid from the middle region of the asteroid belt, approximately 23 kilometers (14 miles) in diameter. It was discovered on 11 February 1927, by Russian–French astronomer Benjamin Jekhowsky at Algiers Observatory in Algeria, Northern Africa, and named after French composer Lili Boulanger.

== Classification and orbit ==
Lilith is a non-family asteroid of the main belt's background population when applying the hierarchical clustering method to its proper orbital elements. It orbits the Sun in the middle asteroid belt at a distance of 2.1–3.2 AU once every 4 years and 4 months (1,587 days). Its orbit has an eccentricity of 0.20 and an inclination of 6° with respect to the ecliptic. First observed as A914 BA at Simeiz Observatory in 1914, Lilith's observation arc begins 7 years after its official discovery observation, with its first used observation made at Konkoly Observatory in 1934.

== Naming ==
This minor planet was named by Jekhowsky for Marie Juliette Boulanger (1893–1918), nicknamed Lili. She was the younger sister of Nadia Boulanger and daughter of Ernest Boulanger.

== Physical characteristics ==
Lilith is an X-type asteroid in the Bus–Binzel SMASS taxonomy. It has also been classified as a P-type asteroid by NASA's space-based Wide-field Infrared Survey Explorer (WISE).

=== Rotation period ===
In February 2014, a rotational lightcurve of Lilith was obtained by Italian astronomer Andrea Ferrero at the Bigmuskie Observatory (B88) in Mombercelli, Italy. The photometric observations rendered a period of 15.04±0.01 hours with a brightness amplitude of 0.11 in magnitude (U=2).

=== Diameter and albedo ===
According to NASA's WISE telescope with its subsequent NEOWISE mission, Lilith measures (20.492±0.276) kilometers in diameter and its surface has an albedo of (0.106±0.011), while the Collaborative Asteroid Lightcurve Link assumes an albedo of 0.10, and calculates a diameter of 24.2 kilometers with an absolute magnitude of 11.2. The WISE team also published an alternative mean diameter (22.133±0.254 km) and an albedo of (0.116±0.022).
