= Faust et Hélène =

1913 cantata by Lili Boulanger

- Opera by Lili Boulanger
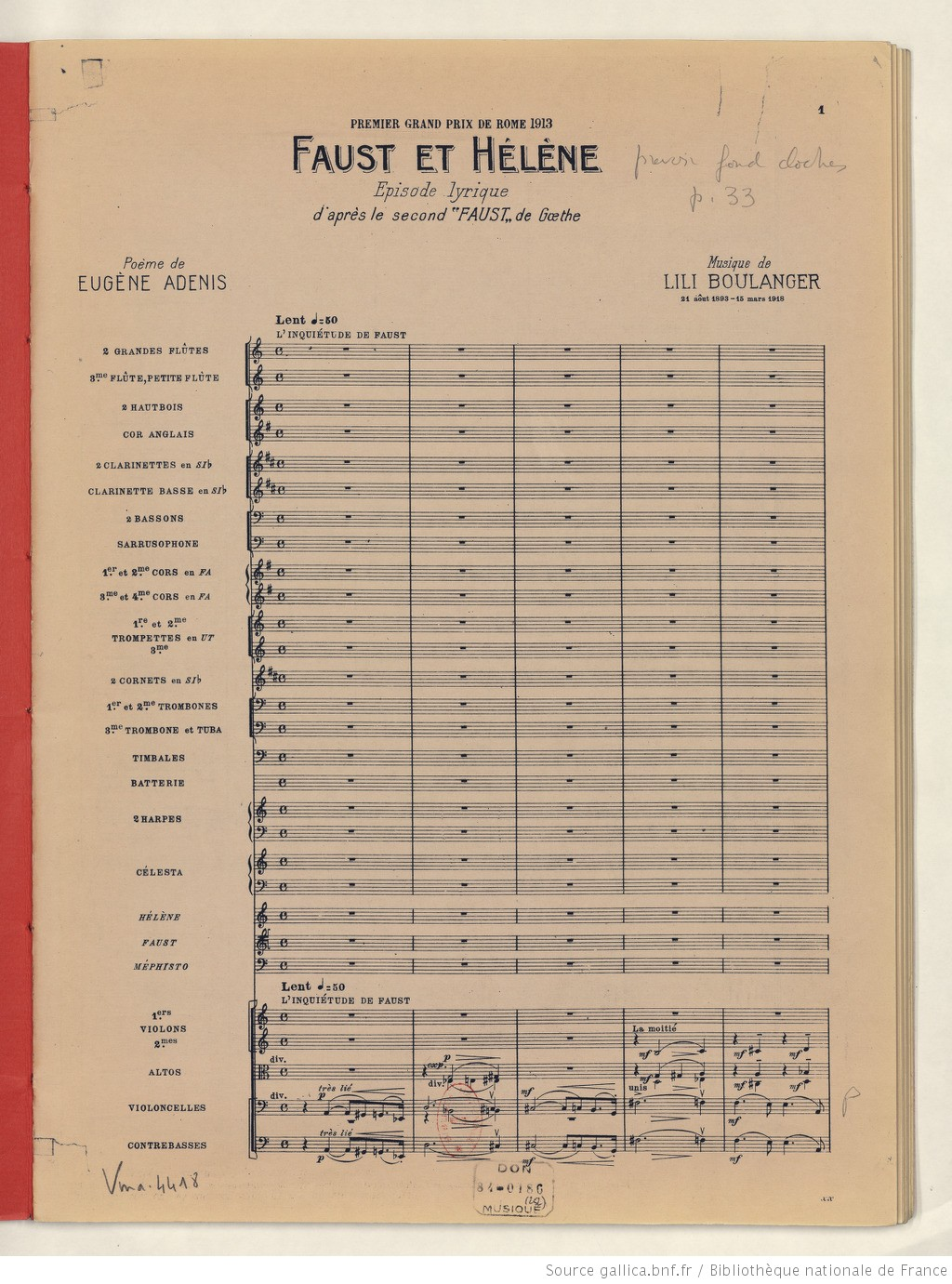
- First page of the Ricordi edition (1920)
- Librettist: Eugène Adenis
- Language: French
- Based on: Faust by Johann Wolfgang von Goethe

Faust et Hélène is a cantata (occasionally staged as an opera) written by Lili Boulanger in 1913 to a libretto by Eugène Adenis. It was written for the final round of the Prix de Rome music competition, which she then won, becoming the first woman to receive its first prize.

== Background ==
In 1835, Boulanger’s father won the Prix de Rome for his cantata, Achille. Women were not allowed to enter the Prix de Rome before 1903, as they were not permitted to study composition at the Paris Conservatoire at that time. The Prix opened to women in 1903; Juliette Toutain and Hélène Fleury were the first women to enter the Prix de Rome music competition. Fleury was the first woman to win a prize, earning the Deuxième Second Grand Prix in 1904. Lili Boulanger’s elder sister, Nadia, applied to the competition four times but never earned first prize; in 1908, she earned second prize for her cantata La Sirène. Inspired by her father’s win and her sister’s pursuit of the prize, Lili Boulanger entered the competition in 1912 at eighteen years old. During a performance of her first cantata, Maïa, Lili collapsed from illness and withdrew from the competition.

In 1913 she reentered with her cantata Soir sur la plaine as the first round composition. She composed Faust et Hélène for the final round, finally winning the prize alongside Claude Delvincourt. Per the competition's rules, Faust et Hélène was composed in a villa over a span of three weeks. During this time, Boulanger had no access to a piano or any musical instrument.

== Performance history ==
Faust et Hélène received many performances during Boulanger's short lifetime. In modern times, the work has been recorded by the BBC Philharmonic and Kristiansand Symphony Orchestra (2013), and performed in concert by the Royal Stockholm Philharmonic Orchestra. In 2022, the work received a concert performance by the Radio Filharmonisch Orkest and a staged performance by the New Camerata Opera on a double-bill with Maurice Ravel's one-act opera, L'heure espagnole. The Lithuanian National Symphony Orchestra produced a concert performance of the work in 2023.Faust et Hélène was performed by the London Philharmonic Orchestra under Karina Canellakis in October 2025.

== Roles ==
Role	Voice Type
Hélène	Mezzo-soprano
Faust	Tenor
Méphistophélès	Baritone

== Synopsis ==
The cantata begins with Méphistophélès, the Devil, describing a beautiful sunrise. Faust, dreaming of Hélène, appears alongside Méphistophélès who chides him for forgetting his first love, Marguerite, so soon. Méphistophélès sings “Marguerite seems no more than a distant memory…” Faust insists he must pursue Hélène. He is persuaded by the demon to sell his soul to eternal damnation in return for seeing the beautiful Hélène, who is already gone, just one more time.

Faust enters a troubled sleep, so Méphistophélès sends spirits to watch over him. Faust wakes up and demands that Méphistophélès summon Hélène. Hélène is summoned, but rejects Faust's love as she does not want more men to die for her name. Faust persists, kissing Hélène and filling her with desire and the awareness that she is yet again alive. Méphistophélès interrupts their passion, informing the pair that Hélène must be taken back to the grave or Faust will be forced down to hell. Faust is so enamored with her that he cannot let her go, until the ghost of Paris comes forward from a crowd of ghostly figures from the Trojan War, conjured by Méphistophélès, to claim her. Faust attempts to fight the ghostly army but does not succeed. The cantata explores Hélène's sexual agency as a woman and her power over men.

== Musical analysis ==
A typical performance of Faust et Hélène lasts roughly 30 minutes. The work is late-romantic in style and references Parsifal and Tannhäuser by Wagner. The cantata is described as "one of the last in a long line of Wagnerian French works." It has also been said to be influenced by the contemporary orchestral writing of Debussy. Boulanger moved away from some of the stylistic elements which make up Faust in her later compositions.

In addition to the voices, the work is scored for 3 flutes (one doubling piccolo), 2 oboes, English horn, 2 B-flat clarinets, bass clarinet, 2 bassoons, sarrusophone, 4 French horns, 3 trumpets, 2 cornets, 3 trombones, tuba, timpani, percussion, two harps, celeste, and strings. Contrabassoon is a modern substition for sarrusophone.

Boulanger highlights the crossover in tenor and mezzo vocal ranges; perfect unisons between Faust and Hélène symbolize the pair’s eternal love during their duet. There are moments when the tenor voice sings higher than the mezzo, indicating Faust’s struggle to ever part with his beloved.
