= D'un matin de printemps =

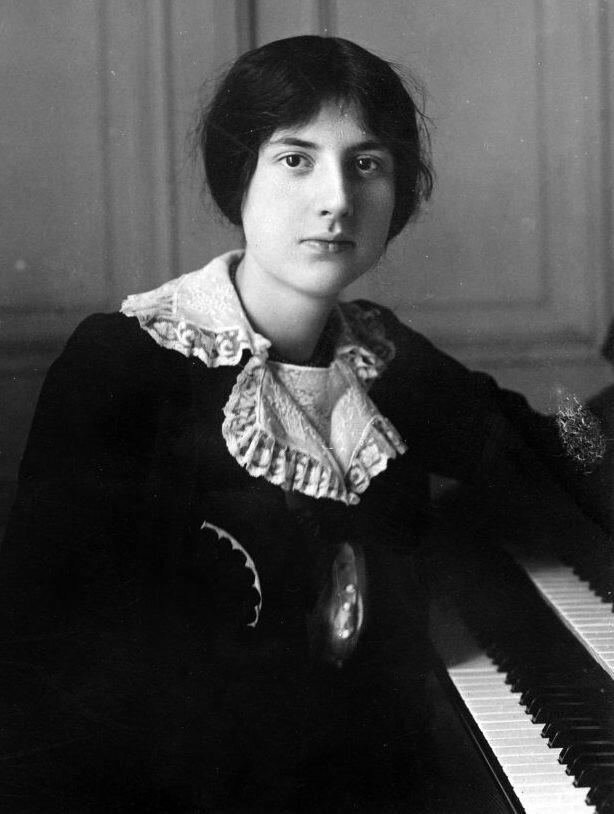
Lili Boulanger in 1913

D'un matin de printemps (Of a spring morning) is a musical work by Lili Boulanger. It exists in various versions, for violin and piano, for flute and piano (both 1917), for piano trio, or for orchestra (both 1918).

The piece is one of Boulanger's last compositions.

== History ==
Originally composed as a duet for violin and piano, from the spring of 1917 the work was adapted as a trio version for violin, cello, and piano in 1917, and as a duet for flute and piano in the same year. In January 1918, Boulanger wrote an orchestral version. D'un matin de printemps was the last orchestral work composed by Boulanger before her death in 1918.

== Analysis ==
Contrary to the common characteristics of much of her œuvre, D'un matin de printemps exudes a charming, ebullient and optimistic character. The Belgian musicologist Harry Halbreich wrote:

D'un matin de printemps est dans l'ensemble un Scherzo à la verve primesautière, à l'orchestration aérée et transparente, mais on y voit surgir au milieu une gradation d'orchestre véhémente qui révèle la douleur sous-jacente à cette sérénité si précaire.

The music critic Gerald Larner wrote that it contains more accents of Debussy than the rest of her work.

== Discography ==
- Yehudi Menuhin (violin) and Clifford Curzon (piano), EMI (1967)
- Olivier Charlier (violin) and Émile Naoumoff (piano), Marco Polo (1993)
- Luxembourg Philharmonic Orchestra directed by Mark Stringer, Timpani (1998)
- BBC Philharmonic directed by Yan Pascal Tortelier, Chandos (1999)
