= Two Hearts, One Love =

Two Hearts, One Love may refer to:

- "2 Hearts 1 Love", song by 911
- "Two Hearts, One Love", a song by Kenny Rogers on the album What About Me?
- "Two Hearts, One Love", a song by Shania Twain on the album The Complete Limelight Sessions
- "Two Hearts, One Love", a song on Lesley Garrett's album Travelling Light
