= Rigacci =

Rigacci is a surname. Notable people with the surname include:

- Susanna Rigacci (born 1960), Swedish-born Italian singer/soprano
- Bruno Rigacci (1921–2019), Italian composer
