= Lesley Garrett =

English soprano

Lesley Garrett CBE
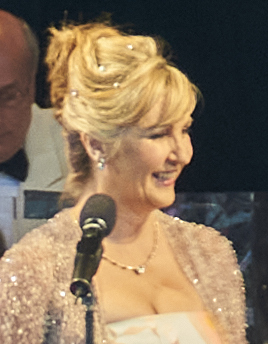

Background information
- Born: 10 April 1955 (age 71); Thorne, Doncaster, England
- Genres: Classical, classical-crossover
- Occupations: Singer–songwriter; musician; broadcaster; media personality
- Years active: 1979–present
- Labels: Decca; Universal Classics and Jazz; Universal Music International
- Website: Official site

Lesley Garrett is an English soprano singer, musician, broadcaster and media personality who is noted for being at home in opera and "crossover music".

== Early life and education ==
Garrett was born on 10 April 1955 in the Yorkshire town of Thorne. She attended Thorne Fieldside Infant and Junior Schools and Thorne Grammar School. As she grew up she inherited her family's love of music. Her grandfather Colin Wall was a classical pianist; her father Derek worked as a railway signalman and then as a schoolteacher at Hatfield Woodhouse Primary School, eventually going on to become a headmaster. They lived nearby just south of the village; her mother Margaret (née Wall) was a talented singing seamstress and became the school secretary at Lesley's primary school. She has two sisters, Jill and Kay, one step-sister, Louise, and two step-brothers named Robert and Nicholas. While a student at the Royal Academy of Music she worked as a life model.

== Music ==
Garrett has had an extensive music career. A graduate of the Royal Academy of Music and an alumna of the prestigious National Opera Studio, she won the Decca Prize of the Kathleen Ferrier Award in 1979, thereby launching her career. Her professional debut, in 1979, was as Amor in Orontea at the music festival in Batignano. She subsequently sang, in 1980, Alice in Le comte Ory at the London Coliseum and Dorinda in Orlando at the Wexford Festival, in 1981, also at Wexford, the title role in Zaide, in 1982 Sophie in Werther with Opera North and in 1984 Damigella in L'incoronazione di Poppea at Glyndebourne. From 1984, as principal soprano at English National Opera, she became well known for her performances in productions of the operas Serse, Le Nozze di Figaro, Così fan tutte, Die Fledermaus and The Mikado.

Garrett has performed across the world, in countries throughout Europe, and also the United States, Australia, Russia, Brazil, Japan, Malaysia, Taiwan and South Korea. She has also sung opera and pop classics with Bryan Ferry, Eurythmics and Mick Hucknall to celebrate the arrival of the new century on Millennium Eve in the grounds at the Royal Observatory and National Maritime Museum.

She played the lead role of Hanna Glawari in the Welsh National Opera's production of The Merry Widow, which toured the United Kingdom in 2005. In 2006, she sang the role of Mother Abbess in Andrew Lloyd Webber's revival of The Sound of Music. In 2008, she joined the cast of Carousel as Nettie Fowler. The production toured the UK and then transferred to the West End's Savoy Theatre. In 2013, she returned to opera with the monodrama La Voix humaine for Opera North.

She created the role of Val in Pleasure, the first opera by Mark Simpson, directed by Tim Albery and premiered at the Howard Assembly Room by Opera North, in April 2016. In September 2025 she played Heidi Schiller in the Irish premiere of Follies by Sondheim.

Garrett is a member of the board of the English National Opera and a vice president of Harrogate International Festivals.

In 2002, Garrett was appointed a CBE for her services to music. She was also awarded with a BASCA Gold Badge Award in October 2010, in recognition of her contribution to music.

=== Performances at sporting events ===
Garrett has performed at several FA Cup Finals, including the 2000 Final, the last to be held at the old Wembley Stadium, the 2007 final held at the new Wembley Stadium (alongside Sarah Brightman), and the 2008 Final (alongside Katherine Jenkins).

She also sang the British national anthem on the Champs-Élysées in Paris in 2012 after Bradley Wiggins became the first Briton to win the Tour de France, though her performance was not universally appreciated.

== Television and radio ==
In 2004, Garrett was one of the participants in the first series of the celebrity talent contest Strictly Come Dancing; she and her dance partner Anton du Beke finished third. In the same year she took part in the BBC's Who Do You Think You Are?, a genealogy documentary series, in which she journeyed through her home town of Thorne in search of her family history. She was delighted to discover that the musical gene stretched far back and had run in her family for several generations: her maternal grandfather made a living playing the piano with a small orchestra that accompanied silent films at cinemas in and around Sheffield. A great-grandfather was a travelling musician, working across northern England in the 19th century, playing to workers in pubs and clubs. During the First World War he entertained troops on the piano. Garrett is a veteran of Dictionary Corner on the Channel 4 game show Countdown, and in June 2005 it was thought that she was to become one of the show's rotating guest hosts while Richard Whiteley was recovering from illness. After Whiteley's death, however, the plan for rotating guest hosts was abandoned and Des Lynam took the role for the next fifteen months. Garrett did not appear on Countdown again until October 2009.

On Christmas Day 2004, BBC Two broadcast Lesley Garrett – Music from the Movies, co-starring her with Ruthie Henshall, Michael McCarthy with the backing of the Opera North orchestra. The programme was recorded at the Opera In The Park concert which had taken place in the grounds of Temple Newsam, West Yorkshire on 19 July 2003.

In February 2005, Garrett was selected to be one of the judges for BBC's Comic Relief does Fame Academy, and in May she hosted and sang at the 2005 Classical BRIT Awards at the Royal Albert Hall on ITV. She was a regular panellist on the ITV daytime show Loose Women during 2006; she featured there again in 2009 and 2010, before returning in May 2014. Garrett also appeared on This Morning and Loose Women in 2007, to perform a song from her latest album When I Fall in Love. She also continued the post as a judge on Comic Relief Does Fame Academy in 2007. She currently presents a show on the British classical radio station Classic FM.

From February 2008, Garrett presented the show Lesley Garrett's 20 Operas to See Before You Die on Sky Arts.

Over four weeks, beginning on 30 November 2008, she presented the Sunday morning BBC1 programme Christmas Voices.

In November 2010, she joined a long line of panellists on Five's The Wright Stuff.

Along with Larry Lamb, Garrett presented a short BBC series entitled When Royals Wed to celebrate the wedding of Prince William and Catherine Middleton in April 2011.

On 30 May 2014, she made her return to the ITV daytime show Loose Women. It was announced on the programme that she would become a regular panellist again.

She featured on the TV show My Life on a Plate on 10 September 2017; chef Brian Turner accompanied her on a trip to key locations from her childhood in Yorkshire, where she was taught by her parents to make the most out of what was available. The chef then created two dishes that wove nostalgia and the taste of home together.

== Personal life ==
Garrett married in May 1991: her husband, Dr Peter Christian, is a retired G.P. in Muswell Hill. They have a son, Jeremy, and a daughter, Chloe. The family home is in north London.

== Discography ==
As a recording artist, Garrett has released eleven solo albums. Many of them have been successful, receiving gold and silver status. Soprano in Red received the Gramophone Award for "Best-selling Classical Artist of the Year". Garrett was also a featured artist on the platinum selling "Perfect Day" single released by the BBC in aid of Children in Need.

Garrett created the role of Cathy in the London studio recording of Bernard J. Taylor's operatic version of Wuthering Heights, which also featured Dave Willetts, Bonnie Langford and other leading British musical theatre performers. Her rendition of "I Belong to the Earth" was included on two of her solo albums.

Other recordings include complete audio operas: Mozart's The Magic Flute (Papagena) conducted by Sir Charles Mackerras, Mozart's Così fan tutte (Despina), also conducted by Mackerras and Yum-Yum in the audio and video recordings of the Jonathan Miller production of The Mikado from ENO, in which she played the leading soprano role, Yum-Yum. She appears on two other DVDs of complete works from English National Opera, Handel's Ariodante (Dalinda) and Xerxes (Atalanta). In the video of the 1984 Glyndebourne L'incoronazione di Poppea under Raymond Leppard, she sings Nutrice and Valletto.

Garrett's only credit on a hit single was on a version of "Ave Maria", which she performed with leukaemia sufferer Amanda Thompson for the television programme Hearts of Gold, which reached no. 16 in the UK singles chart at the end of November 1993.

=== Solo albums ===
Studio

- Diva! A Soprano at the Movies (1991) AUS No. 74
- Prima Donna (1992)
- Simple Gifts (1994)
- The Lesley Garrett Album (1994) – UK No. 25
- Soprano in Red (1995) – No. 59
- Soprano in Hollywood (1996) – UK No. 53
- A Soprano Inspired (1997) – UK No. 48
- Lesley Garrett (1998) – UK No. 34
- I Will Wait For You (2000) – UK No. 28
- Travelling Light (2001) – UK No. 75
- The Singer (2002)
- So Deep is the Night (2003)
- When I Fall in Love (2007) – UK No. 11
- Amazing Grace (2008) – UK No. 50
- A North Country Lass (2012) – UK No. 66
- Centre Stage: The Musicals Album (2015)

==== Compilation albums ====
- The Soprano's Greatest Hits (1997) – UK No. 53
- The Best of Lesley Garrett (2004)

=== Solo DVDs ===
- Lesley Garrett (1998)
- I Will Wait For You (2000)
- Notes From The Heart (2003)
- Desert Dreams (2004)
- Lesley Garrett: Music from the Movies (2006)
- Lesley Garrett Live At Christmas (2008)

== Bibliography ==
- Notes From a Small Soprano – 2000
- Lesley Garrett: My Autobiography* – 2000
- Lesley Garrett Song Collection – 2001

* Reprint of Notes From a Small Soprano with few edits. Also the title of some copies of the audiobook.
