= Sylvie Brunet-Grupposo =

French opera singer

Sylvie Brunet, known as Sylvie Brunet-Grupposo, is a contemporary French opera singer (mezzo-soprano).

== Biography ==
Born to a Sicilian father and a French mother, Brunet was hired to sing the title role of Verdi's Aida in Bercy, one of her first professional engagements.

She moved towards the "Falcon" mezzo-soprano repertoire, a type of voice that is not very frequent. She has performed on several international stages and takes part in recordings, notably at Sony, Dynamic, and EMI.

Brunet performed Gluck's Iphigénie en Tauride at La Scala of Milan, under the baton of Riccardo Muti, Samson and Delilah at the Teatro Regio of Turin, the title-role of Carmen at the Zürich Opera House, the role of Suzuki in Madame Butterfly at the Paris Opera directed by Bob Wilson, Madame de Croissy in Dialogues des Carmélites at the Paris Opera and the Zürich Opera, Santuzza in Cavalleria Rusticana at the Séville Opera, Marguerite in La Damnation de Faust in Zürich and eventually the title role in Meyerbeer's l'Africaine at the Opéra national du Rhin.

Noticed by Sergio Segalini, she is invited to sing Azucena in Verdi's Il trovatore at the Martina Franca Festival. On this occasion, an Italian critic wrote of her: "Verdi has finally found her Azucena, Sylvie Brunet is currently one of the rare Verdian singers, as much for her dramatic potential as for the breadth of her voice".

Sylvie Brunet collaborates with the French conductor Marc Minkowski who invites her to sing the title role of Carmen in Paris and Grenoble as well as for productions of l’Incoronazione di Poppea at the Aix-en-Provence Festival and Vienna directed by Klaus Michael Gruber, and The Tales of Hoffmann at the Lausanne Opera.

Sylvie Brunet has sung in concert, among others Verdi's Requiem at Monte-Carlo under the direction of Georges Prêtre, Beethoven's Symphony No. 9 with the Orchestre National de France under the direction of Kurt Masur as well as the cantata Faust et Hélène by Lili Boulanger with the Orchestre philharmonique de Radio France and the Berliner Philharmonie.
