= Boulanger Initiative =

Organization supporting gender-marginalized composers

- Named after: Lili and Nadia Boulanger
- Formation: June 25, 2018 (8 years ago) (Note: According to social media posts from BI, their founding date is June 25, 2018. Some sources report this more generally as "June 2018", "early 2018", or "around 2018". BI was formally launched as a 501(c)(3) nonprofit organization in 2019; their first major event, WoCo Fest 2019, took place during the weekend of International Women’s Day (March 6–8).)
- Founders: Laura Colgate; Joy-Leilani Garbutt
- Purpose: To support women and gender-marginalized composers
- Headquarters: Takoma Park, Maryland, US
- Website: www.boulangerinitiative.org

Boulanger Initiative (BI) is an American music organization which supports women and gender-marginalized composers. BI's activities—including commissions, consulting, education, performance and research—aim to diversify the musical canon, particularly within Western classical music.

Founded by scholar-musicians Laura Colgate and Joy-Leilani Garbutt in June 2018, BI operates out of Takoma Park, Maryland as a 501(c)(3) nonprofit organization. Their projects include a database of composers and compositions; an annual music festival, WoCo Fest; repertoire consulting for orchestras; and new musicological class curriculums.

== Overview ==
Boulanger Initiative (BI) is a 501(c)(3) nonprofit organization based in Takoma Park, Maryland. BI seeks to support women and gender-marginalized composers, given their historic underrepresentation in music, and classical music in particular. (Note: BI defines gender-marginalized people as "non cis-male, including trans and/or non-binary".) Their mission statement includes the following:

"The Boulanger Initiative advocates for women and all gender marginalized composers. We foster inclusivity and representation to expand and enrich the collective understanding of what music is, has been, and can be."

— Boulanger Initiative Mission

The Boulanger Initiative was founded on June 25, 2018 by violinist Laura Colgate and organist Joy-Leilani Garbutt. At the time, both musicians were doctoral students with dissertations on women composers: Colgate authored Half of Humanity Has Something to Say, Also: Works for Violin by Women Composers (2018) at the University of Maryland, while organist Garbutt penned Les femmes invisibles: The Education, Careers, and Compositions of French Women Organists, 1872-1954 (2022) at Catholic University of America. (Note: See Colgate 2018 and Garbutt 2022a) Together, Colgate and Garbutt inaugurated the Boulanger Initiative, named for Lili and Nadia Boulanger.

BI takes a multifaceted approach, dividing activities into performance, education and commissions, and more recently, research and consulting. Musicologist Chanda VanderHart remarked that BI has "grown at remarkable and lightning speed". Among other virtual events, BI has hosted edit-a-thons to improve Wikipedia articles on gender-marginalized composers

== Projects ==
=== Boulanger Initiative Database ===
The Boulanger Initiative Database (BID) is an open access database for women and gender-marginalized composers and their compositions. (Note: In full, the BID's title is the "Women Composers and Gender-Marginalized Composers Repertoire Database".) According to The Violin Channel, the BID was published "following years of researching archives, compiling data, and beta testing." At the time of its launch on March 13, 2023, BID included more than 1,200 composers and 8,000 works. As of September 2025, this rose to more than 1,600 composers and 15,000 works, and as of March 2026 has expanded to 20,000 works and over 1,850 composers.

Each composer entry provides additional information, including public domain images, lifespan, notes such as pseudonyms or alternate spellings and links to external resources, including Wikipedia articles, relevant websites and their works in the database. According to VanderHart, the BID is primarily aimed at performers and has a particularly strong representation of American composers. She concludes that BID is "an important and ambitious step in a considerably more inclusive direction for classical repertories". Although the database is currently limited to deceased composers, BI intends to expand to living composers and their works in the future. Other future goals include the addition of difficulty labels, orchestral shorthand and various descriptive or thematic composition tags.

=== WoCo Fest ===
The Women Composers Festival (WoCo Fest) is an annual concert series that highlights music by women and gender-marginalized composers. Its first iteration took place in March 2019 and was held over International Women's Day weekend (March 6–8).

=== Redefining the Canon ===
BI began Redefining The Canon (RtC) in 2022, a program that aims to work with orchestras to diversify repertoire and audition materials. Partnering organizations include the African Diaspora Music Project, Dallas Symphony Orchestra, League of American Orchestras, National Philharmonic and the ROCO orchestra.

=== Course curriculums ===
Led by scholar-musician Caiti Beth McKinney, BI has released two musicology course curriculums with a women-centric perspective. First in 2024, a survey of Baroque women composers and later in 2025, a guide to orchestral music by women.

- McKinney, Caiti Beth; Maust, Paula; Roberts, Christine (2024). Beyond the Box, into the Barlines: Baroque-era Women Composers : A Curriculum Guide. Takoma Park: Boulanger Initiative. OCLC 1525541051.
- McKinney, Caiti Beth; Kolarik, Hannah; McMurtry, Noelle; Stroncek, Regina (2025). Beyond the Box, into the Barlines : Orchestral Women Composers Throughout History : A Curriculum Guide. Takoma Park: Boulanger Initiative. OCLC 1535227898.
