= L'incoronazione di Poppea discography =

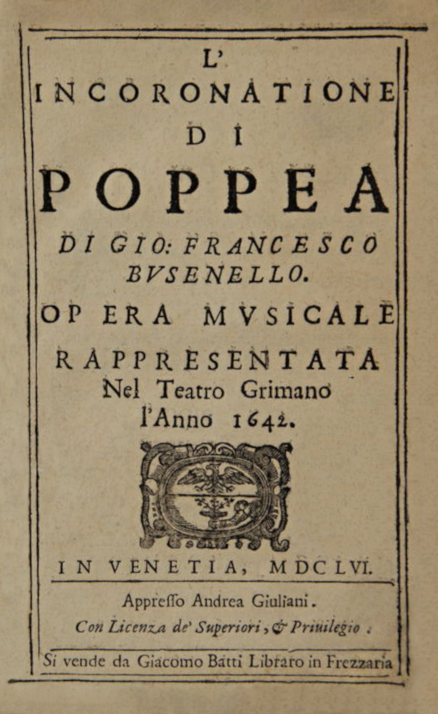
Title page of the libretto

These lists show the audio and visual recordings of L'incoronazione di Poppea by Claudio Monteverdi. The opera was premiered in Venice in 1642–43, but after a 1651 revival in Naples it remained unperformed for 250 years. It began to enter the general opera repertory in the 1960s, and thereafter was increasingly performed in leading opera houses and festivals.

== Summary of recording history ==
The first recording of L'incoronazione, with Walter Goehr conducting the Tonhalle-Orchester Zürich in a live stage performance, was issued in 1954. This LP version, which won a Grand Prix du Disque in 1954, is the only recording of the opera that predates the revival of the piece that began with the 1962 Glyndebourne Festival production. In 1963 Herbert von Karajan and the Vienna Staatsoper issued a version described by The Gramophone as "far from authentic", while the following year John Pritchard and the Royal Philharmonic Orchestra recorded an abridged version using Leppard's Glyndebourne orchestration. Leppard conducted a Sadler's Wells production, which was broadcast by the BBC and recorded on 27 November 1971. This is the only recording of the opera in English.

Nikolaus Harnoncourt's 1974 version, the first recording without cuts, used period instruments in an effort to achieve a more authentic sound, although Denis Arnold has criticised Harnoncourt's "over-ornamentation" of the score, particularly his use of oboe and trumpet flourishes. Arnold showed more enthusiasm for Alan Curtis's 1980 recording, live from La Fenice in Venice. Curtis uses a small band of strings, recorders and continuo, with trumpets reserved for the final coronation scene. Subsequent recordings have tended to follow the path of authenticity, with versions from baroque specialists including Richard Hickox and the City of London Baroque Sinfonia (1988), René Jacobs and Concerto Vocale (1990), and John Eliot Gardiner with the English Baroque Soloists.

In more recent years, videotape and DVD versions have proliferated. The first was in 1979, a version directed by Harnoncourt with the Zürich Opera and chorus. Leppard's second Glyndebourne production, that of 1984, was released in DVD form in 2004. Since then, productions directed by Jacobs, Christophe Rousset and Marc Minkowski have all been released on DVD, along with Emmanuelle Haïm's 2008 Glyndebourne production in which the Festival finally rejects Leppard's big-band version in favour of Haim's own small orchestra setting.

== List of recordings ==
The lists below refer to complete performances; excerpts and highlights are excluded. The year given is the year of the recording.

=== Audio ===
Year	Cast Poppea, Nerone, Ottavia, Ottone, Seneca	Conductor Opera house/Orchestra	Label
1952	Sylvia Gähwiller, Friedrich Bruckner-Rüggeberg, Maria Helbing, Mabelle Ott-Penetto, Franz Kelch	Walter Goehr; Tonhalle Orchestra, Zurich	LP: Concert Hall, Cat: CHS1184
1963	Sena Jurinac, Gerhard Stolze, Margarita Lilowa, Otto Wiener, Carlo Cava	Herbert von Karajan, Vienna Staatsoper	Audio CD: Deutsche Grammophon, Cat: 457 674–2
1963	Ursula Buckel, Hans-Ulrich Mlelsch, Eugenia Zareska, Grayston Burgess, Eduard Wollitz	Rudolf Ewerhart, Santini Chamber Orchestra	LP: Vox, Cat: OPBX113
1964	Magda László, Richard Lewis, Frances Bible, Walter Alberti, Carlo Cava	John Pritchard, Glyndebourne Chorus; Royal Philharmonic Orchestra	LP: His Master's Voice, Cat: SLS 908
1966	Claudia Parada, Mirto Picchi, Mirella Parutto, Renato Cesari, Boris Christoff	Carlo Franci, Maggio Musicale Fiorentino	CD: Opera d'oro, Cat: OPD1243
1966	Carol Bogard, Charles Bressler, Sharon Hayes, John Thomas, Herbert Beattie	Alan Curtis, Oakland Symphony Orchestra; University of California chorus	LP: Cambridge, Cat: CRM 8901
1971	Janet Baker, Robert Ferguson, Katherine Pring, Tom McDonnell, Clifford Grant	Raymond Leppard, Sadlers Wells Opera (Sung in English; BBC broadcast 21 November 1971	Oriel Music Society, Cat: OMS 046/3
1974	Helen Donath, Elisabeth Söderström, Cathy Berberian, Paul Esswood, Giancarlo Luccardi	Nikolaus Harnoncourt, Concentus Musicus Wien	Teldec; Cat: 2292–42547–2
1980	Carmen Balthrop, Carolyn Watkinson, Andrea Bierbaum, Henri Ledroit, Ulrik Cold	Alan Curtis; Il Complesso Barocco	LP: Aperta; Cat: LMA3008
1988	Daniela Dessì, Josella Ligi, Adelisa Tabiadon, Susanna Anselmi, Armando Caforio, Kumiko Yoshii	Alberto Zedda; Bassano Pro Arte Orchestra	LP & CD: Nuova Era; Cat: J6737/9
1988	Arleen Auger, Della Jones, Linda Hirst, James Bowman, Gregory Reinhart	Richard Hickox; City of London Baroque Sinfonia	Virgin Classics; Cat: 90775–2
1990	Danielle Borst, Guillemette Laurens, Jennifer Larmore, Axel Köhler, Michael Schopper	René Jacobs; Concerto Vocale	Harmonia Mundi; Cat: 901330/2
1996	Sylvia McNair, Dana Hanchard, Anne Sofie von Otter, Michael Chance, Francesco Ellero d'Artegna	John Eliot Gardiner, English Baroque Soloists	Archiv; Cat: 447 088–2
1997	Anna Caterina Antonacci, David Daniels, Nadja Michael, Axel Köhler, Kurt Moll	Ivor Bolton, Members of Bavarian State Orchestra	Farao Classics, Cat: B108 020
2000	Guillemette Laurens, Flavio Oliver, Gloria Banditelli, Fabian Schofrin, Ivan Garcia	Gabriel Garrido, Ensemble Elyma	K617, Cat: K617110
2005	Patrizia Biccirè, Liliana Rugiero, Angela Bucci; William Matteuzzi, Raffaele Costantini	Sergio Vartolo, Capella Musicale di San Petronio	Brillant, Cat: BLC 92752
2010	Emanuela Galli, Roberta Mameli, Xenia Meijer, José María Lo Monaco, Raffaele Costantini	Claudio Cavina, La Venexiana	Glossa, Cat: GCD 920916
2020	Oksana Maltseva, Shin Yoowon, Susanna Rigacci, Choi Seoyeon	Federico Bardazzi Ensemble San Felice	Bongiovanni Cat: GB 2581/82-2

=== Video ===
Year	Cast Poppea, Nerone, Ottavia, Ottone, Seneca	Conductor, Opera house/Orchestra	Label
1979	Rachel Yakar, Eric Tappy, Trudeliese Schmidt, Paul Esswood, Matti Salminen	Nikolaus Harnoncourt, Zurich Opera and Chorus; Stage director: Jean-Pierre Ponnelle	DVD: Deutsche Grammophon, Cat. No.0734174
1984	Maria Ewing, Dennis Bailey, Cynthia Clarey, Dale Duesing, Robert Lloyd	Raymond Leppard, London Philharmonic Orchestra and Glyndebourne Festival chorus Glyndebourne Festival, 1984; Director: Peter Hall	DVD: Kultur, Cat. No.PC47368
1993	Patricia Schumann, Richard Croft, Kathleen Kuhlmann, Jeffrey Gall, Harry Peters	René Jacobs, Concerto Köln; Schwetzingen Festival, 1993	DVD: Arthaus, Cat: 100 108
1994	Cynthia Hayman, Brigitte Balleys, Ning Liang, Michael Chance, Harry van der Kamp	Christophe Rousset, Les Talens Lyriques; Muziektheater Amsterdam; Director: Pierre Audi	DVD: Kultur, Cat:
2000	Mireille Delunsch, Anne Sofie von Otter, Sylvie Brunet, Charlotte Hellekant, Denis Sedov	Marc Minkowski, Les Musiciens du Louvre; Festival d'Aix en Provence, 2000	DVD: Bel Air, Cat:
2008	Danielle de Niese, Alice Coote, Tamara Mumford, Iestyn Davies, Paolo Battaglia	Emmanuelle Haïm, Orchestra of the Age of Enlightenment; Glyndebourne Festival, 2008; Stage direction: Robert Carsen	DVD: Decca, Cat: 0743339
2009	Miah Persson, Sarah Connolly, Maite Beaumont, Jordi Domènech, Franz-Josef Selig	Harry Bicket, Baroque Orchestra of the Gran Teatre del Liceu; Recorded live February 2009; Director: David Alden	Blu-ray: Opus Arte, Cat: BD7105
2010	Danielle de Niese, Philippe Jaroussky, Anna Bonitatibus, Max Emanuel Cencic, Antonio Abete	William Christie, Les Arts Florissants; Recorded live, May 2010, Teatro Real, Madrid; Director: Pier Luigi Pizzi	DVD: EMI/Virgin Classics
2010	Birgitte Christensen, Jacek Laszczkowski, Patricia Bardon, Tim Mead, Giovanni Battista Parodi	Alessandro De Marchi, Orchestra of the Norwegian National Opera; Stage director: Ole Anders Tandberg	Blu-ray: EuroArts; Cat: 205 8924
2012	Sonya Yoncheva, Max Emanuel Cenčić, Ann Hallenberg, Tim Mead, Paul Whelan	Emmanuelle Haïm, Le Concert d'Astrée; Recorded live, March 2012, Opéra de Lille; Stage director: Jean-François Sivadier	DVD: Virgin Classics; Cat: 928991-9
2017	Hana Blažíková, Kagnmin Justin Kim, Marianna Pizzolato, Carlo Vistoli, Gianluca Buratto	John Eliot Gardiner, English Baroque Soloists and Monteverdi Choir; Semi-staged, recorded June 2017, Teatro La Fenice	Blu-ray: Opus Arte
2018	Sonya Yoncheva, Kate Lindsey, Stéphanie d’Oustrac, Carlo Vistoli, Renato Dolcini	William Christie, Les Arts Florissants; Salzburg Festival, 2018; Stage director: Jan Lauwers	Streaming video: Carnegie Hall+ DVD/CD: Harmonia Mundi, Cat: HAF890262224
2020	Oksana Maltseva, Shin Yoowon, Susanna Rigacci, Choi Seoyeon	Federico Bardazzi	Bongiovanni
