= Amazing Grace (Lesley Garrett album) =

2008 album by Lesley Garrett

Studio album by Lesley Garrett
- Released: 28 November 2008
- Genre: Classical
- Length: 57:14
- Label: UCJ
- Producer: Tolga Kashif

Lesley Garrett chronology
| When I Fall in Love (2007) | Amazing Grace (2008) | A North Country Lass (2012) |

Amazing Grace is the fourteenth studio album by British soprano Lesley Garrett. It was released on 24 November 2008 by Universal Classics and Jazz. Amazing Grace was produced by Tolga Kashif, and features Christian hymns and religious Classical songs.

The album peaked at no. 50 on the UK Albums Chart, and no. 5 on the UK Classical Artist Albums Chart.

== Background and release ==
Amazing Grace was released in November 2008, shortly before Garrett starred in a West End production of Carousel from 2 December.

== Music ==
"Ave Verum" is a lyricised version of Geoffrey Burgon's theme music for the British TV series Brideshead Revisited.

== Track list ==
1. Amazing Grace
2. Ave Verum
3. Pour Annette
4. Hosanna
5. Laudate Dominum
6. Safe from Harm
7. A Gaelic Blessing
8. Domine Deus
9. Hymn
10. Ave Maria
11. Agnus Dei
12. Alleluia
13. The Day Thou Gavest
14. You'll Never Walk Alone

== Charts ==
Chart performance for Amazing Grace
| Chart (2008) | Peak position |
|---|---|
| Scottish Albums (OCC) | 58 |
| UK Albums (OCC) | 50 |
| UK Classical Artist Albums Chart (OCC) | 5 |
