= Frédéric Boulanger =

French cellist and composer (1777–1844)

Frédéric Boulanger (June 1777 – 2 April 1844) was a French cellist, composer and professor of singing at the Conservatoire de Paris.

== Biography ==
Boulanger was born in Dresden and later studied at the Conservatoire de Paris, where he won first prize in cello in 1797. There, he met his future wife, the mezzo-soprano Marie-Julie Halligner, later affiliated with the Théâtre de l'Opéra-Comique.

Later, he was appointed professor of cello at the institution, attached to the Chapelle royale.

The Boulangers had a son, Ernest, in 1815, who became a composer of comic operas and fathered musicians Nadia and Lili Boulanger (thus making Frédéric their grandfather). During Ernest's childhood, Frédéric deserted his family.

He died in Paris on 2 April 1844; he was 66.
