= L'ambassadrice =

Opera by Daniel Auber

L'ambassadrice is an opera or opéra comique in 3 acts by composer Daniel Auber. The work's French language libretto was written by Eugène Scribe and Jules-Henri Vernoy de Saint-Georges. The opera's world premiere was staged by the Opéra-Comique at the Théâtre des Nouveautés in Paris on 21 December 1836. It was revived in Paris on 4 January 2013 by the opera company Les Frivolités Parisiennes at the initiative of two research fellows who specialized in nineteenth-century historically informed performance, Pierre Girod (vocal coach) and Charlotte Loriot (stage director).

== Roles ==
Role	Voice type	Premiere Cast, 21 December 1836 (Conductor:)	Revival Cast (Conductor: Mathieu Romano)
Duke of Valberg	tenor	Théodore-Étienne-François Moreau-Sainti	Christophe Crapez
Countess Augusta of Fierschemberg	soprano	Monsel	Dorothée Thivet
Fortunatus	bass	Roy	Guillaume Paire
Madame Barneck	mezzo-soprano	Marie-Julie Halligner	Laure Ilef
Henriette	soprano	Laure Cinti-Damoreau	Magali Léger
Charlotte	soprano	Jenny Colon	Estelle Lefort
Benedict	tenor	Joseph-Antoine-Charles Couderc	Jean-François Novelli
