= Lili Boulanger =

French composer (1893–1918)

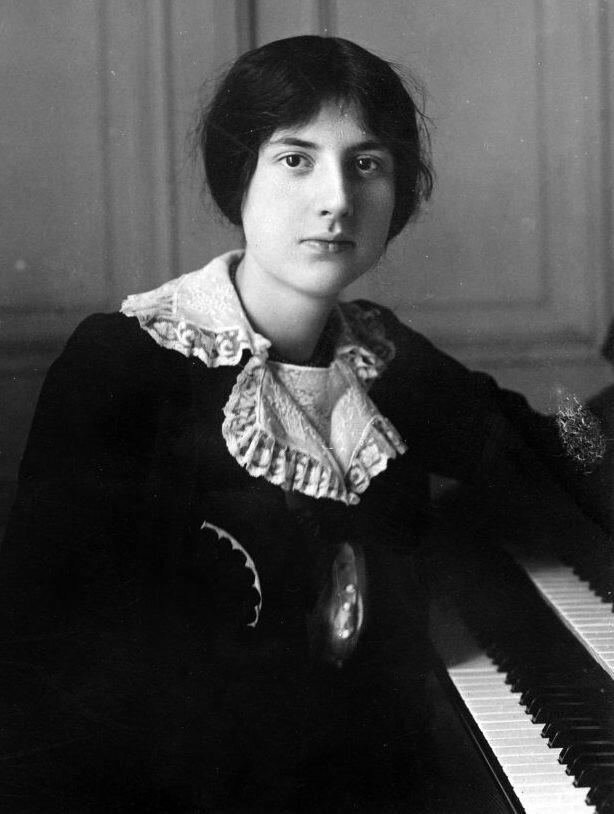
- Boulanger in 1913
- Born: Marie-Juliette Olga Boulanger; 21 August 1893; Paris, France
- Died: 15 March 1918 (aged 24); Mézy-sur-Seine, Yvelines, France
- Education: Conservatoire de Paris
- Occupations: Composer; musician
- Years active: 1910–1918
- Organization: Franco-American Committee of the Conservatoire
- Notable work: Faust et Hélène; D'un matin de printemps
- Style: Symbolism, Impressionism
- Father: Ernest Boulanger
- Relatives: Nadia Boulanger (elder sister); Marie-Julie Halligner (paternal grandmother); Frédérick Lemaître (paternal granduncle); Frédéric Boulanger (paternal grandfather)

Marie-Juliette Olga Boulanger (French: [maʁi ʒyljɛt bulɑ̃ʒe]; 21 August 1893 – 15 March 1918), professionally known as Lili Boulanger (French: [lili bulɑ̃ʒe]), was a French composer and musician, associated with the Symbolist and Impressionist movements. The first woman to win the Grand Prix de Rome composition competition, her older sister was the composer and composition teacher Nadia Boulanger; their father was the composer Ernest Boulanger.

Critics and scholars have praised her output for its harmonic language, formal control, and emotional depth, despite the brevity of her career. Her notable works include her three psalms for chorus and orchestra, the song-cycle Clairières dans le ciel (to poems by Francis Jammes), the D'un soir triste and D'un matin de printemps diptych, the Vieille prière bouddhique, Pie Jesu, her Prix de Rome cantata Faust et Hélène and various others.

Boulanger died in 1918 at the age of 24, after years of chronic illness.

== Biography ==
=== Early life and education ===
Marie-Juliette Olga Boulanger was born on 21 August 1893 to a middle-class musical family in the ninth arrondissement of Paris.

Her mother was Raïssa Ivanovna Myshetskaya (Mischetzky; 1858–1935), a Russian princess from Saint Petersburg who descended from Michael of Chernigov. In 1877, Myshetskaya married her vocal teacher at the Conservatoire de Paris, Ernest Boulanger (they had first met in her hometown), who won the Prix de Rome in 1835. By the time of Lili’s birth, he was aged 77; she was very attached to her father. Her paternal grandfather Frédéric Boulanger was a noted cellist (although he deserted his family); her grandmother and eponym, Marie-Julie Halligner, was a famous mezzo-soprano, and all of the Boulanger children were christened in honour of her. Ernest and Raïssa Boulanger had four children: the eldest, Ernestine Mina-Juliette Boulanger, died in childhood; after her, in 1887, was born Juliette Nadia Boulanger, followed by Marie-Juliette in 1893, and Léa Marie Louise in 1898, who passed later that year. Marie-Juliette was named in honor of her paternal grandmother (as were all the Boulanger children), but she always went by Lili, a diminutive of Juliette.

According to biographer Léonie Rosenstiel, Ernest Boulanger asked the six-year-old Nadia to promise that she would look after her younger sister. Nadia and her parents enthusiastically encouraged Boulanger's musical education. Her musical aptitude was evident in early childhood: at age two, she could sing melodies by ear.

Boulanger was a sickly child. Aged two, she was affected with bronchial pneumonia which would last until the age of sixteen. This severely weakened her immune system and spurred her chronic illness.

In 1900, Ernest Boulanger died in Brussels. His family were profoundly affected by his death; this loss would later partially dictate the tone of much of his younger daughter's work.

She often accompanied her ten-year-old sister Nadia to classes at the Conservatoire, soon auditing courses on music theory and studying organ with Louis Vierne. She also sang and played piano, violin, cello, and harp. Her teachers included Marcel Tournier and Alphonse Hasselmans for harp, Hélène Chaumont (mother of Madeleine Chaumont) for piano, and Fernand Luquin for violin. Recurrent illness interrupted her formal studies between the ages of six and 16. After much waiting, Boulanger studied harmony with Georges Caussade and composition with Paul Vidal.

=== Prix de Rome and professional career ===
Inspired by Nadia's pursuit of the Prix de Rome and their father's 1835 victory, Boulanger entered the competition in 1912. However, during a performance of her cantata Maïa, she collapsed from illness. She would return the following year aged nineteen, composing the cantata Faust et Hélène to a libretto by Eugène Adenis, based on Goethe's Faust (though its text has been criticised). She became the first woman to win first prize. Faust et Hélène was performed various times during her lifetime. During her residency at the Villa Medici, she accepted a contract with the music publisher Ricordi, who published her prizewinning cantata.

Although proud of her sister, Nadia forsook her aspirations for the Prix de Rome following four unsuccessful attempts (although she had won second prize in 1908). The elder Boulanger instead focused on her role as assistant in Henri Dallier's organ class at the Conservatoire. Gabriel Fauré, the institution's director, was impressed by Lili's talent, frequently bringing her songs for her to read. Academics who revised her compositions noted their colourful harmony, instrumentation and skilful text-setting.

According to Caroline Potter, "The two sisters were both influenced by Debussy, and it appears they had similar literary tastes to the elder composer. Both sisters set poems by Maurice Maeterlinck, who was the author of the play Pelléas and Mélisande and also of Princesse Maleine; in February 1916, Maeterlinck authorised Lili to set the latter play as an opera. Allegedly, Lili had almost completed the opera before her death, though only the short score of act 1, scene 2, two versions of the libretto, and a sketchbook have survived."

=== The Gazette des classes de composition du Conservatoire ===
In 1915, Lili and Nadia Boulanger founded the Franco-American Committee of the Conservatoire to keep Paris Conservatoire students and alumni serving in World War I in contact through letters and care packages. It began as a small exchange of letters between Lili and her closest colleagues but quickly grew into a regular gazette. With Nadia, she founded and served as secretary of the Gazette des classes de composition du Conservatoire under the patronage of Whitney Warren. The gazette began as a 'circular letter', enquiring with certain conservatoire musicians to regularly write into the committee to be sent back out as a newsletter. The first received 51 responses in October 1915 and was published as its first issue the following month. They included all members (even those who failed to respond) in alphabetical order with their letters listed; it was illustrated by Jacques Debat-Ponsan. The gazette ended in 1918, shortly after Boulanger's death. During its lifetime, it received over 1,600 letters from 316 students and graduates, issuing twelve issues in total. These were only recently published by the Bibliothèque nationale de France, the final never being made public.

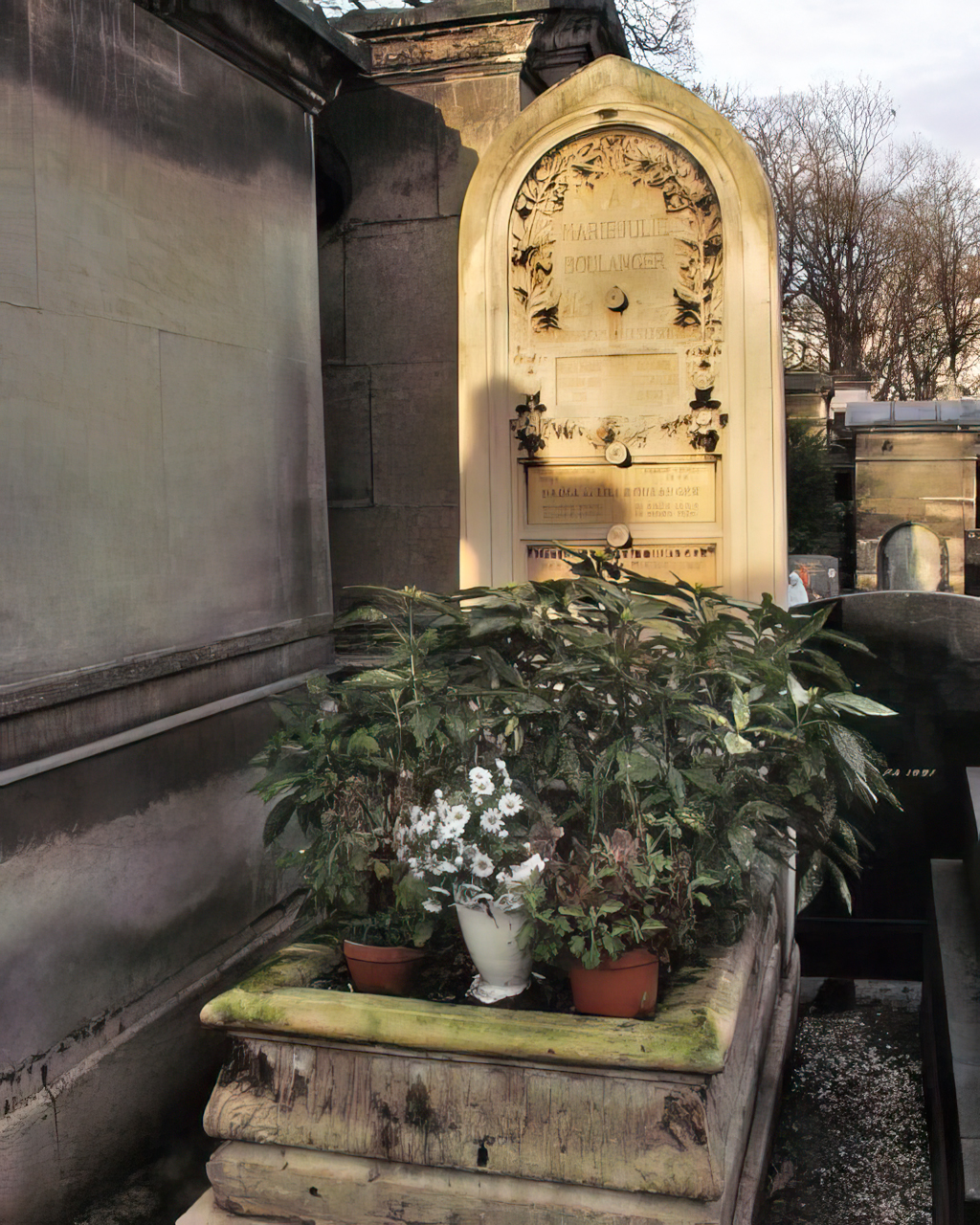
Tomb of the Boulanger family; Montmartre Cemetery, Paris

=== Last days: illness and death ===
Despite her interest in travel, declining health required her to return to France. There, she and her sister organised efforts to support French soldiers during World War I. Her last years were musically productive as she laboured to complete as many pieces as she could. However, she failed to finish the opera La princesse Maleine, which she began developing in February 1916.

Her recurrent maladies, which began with her childhood pneumonia infection, culminated in intestinal tuberculosis. Some later writers have speculated that her symptoms are consistent with Crohn's disease, which was not described as a distinct condition during her lifetime. She died at the age of 24 in Mézy-sur-Seine on 15 March 1918.

Following her Requiem mass, Boulanger was buried at the Montmartre Cemetery in Paris. Nadia would live until 1979 and was later buried within the same grave; the sisters lie next to their parents.

== Music ==
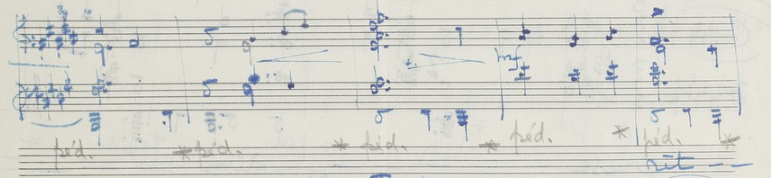
From the holograph of D'un jardin clair

Raised in a time of musical transition, Boulanger's music fits into what would soon be defined as neo-Romanticism. Like Debussy, she more keenly associated herself with Symbolism over Impressionism, with her music featuring the former's sense of obscurity and indirection. However, she also 'explored the Impressionists' palette of nonfunctional seventh and ninth chords, parallel chords, and modal progressions'. While much of her music reflects the feelings of solitude and alienation that began to emerge during the twentieth century, they also reveal her struggles with depression and loneliness caused by her long-term illness.

Aspects of Fauré and Claude Debussy can be heard in her compositions; later composers, such Arthur Honegger, were influenced by her innovations.

Within her vocal work, Boulanger often set poetry conveying senses of despondence and melancholy. Notably, the finale (Demain fera un an) of her song cycle Clairières dans le ciel (whose texts were written by Francis Jammes), includes these lines: "Nothing more. I have nothing more, nothing to sustain me [...] I seem to feel a weeping within me, a heavy, silent sobbing, someone who is not there."

Inspired by her devout Catholicism, Boulanger composed three psalm settings: Psalms 24, 129 and 130, and often referenced religious themes within her work.

=== Notable work, style and innovations ===
==== Les sirènes ====
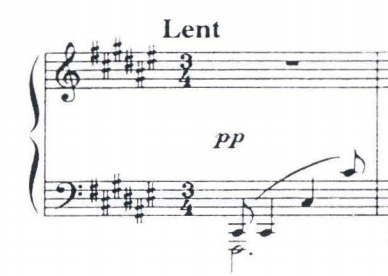
Incipit of Les sirènes, demonstrating its ostinato

Les Sirènes (Lili Boulanger), for solo soprano and three-part choir with piano or orchestral (unpublished) accompaniment, was written in 1911. It sets a poem by Charles Grandmougin and is dedicated to Jane Bathori.

It premièred at one of her mother's musical salons. Auguste Mangeot, a critic from the Paris music journal Le monde musical, reported that it was so well-received that it was encored. A practice piece for the Prix de Rome, it exhibits the firm grounding in academic technique taught at the Conservatoire de Paris.

Grandmougin's poem deals with sirens, mythological creatures that sing to seduce sailors to steer closer; when they do, the sirens devour them. From the introduction through twenty-eight measures, a pedal tone on F♯ combined with ascending C♯ octaves evoke their hypnosis.

==== Psalm 24 ====
Psalm 24 is subtitled La terre appartient à l'Eternel ('The earth doth belong to the Eternal'); it was composed in 1916, while Boulanger was resident in Rome. Dedicated to Jules Griset, director of the Choral Guillot de Saint-Brice, The psalm is scored for four-part chorus accompanied by organ, four horns, three trumpets, four trombones, tuba, timpani and two harps.

It employs brass fanfares and homophonic choral passages; its variance of sections contrasts with the style of Faust et Hélène.

The psalm was published by Éditions Durand in 1924.

==== Psalm 129 ====
Psalm 129 was also written in Rome in 1916. Of greater length than Psalm 24, it is scored for full orchestra and chorus.

It premièred at the Salle Pleyel in 1921, conducted by Henri Büsser.

==== Psalm 130 ====
Du fond de l'abîme (Psalm 130: De Profundis / "Out of the depths"), composed for chorus and large orchestra (including a sarrusophone), is dedicated to the memory of her father Ernest. Although Boulanger wrote the piece at the age of twenty-two, critics revere it for its developed and well-formed style.

Scholars have suggested that the work was also composed in reaction to World War I.

==== Pie Jesu ====
Pie Jesu was scored for high voice, string quartet, harp and organ. It was written at the very end of her life, though "the first of Lili Boulanger's sketches for the Pie Jesu are to be found in a composition book she used between 1909 and 1913". Because of her failing health, Boulanger dictated the work to her sister Nadia. Biographers Léonie Rosenstiel and Olivia Mattis speculate that Boulanger intended to write a complete Requiem but did not live to complete it.

==== Vieille prière bouddhique ====
This work, 'Old Buddhist Prayer', is written for tenor and chorus (soprano, alto, tenor and bass). They are accompanied by a large orchestra of 2 flutes, 2 oboes, English horn, two clarinets in B♭, bass clarinet in B♭, two bassoons, sarrusophone and four horns in F, three trumpets, four trombones, tuba, tympani, cymbals, bass drum, celesta, two harps and strings. Composed from 1914 to 1917, it only premièred in 1921, following World War I (like many of her works).

Vieille prière bouddhique is not rooted within a Catholic framework; rather, it sets the text of a daily prayer from the Metta Sutta.

James Briscoe notes that this work shows similarities to Igor Stravinsky's music, while also anticipating the next generation of composers.

==== D'un... diptych ====
===== D'un soir triste =====
D'un soir triste (Of a sad evening) is a symphonic poem, the last work Boulanger wrote in her own hand without assistance. It is the first of a diptych, with D'un matin de printemps thenceforwards following.

===== D'un matin de printemps =====
Like its preceding piece, D'un matin de printemps (Of a spring morning) is one of her last completed compositions. Different arrangements were produced: for violin and piano; for flute and piano; for piano trio; and finally, an arrangement for orchestra. However, Nadia Boulanger edited these to add dynamics and performance directions.

=== List by year ===
Title	Year	Instrumentation	Text by
Sous bois	1911	Choir (SATB) and piano	Philippe Gille
Nocturne	1911	Violin and piano	N/A
Renouveau	1911	Vocal quartet (SATT) and piano/orchestra	Armand Silvestre
Les sirènes	1911	Soprano, chorus and piano	Charles Grandmougin
Reflets	1911	Voice and piano	Maurice Maeterlinck
Prélude	1911	Piano; in D-flat major	N/A
Attente	1912	Voice and piano/orchestra	Maurice Maeterlinck
Hymne au Soleil	1912	Contralto, chorus and piano	Casimir Delavigne
Le Retour	1912	Voice and piano	Georges Delaquys
Pour les funérailles d'un soldat	1912	Baritone, chorus and piano	Alfred de Musset
Soir sur la plaine	1913	Soprano, tenor and orchestra	Albert Samain
Faust et Hélène	1913	Mezzo-soprano, tenor, baritone, chorus and orchestra	Eugène Adenis
Thème et variations	1914	Piano	N/A
D'un jardin clair	1914	Piano	N/A
D'un vieux jardin	1914	Piano	N/A
Cortège	1914	Violin and piano	N/A
Clairières dans le ciel	1914	Voice and piano	Francis Jammes
Psaume 24	1916	Chorus, organ and orchestra	David
Psaume 129	1916	Baritone and orchestra	Anonymous: Biblical Psalm
Dans l'immense tristesse	1916	Voice and piano	Bertha Galeron de Calonne
Psaume 130	1917	Two solo voices, chorus, organ and orchestra	David
Vieille prière bouddhique	1917	Tenor, chorus and orchestra	Anonymous: extract from the Metta Sutta
D'un matin de printemps	1918	Violin and piano	N/A
Pie Jesu	1918	Voice, string quartet, harp and organ	Anonymous: Tridentine Missal
D'un soir triste	1918	Orchestra	N/A

== Legacy ==
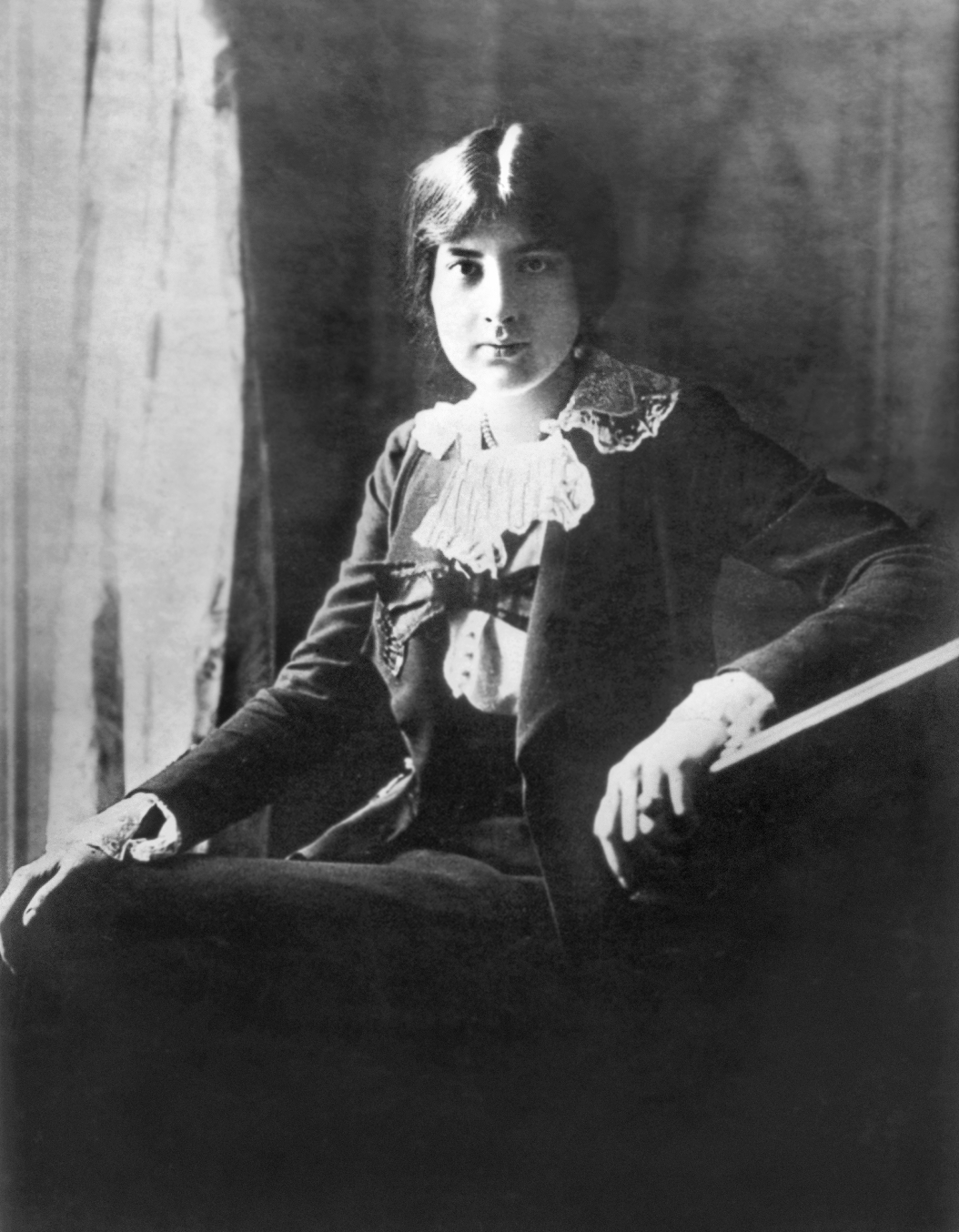
Boulanger in 1913, promotional photograph after winning the Prix de Rome

In March 1939, Nadia Boulanger created the Lili Boulanger Memorial Fund, administered through the University of Massachusetts Boston. The fund has two stated objectives: to preserve Boulanger's music and memory, and to provide financial support to emerging composers. It does not accept applications for its annual competition, but a list of candidates is produced by a group of nominators selected each year by the Board of Trustees. Each nominator proposes a candidate for the prize. The fund then awards the Prix Lili Boulanger to one of these candidates. Previous winners have included Alexei Haieff (1942), Noël Lee (1953), Wojciech Kilar (1960), Robert D. Levin (1966, 1971) and Andy Akiho (2015).

In April 1965, the Friends of Lili Boulanger Association was created in Paris; this organisation became the Nadia and Lili Boulanger International Centre (Centre international Nadia et Lili Boulanger, CNLB) in 2009.

Joy-Leilani Garbutt and Laura Colgate, two musicians from Washington, D.C. founded the Boulanger Initiative in 2018 to support music composed by women, in honour of the sisters.

The asteroid 1181 Lilith was named in honour of Boulanger.
