= Lélia Gousseau =

French classical pianist (1909–1997)

Lélia Gousseau (11 February 1909 – 14 February 1997) was a 20th-century French classical pianist.

== Biography ==
Born in Paris, the daughter of pianist Fanny d'Almeida (disciple of Elie Delaborde) and organist William Gousseau (1870-1939), maître de chapelle at Saint-Nicolas-du-Chardonnet (1893-1938), Gousseau entered at a young age in the Conservatoire de Paris where she won a first prize in piano in the class of Lazare-Lévy (1925) - who regarded her as one of her best disciples along with her contemporary Monique Haas - as well as a first prize in Music History in Maurice Emmanuel's class (1926)

Récipient of the Claire Pagès Prize (1928), laureate of the III International Chopin Piano Competition of Warsaw (1937), Gousseau also received the Albert Roussel Prize (1939), a composer of whom she was the privileged performer (even today, her recordings of the Concerto, the Suite Op. 14, the three Pieces Op. 49 etc. are authoritative).

Soloist with major national and international ensembles (debut with the orchestras of Boston, New York and Philadelphia in 1952), Gousseau particularly distinguished herself in the French music of her time: Chausson, Dukas, Ohana, Schmitt, creating, in particular, the Passacaille by Marcel Mihalovici (Op. 105) and the étude Pour les sonorités de la main gauche by Henri Martelli, two pieces of which she was the dedicatee - although she played and recorded Brahms, Chopin, Schumann and Falla.

Lélia Gousseau taught at the Conservatoire de Paris (1961-1978) as well as at the École Normale de Musique de Paris, where her teaching was distinguished above all by an extreme attention paid to fingering, pedalling, deep playing and legato. Anne Queffélec, Émile Naoumoff, Jean-Pierre Ferey, Maria Tortelier-de la Pau, Alain Raës, Pascal Devoyon and Kaoki Kimura were among her numerous pupils.

She toured South Africa in 1954 and 1957.

Gousseau died in Paris at age 88.

== Selected recordings ==
Camille Saint-Saëns, piano concerto n°4, Lélia Gousseau, piano,Orchestre National de la RTF, conducted by André Cluytens (Live 11/12/1956). CD INA 2014
