= Fiorella (opera) =

1826 opera by Daniel Auber

Fiorella is an opera in three acts by composer Daniel-François-Esprit Auber and librettist Eugène Scribe. The opera is based on the novel Les trois Gil-Blas: ou, Cinq ans de folie by Jean-Henri-Ferdinand Lamartelière. Fiorella premiered at the Opéra-Comique on 28 November 1826. It remained in the repertory of that theatre for the next 22 years during which time the opera was performed 118 times. The original cast was led by soprano Félicité Pradher in the title role. Other cast members included tenors Jean-François Lafeuillade as Rodolphe and Louis-Auguste Lemonnier as Albert, and mezzo-soprano Marie-Julienne Boulanger as Zerbine.

== Plot ==
Set in Rome during the Napoleonic era, the opera is based around a love triangle in which two friends, Rodolphe, a French officer, and Albert, a Neapolitan gentleman, vie for the affections of the maiden Fiorella. Fiorella is inconsistent in her affections. Rodolphe is acting as a French spy, and gets into trouble. Fiorella secretly trys to assist him using her maid, Zerbine, and the ex-bandit, Pietro, as messengers. While traveling in the countryside to escape the Roman authorities, Rodolphe and Albert are beset by a thunderstorm. They take shelter at a monastery. While there, Rodolphe vows to Albert that he will never marry Fiorella. Fiorella arrives at the monastery in disguise, and reunites with Rodolphe in a romantic scene witnessed by Albert who reproaches his friend. The police arrive to arrest Rodolphe, but mistakenly take Albert instead. Zerbine accidentally burns papers that would have convicted Rodolphe. Eventually all ends well with Fiorella and Rodolphe happily paired off, and Albert consoled by Zerbine.
