= Franz Kelch =

German bass-baritone

- Born: 1 November 1915; Bayreuth, Kingdom of Bavaria, German Empire
- Died: 5 June 2013 (aged 97); Munich, Germany
- Occupation: Singer

Franz Kelch (1 November 1915 – 5 June 2013) was a German bass-baritone lied and oratorio singer. His discography includes works of Johann Sebastian Bach, Dieterich Buxtehude, George Frideric Handel, and Claudio Monteverdi.

== Biography ==
Franz Kelch was born in Bayreuth. He started voice training in difficult times in 1937 with Henriette Klink in Nürnberg after mandatory military service. He had to interrupt his studies with the outbreak of World War II. After he returned from a prisoner-of-war-camp, he started teaching and singing for the Bayerischer Rundfunk (Bavarian broadcast) in programs of early music and new works of Munich composers such as Joseph Haas, Hermann Zilcher or Wolfgang Jacobi.

In 1948, Franz Kelch was the soloist for A German Requiem of Brahms with the Münchner Philharmoniker, then Bach's Mass in B minor with the Heinrich-Schütz-Kreis conducted by Michael Schneider, and Beethoven's 9th Symphony with the Bamberger Symphoniker and Joseph Keilberth. When in 1951 Karl Richter took over the Heinrich-Schütz-Kreis (that became the Münchener Bach-Chor in 1954), they entered a collaboration until 1957 with performances of all major works of Bach, especially the Vox Christi, the words of Jesus, in Bach's passions. K.H. Ruppel, the chief critic of the Süddeutsche Zeitung, wrote about the St Matthew Passion in 1956: "Die Gestaltung der Christus-Partie durch Franz Kelch gehört in der geistigen Durchdringung, der Wärme des Ausdrucks und der kultivierten Führung der edlen Baßstimme zum Schönsten, was man sich an sängerischer Bachinterpretation denken kann."

Thomaskantor Günther Ramin engaged him for two tours of Western Europe and for the Archiv Produktion recording of the Johannes-Passion with the Thomanerchor. He was a bass soloist for recordings by Fritz Werner and the Heinrich-Schütz-Chor Heilbronn of the Bach Passions, the Mass in B minor and many cantatas for Erato. He sang the role of Seneca in the first recording of Monteverdi's opera L'incoronazione di Poppea in 1952 with Walter Goehr and the Tonhalle-Orchester Zürich, released and awarded a Grand Prix du Disque in 1954 and the Canti guerrieri et amorosi, 8th Book of Madrigals by Claudio Monteverdi under Marcel Couraud in 1955.

In addition to his extensive concert activities as a lieder and oratorio singer in Germany and Western Europe, Franz Kelch taught from 1953-1978 at the Leopold-Mozart-Konservatorium Augsburg (now the Leopold Mozart Center). Numerous well-known opera and concert singer emerged from his 25 years of voice teaching.

Franz Kelch lived in Munich from 1947. He died on 5 June 2013. He is survived by ten children.
