= Marie-Julie Halligner =

French mezzo-soprano (1786–1850)

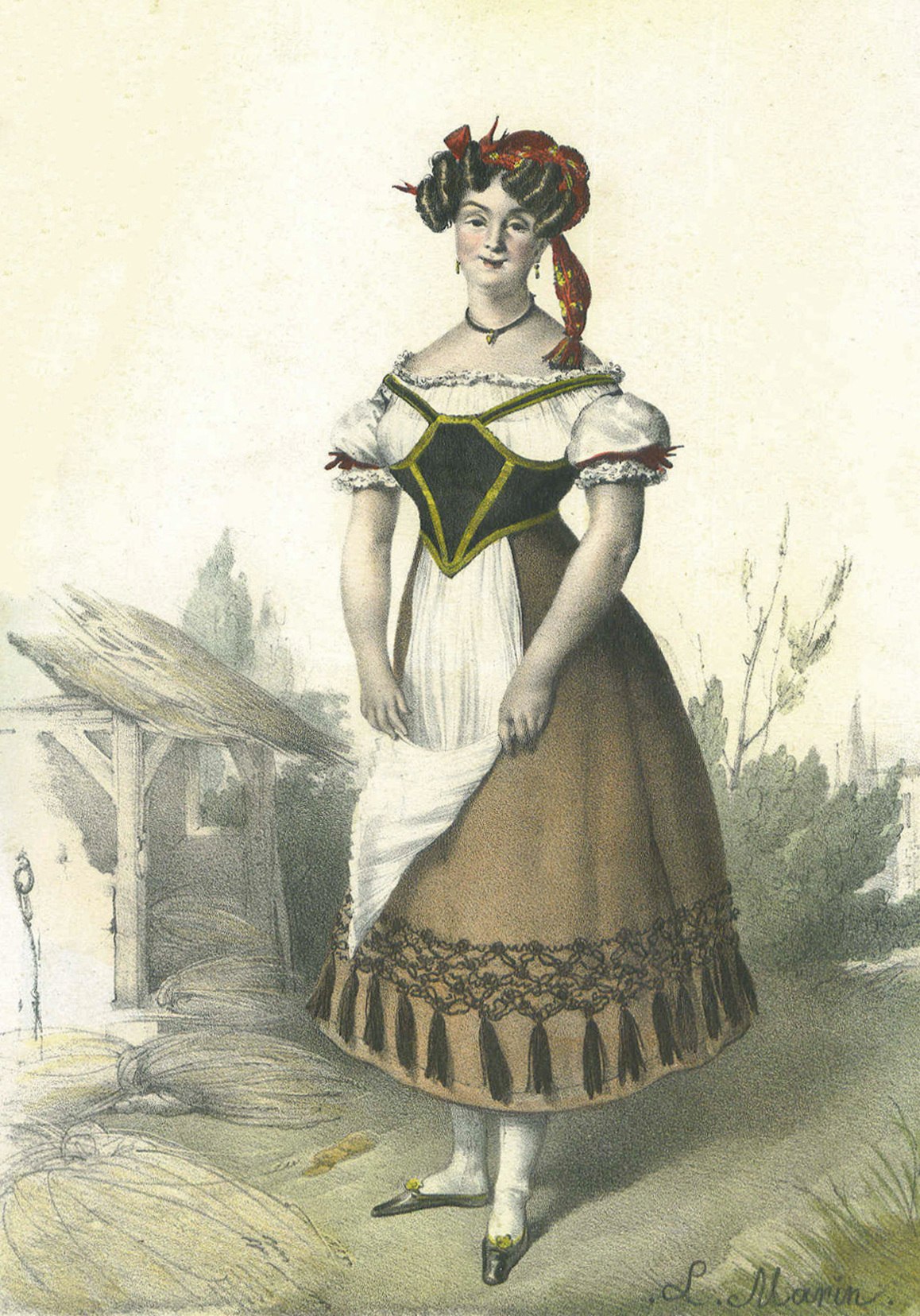
Lithograph of Halligner by Louis Stanislas Marin-Lavigne

Marie-Julie Boulanger (née Hallinger; 29 January 1786 – 23 July 1850) was a French mezzo-soprano. She performed her entire career under the stage name Mme Boulanger, appearing in the world premieres of Le maître de chapelle, L'ambassadrice, Le domino noir, and La fille du régiment.

== Biography ==
Born in Paris to middle-class shopkeepers, she was elder sister to Sophie Halligner, an actress at the Odéon-Théâtre de l'Europe and the Théâtre de l'Ambigu-Comique who married the actor Frédérick Lemaître in 1826. Halligner entered the Paris Conservatory in 1806 to study solfeggio; she was a pupil of Charles-Henri Plantade and Pierre-Jean Garat.

Halligner's debut at the Opéra-Comique in 1811 was considered "an immense success". A notable soubrette at the Opéra-Comique between 1811 and 1835, she continued performing until 1845, though her voice had started to fail her in the later years. She performed in the world premieres of numerous opéras comiques, including Zerbine in Fiorella (1826), Lady Pamela in Auber's Fra Diavolo in 1830 and Ritta in Hérold's Zampa in 1831. She played the role of Gertrude in Le maître de chapelle, by Ferdinando Paer, 1821; Madame Barneck in L'ambassadrice, by Daniel Auber, 1836; and the Marquise of Berkenfield in La fille du régiment by Gaetano Donizetti, 1840. Her other performances included the works of André Grétry, Nicolas Isouard, François-Adrien Boieldieu. Her voice was reportedly "fine, her execution brilliant and her acting full of character and intelligence". Following her retirement in 1845, she concentrated on teaching activities in Paris.

Halligner was the wife of cellist and professor of the Paris Conservatory, Frédéric Boulanger, whom she had met during her studies there. Her son, Ernest Boulanger, winner of the Grand Prix de Rome in 1835, was a composer of comic operas; her daughter-in-law, Princess Raissa Mychetsky, descended from Michael of Chernigov. Her granddaughters, composers Nadia Boulanger and Lili Boulanger, also competed in the Prix de Rome, Nadia earning second place in 1908 and Lili winning first prize in 1913.
