= Amanda Thompson (pianist) =

Pianist

- Born: 10 July 1980 (age 45); Keighley, West Yorkshire, England
- Genres: Classical music
- Occupation: Pianist
- Years active: 1994–95
- Labels: Internal Affairs, EMI

Amanda Thompson is a pianist and cancer survivor, who had a top 20 hit single in 1993 with opera singer Lesley Garrett.

== Music career ==
Thompson joined Chetham's School of Music when she was 11, earning a place through her talent for piano. In January 1993, she was diagnosed with leukaemia, and raised money for cancer charities by playing her keyboard in shopping centres. The Esther Rantzen television programme Hearts of Gold found out about Thompson, and invited her to a television studio, where she performed "Ave Maria" with opera singer Lesley Garrett CBE; Thompson was under the impression that this was a rehearsal for Garrett, but the recording was turned into a CD single.

The single was duly released in October, with proceeds going to the Malcolm Sargent Cancer Fund for Children, and became a hit. It entered the UK singles charts at no. 48 in November 1993, a shortage of stockists being blamed for it not entering higher. It peaked at no. 16 at the end of the month. The duo performed the track on the 18 November 1993 edition of Top Of The Pops. It was the only hit single for Thompson and Garrett.

Thompson recorded an album, Amanda Thompson & Friends, with the Royal Philharmonic Orchestra, and one track recorded in Miami with Dudley Moore. Proceeds again went to charity, and the album was released on 11 July 1994, the day after her 14th birthday; there was one single released from it, a version of Amazing Grace also featuring Willard White.

== Treatment ==
In the next couple of years, Thompson underwent a pioneering treatment - bone marrow autograph - which resulted in an improvement in her health in time for her to take her A-levels. She went to Huddersfield University to read for a degree in chemistry.
