= Travelling Light (Lesley Garrett album) =

Studio album by Lesley Garrett
- Released: 2001
- Recorded: 2000–2001
- Studio: Air Studios and Whitfield Street Studios, London
- Genre: Operatic pop, Classical crossover
- Label: BBC/EMI

Lesley Garrett chronology
I Will Wait For You (2000)	Travelling Light (2001)	The Singer (2002)

Travelling Light is a 2001 by British soprano singer Lesley Garrett. It reached 75 on the UK general album chart. In the US it was released in February 2002.

Among original music it includes the song "Two Hearts, One Love" specially composed for Lesley Garrett by George Martin with lyrics by Don Black, a medley of two songs by the Beatles: "For No One" and "Blackbird".

== Track listing ==
1. Medley of "Surrender" and "The Wonder of You" (5:04)
2. "Ave Maria" with Julian Leang (4:13)
3. "Bess, You Is My Woman Now" with Bryn Terfel (5:04)
4. Medley of "For No One" and "Blackbird" (4:36)
5. "I Dreamed a Dream" (4:32)
6. "Mambo Italiano" with Evelyn Glennie (4:21)
7. "The Summer Knows" (4:48)
8. "Two Hearts, One Love" (3:39)
9. "Alabama Song" (2:44)
10. "La Violet" with Roland Chadwick (4:09)
11. "Et Si Demain" with Michel Legrand (3:27)
12. "Over the Rainbow" (5:00)
13. "A Boy Like That" (4:47)
14. "On Holy Ground" (5:39)
