= Bertha Galeron de Calonne =

French poet

Bertha Galeron de Calonne (15 June 1859 – 1936) was a French poet born in Paris in the old 12th arrondissement. She died in Dangu sometime in 1936.

== Biography ==
Calonne was the great-granddaughter of Charles Alexandre de Calonne, who was the finance minister of Louis XVI. She started losing her ability to see or hear following a bout of typhoid fever in 1870, and her sense of hearing continued to deteriorate until the end of her life, fixing her forever to a world of silence. The sisters of Saint-Vincent de Paul who took her into their fold as a boarder provided her with special education for deaf youth, and they began to teach her the mysteries of music. Within her dark and deafened world, poetry and music became the twin sources of her solace.

She eventually married an architect, one "Galeron", a member of l'École des beaux-arts. With him she had four children, two of whom died in infancy. She accompanied Galeron to the courts of Romania, Spain, and Portugal. She was a great friend of Carmen Sylva (literary pseduonym of Elisabeth of Wied, the first Queen of Romania), whom she engaged in extensive correspondence. She was also a friend of Amélie of Orléans and of Pierre Loti, with whom she sojourned at Hendaye.

After the death of her husband, she retired to Dangu, a small village in the department of Eure, where she would live out her remaining years in her holiday home. She died and was buried there in 1936.

== Works ==
- Chez la Champmeslé, a comedy in verse, with Ernest de Calonne, Paris, Odéon-Théâtre de l'Europe, 21 December 1886.
- Dans ma nuit, poems, with a preface by Carmen Sylva, 1890. Reissued in 1897; 1925 (with a preface by Charles le Goffic); and 1996, with a foreword by Émile Ducharlet.
- Ambroise Paré, a drama in verse, performed at the Maguerra Theater in 1899.
- Mémoires (unfinished), fragment published in the Revue hebdomadaire of 20 August 1918.
