= Émile Naoumoff =

Bulgarian pianist and composer (born 1962)

Émile Naoumoff (Bulgarian: Емил Наумов; born 20 February 1962 in Sofia, Bulgaria) is a Bulgarian pianist and composer. He revealed himself a musical prodigy at age five, taking up study of the piano and adding composition to his studies a year later. At the age of eight, after a fateful meeting in Paris, he became the last disciple of Nadia Boulanger, who referred to him as "the gift of my old age". He studied with her until her death in late 1979. Boulanger gave him the opportunity to work with Clifford Curzon, Igor Markevitch, Robert and Gaby Casadesus, Nikita Magaloff, Jean Françaix, Leonard Bernstein, Soulima Stravinsky, Aram Khachaturian, Sviatoslav Richter and Yehudi Menuhin. Lord Menuhin conducted the premiere of Naoumoff's first Piano Concerto, with the composer as soloist when he was ten years old. He pursued studies at the Paris Conservatory with Lélia Gousseau, Pierre Sancan, Geneviève Joy-Dutilleux, as well as at the Ecole Normale de Musique de Paris with Pierre Dervaux (conducting).

In 1981, at age 19, he was signed as a composer with the music publisher Schott, Mainz. He was the youngest on their roster.

Upon the death of Mlle. Boulanger, Naoumoff took over her classes at the summer sessions of the Conservatoire d'Art Americain in Fontainebleau. Later, in 1984, he was appointed at the Conservatoire National Supérieur de Musique, Paris.

Naoumoff's reputation as a piano virtuoso dates from 1984 when he substituted without notice for a stricken pianist in a performance of Tchaikovsky's Piano Concerto No. 1 in Monte Carlo. He is regularly invited by the world's premier orchestras: the Los Angeles Philharmonic Orchestra, the Berlin Symphony, the Vienna Symphony, the San Francisco Symphony, National Symphony in Washington, Moscow Symphony, NHK Symphony, the Residentie Orkest of the Hague, Orchestre Philharmonique de Radio-France, Camerata Bern, and has collaborated closely with renowned conductors such as Leonard Bernstein, Igor Markevitch, Leonard Slatkin, Mstislav Rostropovich, Eliahu Inbal and others. He also earned a personal invitation from Rudolf Serkin to perform at the Marlboro Festival and has given recitals throughout Europe, the US and Asia. Naoumoff was invited to the Evian Festival, presided by Mstislav Rostropovich, with whom he performed.

His own piano concerto version of Moussorgsky's Pictures at an Exhibition was premiered with the National Symphony Orchestra at the Kennedy Center in Washington D.C. under the baton of Mstislav Rostropovich. He has received numerous awards, including the Médaille d'honneur de Paris, an honour bestowed upon him by Jacques Chirac, and the Prix de Composition de l'académie des Beaux Arts.

In 1995 he served on the jury of the Paloma O'Shea Santander International Piano Competition in Spain. In 1996, he opened his own summer academy at the Chateau de Rangiport in Gargenville, France in the spirit of Nadia Boulanger. Since 1998, he has been a professor at Indiana University Jacobs School of Music, where he teaches applied piano and graduate-level seminars on keyboard interpretation.
