= Amanda Purvis =

American archer (born 1990)

Amanda Thompson
Personal information
- Born: January 12, 1990 (age 36) Kennewick, Washington, United States

Amanda Thompson (born January 12, 1990, Kennewick, Washington) is an American recurve archer from the United States. Her maiden name is Purvis and her former married named was Linde-Kaminski.

Born in Kennewick, Washington, she was coached by Terry Laney. In 2004, she qualified for a position on the Junior US World Team and competed in the Junior World Archery Championships in Lilleshall, England. In 2006, she was selected for USA Archery's Junior Dream Team. In 2006, she won a position on the Junior US World Team and competed in the Junior World Archery Championships in Merida, Mexico. In 2008, she was selected to be a Resident Athlete at the United States Olympic Training Center in Chula Vista, California.

In 2011, she married US Olympic archer Jake Kaminski and they later divorced in 2015.

Amanda is currently the Chief of Student Maid, owned by Kristen Hadeed and located in Gainesville, Florida. She currently lives in Portland, Oregon and works remotely. She married Cody Thompson in 2018.

Amanda has 5 sisters and 2 brothers. Her mother is Susan Sexton and her father is Wes Reinhardt.

Her and her husband live a vegan lifestyle.
