= Ernest Boulanger (composer) =

French composer and conductor (1815–1900)

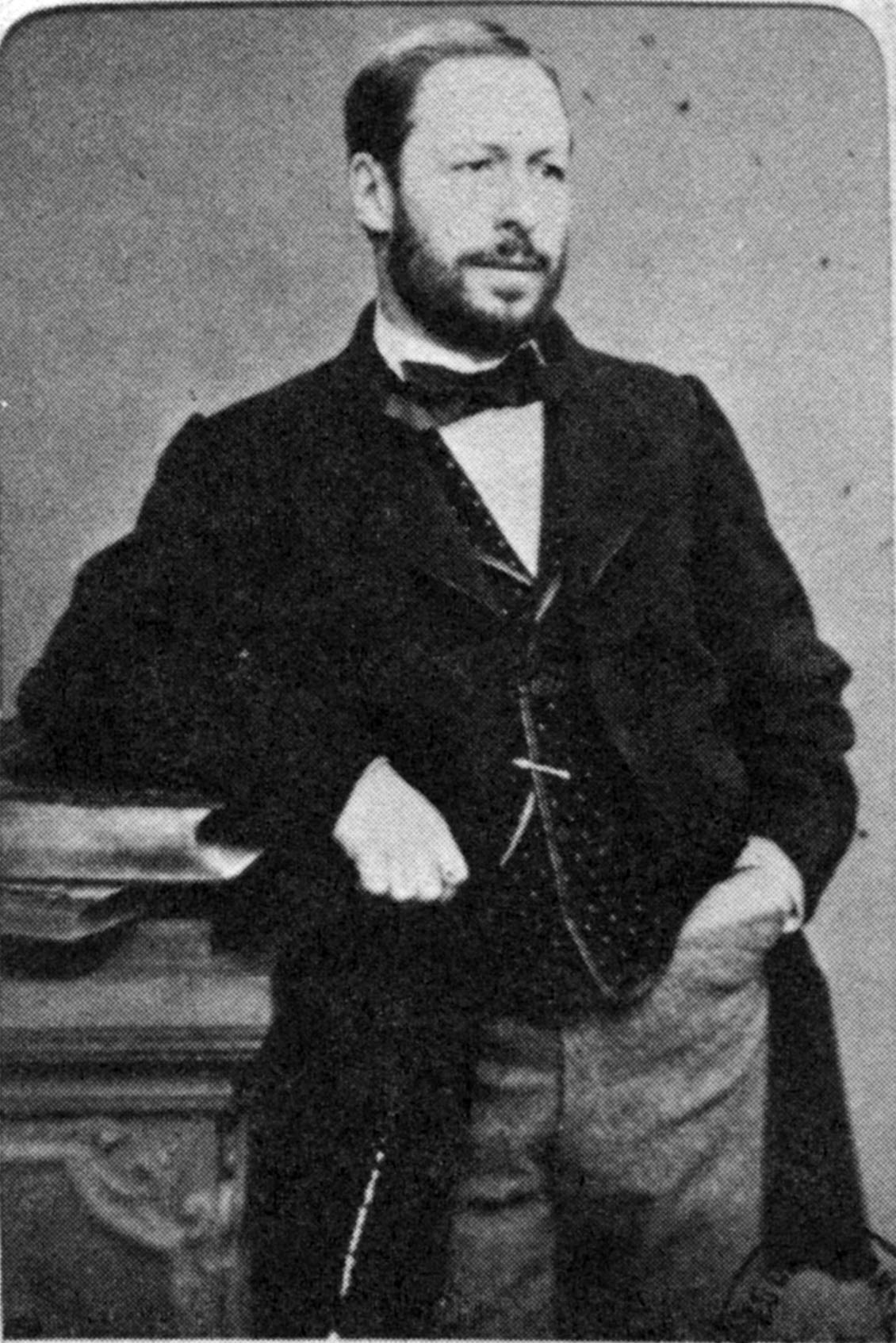
Boulanger, c. 1872

Ernest Henri Alexandre Boulanger (16 September 1815 – 14 April 1900) was a French composer and conductor. He was known for being a composer of choral music and comic operas, a choral group director, a voice teacher, and also judged at voice contests.

== Biography ==
Boulanger was born into a Parisian musical family. His father Frédéric, who left the family when Ernest was only a small child, was a cellist and professor of voice at the Paris Conservatory, winner of the First Prize in cello at the Conservatory in 1797 and a professor of cello, attached to the King's Chapel. His mother, Marie-Julie Halligner, was a mezzo-soprano at the Théâtre de l'Opéra-Comique in Paris. He was a pupil at the Paris Conservatory where he studied under Jean-François Le Sueur, and Fromental Halévy. He studied piano with the virtuoso pianist Charles-Valentin Alkan; and operatic composition with Daniel Auber and Ferdinand Hérold.

At the age of 19, Boulanger was awarded the Grand Prix de Rome in 1835 with his cantata "Achille". In 1842, he began making a name as a composer of comic operas and as a conductor. Boulanger composed a dozen comic operas between 1842 and 1877. His chief work was the three-act opera Don Quixote, which premiered at the Théâtre Lyrique in 1869; the most performed of his works was the one-act Les Sabots de la marquise ("The Marquise's Clogs"), which premiered in 1854 at the Opéra-Comique. In 1870, he was made a Chevalier of the Legion of Honor. In 1871, he became professor of singing at the conservatory. In 1881, he was appointed to the Académie des Beaux-Arts. Within the cultural circles of Paris, Boulanger was an associate of Charles Gounod, Jules Massenet, Camille Saint-Saëns and William Bouwens.

Boulanger met his wife Raissa Mychetsky (née Mychetskaya; 1856–1935), 41 years his junior, in Saint Petersburg. She was a Russian princess who descended from St. Mikhail Chernigovsky, and Boulanger was her voice teacher. They married in 1877 and moved to Paris where they had two children, the teacher and composer Nadia Boulanger; and composer Lili Boulanger. Like their father, Nadia and Lili both competed in the Prix de Rome, Nadia taking second place in 1908, and Lili earning the first place in 1913.

== Principal works ==
- Le Moulin (1840, libretto by Eugène de Planard)
- Le Diable à l'École (libretto by Eugène Scribe) (1842)
- Les Deux Bergères (1843)
- Une voix (1845, libretto by Alfred Bayard and Charles Potron)
- La Cachette (1847)
- Le 15 août aux champs (1852, libretto by Michel Carré)
- Les Sabots de la Marquise (1854, libretto by Michel Carré and Jules Barbier)
- L'Éventail (1860, libretto by Michel Carré and Jules Barbier)
- Don Quichotte (1869, libretto by Michel Carré and Jules Barbier)
- Don Mucarade (1875, libretto by Michel Carré and Jules Barbier)
