= Susanna Rigacci =

Swedish-born Italian singer (born 1960)

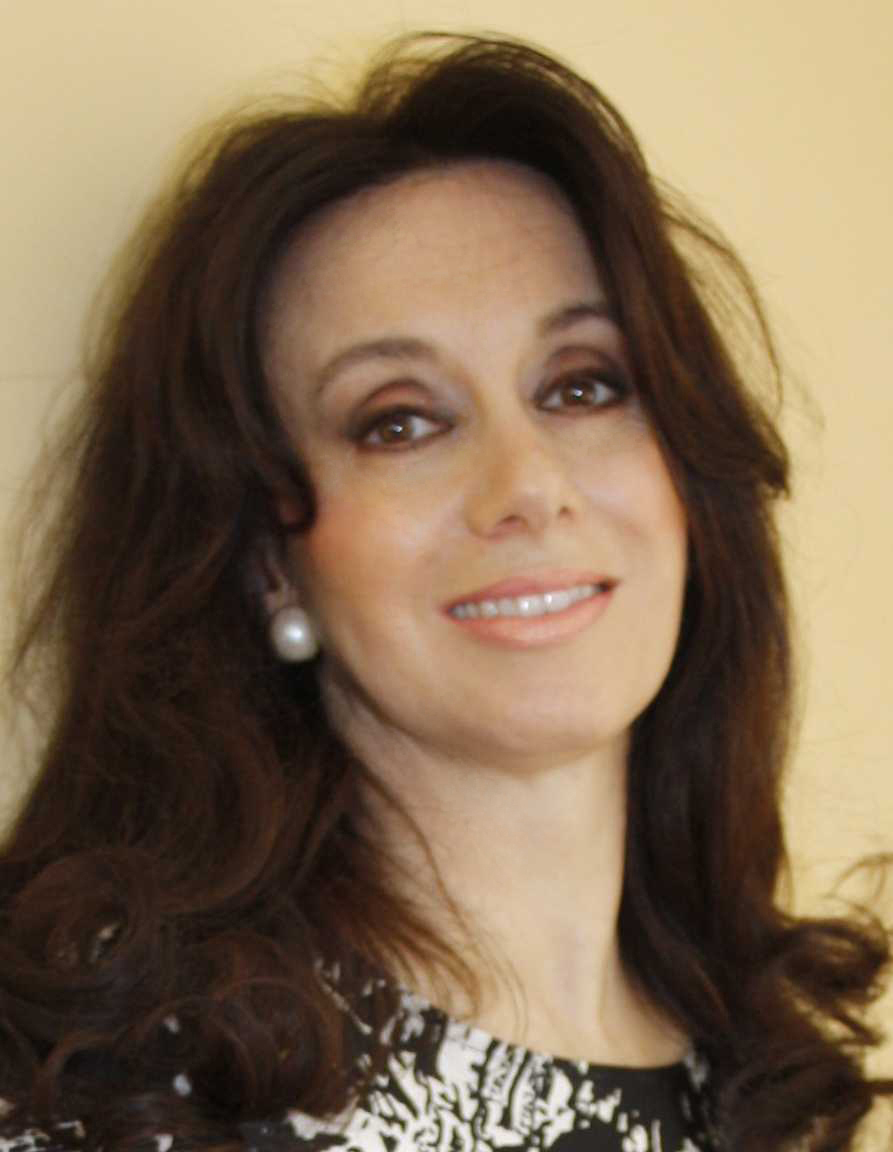

Background information
- Born: May 16, 1960 (age 65); Stockholm, Sweden
- Genres: Classical, operatic
- Occupation: Singer
- Instrument: Soprano
- Labels: Euroarts, Bongiovanni, Arts Music
- Website: www.susannarigacci.it

Susanna Rigacci (born May 16, 1960) is a Swedish-born Italian soprano.

== Early life ==
Susanna Rigacci was born in 1960 in Stockholm, Sweden, the daughter of composer and conductor M.° Bruno Rigacci. She is a graduate of the Florence Conservatory and attended successfully a post graduate experience with Iris Adami Corradetti. Under her guidance, Susanna was awarded at the International "Maria Callas" Competition (Concorso RAI, 1983), and for the "Sängerförderungspreis", at the Mozarteum (Salzburg, 1985).

== Career ==
Rigacci made her professional opera debut at the Teatro dell'Opera di Roma as Rosina in The Barber of Seville; a role which she is particularly associated with. In Italy, she has performed in the most prestigious theaters such as: La Scala in Milan, Maggio Musicale Fiorentino, La Fenice in Venice, the Teatro Filarmonico in Verona, the Teatro Massimo in Palermo, the Teatro Regio in Parma, the Teatro Massimo Bellini in Catania, and the Teatro Comunale di Bologna.

She has also performed at the Carnegie Hall in New York, Opéra Comique and Théatre Châtelet in Paris, Prague Philharmonic, the Royal Albert Hall and the Queen Elizabeth Hall in London, Opéra de Wallonie in Liège, Sibelius Academy in Helsinki, Fundaçao Gulbenkian in Lisbon, Wexford Festival, Teatro Municipale in Mallorca, and Staatteater in Bern.

Her lyrical Soprano repertoire revolves mostly around the Italian Baroque (Vivaldi, Scarlatti, Cimarosa, Baldassare Galuppi, Pergolesi, Boccherini, Stradella, Gasparini, Sacchini), from whom she has made several recordings with the Solisti Veneti, conducted by Claudio Scimone (Erato) for the Philips and Bongiovanni labels. Her Rossini and Donizetti repertoire includes Don Pasquale – screened for German broadcast, L'elisir d'amore, La figlia del reggimento, Il signor Bruschino, Il Barbiere di Siviglia, La cambiale di matrimonio.

Rigacci is also versed in contemporary music performing at the most prestigious institutions and events like: Venice Biennale; the London Sinfonietta; the RAI in Rome, Turin and Milan; the Pomeriggi Musicali Orchestra in Milan; the Sicilian Symphonic Orchestra; and Di Ghibellina Festival. She has interpreted Webern, Berg, Schönberg, Berio, Nono, Sciarrino and Casavola, and she has performed some Togni, Pennisi, D'Amico compositions for the first time to an audience. She has also been the main performer on the Italian opening performance of La gatta inglese (The English Cat) by Henze at the Teatro Comunale di Bologna.

Susanna Rigacci alternates her concert performance with chamber music repertory and since 2001 has been a frequent performer with Ennio Morricone on his concert tours throughout Europe and overseas.

In February 2011, she participated in the Sanremo Festival as lead vocalist in the song "I Confess" by Mauro Ermanno Giovanardi, along with the artist La Crus, earning accolades from critics and audiences.

In September 2013, the Omega Festival, Florence, dedicated an evening with Susanna Rigacci at one of the most important halls in Florence, the Limonaia di Villa Strozzi. At the piano was her brother, M.° Pietro Rigacci; the pieces of music played were by Haendel, Vivaldi, Rossini, Donizetti, Puccini and others. A group of ISTITUTO EUROPEO's students participated at the concert, which was a big success.

=== Teaching ===
In addition to her public profile Susanna Rigacci is also an accredited Professor of Vocal Technique. She combines her concert activities with teaching master classes at the AEF, Accademia Europea Di Firenze and has also taught at the Scuola Musicale in Fiesole, near Florence, Italy. She is sought after by many students for her specialization classes internationally, teaching to a great number of foreign students in 5 languages (Swedish, Italian, English, French and German).

== Awards and accolades ==
- 1983 - awarded for her performance at the International "Maria Callas" Competition (Concorso RAI).
- 1985 - first prize "Sängerförderungspreis", at the Mozarteum in Salzburg.
- 2008 - awarded the "International G. Verdi Award" in recognition of her outstanding career.

== Media ==
=== Partial discography ===
Year	Title	Composer
2000	Aspern Suite	Salvatore Sciarrino
2000	Boccherini: Gioas Re di Giuda	Luigi Boccherini
2004	Cantate Da Camera A Voce e B.C.	Francesco Gasparini

=== DVD ===
Year	Title	Role	Production Details
1985	Don Pasquale	Norina	collaboration between RAI Radiotelevisione Italiana and Bibo TV Germany
2004	Ennio Morricone, Arena Concerto	Soprano	concert performance from the Arena in Verona, Italy. Ennio Morricone conducting, with the Roma Sinfonietta Orchestra.
2007	Ennio Morricone, Peace Notes: Live in Venice	Soprano	concert performance at the Piazza San Marco, Venice. Ennio Morricone conducting, with the Roma Sinfonietta Orchestra.

== Sources ==
- http://iemusicafirenze.blogspot.com.au/2013/09/take-lessons-at-istituto-europeo-with.html
- http://www.arena.it/en-US/PersonnelDetailen.html?idpersonnel=10588
- https://aefirenze.it/en/about-the-school/teachers/82-insegnanti-musica-en/197-susanna-rigacci-en.html
