= Nadia Boulanger =

French musician and teacher (1887–1979)

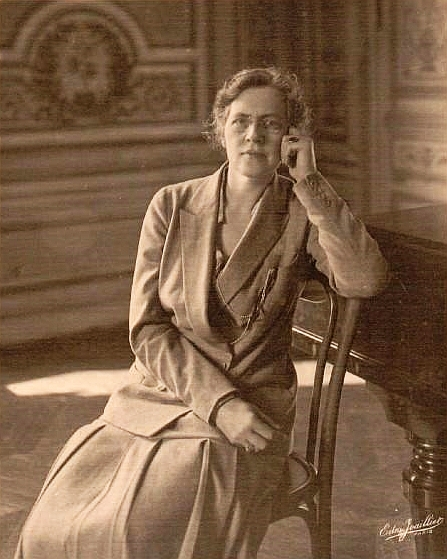
- Boulanger in 1925
- Born: Juliette Nadia Boulanger; 16 September 1887; Paris, France
- Died: 22 October 1979 (aged 92); Paris, France
- Occupations: Music teacher; conductor; composer
- Father: Ernest Boulanger
- Relatives: Lili Boulanger (younger sister); Marie-Julie Halligner (paternal grandmother); Frédéric Boulanger (paternal grandfather)

Juliette Nadia Boulanger (French: [ʒyljɛt nadja bulɑ̃ʒe]; 16 September 1887 – 22 October 1979) was a French music teacher, conductor and composer. She taught many of the leading composers and musicians of the twentieth century, and also performed occasionally as a pianist and organist.

Born into a musical family (her father Ernest and sister Lili were acclaimed composers), Boulanger entered the Conservatoire de Paris at an early age but, believing that she lacked particular compositional talent, she forsook writing music and became a teacher. In that capacity, she influenced generations of young composers, especially those from the United States and other English-speaking countries. Among her students were many important composers, soloists, arrangers, and conductors, including Grażyna Bacewicz, Daniel Barenboim, İdil Biret, Elliott Carter, Aaron Copland, David Diamond, John Eliot Gardiner, Philip Glass, Roy Harris, Quincy Jones, Dinu Lipatti, Igor Markevitch, Astor Piazzolla, Julia Perry, George Walker, and over 250 others.

She taught in the United States and the United Kingdom, working with music academies including the Juilliard School, the Yehudi Menuhin School, the Longy School, the Royal College of Music and the Royal Academy of Music, but her principal base for most of her life was her family flat in Paris. There, she taught for most of the seven decades from the start of her career until her death at the age of 92.

Boulanger was the first woman to conduct many major orchestras in America and Europe, including the BBC Symphony, Boston Symphony, Hallé, and Philadelphia orchestras. She conducted several world premieres, including works by Copland and Stravinsky.

== Biography ==
=== Early life and education ===
Juliette Nadia Boulanger was born in Paris on 16 September 1887, to French composer and pianist Ernest Boulanger (1815–1900) and his wife Raissa Myshetskaya (1856–1935), a Russian princess, who descended from St. Mikhail Tchernigovsky.

Ernest Boulanger had studied at the Paris Conservatoire and, in 1835 at the age of 20, won the coveted Prix de Rome for composition. He wrote comic operas and incidental music for plays but was most widely known for his choral music. He achieved distinction as a director of choral groups, teacher of voice, and a member of choral competition juries. After years of rejection, in 1872 he was appointed to the Paris Conservatoire as professor of singing.

Raissa qualified as a home tutor (or governess) in 1873. According to Ernest, he and Raissa met in Russia in 1873, and she followed him back to Paris. She joined his voice class at the Conservatoire in 1876, and they were married in Russia in 1877. Ernest and Raissa had a daughter, Ernestine Mina Juliette, who died as an infant before Nadia was born on her father's 72nd birthday.

Through her early years, although both parents were very active musically, Nadia would get upset by hearing music and hide until it stopped. In 1892, when Nadia was five, Raissa became pregnant again. During the pregnancy, Nadia's response to music changed drastically. "One day I heard a fire bell. Instead of crying out and hiding, I rushed to the piano and tried to reproduce the sounds. My parents were amazed." After this, Boulanger paid great attention to the singing lessons her father gave, and she began to study the rudiments of music.

Her sister, named Marie-Juliette but known as Lili Boulanger, was born in 1893, when Nadia was six. When Ernest brought Nadia home from their friends' house and before she was allowed to see her mother or Lili, he made her promise solemnly to be responsible for the new baby's welfare. He urged her to take part in her sister's care.

From the age of seven, Nadia studied in preparation for her Conservatoire entrance exams, sitting in on classes and having private lessons with the teachers. Lili often stayed in the room for these lessons, sitting quietly and listening.

In 1896 the nine-year-old Nadia entered the Conservatoire. She studied there with Fauré and others. She came in third in the 1897 solfège competition and subsequently worked to win first prize in 1898. She took private lessons from Louis Vierne and Alexandre Guilmant. During this period, she also received religious instruction to become an observant Catholic, taking her First Communion on 4 May 1899. The Catholic religion remained important to her for the rest of her life.

In 1900 her father Ernest died, and money became a problem for the family. Raissa had an extravagant lifestyle, and the royalties she received from performances of Ernest's music were insufficient to live on permanently. Nadia continued to work hard at the Conservatoire to become a teacher and be able to contribute to supporting her family.

In 1903 Nadia won the Conservatoire's first prize in harmony. She continued to study for years, although she had begun to earn money through organ and piano performances. She studied composition with Gabriel Fauré and, in the 1904 competitions, she came in first in three categories: organ, accompagnement au piano, and fugue (composition). At her accompagnement exam, Boulanger met the renowned French pianist, organist, and composer, Raoul Pugno, who subsequently took an interest in her career.

In the autumn of 1904, Nadia began to teach from the family apartment at 36 rue Ballu. In addition to the private lessons she held there, Boulanger started holding a Wednesday afternoon group class in analysis and sight singing. She continued these almost until her death. This class was followed by her famous "at homes", salons where students could mingle with professional musicians and Boulanger's other friends from the arts, such as Igor Stravinsky, Paul Valéry, Fauré, and others.

=== Professional life ===
After leaving the Conservatoire in 1904 and before her sister's untimely death in 1918, Boulanger was a keen composer, encouraged by both Pugno and Fauré. Caroline Potter, writing in The New Grove Dictionary of Music and Musicians, says of Boulanger's music: "Her musical language is often highly chromatic (though always tonally based), and Debussy's influence is apparent." Her goal was to win the First Grand Prix de Rome as her father had done, and she worked tirelessly towards it in addition to her increasing teaching and performing commitments. She first submitted work for judging in 1906, but failed to make it past the first round. In 1907, she progressed to the final round but again did not win.

In late 1907, she was appointed to teach elementary piano and accompagnement au piano at the newly created Conservatoire Femina-Musica. She was also appointed as assistant to Henri Dallier, the professor of harmony at the Conservatoire.

In the 1908 Prix de Rome competition, Boulanger caused a stir by submitting an instrumental fugue rather than the required vocal fugue. The subject was taken up by the national and international newspapers, and was resolved only when the French Minister of Public Information decreed that Boulanger's work be judged on its musical merit alone. She won the Second Grand Prix for her cantata, La Sirène.

In 1908, as well as performing piano duets in public concerts, Boulanger and Pugno collaborated on composing a song cycle, Les Heures claires, which was well-received enough to encourage them to continue working together. Still hoping for a Grand Prix de Rome, Boulanger entered the 1909 competition but failed to win a place in the final round. Later that year, her sister Lili, then sixteen, announced to the family her intention to become a composer and win the Prix de Rome herself.

In 1910, Annette Dieudonné became a student of Boulanger's, continuing with her for the next fourteen years. When her studies ended, she began teaching Boulanger's students the rudiments of music and solfège. She was Boulanger's close friend and assistant for the rest of her life.

Boulanger attended the premiere of Diaghilev's ballet The Firebird in Paris, with music by Stravinsky. She immediately recognised the young composer's genius and began a lifelong friendship with him.

In April 1912, Nadia Boulanger made her debut as a conductor, leading the Société des Matinées Musicales orchestra. They performed her 1908 cantata La Sirène, two of her songs, and Pugno's Concertstück for piano and orchestra. The composer played as soloist.

Lili Boulanger won the Prix de Rome composition prize in 1913, the first woman to do so.

With the advent of war in Europe in 1914, public programs were reduced, and Boulanger had to put her performing and conducting on hold. She continued to teach privately and to assist Dallier at the Conservatoire. Nadia was drawn into Lili's expanding war work, and by the end of the year, the sisters had organised a sizable charity, the Comité Franco-Américain du Conservatoire National de Musique et de Déclamation. It supplied items such as food, clothing, money, and letters from home to soldiers who had been musicians before the war.

Weakened by her work during the war, Lili began to suffer ill health. She died in March 1918.

=== Life after Lili's death, 1918–21 ===
Nadia struggled with the death of her sister and according to Jeanice Brooks, "[t]he dichotomy between private grief and public strength was strongly characteristic of Boulanger's frame of mind in the immediate aftermath of World War I. Privately, Nadia kept a shrine to her sister in her home. This was likely influenced by the resurgence of spiritism, the interest in a person’s spiritual existence after death and communication with lost loved ones. It may have also been influenced by her involvement in Catholicism, which utilizes objects, figures, and rituals as mediators between the living and the dead. Guilt at surviving her talented sibling seems to have led to determination to deserve Lili's death, which Nadia framed as redemptive sacrifice, by throwing herself into work and domestic responsibility: as Nadia wrote in her datebook in January 1919, 'I place this new year before you, my little beloved Lili–may it see me fulfill my duty towards you–so that it is less terrible for Mother and that I try to resemble you.'"

In 1919, Boulanger performed in more than twenty concerts, often programming her own music and that of her sister. Since the Conservatoire Femina-Musica had closed during the war, Alfred Cortot and Auguste Mangeot founded a new music school in Paris, which opened later that year as the École normale de musique de Paris. Boulanger was invited by Cortot to join the school, where she taught classes in harmony, counterpoint, musical analysis, organ and composition.

Mangeot also asked Boulanger to contribute articles of music criticism to his paper Le Monde Musical, and she occasionally provided articles for this and other newspapers for the rest of her life, though she never felt at ease setting her opinions down for posterity in this way.

In 1920, Boulanger began to compose again, writing a series of songs to words by Camille Mauclair. In 1921, she performed at two concerts in support of women's rights, both of which featured music by Lili. However, later in life she claimed never to have been involved with feminism, and that women should not have the right to vote as they "lacked the necessary political sophistication."

=== American School at Fontainebleau, 1921–1935 ===
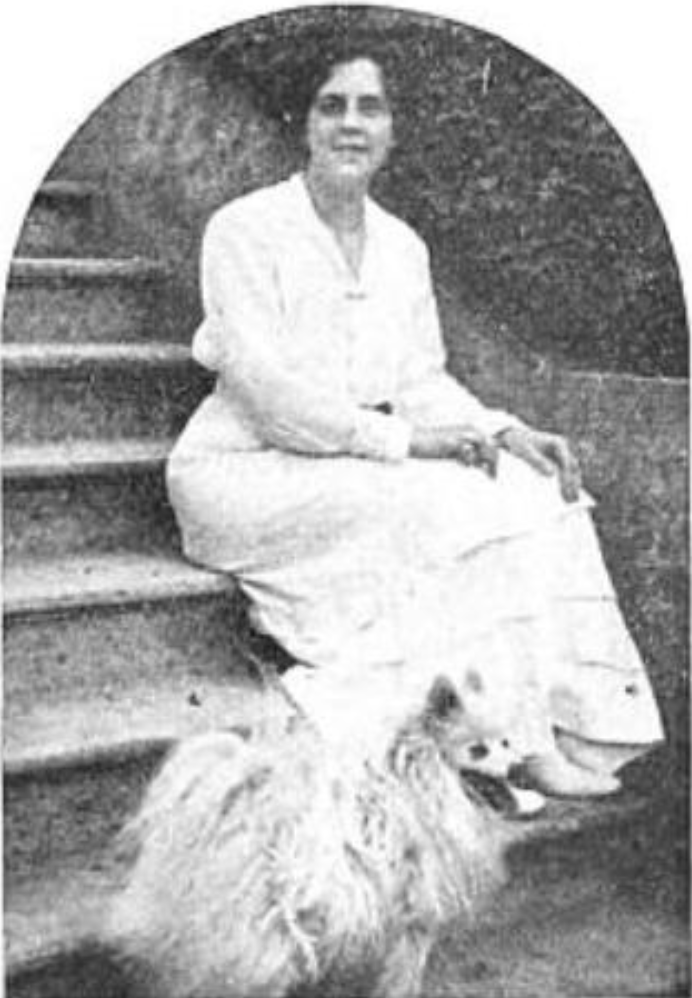
Boulanger in 1925

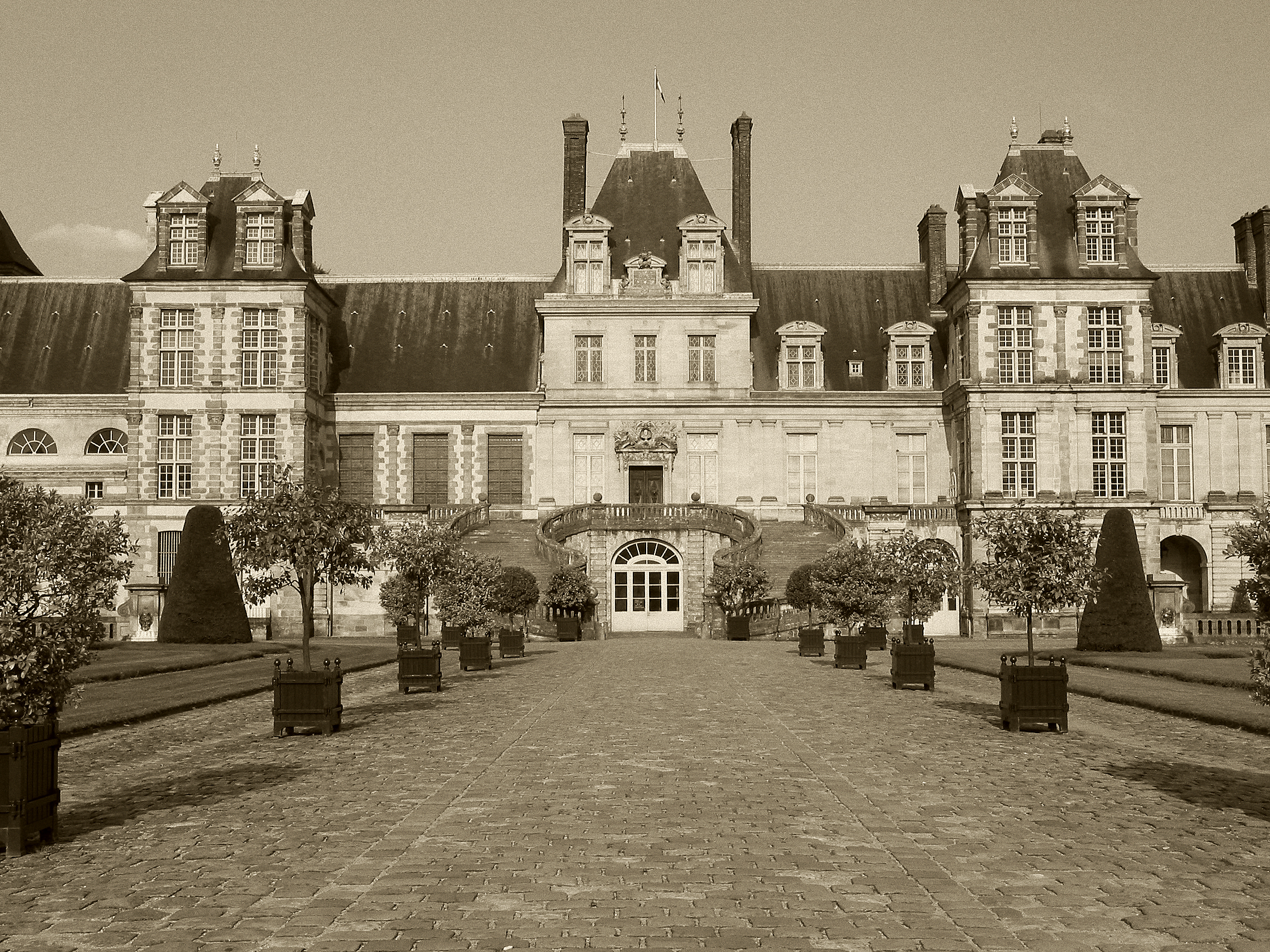
Château de Fontainebleau

In the summer of 1921, the French Music School for Americans opened at Fontainebleau, with Boulanger listed on the programme as a professor of harmony. Her close friend Isidor Philipp headed the piano departments of both the Paris Conservatory and the new Fontainebleau School and was an important draw for American students. She inaugurated the custom, which would continue for the rest of her life, of inviting the best students to her summer residence at Gargenville one weekend for lunch and dinner. Among the students attending the first year at Fontainebleau was Aaron Copland.

Boulanger's unrelenting schedule of teaching, performing, composing, and writing letters started to take its toll on her health; she had frequent migraines and toothaches. She stopped writing as a critic for Le Monde musical as she could not attend the requisite concerts. To maintain her and her mother's living standards, she concentrated on teaching which was her most lucrative source of income. Fauré believed she was mistaken to stop composing, but she told him, "If there is one thing of which I am certain, it is that I wrote useless music."

In 1924, Walter Damrosch, Arthur Judson and the New York Symphony Society arranged for Boulanger to tour the USA. She set sail on the Cunard flagship RMS Aquitania on Christmas Eve. The ship arrived on New Year's Eve in New York after an extremely rough crossing. During this tour, she performed solo organ works, pieces by Lili, and premiered Copland's new Symphony for Organ and Orchestra, which he had written for her. She returned to France on 28 February 1925.

Later that year, Boulanger approached the publisher G. Schirmer to enquire if they would be interested in publishing her methods of teaching music to children. When nothing came of it, she abandoned trying to write about her ideas.

Gershwin visited Boulanger in 1927, asking for lessons in composition. They spoke for half an hour after which Boulanger announced, "I can teach you nothing." Taking this as a compliment, Gershwin repeated the story many times.

The Great Depression increased social tensions in France. Days after the Stavisky riots in February 1934, and in the midst of a general strike, Boulanger resumed conducting. She made her Paris debut with the orchestra of the École normale in a programme of Mozart, Bach, and Jean Françaix. Boulanger's private classes continued; Elliott Carter recalled that students who did not dare to cross Paris through the riots showed only that they did not "take music seriously enough". By the end of the year, she was conducting the Orchestre Philharmonique de Paris in the Théâtre des Champs-Élysées with a programme of Bach, Monteverdi and Schütz.

Her mother Raissa died in March 1935, after a long decline. This freed Boulanger from some of her ties to Paris, which had prevented her from taking up teaching opportunities in the United States.

=== Touring and recording ===
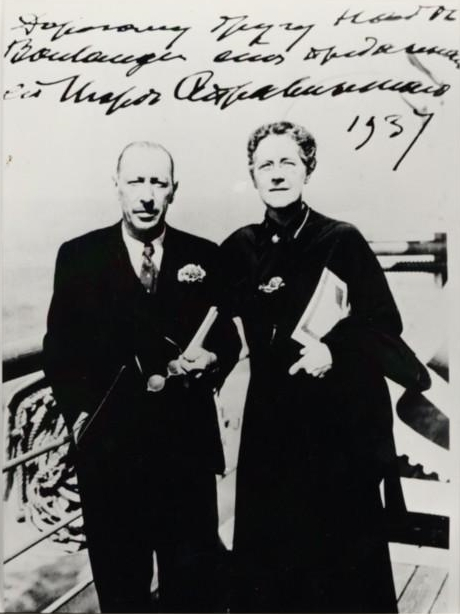
Boulanger with Igor Stravinsky

In 1936, Boulanger substituted for Alfred Cortot in some of his piano masterclasses, coaching the students in Mozart's keyboard works. Later in the year, she traveled to London to broadcast her lecture-recitals for the BBC, as well as to conduct works including Schütz, Fauré and Lennox Berkeley. Noted as the first woman to conduct the London Philharmonic Orchestra, she received acclaim for her performances.

Boulanger's long-held passion for Monteverdi culminated in her recording six discs of madrigals for His Master's Voice in 1937, which brought his music to a new, wider audience. Not all reviewers approved her use of modern instruments.

When Paul Hindemith published his The Craft of Musical Composition, Boulanger asked him for permission to translate the text into French, and to add her own comments. Hindemith never responded to her offer. After he fled from Nazi Germany to the United States, they did not discuss the matter further.

Late in 1937, Boulanger returned to Britain to broadcast for the BBC and hold her popular lecture-recitals. In November, she became the first woman to conduct a complete concert of the Royal Philharmonic Society in London, which included Fauré's Requiem and Monteverdi's Amor (Lamento della ninfa). Describing her concerts, Mangeot wrote,

She never uses a dynamic level louder than mezzo-forte and she takes pleasure in veiled, murmuring sonorities, from which she nevertheless obtains great power of expression. She arranges her dynamic levels so as never to have need of fortissimo ...

In 1938, Boulanger returned to the US for a longer tour. She had arranged to give a series of lectures at Radcliffe, Harvard, Wellesley and the Longy School of Music, and to broadcast for NBC. During this tour, she became the first woman to conduct the Boston Symphony Orchestra. In her three months there, she gave over a hundred lecture-recitals, recitals and concerts These included the world premiere of Stravinsky's Dumbarton Oaks Concerto. At that time she was seen by American sculptor Katharine Lane Weems who recorded in her diary, "Her voice is surprisingly deep. She is quite slim with an excellent figure and fine features, Her skin is delicate, her hair graying slightly, she wears pince-nez and gesticulates as she becomes excited talking about music."

His Master's Voice issued two additional Boulanger records in 1938: the Piano Concerto in D by Jean Françaix, which she conducted; and the Brahms Liebeslieder Waltzes, in which she and Dinu Lipatti were the duo pianists with a vocal ensemble, and (again with Lipatti) a selection of the Brahms Waltzes, Op. 39 for piano four hands.

During Boulanger's tour of America the following year, she became the first woman to conduct the New York Philharmonic Orchestra at Carnegie Hall, the Philadelphia Orchestra and the Washington National Symphony Orchestra. She gave 102 lectures in 118 days across the US.

=== Second World War and emigration, 1940–45 ===
As the Second World War loomed, Boulanger helped her students leave France. She made plans to do so herself. Stravinsky joined her at Gargenville, where they awaited news of the German attack against France. Waiting to leave France till the last moment before the invasion and occupation, Boulanger arrived in New York via Madrid and Lisbon on 6 November 1940. After her arrival, Boulanger traveled to the Longy School of Music in Cambridge, Massachusetts, to give classes in harmony, fugue, counterpoint and advanced composition. In 1942, she also began teaching at the Peabody Conservatory in Baltimore. Her classes included music history, harmony, counterpoint, fugue, orchestration and composition.

=== Later life in Paris, 1946–79 ===
Leaving America at the end of 1945, she returned to France in January 1946. There she accepted a position of professor of accompagnement au piano at the Paris Conservatoire. In 1953, she was appointed overall director of the Fontainebleau School. She also continued her touring to other countries.

As a long-standing friend of the family, and as official chapel-master to the Prince of Monaco, Boulanger was asked to organise the music for the wedding of Prince Rainier of Monaco and the American actress Grace Kelly in 1956. In 1958, she returned to the US for a six-week tour. She combined broadcasting, lecturing, and making four television films.

Also in 1958, she was inducted as an Honorary Member into Sigma Alpha Iota, the international women's music fraternity, by the Gamma Delta chapter at the Crane School of Music in Potsdam, New York.

In 1962, she toured Turkey, where she conducted concerts with her young protégée İdil Biret. Later that year, she was invited to the White House of the United States by President John F. Kennedy and his wife Jacqueline, and in 1966, she was invited to Moscow to a jury for the International Tchaikovsky Competition, chaired by Emil Gilels. While in England, she taught at the Yehudi Menuhin School. She also gave lectures at the Royal College of Music and the Royal Academy of Music, all of which were broadcast by the BBC.

Her eyesight and hearing began to fade toward the end of her life. On 13 August 1977, in advance of her 90th birthday, she was given a surprise birthday celebration at Fontainebleau's English Garden. The school's chef had prepared a large cake, on which was inscribed: "1887–Happy Birthday to you, Nadia Boulanger–Fontainebleau, 1977". When the cake was served, 90 small white candles floating on the pond illuminated the area. Boulanger's then-protégé, Emile Naoumoff, performed a piece he had composed for the occasion. Boulanger worked almost until her death in 1979 in Paris. She is buried at the Montmartre Cemetery with her sister Lili and their parents.

== Pedagogy ==
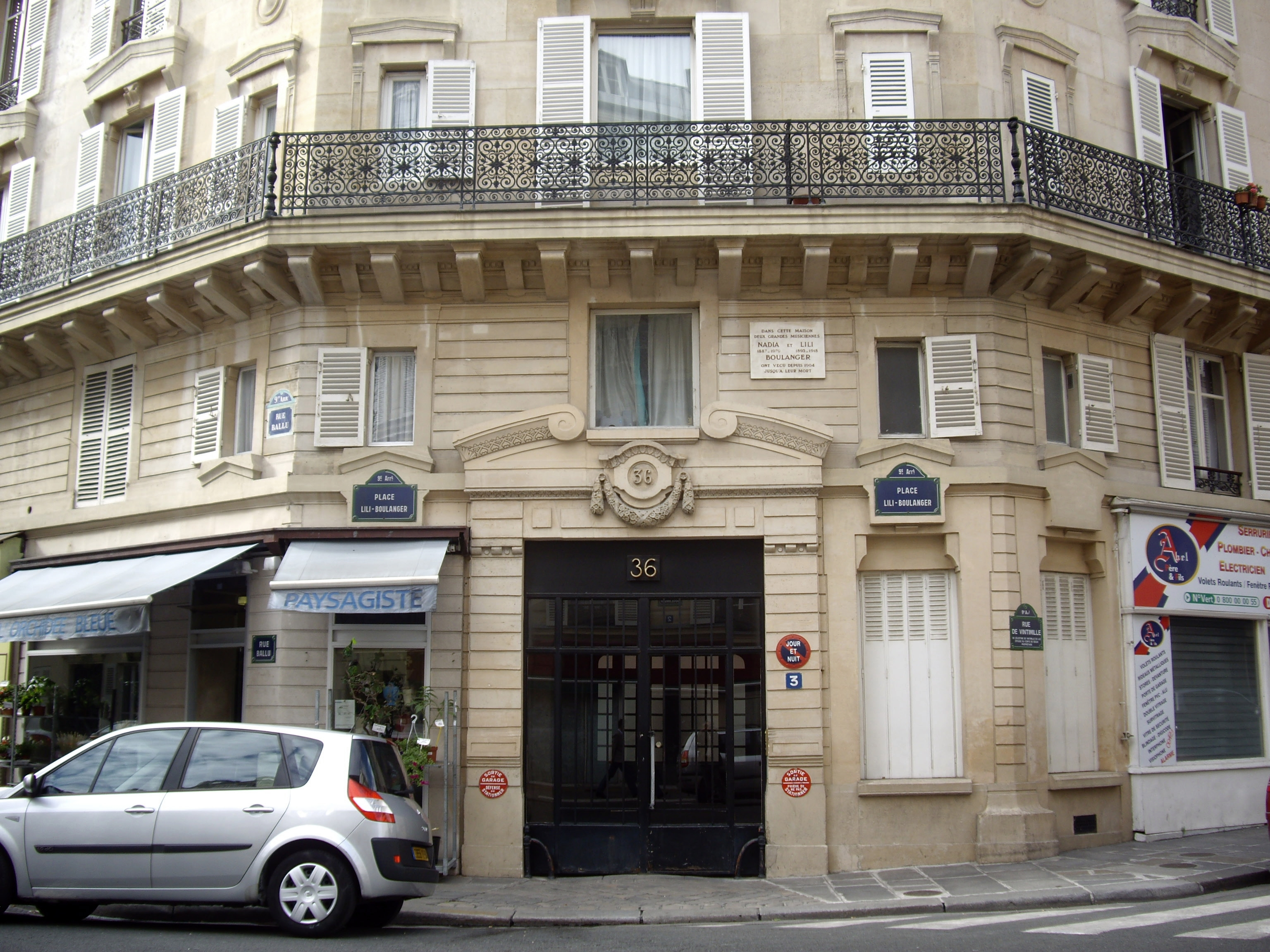
36 rue Ballu, Paris

Asked about the difference between a well-made work and a masterpiece, Boulanger replied,

I can tell whether a piece is well-made or not, and I believe that there are conditions without which masterpieces cannot be achieved, but I also believe that what defines a masterpiece cannot be pinned down. I won't say that the criterion for a masterpiece does not exist, but I don't know what it is.

She claimed to enjoy all "good music". According to Lennox Berkeley, "A good waltz has just as much value to her as a good fugue, and this is because she judges a work solely on its aesthetic content." "She was an admirer of Debussy, and a disciple of Ravel. Although she bore little sympathy for Schoenberg and the Viennese dodecaphonicians, she was an ardent champion of Stravinsky."

She insisted on complete attention at all times: "Anyone who acts without paying attention to what he is doing is wasting his life. I'd go so far as to say that life is denied by lack of attention, whether it be to cleaning windows or trying to write a masterpiece."

In 1920, two of her favourite female students left her to marry. She thought they had betrayed their work with her and their obligation to music. Her attitude to women in music was contradictory: despite Lili's success and her own eminence as a teacher, she held throughout her life that a woman's duty was to be a wife and mother. According to Ned Rorem, she would "always give the benefit of the doubt to her male students while overtaxing the females". She saw teaching as a pleasure, a privilege and a duty: "No-one is obliged to give lessons. It poisons your life if you give lessons and it bores you."

Boulanger accepted pupils from any background; her only criterion was that they had to want to learn. She treated students differently depending on their ability: her talented students were expected to answer the most rigorous questions and perform well under stress. The less able students, who did not intend to follow a career in music, were treated more leniently, and Michel Legrand claimed that the ones she disliked were graduated with a first prize in one year: "The good pupils never got a reward so they stayed. I was [there] for seven years. And I never obtained a first prize". Each student had to be approached differently: "When you accept a new pupil, the first thing is to try to understand what natural gift, what intuitive talent he has. Each individual poses a particular problem." "It does not matter what style you use, as long as you use it consistently." Boulanger used a variety of teaching methods, including traditional harmony, score reading at the piano, species counterpoint, analysis, and sight-singing (using fixed-Do solfège).

When she first looked at a student's score, she often commented on its relation to the work of a variety of composers: for example, "[T]hese measures have the same harmonic progressions as Bach's F major prelude and Chopin's F major Ballade. Can you not come up with something more interesting?" Virgil Thomson found this process frustrating: "Anyone who allowed her in any piece to tell him what to do next would see that piece ruined before his eyes by the application of routine recipes and bromides from standard repertory." Copland recalled that "she had but one all-embracing principle ... the creation of what she called la grande ligne – the long line in music." She disapproved of innovation for innovation's sake: "When you are writing music of your own, never strain to avoid the obvious." She said, "You need an established language and then, within that established language, the liberty to be yourself. It's always necessary to be yourself – that is a mark of genius in itself." Quincy Jones says Boulanger told him "Your music can never be more or less than you are as a human being".

She always claimed that she could not bestow creativity onto her students and that she could only help them to become intelligent musicians who understood the craft of composition. "I can't provide anyone with inventiveness, nor can I take it away; I can simply provide the liberty to read, to listen, to see, to understand." Only inspiration could make the difference between a well-made piece and an artistic one. She believed that the desire to learn, to become better, was all that was required to achieve – always provided the right amount of work was put in. She would quote the examples of Rameau (who wrote his first opera at fifty), Wojtowicz (who became a concert pianist at thirty-one), and Roussel (who had no professional access to music till he was twenty-five), as counter-arguments to the idea that great artists always develop out of gifted children.

Her memory was prodigious: by the time she was twelve, she knew the whole of Bach's Well-Tempered Clavier by heart. Students have described her as knowing every significant piece, by every significant composer. Copland recalls,

Nadia Boulanger knew everything there was to know about music; she knew the oldest and the latest music, pre-Bach and post-Stravinsky. All technical know-how was at her fingertips: harmonic transposition, the figured bass, score reading, organ registration, instrumental techniques, structural analyses, the school fugue and the free fugue, the Greek modes and Gregorian chant.

Murray Perahia recalled being "awed by the rhythm and character" with which she played a line of a Bach fugue. Janet Craxton recalled listening to Boulanger's playing Bach chorales on the piano as "the single greatest musical experience of my life".

== Honours and awards ==
- 1932 Chevalier of the Légion d'honneur
- 1934 Order of Polonia Restituta
- 1962 Foreign Honorary Member of the American Academy of Arts and Sciences
- 1962 Howland Memorial Prize
- 1975 Médaille d'Or of the Académie des Beaux-Arts of the Institut de France
- 1977 Grand officier to the Légion d'honneur
- 1977 Order of the British Empire
- 1977 Order of St. Charles of Monaco
- 1977 Order of the Crown of Belgium
- 2012 Induction into the American Classical Music Hall of Fame

== Key works ==
Vocal

- Allons voir sur le lac d'argent (A. Silvestre), 2 voices, piano, 1905
- Ecoutez la chanson bien douce (Verlaine), 1 voice, orchestra, 1905
- Les sirènes (Grandmougin), female chorus, orchestra, 1905
- À l'aube (Silvestre), chorus, orchestra, 1906
- À l'hirondelle (Sully Prudhomme), chorus, orchestra, 1908
- La sirène (E. Adenis/Desveaux), 3 voices, orchestra, 1908
- Dnégouchka (G. Delaquys), 3 voices, orchestra, 1909
- Over 30 songs for 1 voice, piano, incl.:

Extase (Hugo), 1901
Désespérance (Verlaine), 1902
Cantique de sœur Béatrice (Maeterlinck), 1909
Une douceur splendide et sombre (A. Samain), 1909
Larme solitaire (Heine), 1909
Une aube affaiblie (Verlaine), 1909
Prière (Bataille), 1909
Soir d'hiver (N. Boulanger), 1915
Au bord de la nuit, Chanson, Le couteau, Doute, L'échange (Mauclair), 1922
J'ai frappé (R. de Marquein), 1922

Chamber and solo works

- 3 pièces, organ, 1911, arr. cello, piano
- 3 pièces, piano, 1914
- Pièce sur des airs populaires flamands, organ, 1917
- Vers la vie nouvelle, piano, 1917

Orchestral

- Allegro, 1905
- Fantaisie variée, piano, orchestra, 1912

With Raoul Pugno

- Les heures claires (Verhaeren), 8 songs, 1 voice, piano, 1909
- La ville morte (d'Annunzio), opera, 1910–13

== Recordings ==
- Mademoiselle: Premiere Audience – Unknown Music of Nadia Boulanger, Delos DE 3496 (2017)
- Tribute to Nadia Boulanger, Cascavelle VEL 3081 (2004)
- BBC Legends: Nadia Boulanger, BBCL 40262 (1999)
- Women of Note. Koch International Classics B000001SKH (1997)
- Chamber Music by French Female Composers. Classic Talent B000002K49 (2000)
- Le Baroque Avant Le Baroque. EMI Classics France B000CS43RG (2006)
- Faurè Requiem, Op. 48, EMI Reference, PM 322, 1979
