= Mozart & Rossini Arias =

- Philips LP, 9500-098

Studio album by Frederica von Stade
- Released: 1976
- Studios: De Doelen, Rotterdam and Grande Salle, Épalinges, Switzerland (second version only)
- Genre: Opera
- Length: 52:36 (first and third versions), 69:10 (second version)
- Language: Italian
- Labels: Philips (first and second versions), PentaTone Classics (third version)
- Producer: Wilhelm Hellweg

Mozart & Rossini Arias
- PentaTone SACD, 5186-158

Frederica von Stade sings Mozart & Rossini Arias is a 52-minute studio album of operatic arias performed by von Stade and the Rotterdam Philharmonic Orchestra under the direction of Edo de Waart. It was released in 1976. A second, 69-minute version of the album, Frederica von Stade: Haydn, Mozart & Rossini Arias, released by Philips on CD, adds bonus tracks derived from von Stade's contributions to Antal Doráti's recordings of Joseph Haydn's operas La fedeltà premiata and Il mondo della luna. A third, 52-minute version released on SACD by PentaTone in 2005 reverts to the contents (and title) of the first version, but presents the music in quadraphonic surround sound.

== Recording ==
The Mozart and Rossini music common to all three versions of the album was recorded using analogue technology in quadrophonic (4-channel) sound in September 1975 in De Doelen, Rotterdam. The second version's music from Joseph Haydn's operas La fedeltà premiata and Il mondo della luna was recorded using analogue technology in June 1975 and September 1977 respectively in the Grande Salle, Épalinges, Switzerland.

== Cover art ==
The cover of the first version of the album features a photograph of von Stade taken by her first husband, Peter Elkus. (When von Stade and Elkus divorced, he cited his contributions to her album covers in his successful litigation to secure a share of her future earnings.) The cover of the second version features a photograph of von Stade taken by Mike Evans. The cover of the third version, designed by Netherlands, features a photograph of von Stade taken by Marcia Lieberman.

== Critical reception ==
=== Reviews ===
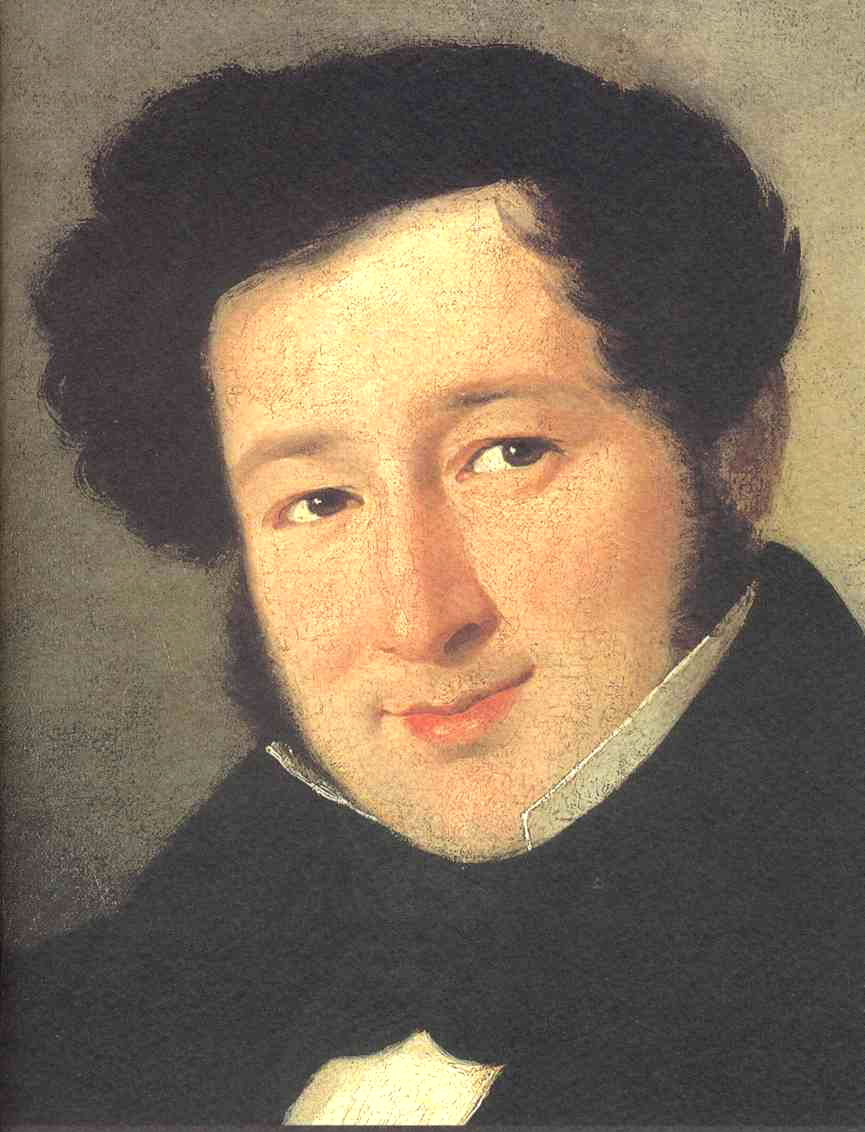
Gioachino Rossini, painted by an unknown artist

Alan Blyth reviewed the first version of the album on LP in Gramophone in February 1977. If he were in charge of an opera house, he wrote, he would be eagerly planning a staging of Rossini's Otello, That was how much he had been enthused by hearing Frederica von Stade's performance of Rossini's version of Desdemona's Willow Song scene. To understand his excitement, readers had only to "listen how her voice runs delicately through the phrase 'Salce d'amor delizia' ending with a heartrending diminuendo ... or how affectingly she touches in the recitative, or how she rightly allows a little harshness into her lovely tone in the word 'l'ingrato' or covers it for the Prayer". These details were no doubt the result of meticulous design, and yet von Stade's execution of them felt wholly free of artifice.

Her characterization of Angelina, the Cinderella of La Cenerentola, was just as vivid a portrait (and based, thankfully, on a modern, scholarly edition of Rossini's score). The roulades of the opera's concluding scene were delineated with precision. When the La Scala company had recently brought their production of La Cenerentola to Covent Garden, Lucia Valentini Terrani had presented Angelina's music with "a fearsome and speedy brilliance"; von Stade, "forgetting and forgiving in her final Rondo", offered "a tender lightness that is just as winning".

Von Stade had also recently sung Rossini at the Royal Opera House, debuting there as Rosina in Il barbiere di Siviglia. Her recording of "Una voce poco fà" was "as bewitchingly as on stage". Her Rosina was mischievous and flirtatious, but had a gentleness about her too, as well as a rapid vibrato that was rather appealing.

All three items on the A side of the LP were very effective dramatically. The B side began with a portrayal of Mozart's Cherubino that was no less compelling. Just as she had when appearing in Le nozze di Figaro at Glyndebourne, von Stade brought us "a palpitating youth - swooning, too, in a nicely easy-going and varied 'Voi che sapete'". And her "tender, seductive" Zerlina from Don Giovanni was a girl whose embraces nobody could resist.

La clemenza di Tito was the one work that von Stade drew on with less than total success. In Sesto's "Parto, parto", she was perfect - she sang its striking divisions accurately but without ostentation, and she conveyed all of Sesto's "sincerity and faith". But her reading of Vitellia's "Non più di fiore" paled by comparison with that of Janet Baker in a recent staging at Covent Garden. Baker had sung the role with a "variety of colour and nuance" that von Stade could not equal. Von Stade might make a convincingly "scheming, nasty" Vitellia one day, but that day had not come yet.

Teresa Rieu was a graceful harpist accompanying Desdemona, and Bas de Jong was an unimpeachable clarinetist accompanying Sesto. George Pieterson was adroit but "less advantageously placed" with his basset-horn in Vitellia's aria. The Rotterdam Philharmonic Orchestra and Edo de Waart were proficient but not outstanding. Philips's engineers had put von Stade so close to her microphone that one could hear her breathing, but their balancing worked very well.

George Jellinek reviewed the first version of the album on LP as a "recording of special merit" in Stereo Review in May 1977. Frederica von Stade, he wrote, had followed her first operatic recital - her Columbia disc of French Opera Arias - with a sequel of music in which she was altogether at home. Her record's B side, devoted to Mozart, was marginally better than its Rossinian side A.

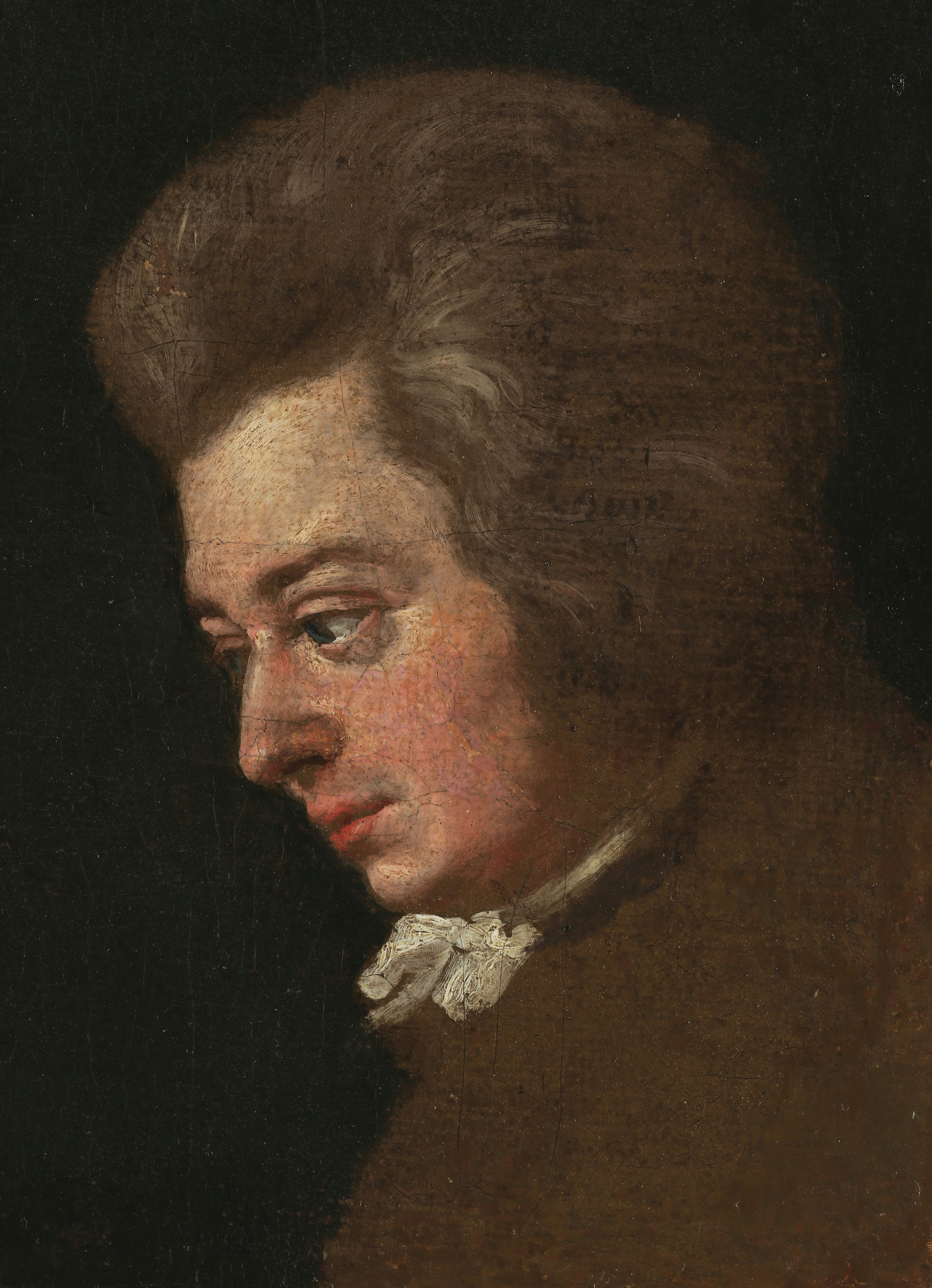
Wolfgang Amadeus Mozart, painted by his brother-in-law, Joseph Lange

Her performance as Cherubino was staged in America and Europe, and included on her album. She performed as a high mezzo-soprano for the role of Zerlina, and sang two excerpts from La clemenza di Tito.

In her Rossini selections, she performed "winningly" both in Desdemona's sorrowful music and in Angelina'a and Rosina's pyrotechnic bel canto showpieces. But her technique was not altogether beyond reproach. On the one hand, her fioriture in La Cenerentola and in Il barbiere di Siviglia (as in Mozart's "Parto. parto") lacked the superlative precision achieved by Janet Baker, Teresa Berganza and Marilyn Horne. On the other hand, her Rosina, while characterful, did not sound as spontaneous as was desirable.

Bas de Jong and George Pieterson both negotiated their tricky obbligato woodwind parts adeptly. The playing of the Rotterdam Philharmonic Orchestra was "nicely articulated and warm". Conducting, Edo de Waart set far too slow a tempo for Desdemona. Philips's audio quality was very good.

Profiling von Stade in Time magazine (13 December 1976), the unnamed author wrote that the album displayed "a lustrous amber mezzo-soprano voice with an unusually sweet crystalline top and seemingly effortless agility". The album was also reviewed in The complete Penguin stereo record and cassette guide, which reported that "Frederica von Stade is, as always, magically compelling here, both in vocal personality and in ... vocal production".

=== Accolades ===
The album was nominated for a Grammy award for the best classical solo vocal performance of 1977. Alan Blyth included the album in his 1977 Gramophone Critics' Choice list of the best recordings of the year.

== Track listings ==
=== First and third versions ===
Philips LP (9500–098) and PentaTone SACD (5186–158)

Gioachino Rossini (1792–1868)

Il barbiere di Siviglia, ossia L'inutile precauzione ("The barber of Seville, or The useless precaution", Rome, 1816), with a libretto by Cesare Sterbini (1784–1831) after Le Barbier de Séville (1775) by Pierre Beaumarchais (1732–1799)

- 1 (5:46) Cavatina (Rosina): "Una voce poco fà...Io sono docile"

Otello, ossia Il moro di Venezia ("Othello, or The Moor of Venice", Naples, 1816), with a libretto by Francesco Maria Berio, Marchese di Salsa, after The tragedy of Othello, the Moor of Venice (?1603) by William Shakespeare (1564–1616)

- 2 (13:35) Canzona e preghiera (Desdemona): "Assisa a piè d'un salice...Deh! calma, o ciel, nel sonno"

La Cenerentola, ossia La bontà in trionfo ("Cinderella, or Goodness triumphant", Rome, 1817), with a libretto by Jacopo Ferretti (1784–1852) after Cendrillon, ou la petite pantoufle de verre ("Cinderella, or The little glass slipper", 1697) by Charles Perrault (1628–1703)

- 3 (6:26) Rondo (Angelina): "Nacqui all' affanno...Non più mesta"

Wolfgang Amadeus Mozart (1756–1791)

Le nozze di Figaro ("The marriage of Figaro", K. 492, Vienna, 1786), with a libretto by Lorenzo da Ponte (1749–1838) after La folle journée, ou le Mariage de Figaro ("The mad day, or The marriage of Figaro", 1784) by Pierre Beaumarchais (1732–1799)

- 4 (3:05) Aria (Cherubino): "Non so più"
- 5 (3:10) Canzona (Cherubino) "Voi, che sapete"

La clemenza di Tito ("The clemency of Titus", K. 621, Prague, 1791), with a libretto by Caterino Mazzolà (1745–1806) after Pietro Metastasio (1698–1782)

- 6 (9:27) Recitativo accompagnato e rondo (Vitellia): "Ecco il punto...Non più di fiori"

Il dissoluto punito, ossia il Don Giovanni ("The rake punished, or Don Giovanni", K. 527, Prague, 1787), with a libretto by Lorenzo da Ponte after El burlador de Seville y convidado de piedra ("The trickster of Seville and the stone guest", ?1616) by Tirso de Molina (1579–1648)

- 7 (3:57) Aria (Zerlina): "Vedrai, carino"

La clemenza di Tito

- 8 (6:30) Aria (Sesto): "Parto, parto...Guardami, e tutto obblio"

=== Second version ===
Philips CD (420–084–2)

Joseph Haydn (1732–1809)

La fedeltà premiata ("Fidelity rewarded", Hob. XXVIII/10, Eszterháza, 1781), with a libretto by Haydn and an unknown colleague after L'infedeltà fedele by Giambattista Lorenzi

- 1 (1:44) Aria (Amaranta) e recitativo accompagnato (Amaranta, Melibeo): "Per te m'accese amore"
- 2 (3:01) Aria (Amaranta): "Vanne... fuggi... traditore!"
- 3 (7:18) Recitativo accompagnato ed aria (Amaranta): "Barbaro conte... Dell' amor mio fedele"

Il mondo della luna ("The world on the moon", Hob. XXVIII/7, Eszterháza, 1777), with a libretto after Carlo Goldoni (1707–1793)

- 4 (4:06) Aria (Lisetta): "Una donna come me"

Wolfgang Amadeus Mozart

Le nozze di Figaro

- 5 (3:06) Aria (Cherubino): "Non so più"
- 6 (3:12) Canzona (Cherubino): "Voi che sapete"

La clemenza di Tito

- 7 (9:29) Recitativo accompagnato e rondo (Vitellia): "Ecco il punto... Non più di fiori"

Don Giovanni

- 8 (3:59) Aria (Zerlina): "Vedrai, carino"

La clemenza di Tito

- 9 (6:27) Aria (Sesto): "Parto, parto... Guardami, e tutto obblio"

Gioacchino Rossini

Il barbiere di Siviglia

- 10 (5:46) Cavatina (Rosina): "Una voce poco fà... Io sono docile"

Otello

- 11 (13:37) Canzona e preghiera (Desdemona): "Assisa a piè d'un salice... Deh! calma, o ciel, nel sonno"

La Cenerentola

- 12 (6:30) Rondo (Angelina): "Nacqui all'affanno... Non più mesta"

== Personnel ==
=== Musical ===
- Frederica von Stade (b. 1945), mezzo-soprano
- Maurizio Mazzieri, baritone (second version, track 1)
- Teresia Rieu, harp (first and third versions, track 2; second version, track 11)
- Bas de Jong, clarinet (first and third versions, track 6; second version, track 7)
- George Pieterson (1942–2016), basset-horn (first and third versions, track 8; second version, track 9)
- Michel Perret, harpsichord (second version, tracks 1–3)
- Pablo Loerkens, cello (second version, tracks 1–4)
- Fritz Widmer, double bass (second version, tracks 1–4)
- Rotterdam Philharmonic Orchestra (first and third versions, tracks 1–8; second version, tracks 5–12)
- Edo de Waart (b. 1941), conductor (first and third versions, tracks 1–8; second version, tracks 5–12)
- Orchestre de Chambre de Lausanne (second version, tracks 1–4)
- Antal Doráti (1906–1988), harpsichord and conductor (second version, tracks 1–4)

=== Other ===
- Wilhelm Hellweg, producer

== Release history ==
In 1976, Philips released the first version of the album on a stereo LP (catalogue number 9500-098), with sleeve notes, texts and translations; a mistake wrongly credited the harpist Teresia Rieu with accompanying Angelina rather than Desdemona. The album was also issued on cassette (catalogue number 7300-511).

Philips issued the second version of the album on CD only (catalogue number 420-084-2), packaging the disc in a slipcase with a 44-page booklet of texts and translations and notes by J F. Mastroianni. In 2005, PentaTone Classics issued the album as a 4-channel SACD (catalogue number 5186-158), with a 36-page booklet with texts and translations and notes by Jean Marie Geijsen and Franz Steiger.

(A compilation album titled Frederica von Stade: Rossini, Haydn, Mozart, released by Philips on LP [catalogue number 9500-716] and cassette [catalogue number 7300-807] in 1979, includes the four Haydn numbers that feature on the second version of the present album and shares its cover art, but is otherwise unrelated to it. Its other contents are one further excerpt from von Stade's recording of Il mondo della luna and some numbers from her complete recordings of La clemenza di Tito and Rossini's Otello.)
