= Song Recital =

- Columbia LP, M-35127

Studio album by Frederica von Stade
- Released: 1978
- Studio: CBS 30th Street Studio, New York City
- Genre: Classical vocal
- Length: 54:00
- Language: English, German and French
- Label: Columbia
- Producer: Paul Walter Myers

Song Recital is a 54-minute studio album of Lieder, mélodies and English and American songs performed by Frederica von Stade with piano accompaniment by Martin Katz. It was released in 1978.

== Background and recording ==
The album was recorded using analogue technology on 19 December 1977 in the CBS 30th Street Studio, New York City. It was the first disc on which von Stade performed a song recital by herself; her only earlier essay in the genre had been made together with her friend Judith Blegen.

Forty-eight hours after taping her album, von Stade gave birth to her first child, whom she named Jenny Rebecca after the album's final track. Mother and daughter can be heard singing together on von Stade's 1996 jazz album, Across Your Dreams. (Carol Hall wrote "Jenny Rebecca" as a gift for a friend who had just had a baby. The first of Hall's compositions to appear on disc, it was first recorded by a young Barbra Streisand in 1965.)

== Cover art ==
The vinyl and cassette versions of the album both use a design featuring a photograph of von Stade taken by her first husband, Peter Elkus. When von Stade and Elkus divorced, he cited his contributions to her album covers in his successful litigation to secure a share of her future earnings.

== Critical reception ==
=== Reviews ===
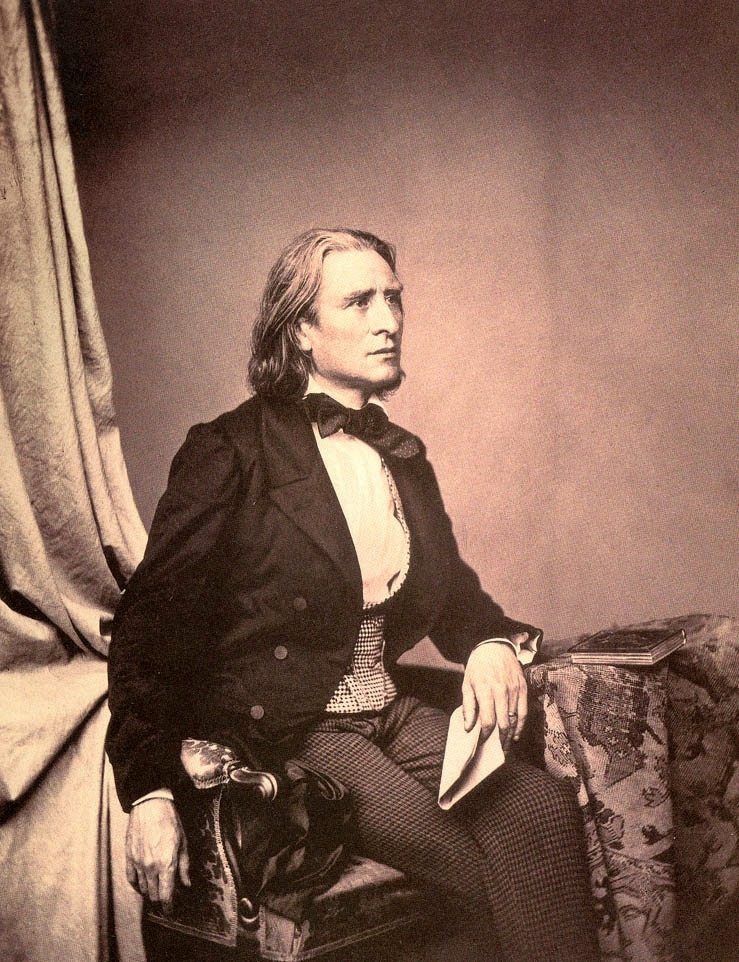
Franz Liszt, painted by Franz Hanfstaengl in 1858

J. B. Steane reviewed the album on LP in Gramophone in November 1978. "The voice of this lovely singer", he wrote, "is now in its freshest full bloom". The early middle phase of a singer's career should be appreciated and enjoyed like a sunny spell in June. But instead of relishing an artist's springtime with a proper, thankful mindfulness, it was tempting to instead think ahead to her autumn, to "the mellow fruitfulness of the mature interpreter, the ripeness of art that knows all shades of expression, from the most playful to the most profound".

In the first item on Frederica von Stade's recital, for example, Dowland's "Come again, sweet love doth now invite", her singing seemed "placidly hymn-like, wanting sharpness of flavour (and sometimes of consonant too)" when one remembered the "exceptionally strong projection and rhythmic vitality" that Janet Baker had brought to the song when she had recorded it with Gerald Moore. Von Stade's narration in Liszt's Die drei Zigeuner was a little "passive and underlit" in comparison with Elisabeth Schwarzkopf's performance with Geoffrey Parsons. It was true, too that the young Martin Katz's edition of Purcell's "The Blessed Virgin's expostulation" was not as imaginative in its dynamics as Benjamin Britten's, and that von Stade's tempo in its recitative had "a rather square regularity" about it.

But it would be a mistake to allow the weaknesses of von Stade's album to blind one to its merits. Her reading of the Purcell piece was notable for its "tender absorption" and the "lovely pianissimo" of phrases like "flattering hopes, farewell". On the B side of her disc, Debussy's Chansons de Bilitis had "the most winning femininity, 'La chevelure' drawing from the singer a richer, more sensual tone, while a new darkness colours the satyrs' obituary". (Martin Katz was more sensitive in his accompaniment here than he had been when performing the Chansons de Bilitis with Marilyn Horne.) Four folk songs collected and arranged by Canteloube – from his Chants de France, not his more famous Chants d'Auvergne – were "magically evocative, and bolder in the projection of personality". And a modest, contemporary American song, dedicated to the four-day-old "Jenny Rebecca", "serves as an encore piece, allowing the voice to settle and linger graciously in the mind".

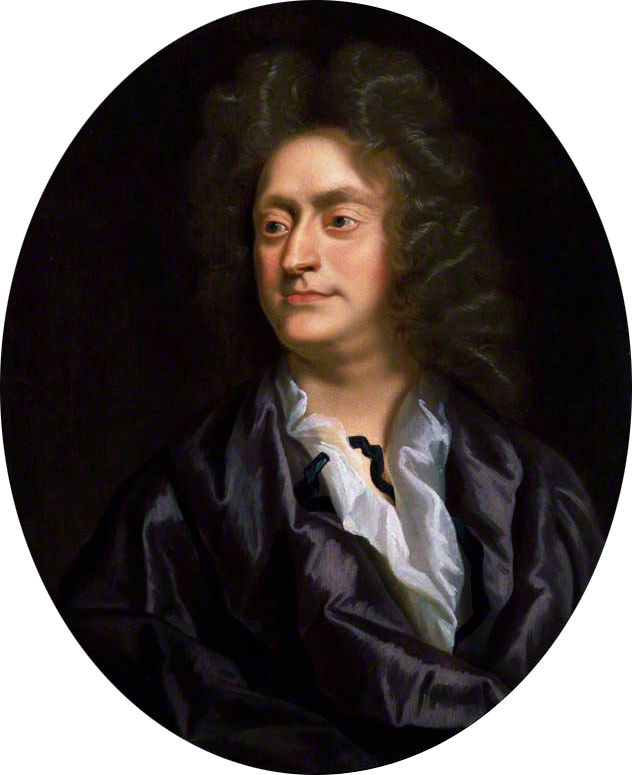
Henry Purcell, painted by John Closterman in 1695

There was no denying that, at least on its A side, the album had its limitations. Von Stade was not yet an eloquent, vivid or creative as she was certain to become in the years ahead. But she was one of the best singers of her generation, and her voice was now at its most beautiful. Her first solo song recital (admirably engineered) was a delightful one, and it was to be hoped that many more would follow it.

George Jellinek reviewed the album on LP as a "recording of special merit" in Stereo Review in June 1979. "Frederica von Stade's artistry", he wrote, "inspires joy and wonder. Her unfailing taste, secure technique and musicianship and exquisitely pure tone – beguilingly warm and youthfully fresh at the same time – may all be counted among the blessings of our musical life".

She had found things in Purcell's "The Blessed Virgin's expostulation" that he had never heard before. She was enchanting in Canteloube's Chants de France. And she was even better in Liszt's "Oh! Quand je dors" and in Debussy's Chansons de Bilitis (songs reminiscent of his Pelléas et Mélisande in their implicit eroticism). Her album was one that few readers would dislike, "for von Stade's charm, style and elegance are irresistible".

David Shengold mentioned the album in Opera News in December 2016, reviewing a box set of von Stade's Columbia CDs in which it had been included. Calling it an exquisitely sung must-have, he wrote that "[it] finds [von Stade] in rich, amazingly pure voice, poignantly expressive in several disparate idioms encompassing Dowland, Purcell and Debussy, plus three ravishing Liszt selections, including the all-time loveliest version of 'Oh! Quand je dors'."

=== Accolades ===
Writing in Gramophone in December 1978, J. B. Steane included the album in his Critics' Choice list of the best recordings of the year. Although the disc had had only limited success in conveying the full character that he knew von Stade to possess, he wrote, he delighted in the fresh bloom on her voice and found that the LP was one that he returned to. The album was nominated for a Grammy award for the best classical solo vocal performance of 1979.

== CD track listing ==
John Dowland (1563–1626), arranged by Martin Katz

The First Booke of Songes or Ayres (1597)

- 1 (2:34) No. 17: "Come again: sweet loue doth now enuite"

The Second Booke of Songs or Ayres (1600)

- 2 (4:33) No. 3: "Sorow sorow stay, lend true repentant teares"

Henry Purcell (1659–1695), arranged by Martin Katz

The Blessed Virgin's expostulation (1693), with a text by Nahum Tate (1652–1715)

- 3 (10:08) "Tell me, some pitying angel"

Franz Liszt (1811–1886)

- 4 (5:15) "Die drei Zigeuner" (1860), S. 320, with a text by Nikolaus Lenau (1802–1850)
- 5 (5:09) "Einst" (1878), S. 332, with a text by Friedrich von Bodenstedt (1819–1892)
- 6 (5:17) "Oh! Quand je dors" (1842, revised 1849), S. 282, with a text by Victor Hugo (1802–1885)

Claude Debussy (1862–1918)

Chansons de Bilitis (1897–1898), with texts by Pierre Louÿs (1870–1925)

- 7 (3:07) "La flûte de Pan"
- 8 (4:03) "La chevelure"
- 9 (3:20) "Le tombeau des Naïades"

Joseph Canteloube (1879–1957), collector and arranger

Chants de France, Vol. 1 (1948), with traditional texts

- 10 (3:37) No. 1: "Auprès de ma blonde" (a round from the Île de France)
- 11 (3:46) No. 2: "Où irai-je me plaindre?" (a song from Haut-Dauphiné)
- 12 (1:40) No. 3: "Au pré de la rose" ("Aou prat dé la roso", a round from Albret and Gascogne)
- 13 (2:23) No. 6: "D'où venez-vous, fillette?" ("D'ound v'enanatz, filheto", a song from Provence)

Carol Hall (1936–2018), arranged by Martin Katz

- 14 ( 3:16) "Jenny Rebecca" (1965), with a text by Carol Hall

== Personnel ==
=== Musical ===
- Frederica von Stade (b. 1945), mezzo-soprano
- Martin Katz (b. 1944), piano and arranger

=== Other ===
- Paul Walter Myers (1932–2015), producer
- Stanley Tonker, engineer
- Mike Ross-Trevor, engineer

== Release history ==
In Europe, Columbia released the album in 1978 (with catalogue numbers 76278 for their LP and 40-76278 for their cassette). In the US, Columbia released it on 3 January 1979 (with catalogue numbers M-35127 for their LP and MT-35127 for their cassette) The vinyl editions had sleeve notes by Robert Jacobson and an insert with texts and translations.

Although excerpts from the album appeared on compilation CDs, it was not issued on silver disc in its entirety until 2012, when Newton Classics included it with a 16-page biographical booklet by David Patrick Stearns in their 4-CD collection Frederica von Stade: Duets, Arias, Scenes & Songs (catalogue number 8802125). In 2016, Sony reissued the album (in a miniature replica of its original American LP sleeve) with a 52-page booklet in their 18-CD collection Frederica von Stade: The Complete Columbia Recital Albums (catalogue number 88875183412).
