= Fauré Mélodies (Frederica von Stade recording) =

Gabriel Fauré: Mélodies
- EMI Records LP, DS-37893

Studio album by Frederica von Stade and Jean-Philippe Collard
- Released: 1983 (first version), 2011 (second version)
- Studio: Salle Wagram, Paris and Halle-aux-Grains, Toulouse (second version only)
- Genre: Classical vocal
- Length: 54:02 (first version), 57:15 (second version)
- Language: French and English (second version only)
- Label: EMI Records
- Producer: Eric Macleod

Fauré Mélodies
- EMI Records CD, 50999-0-94425-2-8

Gabriel Fauré: Mélodies is a 54-minute studio album of eighteen of Fauré's art songs performed by the mezzo-soprano Frederica von Stade with piano accompaniment by Jean-Philippe Collard. It was released in 1983. A second, 57-minute version of the album, released in 2011, includes a bonus track in which von Stade sings the Chanson de Mélisande from Fauré's incidental music for Maurice Maeterlinck's play Pelléas et Mélisande, accompanied by the Orchestre national du Capitole de Toulouse under the direction of Michel Plasson.

== Recording ==
The eighteen songs on the first version of the album were digitally recorded on 16–18 December 1981 and on 8 June 1982 in the Salle Wagram, Paris. The nineteenth song that was added to the second version of the album was recorded using analogue technology on 12–15 June 1980 in the Halle-aux-Grains, Toulouse.

== Cover art ==
The cover of the second version of the album was designed by Shaun Mills for WLP Ltd, and features a photograph of von Stade taken by Julian Broad.

== Critical reception ==
=== Reviews ===
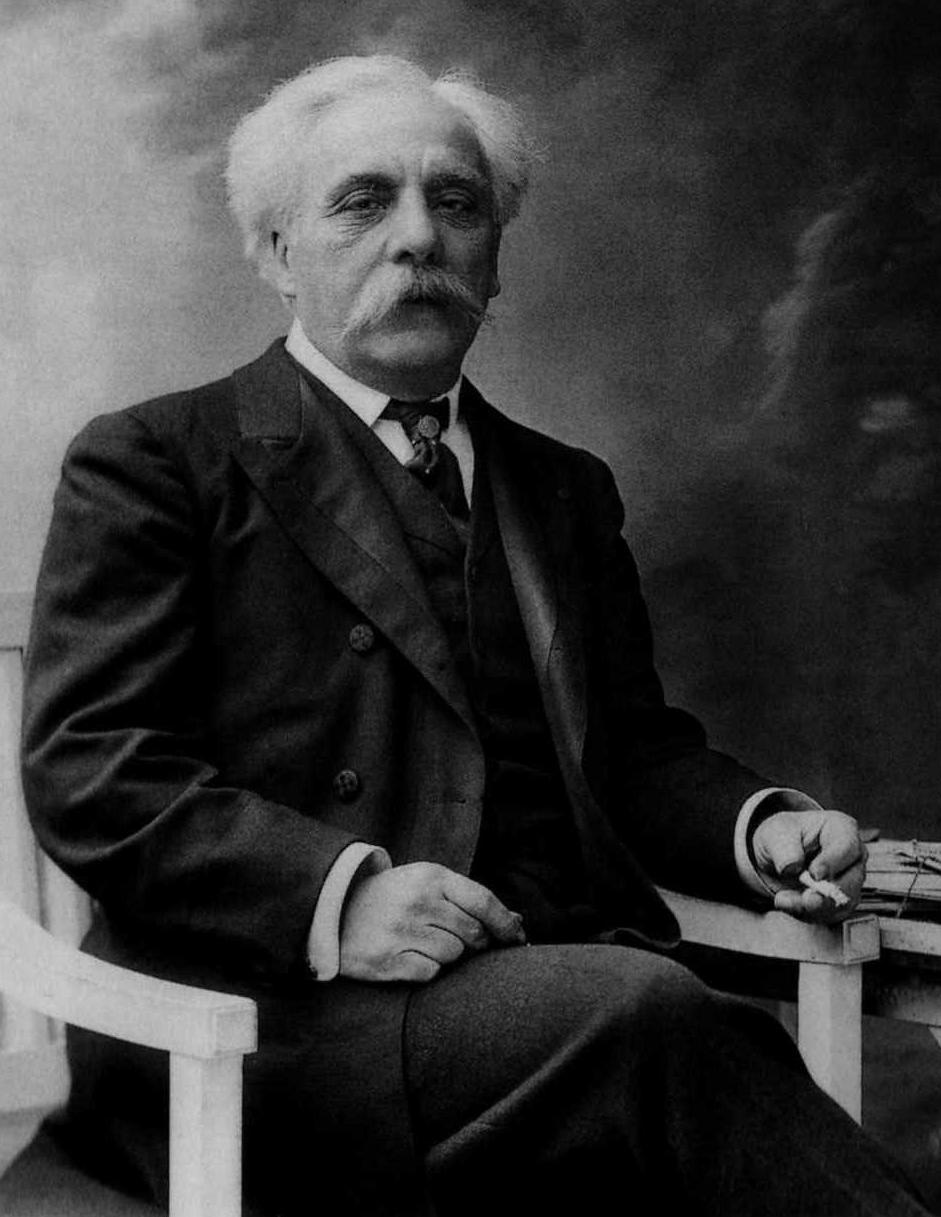
Gabriel Fauré in 1905, photographed by Félix Nadar

J. B. Steane reviewed the album on LP in Gramophone in March 1983, comparing it with other performances of Fauré's songs by Dame Janet Baker, Anne-Marie Rodde and Dame Maggie Teyte.

"Notre amour", he wrote, exemplified the "fine and seemingly spontaneous play of light and shade" that Frederica von Stade brought to the composer. In the song's first line, "Notre amour est chose légère", the love celebrated by Armande Silvestre's merry lass was "light as air", "lifted by a gauze of finest weave in the hands of the sylphs". "Notre amour est chose charmante", the mélodie continued, and the charm of that love was equalled by the singer's and the song's. Next, "Notre amour est chose sacrée", and von Stade darkened her tone to portray the poet's enigmatic forest where there seemed to be a message in the stillness. Lastly, "Notre amour est chose éternelle", and von Stade's voice rose in uninhibited joy eloquent of the rapture of the lover's soul.

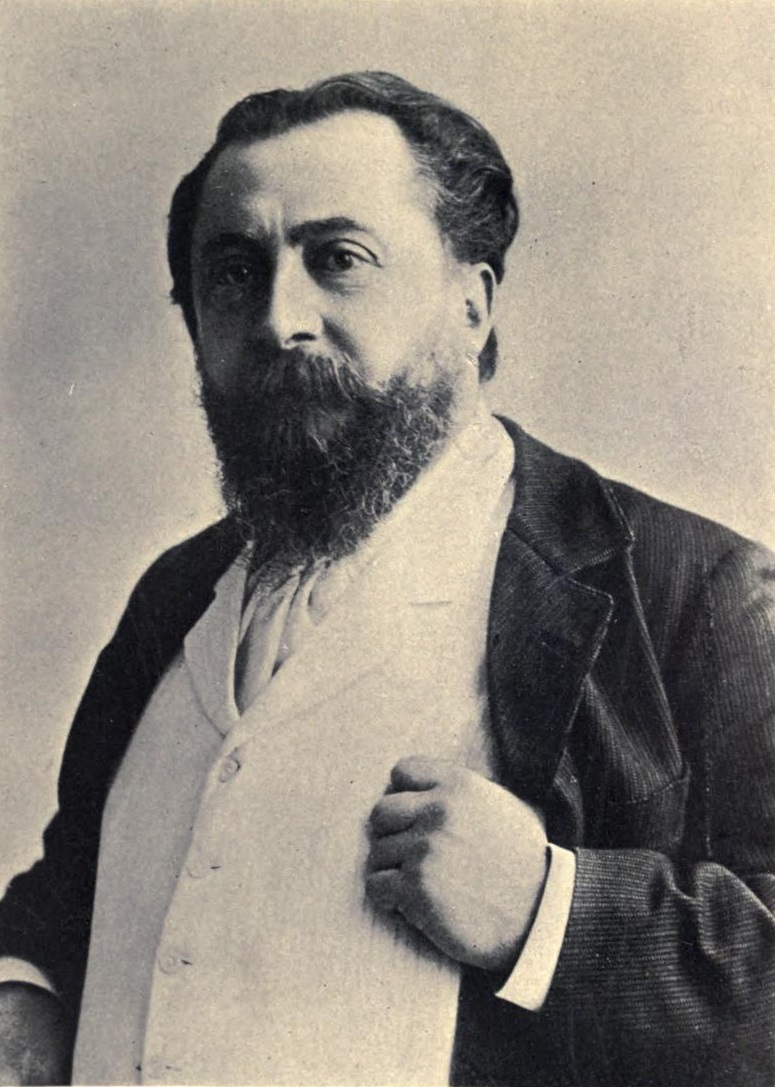
Catulle Mendès

Not every interpreter of the song had expressed its different feelings so successfully. Anne-Marie Rodde, with her "clear, young, very French tone", was a "delightful" performer of Fauré, but although her "amour" was passionately happy, it did not seem to "care a centime whether it was 'légère' or 'sacrée'." Janet Baker, usually an imaginative artist, made the song into a prosaic utterance comparatively devoid of charm.

Fauré's melodies were ideal material for von Stade, "falling easily within the loveliest part of the voice, gaining warmth of expression from that deeper note of wistfulness often latent in the tone." Her interpretations served Fauré's music with selfless fidelity. She did not subject his music to emphases that called unwelcome attention to themselves, but did inflect his seemingly simple melodic lines to acknowledge his songs' harmonies and the words of his poets. One was seldom conscious of artifice intruding into performances that mostly sounded instinctive.

Jean-Philippe Collard was for the most part a good partner at the keyboard. At times, his piano was too prominent, and there were moments - such as in the opening bars of "Clair de lune" - when his left hand sounded unduly heavier than his right. But in "Mandoline", his incisive playing gave "a delicious spring to the rhythms of the serenade", and in "Après un rêve", his accompaniment supported von Stade's voice like the softest of pillows beneath the head of the song's awakening sleeper.

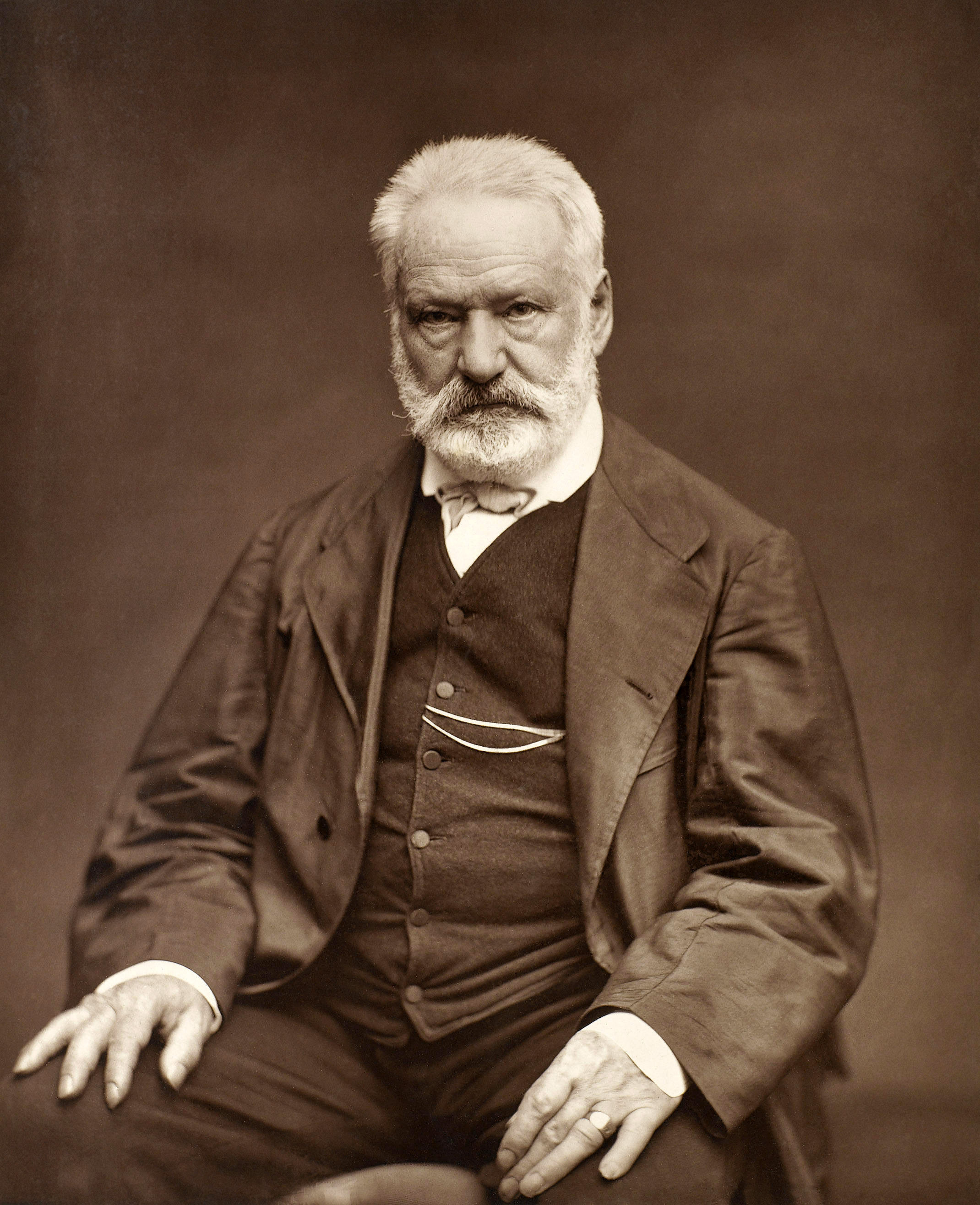
Victor Hugo in 1876, photographed by Étienne Carjat

Taken as a whole, the album's one arguable defect was that it was slower paced than some listeners might prefer (although in "Dans les ruines d'une abbaye", von Stade's reading had a greater momentum than the classic version sung by Maggie Teyte). EMI's engineers had recorded both voice and piano beautifully and balanced them judiciously. "The recital", Steane concluded, "provides a delightful selection of Fauré's songs, including some of the best known and others very rarely met. It presents this lovely singer at her best, and a composer who gives increasing pleasure as the years go by: chose charmante."

George Jellinek reviewed the album on LP in Stereo Review in October 1983. All of Gabriel Fauré's songs seemed simple on the surface, he wrote, especially those dating from the composer's early years, but hidden inside them was a world of rhythmic and harmonic sophistication. They were diverse in character and feeling. Some, like "Le papillon et la fleur", were virtually domestic salon pieces. Most, like "Après un rêve" or "Clair de lune", were memorable for their sensuality. A few, like "Prison" or "Au cimetière", were "startling with their muted passion or stark despair".

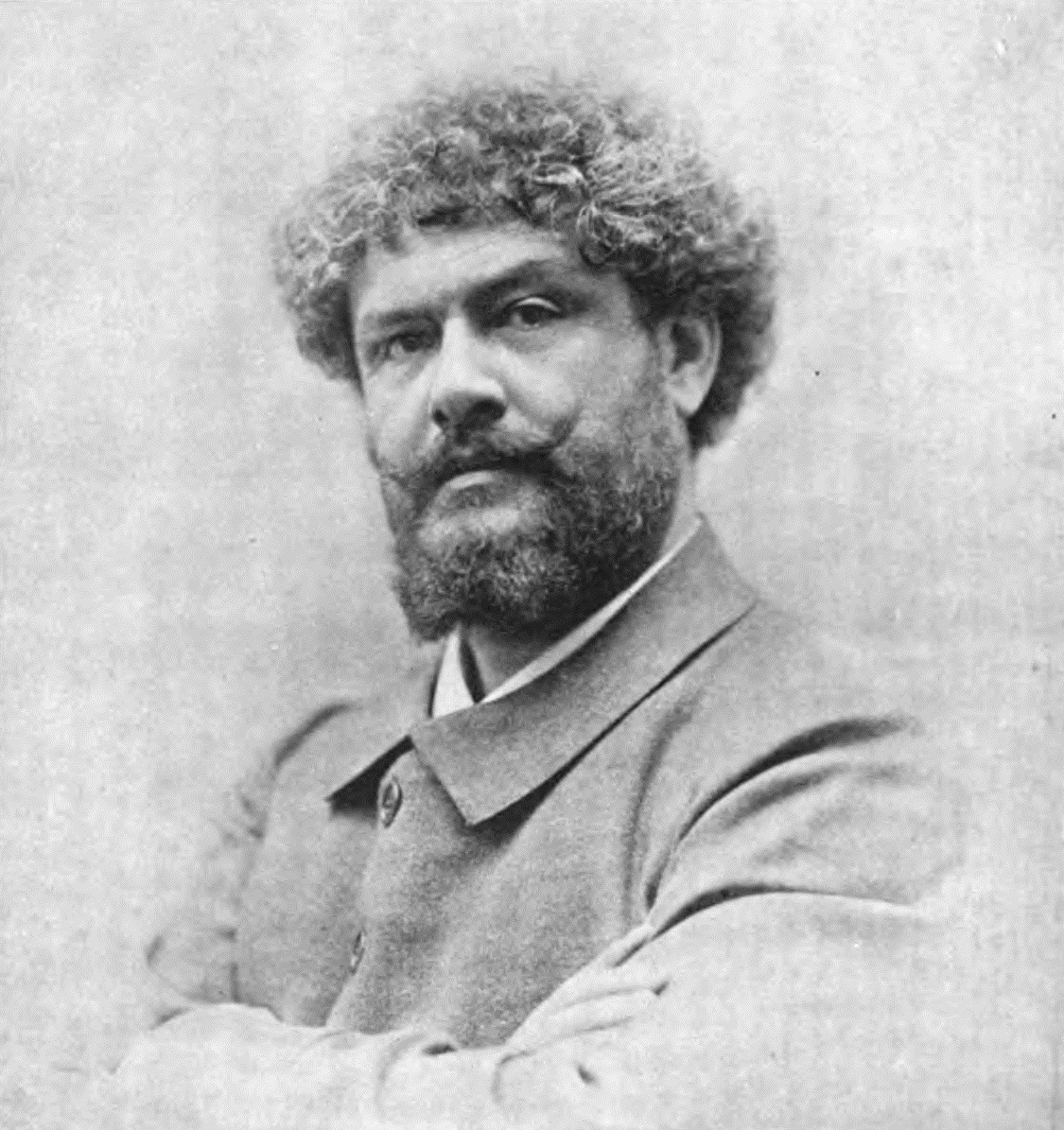
Jean Richepin

Frederica von Stade presented Faure's music with "a luscious tone that exploits the warmth of her mid-range and with a notable sensitivity to the poetic texts." Von Stade's singing had always been enjoyable, but some of her records had been marred by effects that sounded contrived. On her new disc, she had become a better artist then ever before. Her interpretations were now "straightforward, unmannered and, when the mood calls for it, convincingly exultant."

Jean-Philippe Collard's accompaniments were "firm and muscular", which was in accord with what Fauré would have wanted - he was a musician who preferred the clear light of classicism to the mists of transcendence. Sometimes, indeed, as in "Au bord de l'eau", he was probably sterner than was advisable, and von Stade was deprived of some of the freedom that she should have been permitted.

EMI's audio quality was excellent. The album was "a beautiful record" that was not just a treat but a prize.

The album was also discussed in The Complete Penguin Stereo Record and Cassette Guide, which praised von Stade as "a deeply persuasive interpreter of French mélodies", and in Fanfare, where her recital was described as "uptight and overblown".

=== Accolades ===
Under the title Fauré: Eighteen Songs, the album was nominated for at the 26th Annual Grammy Awards for the best classical vocal solo performance of 1983. Stereo Review judged the album to be the best recordings of the month, and J. B. Steane included the album in his 1983 Gramophone Critics' Choice list of the best recordings of the year.

== CD track listing ==
First version (EMI Records TOCE-13459)

All music is composed by Gabriel Fauré.

No.	Title	Lyrics	Length
1.	"Les berceaux (Op. 23, No. 1, 1879)"	Sully Prudhomme (1839-1907)	3:40
2.	"Le papillon et la fleur (Op. 1, No. 1, 1861)"	Victor Hugo (1802-1885)	2:17
3.	"Lydia (Op. 4, No. 2, circa 1870)"	Leconte de Lisle (1818-1894)	3:40
4.	"Rêve d'amour (Op. 5, No. 2, 1864)"	Victor Hugo	2:24
5.	"La fée aux chansons (Op. 27, No. 2, 1882)"	Armand Silvestre (1837-1901)	1:49
6.	"Au bord de l'eau (Op. 8, No. 1, 1875)"	Sully Prudhomme	2:03
7.	"Notre amour (Op. 23, No. 2, circa 1879)"	Armand Silvestre	1:58
8.	"Les roses d'Ispahan (Op. 39, No. 4, 1884)"	Leconte de Lisle	3:35
9.	"Dans les ruines d'une abbaye (Op. 2, No. 1, circa 1866)"	Victor Hugo	2:12
10.	"Après un rêve (Op. 7, No. 1, 1877)"	Romain Bussine (1830-1899)	3:50
11.	"Clair de lune (Op. 46, No. 2, 1887)"	Paul Verlaine (1844-1896)	3:16
12.	"Mandoline (from Cinq mélodies "de Venise", Op. 58, No. 1, 1891)"	Paul Verlaine	2:02
13.	"En sourdine (from Cinq mélodies "de Venise", Op. 58, No. 2, 1891)"	Paul Verlaine	4:02
14.	"L'aurore (circa 1870)"	Victor Hugo	1:40
15.	"Arpège (Op. 76, No. 2, 1897)"	Albert Samain (1858-1900)	2:44
16.	"Prison (Op. 83, No. 1, 1894)"	Paul Verlaine	3:00
17.	"Dans la forêt de septembre (Op. 85, No. 1, 1902)"	Catulle Mendès (1841-1909)	4:09
18.	"Au cimetière (Op. 51, No. 2, 1888)"	Jean Richepin (1849-1926)	5:28

Second version (EMI Records 50999-0-94425-2-8): bonus track

All music is composed by Gabriel Fauré.

No.	Title	Lyrics	Length
19.	"Chanson de Mélisande (from incidental music to Pelléas et Mélisande, Op. 80, 1898)"	J. W. Mackail, adapted from Maurice Maeterlinck	3:13

Songs are dated in this list according to the years in which they were composed, not the years in which they were first published.

== Personnel ==
=== Musical ===
- Frederica von Stade, mezzo-soprano
- Jean-Philippe Collard, piano
- Orchestre national du Capitole de Toulouse (second version only)
- Michel Plasson, conductor (second version only)

=== Other ===
- Eric Macleod, producer
- Serge Rémy, balance engineer

== Release history ==
In 1983, EMI and Angel released the first version of the album on LP (catalogue numbers ASD-4183 in Britain, DS-37893 in the US), with texts, translations and notes. The album was also issued on cassette (catalogue numbers TCC-ASD-4183 in Britain, 4XS-37893 in the US).

In 1987, EMI issued the first version of the album on CD as the fifth disc in their 5-CD compilation Fauré: Œuvres pour piano & Mélodies (catalogue number 50999-501759-2-5), with an 8-page booklet including notes by Adélaïde de Place. In 2007, EMI reissued the first version of the album on CD (catalogue number TOCE-13459) with a 28-page booklet including texts in French and notes and translations in Japanese. In 2011, EMI issued the second version of the album on CD (catalogue number 50999-0-94425-2-8) with an 8-page booklet lacking texts or translations but featuring notes by Jim Samson.
