= George Pieterson =

Dutch clarinetist

George Pieterson (5 March 1942, Amsterdam – 24 April 2016) was a Dutch clarinetist.

== Life and career ==
Pieterson suffered from asthma as a child, and began studies of clarinet at age 11 to try to counteract this condition. He studied clarinet with his uncle, Jos d'Hondt. As a teenager and student at the Amsterdams Muzieklyceum, Pieterson was a member of the Aulos Quintet, which included Martine Bakker (flute), Edo de Waart (oboe), Joep Terweij (bassoon) and Jaap Verhaar (French horn), under the guidance of Thom de Klerk. The Aulos Quintet later expanded into the Nederlands Blazers Ensemble (Netherlands Winds Ensemble), with Pieterson as a founding member. He joined the Radio Filharmonisch Orkest at the age of 18 in the second clarinet chair. He subsequently was first chair clarinet with Het Gelders Orkest, and later became principal clarinet of the Rotterdam Philharmonic Orchestra.

From 1975 to 2004, Pieterson was principal clarinet of the Royal Concertgebouw Orchestra in Amsterdam. He played on a Wurlitzer Reform-Boehm clarinet. In 1977, Reinbert de Leeuw, Vera Beths, Anner Bijlsma and Pieterson formed the Rondom Quartet, and the group recorded Messiaen's Quatour pour la fin du temps (Philips). Other commercial recordings included, for Philips, the clarinet sonatas of Brahms, the Mozart clarinet quintet (with violinist Arthur Grumiaux and others) and clarinet trios by Beethoven and Brahms, and also the clarinet concerto of Paul Hindemith for EtCetera.

His work with contemporary music included the composition of a clarinet concerto for him by Theo Loevendie. Ill health, including muscular dystrophy, cancer and depression led to his retirement from the orchestra. He was a collector of historical clarinets, with his collection numbering about 40.

== Discography ==
- Frederica von Stade sings Mozart & Rossini Arias, with the Rotterdam Philharmonic Orchestra, conducted by Edo de Waart, Philips, 1976
