= French Opera Arias =

- Columbia LP, M 34206

Studio album by Frederica von Stade
- Released: 1976
- Studio: Henry Wood Hall, London
- Genre: Opera and classical orchestral
- Length: 51:33
- Language: French
- Label: Columbia
- Producer: Paul Walter Myers

French Opera Arias
- Sony CD, SMK-60527

French Opera Arias is a 51-minute studio album of music performed by Frederica von Stade and the London Philharmonic Orchestra under the direction of John Pritchard. It was released in 1976.

== Recording ==
The album was recorded using analogue technology on 4, 8 and 10 January 1976 in the Henry Wood Hall, London.

== Cover art ==
The LP version of the album, designed under the art direction of Allen Weinberg, features a photograph of von Stade by Clive Barda on the front of the sleeve and an image of Paris's Palais Garnier on the back. The cover of the CD version features a photograph of von Stade by Valerie Clement.

== Critical reception ==
=== Reviews ===
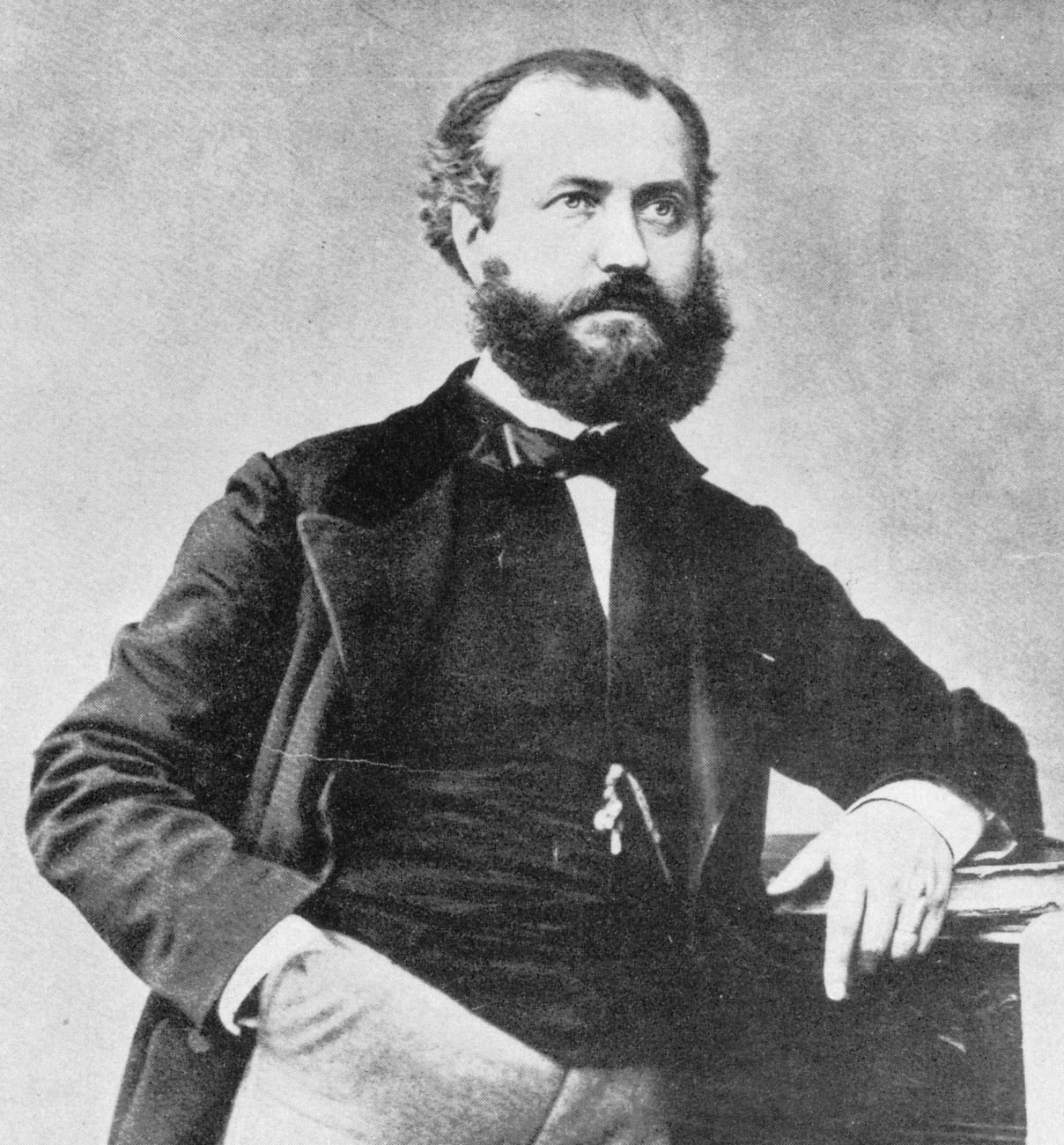
Charles Gounod in 1859

J. B. Steane reviewed the album on LP in Gramophone in July 1976. Frederica von Stade, he wrote, was one of an elite group of artists about whom critics never seemed to say a negative word. "The problem is simply how to convey her excellence in temperate language". It had been a long time since he had heard a debut solo recital disc as thrilling as her French anthology. It was likely to "take its place among that select number of solo operatic recitals on record that are to be cherished, learnt by heart, and used as a touchstone."

Some singers who called themselves mezzo-sopranos were actually just sopranos with missing top notes, or contraltos singing higher than was natural for them. Von Stade was not one of these interlopers. Her upper register was comfortable and strong, and her lower had "depth and richness" without anything "plummy or chesty" about it. Her timbre was youthful, and unmarred by vibrato, shrillness or any tendency to spread at moments of stress. Her technical skill was remarkable. Whether singing above the stave or below, whether singing crescendo or decrescendo, her tone retained its evenness. She negotiated trills, triplets, leaps and staccato notes with clean, tidy precision. Her breath control allowed her to shape her phrases more than satisfactorily. And "her style is charming, aristocratic and imaginative, her diction clear, her expression vivid and sensitive."

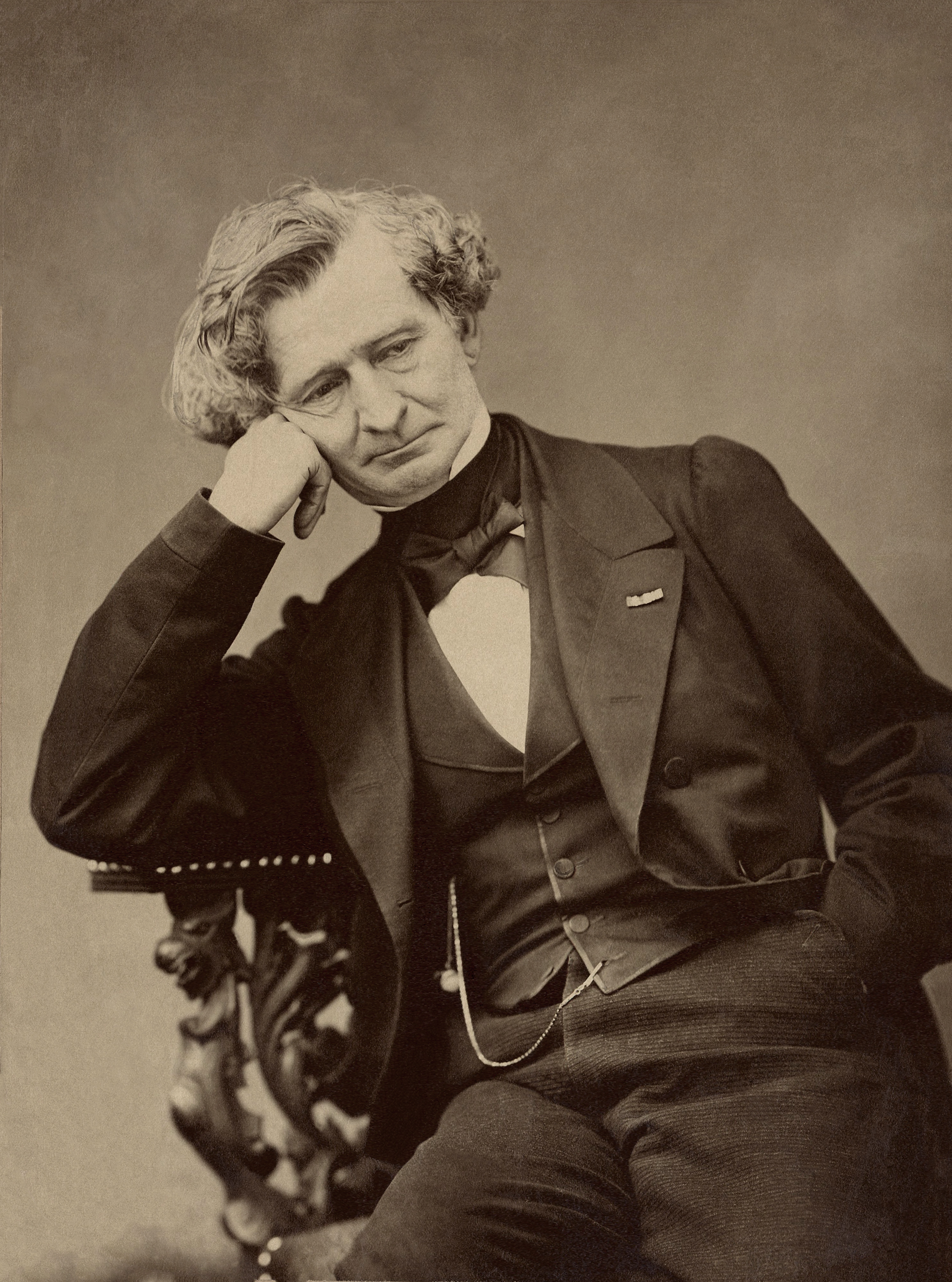
Hector Berlioz, photographed by Pierre Petit in 1863

The first few bars of the album were enough to demonstrate von Stade's quality. The "nobles seigneurs" of Les Huguenots would be impressed indeed by a salutation like hers, "so firm in enunciation and so brilliant in courtly flourishes". For once, the aria's repetitions of "no, no, no" did not seem pert or ridiculous, and its waltz went with a refined, appealing lilt. "Depuis hier je cherche en vain" from Roméo et Juliette was a rather similar piece, another aria from a charmer of a page boy, strikingly different from the Berlioz item that followed it. "Dieu! Que viens-je d'entendre?" from Beatrice et Bénédict was sung with "serious tenderness and urgency", and was just as affecting as the better known Berlioz aria on the B side of the record, Marguerite's Romance from La damnation de Faust. "Both are sung with admirable sensitivity to the changing feelings, as well as with ravishing tone."

In the woe of "Va! Laisse couler mes larmes" from Werther, von Stade found the happy mean between inflecting her line with too little emotion and allowing feeling to disfigure it. The aria exemplified her tasteful deployment of portamento. As Mignon and Cendrillon, she seemed to become the roles that she was assuming. Her reading of "Connais-tu le pays" was as beautiful as Lucrezia Bori's, and it was impossible to imagine that even the first Lucette, Julia Guiraudon, could have made a more spellbinding scene out of Cinderella's wondering whether her Fairy Godmother would deal with her mercifully. And then there were two jeux d'esprit from Offenbach to end matters with a smile: "the Périchole swaying dangerously with her champagne and spilling never a drop, the Grande-Duchesse going about her indiscretions with irresistible style."

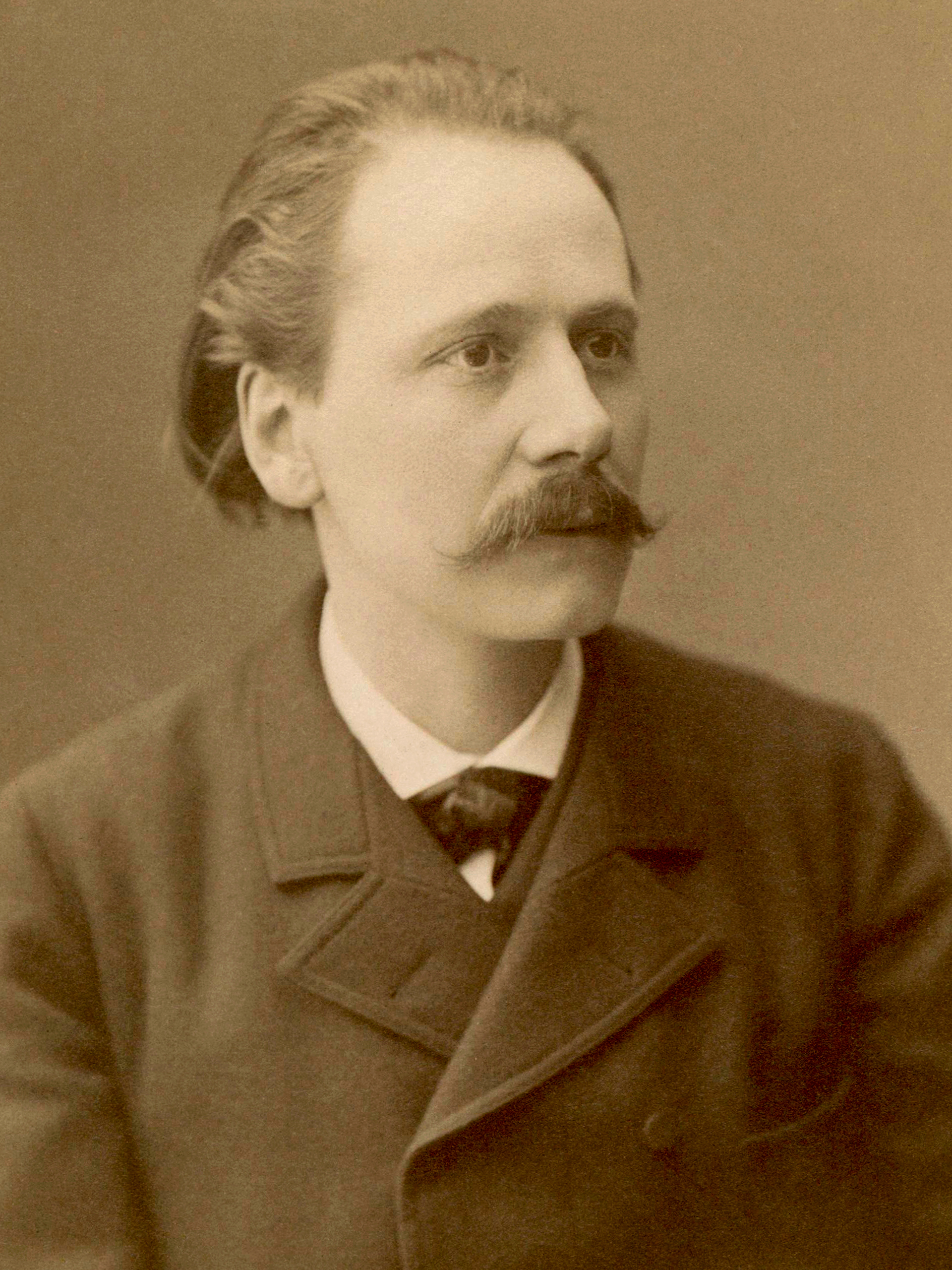
Jules Massenet, photographed by Eugène Pirou

In sum, the album was simply perfect. The London Philharmonic Orchestra were in especially good form under John Pritchard, and Columbia's engineers had provided an audio quality that was bright, but not unpleasantly so. "No doubt everybody in the studio responded to something in the enchantment of the singer's art."

Steane revisited the album in Gramophone in October 1976. It "endears itself further with every playing", he wrote. Von Stade had a miraculously firm grasp of her composers' different styles, portraying the Grande-Duchesse de Gérolstein in absolute accord with Offenbach's idiom and "achieving a fine intensity of passion and grief in 'D'amour l'ardente flamme'."

George Jellinek reviewed the album on LP in Stereo Review in February 1977. It was phenomenal, he wrote, how Frederica von Stade had gone from the Metropolitan Opera auditions to global stardom in a mere seven years, despite rationing her public appearances and limiting herself to a relatively narrow repertoire. In part, this was because of her "good looks and winning stage presence", but it was mainly the result of the excellence of her work. Like Teresa Berganza, she had begun her recording career when already "a mature artist, blessed with innate musicianship and sensitivity as well as undeniable flair".

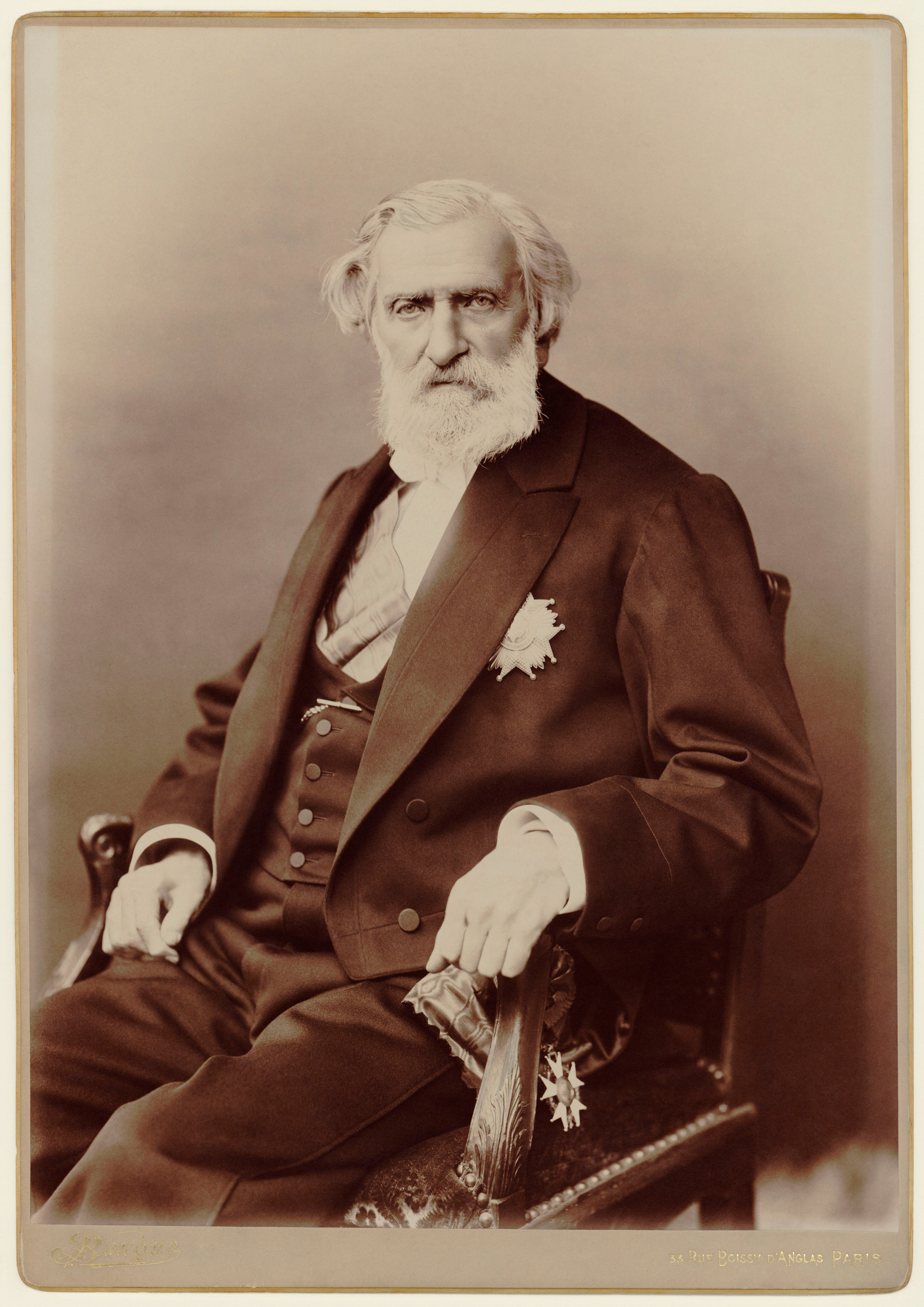
Ambroise Thomas, photographed by Wilhelm Benque in circa 1895

Von Stade's voice was "a bright mezzo, fresh and lovely in tone quality", for the time being more powerful at the upper end of her range than further down. She had no difficulty in rising to a high C. Her lucid diction made French music a good choice for her, and her interpretation of all the items on her album was well nigh impeccable.

Marguerite's dismay, Mignon's yearning, Urbain's aristocratic playfulness and the sentiments of two of Offenbach's leading ladies were all conveyed with equal success. Beatrice's aria too, while not the most dramatic piece that Berlioz ever wrote, was put across with "fine shading and expressivity".

The London Philharmonic Orchestra played beautifully, although John Pritchard's tempos were perhaps sometimes a little too relaxed. Columbia's audio quality was "ideally balanced [and] rich". Von Stade and her producer deserved to be applauded for devising such an "refreshingly imaginative programme".

Music Magazine reported that the album was "a bestseller and elicited enthusiastic response internationally". According to an unnamed reporter profiling von Stade for Time on 13 December 1976, the album showcased "a lustrous amber mezzo-soprano voice with an unusually sweet crystalline top and seemingly effortless agility".

David Shengold mentioned the album in Opera News in December 2016, reviewing a box set of von Stade's Columbia CDs in which it had been reissued. He thought that "the elegant French Opera Arias with John Pritchard" was a "must-have": "even Gounod's Stéphano sounds stellar".

=== Accolades ===
The album was awarded a Grand Prix du Disque in 1976, and first prize in the High Fidelity/International Record Critics Awards of 1977. Stereo Review rated the album as one of the best of the month, and J. B. Steane included the album in his 1976 Gramophone Critics' Choice list of the best recordings of the year.

== CD track listing ==
Giacomo Meyerbeer (1791-1864)

Les Huguenots (Paris, 1836), with a libretto by Eugène Scribe (1791-1861) and Émile Deschamps (1791-1871)

- 1 (4:53) "Nobles seigneurs, salut!" (aria for Urbain)

Charles Gounod (1818-1893)

Roméo et Juliette (Paris, 1867), with a libretto by Jules Barbier (1825-1901) and Michel Carré (1821-1872) after Romeo and Juliet by William Shakespeare (1564-1616)

- 2 (5:17) "Depuis hier je cherche en vain" (aria for Stéphano)

Hector Berlioz (1803-1869)

Béatrice et Bénédict (Baden-Baden, 1862), with a libretto by Berlioz after Much Ado About Nothing by William Shakespeare

- 3 (10:33) "Dieu! Que viens-je d'entendre...Il m'en souvient" (aria for Béatrice)

Jules Massenet (1842-1912)

Werther (Geneva, 1892), with a libretto by Édouard Blau (1836-1906), Paul Milliet (1848-1924) and Georges Hartmann (1843-1900) (writing as Henri Grémont) after Die Leiden des jungen Werthers ("The Sorrows of Young Werther", 1774) by Johann Wolfgang von Goethe (1749-1832)

- 4 (3:06) "Va! Laisse couler mes larmes" (aria for Charlotte)

Jacques Offenbach (1819-1880)

La Périchole ("The Peruvienne", Paris, 1868), with a libretto by Henri Meilhac (1830-1897) and Ludovic Halévy (1834-1908) after Le carrosse de Saint-Sacrement (1829) by Prosper Mérimée (1803-1871)

- 5 (2:08) "Ah! Quel dîner je viens de faire" (aria for the Périchole)

Jules Massenet

Cendrillon ("Cinderella", Paris, 1899), with a libretto by Henri Caïn (1857-1937) after Cendrillon (1698) by Charles Perrault (1628-1703)

- 6 (6:26) "Enfin, je suis ici" (aria for Lucette)

Hector Berlioz

La damnation de Faust (Paris, 1846), with a libretto by Berlioz and Almire Gandonnière (1814-1863) after a translation by Gérard de Nerval (1808-1855) of Faust, eine Tragödie ("Faust, a tragedy", 1808) by Johann Wolfgang von Goethe

- 7 (10:18) "D'amour l'ardente flamme" (Romance for Marguerite)

Ambroise Thomas (1811-1896)

Mignon (Paris. 1866), with a libretto by Jules Barbier and Michel Carré after Wilhelm Meisters Lehrjahre ("Wilhelm Meister's Apprenticeship", 1795-1796) by Johann Wolfgang von Goethe

- 8 (5:33) "Connais-tu le pays" (aria for Mignon)

Jacques Offenbach

La Grande-Duchesse de Gérolstein (Paris, 1867), with a libretto by Henri Meilhac and Ludovic Halévy

- 9 (3:16) "Dites-lui qu'on l'a remarqué" (aria for the Grande-Duchesse)

== Personnel ==
=== Musical ===
- Frederica von Stade (b. 1945), mezzo-soprano
- London Philharmonic Orchestra
- John Pritchard (1918-1989), conductor

=== Other ===
- Paul Walter Myers (1932-2015), producer
- Robert Auger, engineer

== Release history ==
On 4 October 1976, Columbia released the album on LP (catalogue numbers M-76522 in Britain, M-34206 in the US) with an insert with notes, texts and translations. The album was also issued on cassette (catalogue number 40-76522 in Britain).

In 1998, Sony issued the album on CD (catalogue number SMK-60527) with a 20-page booklet including texts and translations and a memoir by von Stade recalling how her recording was made. In 2012, Sony reissued the album on CD in their 2-CD collection Frederica von Stade: Musique Française (catalogue number 88691932202). In 2016, Sony again reissued the album on CD (in a miniature replica of the sleeve of the original LP) with a 52-page booklet in their 18-CD collection Frederica von Stade: The Complete Columbia Recital Albums (catalogue number 88875183412).

== Note ==
Strictly speaking, this album's aria from La damnation de Faust should not be described as operatic. Although Berlioz's work has been adapted for the stage, he intended his légende dramatique for the concert hall, not the theatre.
