= Mozart Mass K. 139 (Claudio Abbado recording) =

- Deutsche Grammophon LP: 2530 777

Studio album by Claudio Abbado
- Released: 1976
- Studio: Grosser Saal, Musikverein, Vienna
- Genre: Classical
- Length: 45:12
- Language: Latin
- Label: Deutsche Grammophon
- Producer: Rainer Brock

Mozart Mass K. 139
- Deutsche Grammophon CD: 427 255-2

Mozart Mass K. 139 is a 45-minute classical studio album on which Mozart's Waisenhaus-Messe is performed by Gundula Janowitz. Frederica von Stade, Wiesław Ochman, Kurt Moll, the Chorus of the Vienna State Opera and the Vienna Philharmonic Orchestra under the direction of Claudio Abbado. It was released in 1976.

== Recording ==
The album was recorded using analogue technology in October 1975 in the Grosser Saal (main auditorium) of the Musikverein, Vienna.

== Packaging ==
The cover of the LP release of the album features a photograph of Abbado. The cover of the CD release, designed under the art direction of Hartmut Pfeiffer, features Norbert Attard's painting "Mihrab XIV", courtesy of CCA Galleries.

== Critical response ==
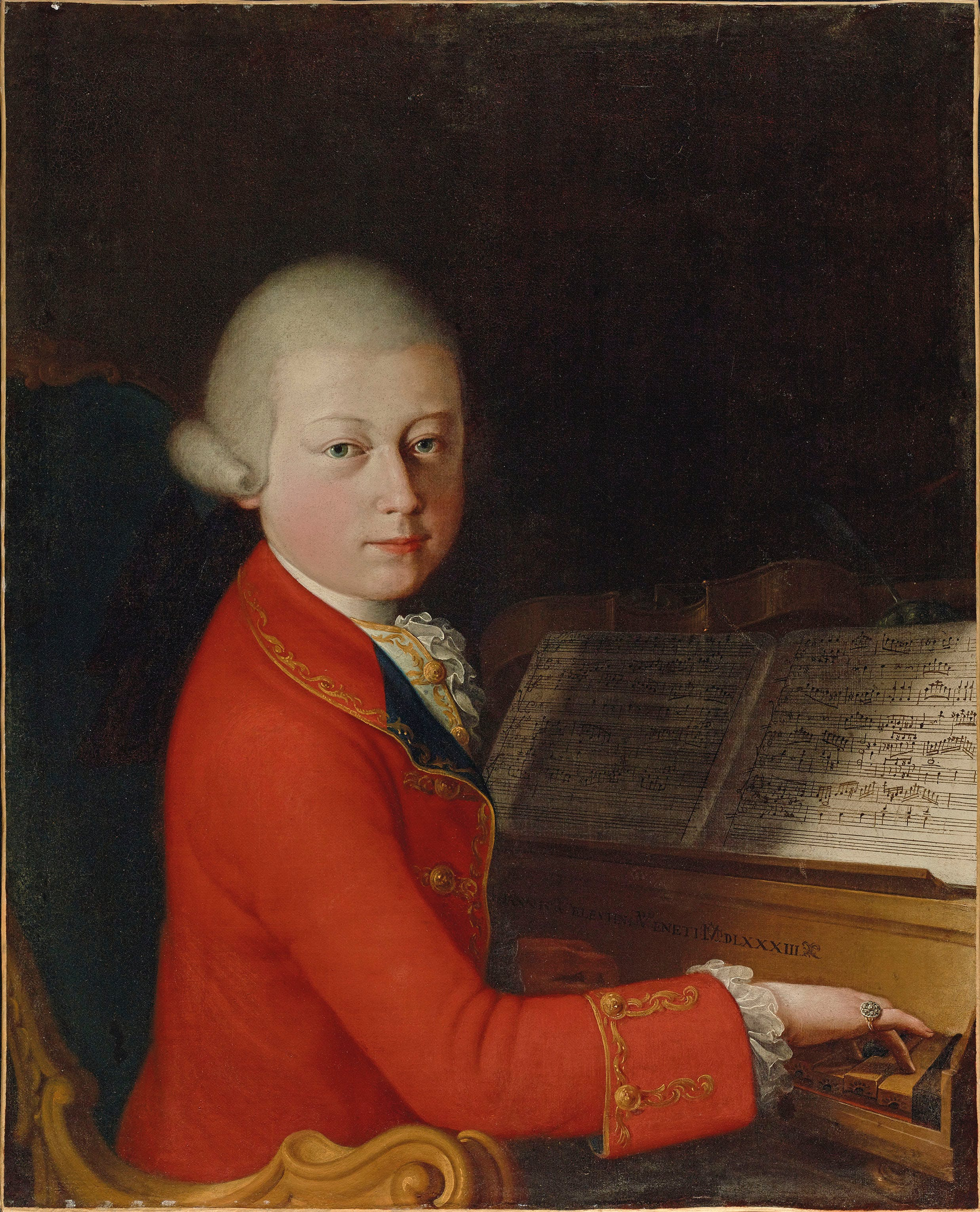
Mozart, aged fifteen, at Melk Abbey in 1771, three years after K. 139 was composed

The musicologist Stanley Sadie reviewed the album on LP in Gramophone in March 1977, comparing it with a recent alternative conducted by Herbert Kegel. He began by reminding his readers that if current scholarship was to be believed, Mozart had written his festive, mostly C major, trumpet-and-drum flavoured Waisenhaus-Messe when he was only twelve years old. Yes, there was music in it that betrayed its composer's immaturity - "naïveties", "clumsy things", passages that were echoes of ideas that Mozart could have picked up in Salzburg or Vienna. But there were, too, "movements fully and resourcefully worked out". In what Abbado had done with this piece of juvenilia, there was more to celebrate than to criticize. Gundula Janowitz was in "lovely, pure, limpid voice", showing no signs of difficulty except at the taxing beginning of the 'Resurrexit'. Wiesław Ochman used his "pleasant, slightly reedy voice" satisfactorily. Kurt Moll gave no cause for complaint either, except that his bass was weightier than ideal when duetting with his tenor colleague. The Chorus's contribution was meticulous, and the Vienna Philharmonic crystalline. The only charges that could be laid at Abbado's door were some mannered piano moments in the Kyrie and the Credo. With excellent engineering by Deutsche Grammophon's production team, Abbado's disc was better than Kegel's in virtually every respect.

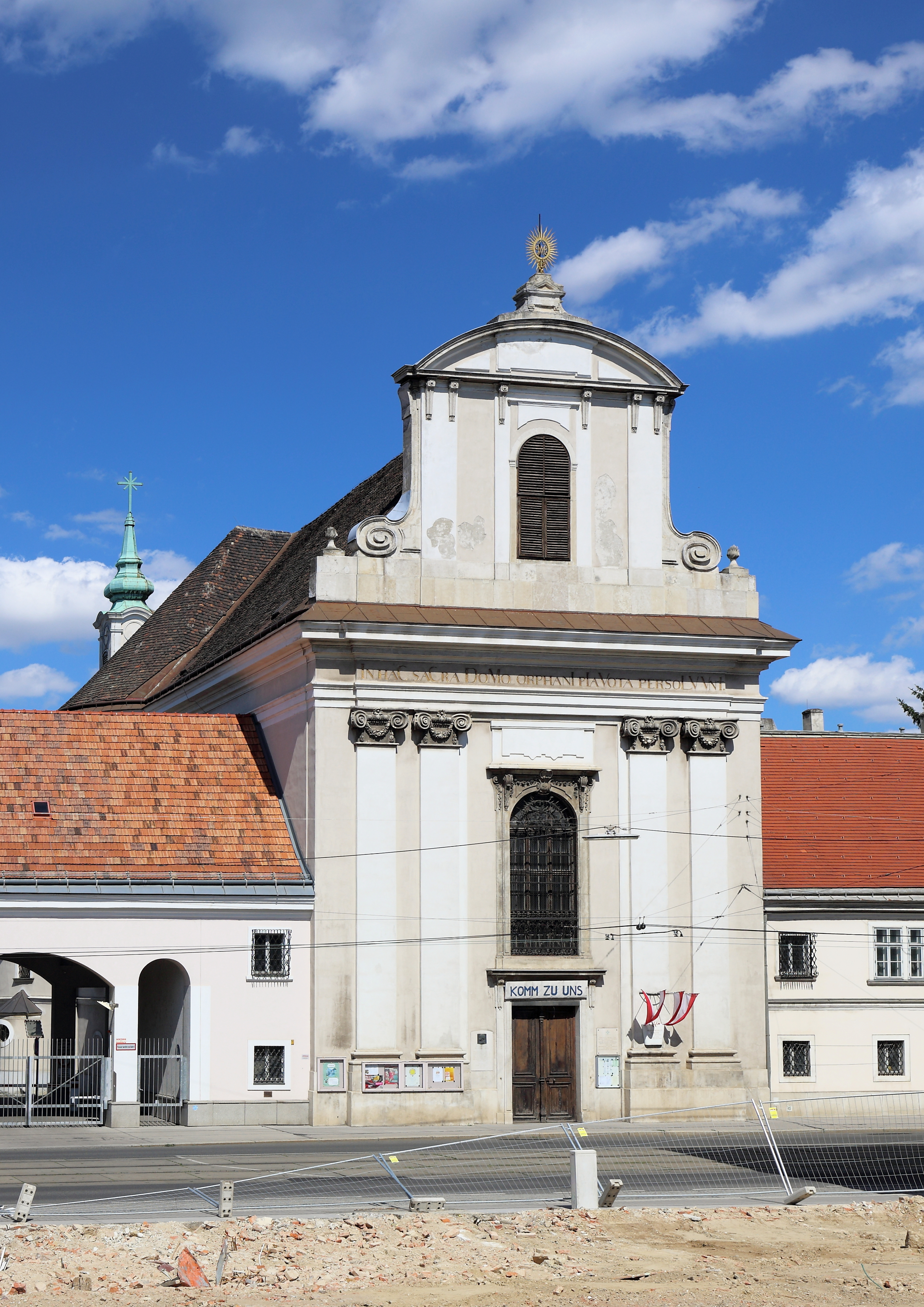
The Waisenhauskirche (Orphanage Church) in Vienna. Mozart wrote K. 139 for the service at which the church was consecrated in the presence of the imperial court

Sadie revisited the album on CD in Gramophone in August 1989, comparing it with a new version of the Mass conducted by Marcus Creed. Abbado's disc, he wrote, had "superlative women soloists - Gundula Janowitz at her sweetest and most graceful, Frederica von Stade warm and musicianly as always". But his opinion of Abbado's tenor and bass was slightly harsher than when he had critiqued them on vinyl. Wiesław Ochman was now judged to be lacking in charm and no better than adequate, and Kurt Moll was "rather heavy and clumsy". The Vienna State Opera Chorus was still "precise and well-focused", however. Abbado's conducting had both good points and bad. He elicited a performance that was lively, lucid, polished and nicely phrased, and he was skilled at managing those parts of the score where the 12-year-old Mozart's ideas were least coherent. On the downside, his tempi were sometimes slower than the music called for, and he treated Mozart's less solemn passages too gravely. As for Creed's newer recording, it was true that his line-up of soloists was not as starry as Deutsche Grammophon's. But Celia Linsley, if not blessed with Janowitz's tonal beauty, sang with grace and charm; Werner Hollweg summoned up intensity when required; and Walton Grönroos seemed more at home in the Mass's idiom than Moll did. Although Creed's performance was not as glossy as Abbado's, his sprightlier conducting and Capriccio's inclusion of some worthwhile fill-up items made his disc marginally the more enticing.

== CD track listing ==
Wolfgang Amadeus Mozart (1756–1791)

Missa solemnis in C minor, K. 139 (47a), Waisenhaus-Messe (Vienna, 1768)

I Kyrie, Adagio

- 1 (1:51) Kyrie eleison
- 2 (2:32) Kyrie eleison
- 3 (1:38) Christe eleison
- 4 (2:33) Kyrie eleison

II Gloria, Allegro

- 5 (1:01) Gloria in excelsis Deo
- 6 (1:49) Laudamus te
- 7 (1:05) Gratias agimus
- 8 (2:02) Domine Deus
- 9 (1:54) Qui tollis peccata mundi
- 10 (2:49) Quoniam tu solus Sanctus
- 11 (2:39) Cum Sancto Spiritu

III Credo, Allegro

- 12 (2:17) Credo in unum Deum
- 13 (2:40) Et incarnatus est
- 14 (1:43) Crucifixus est pro nobis
- 15 (1:28) Et resurrexit
- 16 (2:02) Et in Spiritum Sanctum
- 17 (3:18) Et in unum sanctam

IV Sanctus, Adagio

- 18 (0:56) Sanctus, Sanctus, Sanctus Dominus
- 19 (0:50) Pleni sunt coeli... Osanna in excelsis
- 20 (1:57) Benedictus
- 21 (0:20) Osanna in excelsis

V Agnus Dei, Andante

- 22 (3:45) Agnus Dei, qui tollis peccata mundi
- 23 (1:49) Dona nobis pacem

== Personnel ==
=== Musical ===
- Gundula Janowitz, soprano
- Frederica von Stade, mezzo-soprano
- Wiesław Ochman, tenor
- Kurt Moll (1938–2017), bass
- Rudolf Scholz, organ
- Choir of the Vienna State Opera (chorus master: Norbert Balatsch)
- Vienna Philharmonic Orchestra
- Claudio Abbado (1933–2014), conductor

=== Other ===
- Rainer Brock, producer
- Günter Hermanns, balance engineer

== Release history ==
In 1976, Deutsche Grammophon released the album on LP (catalogue number 2530 777) with notes and an insert providing the text of the Mass and translations.

In 1989, Deutsche Grammophon issued the album on CD (catalogue number 427 255–2) in their Galleria collection, with a 20-page insert booklet providing the text of the Mass in Latin, German, English and French, and with notes by Theophil Antonicek in English, French, German, Italian and Spanish.
