= Paul Walter Myers =

English record producer and writer

Paul Walter Myers (17 July 1932 – 1 May 2015) was a classical record producer who worked for CBS, Decca Records and Naxos. He worked with conductor George Szell of the Cleveland Orchestra, the pianist Glenn Gould, and the guitarist John Williams. Myers was the author of the "Deadly" series of mystery novels set in the world of classical music.

== Selected publications ==
- Deadly Variations. 1985.
- Deadly Cadenza. 1986.
- Deadly Aria. 1987.
- Deadly Sonata. 1987.
- Deadly Score. 1988.
- Deadly Crescendo. 1989.
- Concerto. Century, London, 1993. ISBN 9780712639545
- Leonard Bernstein. Phaidon Press, London, 1998. ISBN 9780714837017

== Discography ==
- French Opera Arias, with Frederica von Stade and the London Philharmonic Orchestra, conducted by John Pritchard, Columbia, 1976
- Song Recital, with Frederica von Stade and Martin Katz, Columbia, 1978
- Jules Massenet: Cendrillon, with Elizabeth Bainbridge, Jules Bastin, Jane Berbié, Teresa Cahill, Nicolai Gedda, Frederica von Stade, Ruth Welting, the Ambrosian Opera Chorus and the Philharmonia Orchestra, conducted by Julius Rudel, Columbia, 1979
- Italian Opera Arias, with Frederica von Stade, Janice Taylor and the National Arts Centre Orchestra, conducted by Mario Bernardi, Columbia, 1979
