= Italian Opera Arias =

1979 album by Frederica von Stade

- Columbia LP, M 35138

Studio album by Frederica von Stade
- Released: 1979
- Studio: National Arts Centre, Ottawa
- Genre: Opera
- Length: 51:08
- Language: Italian
- Label: Columbia
- Producer: Paul Walter Myers

Italian Opera Arias is a studio album of music by Frederica von Stade, Janice Taylor and the National Arts Centre Orchestra under the direction of Mario Bernardi. It was released in 1979.

== Recording ==
The album was recorded using analogue technology in August 1977 and July 1978 in the National Arts Centre, Ottawa, Ontario, Canada., following a performance of some of its programme by von Stade, Taylor, the NAC Orchestra and Bernardi on the last evening of the 1977 Festival Canada. It was at von Stade's request that Columbia selected the NAC Orchestra to accompany her.

== Cover art ==
The cover of the album was designed by Henrietta Condak, and features a photograph of von Stade taken by Valerie Clement.

== Critical reception ==
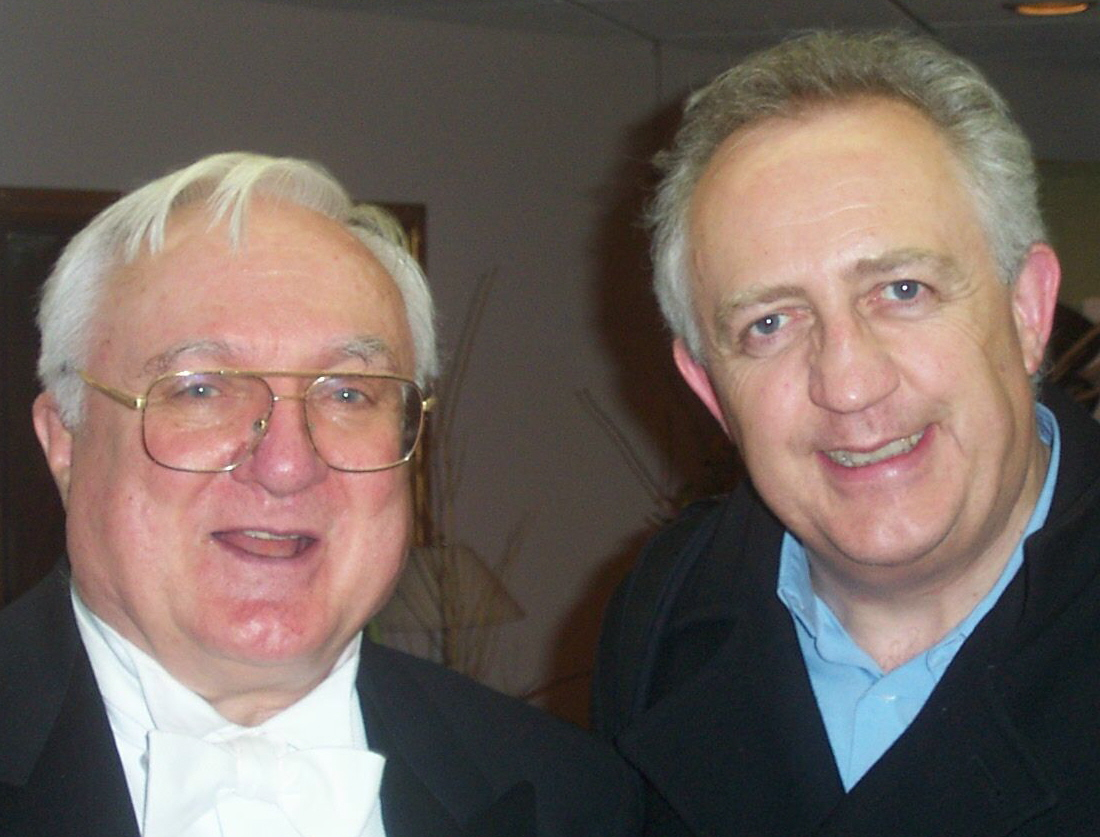
Mario Bernardi (left) with another conductor, Bramwell Tovey, in 2005

Alan Blyth reviewed the album on LP in Gramophone in January 1980. Readers who were regular visitors to Glyndebourne, he wrote, would already be familiar with Frederica von Stade's portrayal of Penelope, the lonely, sorrowing queen of Ithaca in Monteverdi's Il ritorno d'Ulisse in patria. In her arioso and recitative "Torna, torna", she was "deeply moved [and] deeply moving" as she pleaded for her husband to come back to her after his long absence in the Greeks' war against the Trojans. Monteverdi's genius, von Stade's artistry and the able support of Janice Taylor as Ericlea combined to paint a picture that captured the very essence of romantic devotion, even if the music was performed in the "fanciful" edition confected by Raymond Leppard. "Di tanti palpiti" from Rossini's Tancredi (sung complete with its introductory recitative) was delivered with "appropriately upright, masculine tones" and a confident grasp of Rossini's melodic idiom. It was the composer's fault, not von Stade's, that what was meant to be an aria of lament sounded incongruously cheerful. "Il mio ben quando verrà" from Paisiello's Nina widened the recital's emotional range with tenderness and charm. Accompanied by some pretty woodwind playing, von Stade sang it with "all her most shapely phrasing and mellow tone". "Bel raggio", from Rossini's Semiramide, was the album's only disappointment. Von Stade infused it with passion, but the aria's fioriture and other vocal challenges were too difficult for her to negotiate without some moments of audible discomfort. "L'Ombra fedele, anch'io" from Broschi's Idaspe was an aria that many listeners would probably never have come across before. Written for the composer's brother, the famous castrato Farinelli, it was "an insinuating piece with a kind of trumpet obbligato, and many repeated notes, in Handelian vein". Von Stade dispatched it "with élan, finding just the right castrato timbre for its grave utterance of another faithful soul".

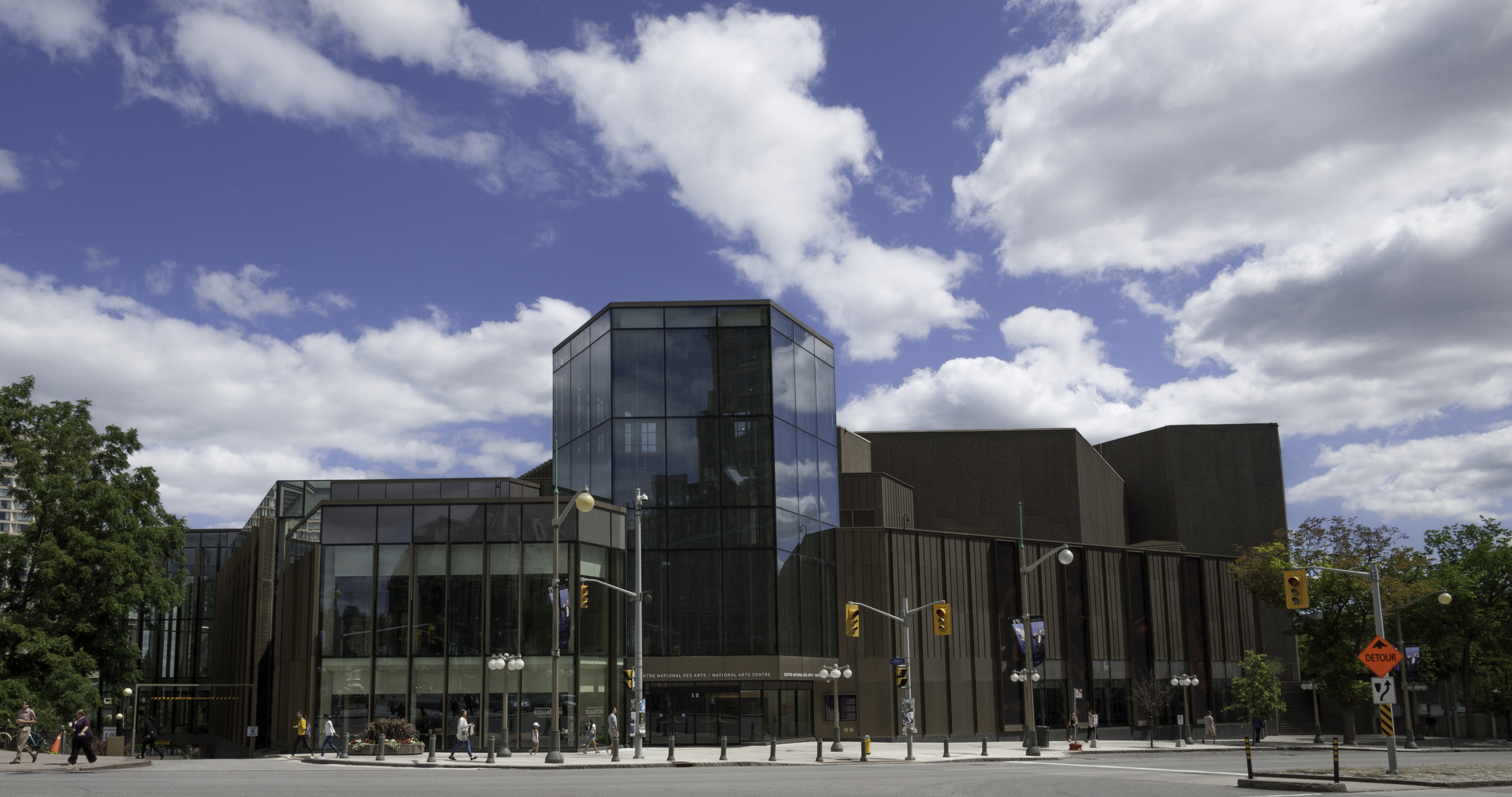
The National Arts Centre, Ottawa, Ontario, Canada

"È destin" from La Bohème - Leoncavallo's little known setting of the story, not the famous Puccini version - concluded the recital with a venture into a territory peripheral to von Stade's repertoire, nineteenth-century verismo. Despite Musetta's heartbroken outpourings being very unlike her usual material, she expressed them with unqualified success. The playing of the National Arts Centre Orchestra and Mario Bernardi's "alert and refined conducting" were both beyond reproach, as was CBS's audio quality, which had "more forward presence" than most of the company's output. The album's heterogeneity of styles meant that its transitions between tracks could be jarring, but the disc demonstrated von Stade's ability to project many different kinds of music and character with equal conviction. In sum, the album was "another desirable record" from an "attractive, thoughtful" singer who "never makes a bad one".

The album was also reviewed in the 1982 edition of The new Penguin stereo record and cassette guide.

== CD track listing ==
Claudio Monteverdi (1567–1643), in a realization by Raymond Leppard

- 1 (13:06) "Di misera regina...Torna, torna" from Il ritorno d'Ulisse in patria, with Janice Taylor as Ericlea

Gioachino Rossini (1792–1868), in a realization by Randolph Mickelson

- 2 (7:31) "O patria...Di tanti palpiti" from Tancredi

Giovanni Paisiello (1740–1816), in a realization by Randolph Mickelson

- 3 (8:26) "Il mio ben quando verrà" from Nina, o sia La pazza per amore

Gioachino Rossini, in a realization by Randolph Mickelson

- 4 (7:04) "Bel raggio lusinghier" from Semiramide

Riccardo Broschi (circa 1698–1756), in a realization by Randolph Mickelson

- 5 (8:54) "Ombra fedele, anch'io" from Idaspe

Ruggero Leoncavallo (1857–1919)

- 6 (6:05) "È destin! Debbo andarmene" from La Bohème

== Personnel ==
=== Musical ===
- Frederica von Stade (b. 1945), mezzo-soprano
- Janice Taylor, mezzo-soprano (track 1)
- National Arts Centre Orchestra
- Mario Bernardi (1930–2013), conductor

=== Other ===
- Paul Walter Myers, producer
- Bud Graham, engineer

== Release history ==
On 1 October 1979, Columbia issued the album on LP (catalogue number M 35138), with sleeve notes by Robert Jacobson and an insert with texts and translations. The album was also issued on cassette.

In 2012, Newton Classics issued the album on CD with a 16-page biographical booklet by David Patrick Stearns in their 4-CD collection Frederica von Stade: Duets, Arias, Scenes & Songs (catalogue number 8802125). In 2016, Sony issued the album on CD (in a miniature replica of the sleeve of the original LP) with a 52-page booklet in their 18-CD collection Frederica von Stade: The Complete Columbia Recital Albums (catalogue number 88875183412).
