= Frederica von Stade =

American mezzo-soprano

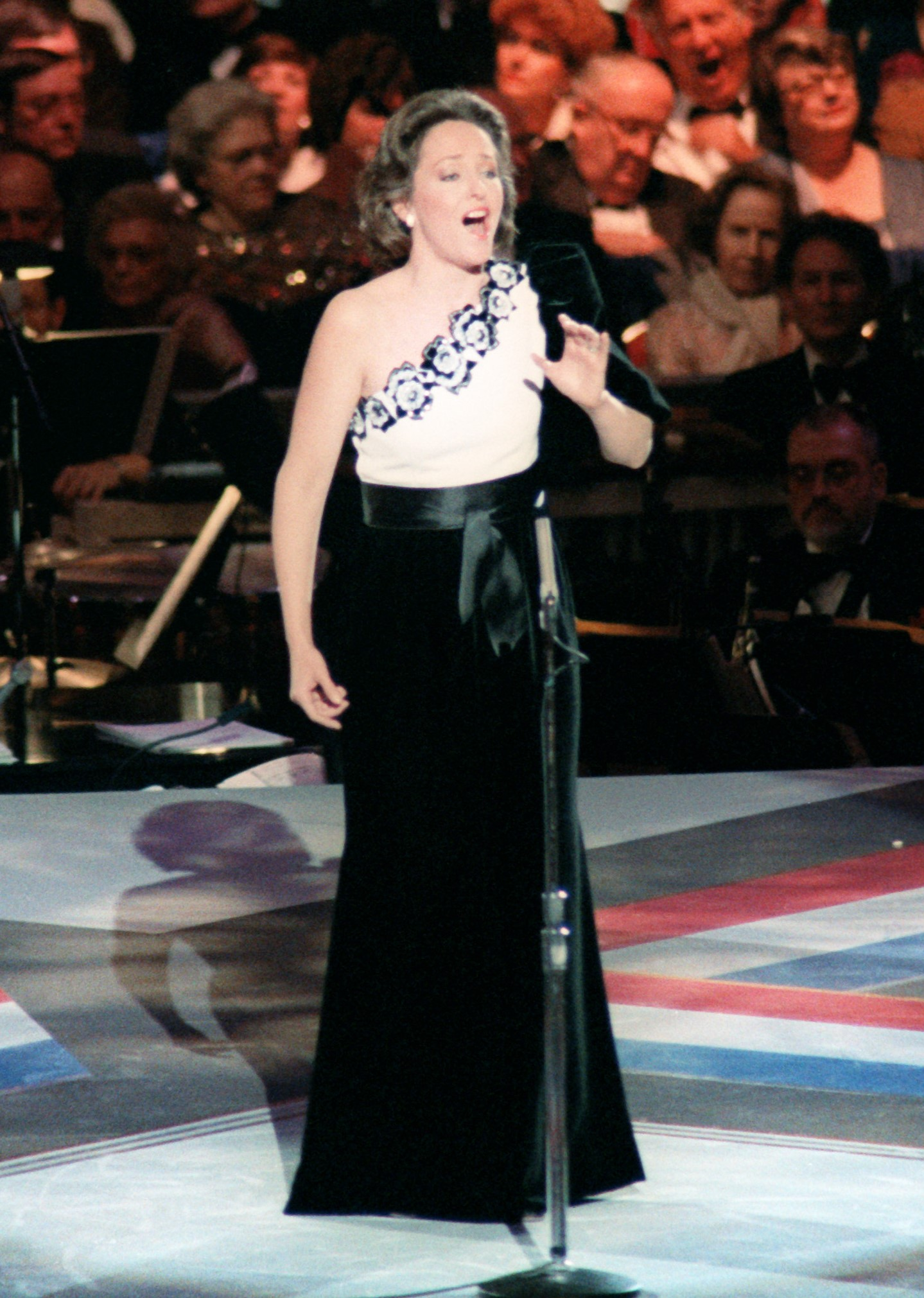
- Frederica von Stade, January 19, 1985
- Born: June 1, 1945 (age 81); Somerville, New Jersey, United States
- Education: Mannes School of Music, New York City
- Occupation: Opera singer (mezzo-soprano)
- Spouses: Peter Elkus (m. 1973; div. 1990) Michael G. Gorman (m. 1990)
- Children: 2

Frederica von Stade (born June 1, 1945) is an American former classical singer. Best known for her work in opera, she was also a recitalist and concert artist, and she recorded more than a hundred albums and videos. She is especially associated with operas by Mozart and Rossini, and also with music by French and American composers, particularly Jake Heggie. An Officier of France's Ordre des Arts et des Lettres, twice the winner of a Grand Prix du Disque and nominated nine times for a Grammy award, she is widely regarded as the pre-eminent lyric mezzo-soprano of her generation.

== Early life ==
Frederica von Stade—always Flicka (her childhood nickname) to her family, friends and fans—was born in Somerville, New Jersey, on June 1, 1945, the daughter of Sara Clucas von Stade and Charles Steele von Stade, a 1941 US Polo Champion, who had been killed by a landmine while serving with the US Army in Germany during World War II. Her early infancy was largely spent in the affluent hunt country of Somerset County, New Jersey, with a brief interlude in Greece and Italy during her mother's short-lived second marriage to a US State Department official, Horace Fuller.

She began her education at Stone Ridge School of the Sacred Heart and Holy Trinity School in Washington, DC, where her mother worked as a secretary for the CIA. When her mother relocated to Oldwick, New Jersey, she transferred to Far Hills Country Day School. FHCDS saw her in the first of her many trouser roles when she appeared there as Amahl in Amahl and the Night Visitors and Nanki-Poo in The Mikado. During her final high school years, she boarded at the Convent of the Sacred Heart, no longer extant, in Noroton, Connecticut. Her first visit to an opera house was in 1961, when her mother took her to the Salzburg Festival to hear Elisabeth Schwarzkopf and Christa Ludwig in Der Rosenkavalier.

With the help of a graduation gift from her grandfather, she spent a gap year studying and working in Paris before getting a job as a salesgirl in the stationery department of Tiffany's, New York City. She began her performing career acting in summer stock at the Long Wharf Theater and singing in nightclubs and in industrial musicals. In 1966 she visited New York's Mannes School of Music intending to take a part-time course in sight-reading, but was persuaded to enrol in its undergraduate music programme instead. In the second year of her course, she began studying opera under Sebastian Engelberg, who remained her teacher and most important mentor until his death in 1979.

== Career ==
After a successful appearance as a semi-finalist in the Metropolitan Opera National Council Auditions in 1969, von Stade was invited to join the Metropolitan Opera Studio. A summons from the rehearsal room to a private audition with Sir Rudolf Bing resulted in her signing a three-year contract as a comprimario. She made her Met debut as the Third Boy in Die Zauberflöte on 10 January 1970, and went on to play eighteen other apprentice roles as "everybody's page or their maid—I was an operatic domestic".

In 1971, the Met allowed her to moonlight in San Francisco and in Santa Fe as Sesto and Cherubino respectively, but in 1972, hungry for more challenging roles, she decided to embark on a career as a freelance. She debuted as Cherubino in Houston and as Rosina in Washington DC in 1973. That was also the year when she first sang in Europe: she was highly acclaimed as Cherubino—her signature role—in high-profile productions by Giorgio Strehler in Paris and by Peter Hall at Glyndebourne. Soon she was singing in all of opera's most prestigious houses, appearing as Cherubino in Salzburg in 1974, as Rosina at Covent Garden in 1975, as Rosina at La Scala in 1976 and as Cherubino in Vienna in 1977. Her recording of Joseph Haydn's Harmoniemesse (taped under Leonard Bernstein in 1973) was the first item in what grew to be a large and eclectic discography, and a telecast of Le nozze di Figaro from Glyndebourne in 1973 launched her on a television career that eventually made her a familiar face on screens in America and across the world. The highlights of her performing life included singing in Washington DC for Presidents Nixon, Carter, Reagan and George H. W. Bush, starring in a gala staged in honour of the 1992 Winter Olympics and participating in a televised concert led by Leonard Slatkin to mourn those murdered in the terrorist attacks of 9/11.

With a lyric mezzo-soprano voice that extended into soprano territory, she was a celebrated exponent of travesti roles like Hänsel, Idamante, and Octavian, and she was also much admired playing leading ladies like Angelina, Charlotte, Dorabella, Lucette, Mélisande, Penelope and Zerlina. In the autumn of her career, she transitioned into character parts, among them Despina, Geschwitz, Tina, the Marquise de Merteuil, Mrs De Rocher, Madeline Mitchell, Winnie Flato and Myrtle Bledsoe. Her repertoire ranged from the Baroque era through the Classical and Romantic periods all the way to modern music (including jazz and pop). Her many firsts included the US premiere of Monteverdi's Il ritorno d'Ulisse in patria, the Met's first performance of Mozart's Idomeneo, the first recording of Massenet's Cendrillon and the world premieres of operas by Dominick Argento, Lembit Beecher, Ricky Ian Gordon, Jake Heggie, Thomas Pasatieri, Conrad Susa and Heitor Villa-Lobos. Her appearances in musicals by Leonard Bernstein and Stephen Sondheim reflected a love of musical theatre that had been kindled when she was a little girl listening to her mother's records of songs by George Gershwin and Jerome Kern.

Although she was primarily a singing actress, she was also often heard on the concert stage, especially in the second half of her career. The composers whose orchestral pieces she programmed most often were Mozart, Mahler, Berlioz, Debussy, Ravel and Canteloube. These also featured in her recital repertoire, alongside Britten, Fauré, Handel, Offenbach, Poulenc, Schoenberg, Schubert, Schumann, Richard Strauss and the American composers for whom she was an evangelist and, in several cases, a muse. French mélodies were particularly dear to her—a Francophile, she became a fluent French speaker while still a teenager and made her home in Paris for several years during her early thirties. The pianist with whom she collaborated most often was Martin Katz.

Von Stade ceased performing full time in 2010, but she continued to make occasional appearances throughout the following decade and into the 2020s. Her activities in recent years have included taking part in benefit concerts, judging singing competitions and teaching interpretation in master classes.

== Personal life ==
Von Stade married Peter Elkus, a California-born bass-baritone and music teacher, in 1973. Their daughter Jenny (a clinical psychologist) was born in 1977, and their daughter Lisa (a technology company executive) in 1980. They divorced in 1990, and von Stade married Michael Gorman, an Alameda manufacturer and banker, shortly afterwards.

Von Stade is a practising Roman Catholic. Her extensive charitable work has involved her in a variety of programmes, most of them concerned with either education, health issues or homelessness. The main beneficiary of her philanthropy has been the Young Musicians Choral Orchestra, an East Bay organization that provides children from low income families with musical tuition, academic reinforcement and assistance in their personal development in order to help them to win a place at university.

Von Stade's many leisure activities include cooking, gardening, golf, sailing and ministering to a "West Highland terrorist" called Sadie.

== Biography and biographical movies ==
Von Stade's authorized biography, Richard Parlour's Flicka: The Life and Music of Frederica von Stade, is scheduled for publication in 2026. She has been the subject of two major film profiles: Call Me Flicka (BBC and RM Munich, 1980), produced by Herbert Chappell, and Flicka: A Love Letter (Paper Wings Films, 2023), directed by Brian Staufenbiel and produced by Nicolle Foland and Dede Wilsey. A hundred and ninety videos of von Stade performing or being interviewed are available via YouTube at "@FlickaVonStade".

== Select discography ==
- Argento: Casa Guidi, cond. Eiji Oue
- Berlioz: La damnation de Faust, cond. Georg Solti
- Berlioz and Debussy: Les nuits d'été and La damoiselle élue, cond. Seiji Ozawa
- Bernstein: Arias and Barcarolles, cond. Michael Tilson Thomas
- Bernstein: On the Town, cond. Michael Tilson Thomas
- Chris Brubeck: Convergence, cond. Sara Jobin
- Chris Brubeck and Dave Brubeck: Across Your Dreams
- Canteloube: Chants d'Auvergne Vol. 1, cond. Antonio de Almeida
- Canteloube: Chants d'Auvergne Vol. 2 and Triptyque, cond. Antonio de Almeida
- Danielpour: Elegies, cond. Roger Nierenberg
- Debussy: Mélodies, acc. Dalton Baldwin
- Debussy: Pelléas et Mélisande, cond. Herbert von Karajann
- De Falla: The Three-Cornered Hat, cond. André Previn
- Fauré: Mélodies, acc. Jean-Philippe Collard
- Fauré: L'œuvre d'orchestre, cond. Michel Plasson
- Gordon: A Coffin in Egypt, cond. Timothy Myers
- Joseph Haydn: La fedeltà premiata, cond. Antal Doráti
- Joseph Haydn: Harmoniemesse, cond. Leonard Bernstein
- Joseph Haydn: Il mondo della luna, cond. Antal Doráti
- Heggie: Dead Man Walking (2000), cond. Patrick Summers
- Heggie: Dead Man Walking (2011), cond. Patrick Summers
- Heggie: The Faces of Love - The Songs of Jake Heggie, acc. Jake Heggie
- Heggie: Flesh & Stone, acc. Jake Heggie
- Heggie: Passing By - Songs by Jake Heggie, acc. Jake Heggie
- Heggie: Three Decembers, cond. Patrick Summers
- Humperdinck: Hänsel und Gretel, cond. John Pritchard
- Kern: Show Boat, cond. John McGlinn
- Mahler: Lieder eines fahrenden Gesellen, Rückert Lieder and other songs, cond. Andrew Davis
- Mahler: Symphony No. 4, cond. Claudio Abbado
- Mahler: Symphony No. 4 and Lieder eines fahrenden Gesellen, cond. Yoel Levi
- Massenet: Cendrillon, cond. Julius Rudel
- Massenet: Chérubin, cond. Pinchas Steinberg
- Massenet: Werther, cond. Colin Davis
- Mendelssohn: A Midsummer Night's Dream, cond. Eugene Ormandy
- Mendelssohn: A Midsummer Night's Dream, cond. Seiji Ozawa
- Monteverdi: Il ritorno d'Ulisse in patria, cond. Raymond Leppard
- Monteverdi and Cavalli: Frederica von Stade chante Monteverdi & Cavalli, cond. Raymond Leppard
- Mozart: La clemenza di Tito, cond. Colin Davis
- Mozart: Così fan tutte, cond. Alain Lombard
- Mozart: Le nozze di Figaro, cond. Herbert von Karajan
- Mozart: Le nozze di Figaro, cond. Georg Solti
- Mozart: Waisenhausmesse, cond. Claudio Abbado
- Mozart and Rossini: Mozart and Rossini Arias, cond. Edo de Waart
- Offenbach: Arias and Overtures, cond. Antonio de Almeida
- Porter: Anything Goes, cond. John McGlinn
- Rameau: Dardanus, cond. Raymond Leppard
- Ravel: Shéhérazade and other songs, cond. Seiji Ozawa
- Rodgers and Hammerstein: The Sound of Music, cond. Erich Kunzel
- Rodgers and Hart: My Funny Valentine, cond. John McGlinn
- Rossini: Otello, cond. Jesús López-Cobos
- Richard Strauss: Der Rosenkavalier, cond. Edo de Waart
- Thomas: Mignon, cond. Antonio de Almeida
- Wilberg: Requiem and other works, cond. Craig Jessop
- Various: Angel Heart, cond. Michael Morgan
- Various: Flicka: Another Side of Frederica von Stade, cond. Jeremy Lubbock
- Various: Frederica von Stade: French Opera Arias, cond. John Pritchard
- Various: Frederica von Stade: Italian Opera Arias, cond. Mario Bernardi
- Various: Frederica von Stade: Liederabend, acc. Martin Katz
- Various: Frederica von Stade Live!, acc. Martin Katz
- Various: Judith Blegen and Frederica von Stade: Songs, Arias and Duets, acc. Charles Wadsworth
- Various: Marilyn Horne: Divas in Song, acc. various
- Various: Marilyn Horne and Frederica von Stade: Lieder and Duets, acc. Martin Katz
- Various: Opera Stars in Concert, cond. Anton Guadagno
- Various: Pauline Viardot and Friends, acc. David Harper
- Various: Puttin' on the Ritz, cond. Erich Kunzel
- Various: A Salute to American Music, cond. James Conlon
- Various: Simple Gifts / A Song of Thanksgiving, cond. Joseph Silverstein
- Various: Song Recital, acc. Martin Katz
- Various: Voyage à Paris: Frederica von Stade, acc. Martin Katz

== Select videography ==
- Bernstein: On the Town, Barbican Centre
- Dvořák: Dvořák in Prague: A Celebration, Smetana Hall
- Heggie: Great Scott, Dallas Opera
- Humperdinck: Hänsel und Gretel, Metropolitan Opera
- Mozart: Great Mass in C Minor, Waldsassen
- Mozart: Idomeneo, Metropolitan Opera
- Mozart: Le nozze di Figaro, Glyndebourne
- Mozart: Le nozze di Figaro, Metropolitan Opera
- Mozart: Le nozze di Figaro, Paris Opera
- Rossini: La Cenerentola, La Scala
- Rossini: The Rossini Bicentennial Birthday Gala, David Geffen Hall
- Richard Strauss: Richard Strauss Gala, Berliner Philharmonie
- Various: A Carnegie Hall Christmas Concert, Carnegie Hall
- Various: Christmas with Flicka, St Wolfgang im Salzkammergut
- Various: Christmas with the Mormon Tabernacle Choir and Orchestra at Temple Square, Salt Lake City Conference Center
- Various: Glyndebourne Festival Opera: A Gala Evening, Glyndebourne
- Various: James Levine's 25th Anniversary Metropolitan Opera Gala, Metropolitan Opera
- Various: The Metropolitan Opera Centennial Gala, Metropolitan Opera
- Various: The Metropolitan Opera Gala 1991, Metropolitan Opera

== Sources ==
- Guthrie, Julian: Opera's thoroughbred, San Francisco Examiner, 28 Aug 1994
- Jacobson, Robert: Flicka and Richard, Opera News, 24 January 1976
- James, Jamie: Frederica the Great, Opera Now, June 1991
- Kellow, Brian: Cherubino grows up, Opera News, 1 April 1995
- Lessard, Suzannah: Flicka, The New Yorker, 7 May 1979
- McLellan, Joseph: Von Stade's Cinderella story, The Washington Post, 27 Feb 1988
- Michaelson, Judith: Oh, the life of the diva, Los Angeles Times, 4 May 1980
- Movshon, George: Frederica von Stade, Opera, January 1980
- Paolucci, Bridget: A time for soul-searching, Opera News, 30 Jan 1988
- Spoto, Donald: Flicka in ¾ time, Opera News, March 2000
- Swan, Annalyn: The sweetheart of American opera, Newsweek, 4 April 1983
- Tassel, Janet: A real thoroughbred, Opera News, 9 April 1983
