= Carol Hall =

American songwriter (1936 - 2018)

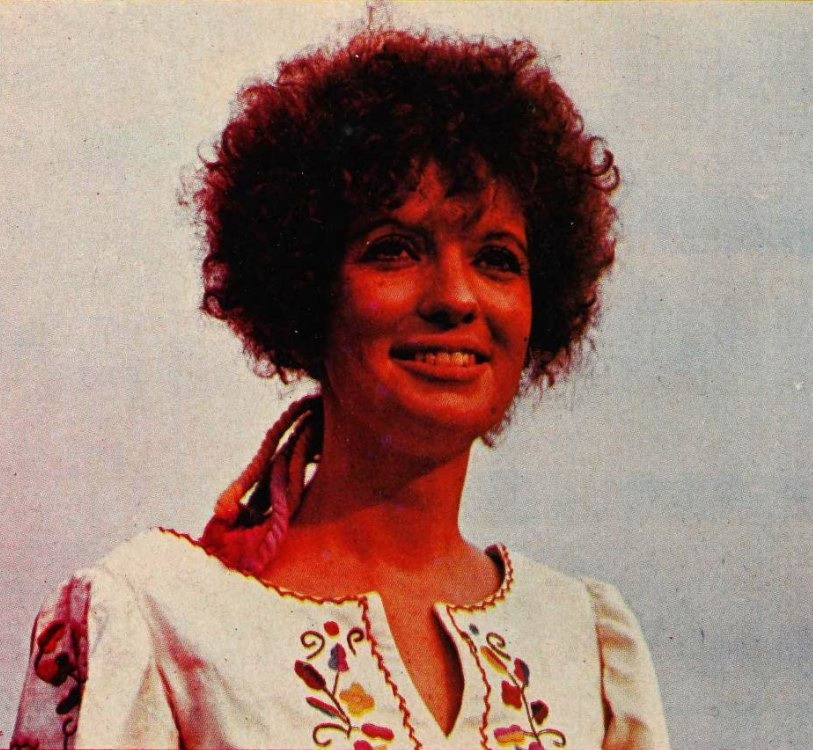
- Hall featured in the August 1972 issue of Hit Parader

Background information
- Born: April 3, 1936; Abilene, Texas, U.S.
- Died: October 11, 2018 (aged 82) New York City, U.S.
- Genres: Musical theatre
- Occupations: Composer, lyricist, singer

Carol Hall (April 3, 1936 – October 11, 2018) was an American songwriter. She was best known for composing the music and lyrics for the Broadway stage musical The Best Little Whorehouse in Texas (1978, adapted as a film in 1982). Her other works include the Broadway sequel The Best Little Whorehouse Goes Public (1994), as well as the Off-Broadway musical To Whom It May Concern (c. 1986).

== Career ==
Hall was born in 1936 in Abilene, Texas, United States. She graduated with a B.A. from Sarah Lawrence College in 1960 and joined ASCAP in 1970.

She penned eight one-act plays, all under the title "The Days Are As Grass". The work was acquired by Samuel French for publication and theatrical licensing. In 2012 a production was mounted at Theater of the Spirit, Newcastle, Maine.

Her career included singing in clubs and similar venues. In 1970, she signed to Elektra Records as a singer-songwriter and had two albums released on the label in 1971 and 1972, If I Be Your Lady and Beads and Feathers. Her album Hallways: The Songs of Carol Hall was released in 2009 on the LML Music label.

In 1972, Hall was invited by Marlo Thomas to create three songs for the album Free to Be... You and Me (1972) and the 1974 television special based on the album. The songs were "Parents Are People," "It's All Right to Cry," and "Glad to Have a Friend Like You." In 2012 Free to Be... You and Me celebrated its fortieth anniversary with panel discussions about its impact on parenting.

Hall wrote lyrics to "The Two Lonely People" by Bill Evans for Together Again, an album he recorded with Tony Bennett. The song was later covered by Roberta Gambarini, Jane Monheit, Mark Murphy, Donna Byrne, and Laurel Massé. She also wrote the lyrics to "Very Early" by Evans, which was recorded by Mark Murphy.

Hall contributed to Sesame Street for many years. With Sam Pottle she wrote the song "A Very Simple Dance" (1974). Her other compositions for the program include the feminist-themed "Women Can Be", "The Plant in the Window", "Big Bird's Beautiful Birthday Bash," "Ichi Ni San" (from Big Bird Goes to Japan), and the Grammy-winning "True Blue Miracle" from Christmas Eve on Sesame Street. She also wrote the song "Jenny Rebecca" which appeared on Barbra Streisand's album My Name Is Barbra (1965).

For a national tour of The Best Little Whorehouse in Texas starring Ann-Margret, Hall recorded a final (extra) track on the 2001 cast album. The song "A Friend to Me" was written for Ann-Margret and that production. She also composed the music and lyrics for Theatreworks/USA's production of Max & Ruby, which had a libretto by playwright Glen Berger, who wrote the book to the musical Spider-Man: Turn Off the Dark.

She contributed lyrics for a musical based on Truman Capote's short story "A Christmas Memory" (book: Duane Poole, music: Larry Grossman), which premiered at Theatreworks in Palo Alto, California in 2010.

Hall was a Lifetime Member of the Dramatists Guild Council and Vice-President of the Dramatists Guild Fund.

Hall died on October 11, 2018, at the age of 82.

== Discography ==
- If I Be Your Lady (Elektra, 1970)
- Beads & Feathers (Elektra, 1972)
- Jenny Rebecca, with Frederica von Stade (mezzo-soprano) and Martin Katz (piano) (Columbia, 1978)
- Hallways: The Songs of Carol Hall (LML, 2009)

== Bibliography ==
- ASCAP (1980) The ASCAP Biographical Dictionary, 4th ed., p. 208, ISBN 0-8352-1283-1 .
