= Marilyn Horne & Frederica von Stade: Lieder & Duets =

- RCA Victor Red Seal CD: 09026 61681 2

Studio album by Marilyn Horne, Frederica von Stade & Martin Katz
- Released: 1993
- Studio: Lehmann Hall, Music Academy of the West, Montecito, California
- Genre: Classical vocal
- Length: 49:09
- Language: German & Scots English
- Label: RCA Victor Red Seal
- Producer: John Pfeiffer

Marilyn Horne & Frederica von Stade: Lieder & Duets is a 49-minute classical studio album in which Horne sings songs by Robert Schumann and Antonin Dvoŕák, and Horne and von Stade sing duets by Felix Mendelssohn Bartholdy, all accompanied by Martin Katz on the piano. The recording was released in 1993.

== Recording ==
The album was digitally recorded on 8, 10 and 17 July 1992 in the Lehmann Hall of the Music Academy of the West in Montecito, California.

== Packaging ==
The cover of the album was designed under the art direction of J. J. Stelmach, and features a photograph of Horne, von Stade and Katz taken by Christian Steiner.

== Critical reception ==
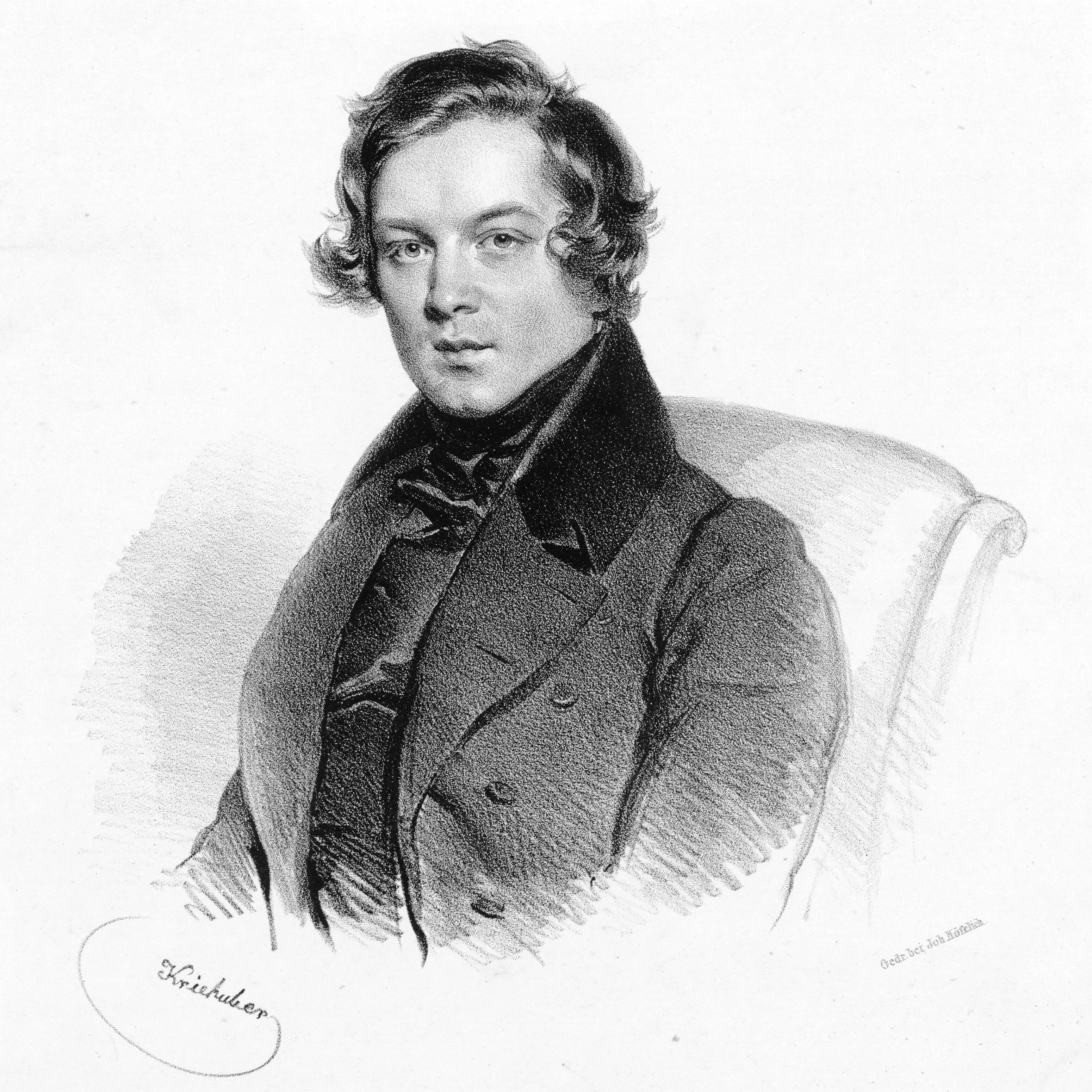
Robert Schumann in an 1839 lithograph by Josef Knehuber

J. B. Steane reviewed the album in Gramophone in March 1994. At first glance, he wrote, with von Stade and Horne equally prominent on its cover, it looked like an anthology of duets. In fact, most of it was sung by Horne alone, and, despite the sensitive support of Martin Katz at the piano, not entirely successfully. Yes, her singing was compelling and sometimes rewarding. Yes, in her Dvořák group, her "Gypsy Melodies [had] some panache". Yes, she was scrupulously restrained in her Schumann group. Yes, she was "careful over her German", enunciating clearly. And yes, she was spine-tingling in the last of the Frauenliebe songs, portraying "a woman in whom the change wrought by catastrophe [was] total and shocking". But her Schumann was a little monotonous, and her performance of both sets of Lieder suffered from the vocal deterioration entailed by her advancing years. Her voice was uneven, no longer as firm or as fresh as it needed to be, and afflicted by "a wide and persistent vibrato". When she sang her Mendelssohn duets with von Stade, on the other hand, the results were happier: her vibrato was less obtrusive, and her voice blended well with that of her younger friend. And that the two mezzos' "nuance and phrasing [were] unanimous and well judged" was evidence of conscientious preparation. Brigitte Fassbaender, Steane observed, had developed vocal difficulties comparable to Horne's. and yet remained a magnetic performer because her gifts as an artist were so extraordinary. But Horne's communicative powers were not great enough to compensate for her voice's decline. She could no longer be relied upon to give pleasure when singing Lieder on disc.

A second review of the album can be found in Fanfare's subscriber-only archive.

== CD track listing ==
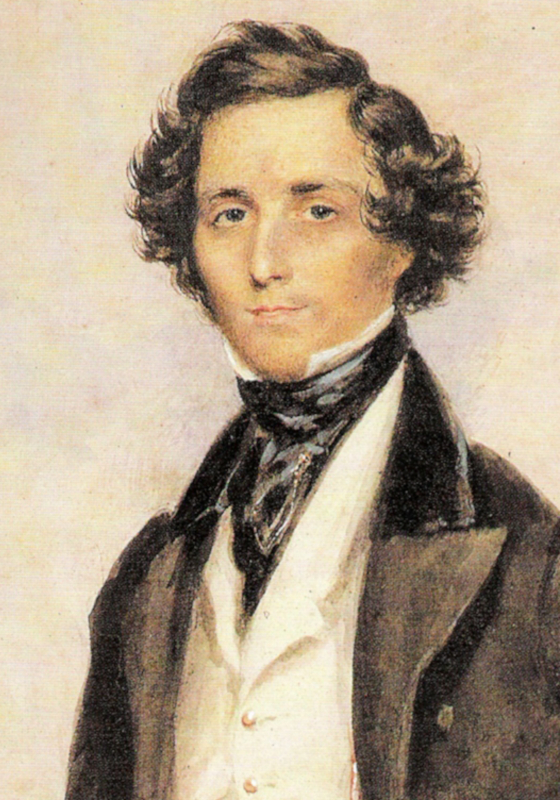
Felix Mendelssohn Bartholdy in an 1839 watercolour by James Warren Childe

Robert Schumann (1810–1856)

Frauenliebe und -leben, Op. 42 (texts by Adalbert von Chamisso)

- 1 (2:29) Seit ich ihn gesehen
- 2 (3:10) Er, der Herrlichste von allen
- 3 (1:44) Ich kann's nicht fassen, nicht glauben
- 4 (2:40) Du Ring an meinem Finger
- 5 (2:04) Helft mir, ihr Schwestern
- 6 (4:51) Süsser Freund, du blickest
- 7 (1:08) An meinem Herzen, an meiner Brust
- 8 (4:25) Nun hast du mir den ersten Schmerz getan

Felix Mendelssohn Bartholdy (1809–1847)

- 9 (2:02) Ich wollt' meine Lieb', Op. 63 No. 1 (text by Heinrich Heine)
- 10 (2:34) Gruss, Op. 63 No. 3 (text by Joseph von Eichendorff)
- 11 (2:28) Volkslied: O wert thou in the cauld blast, Op. 63 No. 5 (text by Robert Burns)
- 12 (2:30) Abendlied (text by Heinrich Heine)

Antonín Dvořák (1841–1904)

Zigeunermelodien, Op. 55, B. 104 (texts by Adolf Heyduk)

- 13 (3:02) Mein Lied ertönt
- 14 (1:15) Ei, wie mein Triangel
- 15 (3:30) Rings ist der Wald
- 16 (1:16) Reingestimmt die Saiten
- 17 (1:37) In dem weiten, breiten, lüft'gen Leinenkleide
- 18 (2:40) Als die alte Mutter
- 19 (2:04) Darf des Falken Schwinge

== Personnel ==
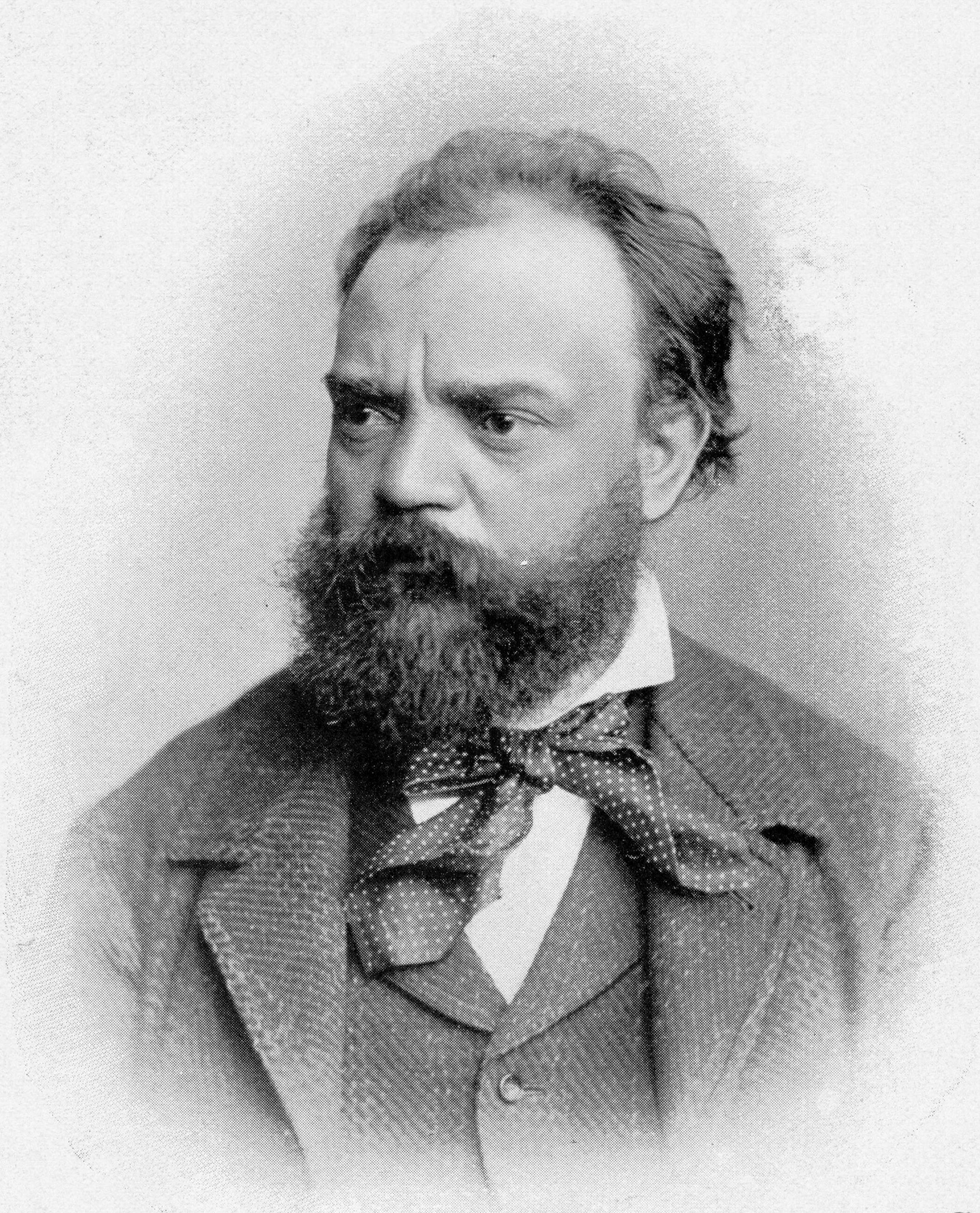
Antonín Dvóřak in 1882

=== Musical ===
- Marilyn Horne, mezzo-soprano (tracks 1–19)
- Frederica von Stade, mezzo-soprano (tracks 9–12)
- Martin Katz, piano (tracks 1–19)

=== Other ===
- John Pfeiffer, producer
- J. Magee, balance engineer
- F. Vogler, engineer
- P. Hopf, engineer

== Release history ==
In 1993, RCA Victor Red Seal released the album on CD (catalogue number 09026 61681 2) with a 40-page insert booklet including texts, biographies of the artists and programme notes by Robert L. Lustig in English, French and German.
