= Peter Elkus =

American international voice teacher

Peter Elkus (born in 1939 in San Francisco, California) is a voice teacher giving master classes for both singers and instrumentalists. His classes have been presented in institutions in ten countries, including the University of Music and Performing Arts, Vienna, the Munich State Opera, the Accademia Musicale Ottorino Respighi in Assisi and Rome, the Théâtre des Champs-Élysées in Paris and the Teatro Colón in Buenos Aires.

== Career ==
Elkus was asked to fill the vacancy created by the death of his teacher, Sebastian Engelberg, at the Mannes College of Music, where he was listed on the faculty for over a decade. He has been judge of the Regional Auditions of the Metropolitan Opera and President of the panel of judges for the Richard Wagner Foundation, Teatro Colón, Buenos Aires.

He has authored the well received book The Telling of Our Truths - The Magic in Great Musical Performance (published in 2007; revised in 2009) with comments by Gerald Ginsberg (Composer and poet), Dr Charles Kaufman (former President of the Mannes College of Music), Dalton Baldwin (pianist, accompanist, coach, educator and recording artist), Jean Luc Vannier (psychoanalyst, music critic and lecturer), Mut Asheru (Editor in Chief Unsigned, The Magazine) and Shinji Eshima (instrumentalist and composer with affiliations with the San Francisco Ballet and Opera Orchestras, San Francisco State University and San Francisco Conservatory of Music).

As a student, he attended opera workshops at the Goldovsky Opera Workshops, in Denver, Colorado, in Wheeling, West Virginia and at New York's Hunter College and Mannes College of Music. He was also chosen by Maria Callas as a member of the Juilliard Opera Center.

He met his former wife and student Frederica von Stade at Mannes College in 1967. They married in 1973, have two daughters and divorced in 1990. He taught Ms. von Stade between 1975 and 1985 during the absences and illnesses and after the eventual death (1979) of their teacher Sebastian Engelberg. During this time, the recordings of Ms. von Stade garnered prizes in France, Germany and Italy in addition to one Grammy award and eleven Grammy nominations (eight in the category of Best Classical Vocalist).

In the Opera News article "Flicka in ¾ time", Donald Spoto referred to Elkus’s influence on von Stade as having …"guided her through the thickets of an expanding repertory and a demanding worldwide schedule."

In the case Elkus v. Elkus, 572 N.Y.S.2d 901 (N.Y. App. Div. 1991) Elkus was defendant in a dispute with von Stade over marital property and earnings. The case is often used as case study in property class during the first year of law school.

== See also ==
- Frederica von Stade

== Sources ==
- "Articles about Peter Elkus". Los Angeles Times. Archived from the original on October 25, 2012.
- Masterclasses. L’Association Art Musique Europeenne, Masterclasses
