= George Jellinek =

American radio host (1919–2010)

George Jellinek (December 22, 1919 – January 16, 2010) was the Hungarian-born host of The Vocal Scene, a weekly syndicated radio feature produced by WQXR radio of New York City. Over three decades, from 1969 to 2004, he steadily interviewed opera singers and other figures of classical music on his show, and presented comparative recordings of arias and excerpts with commentary which the New York Times deemed "encyclopedic".

Jellinek served in the United States Army and trained in Military Intelligence at Camp Ritchie in the mountains of Maryland, thus making him one of the Ritchie Boys.

Born in Újpest, Budapest, Hungary, Jellinek was a longtime resident of the New York City area. He was also familiar to radio audiences for his appearances during intermissions on the Metropolitan Opera radio broadcasts.

Jellinek retired from The Vocal Scene with the broadcast of December 23, 2004. On May 31, 2006, at a ceremony held at the Hungarian Consulate in New York City, he was decorated by the Hungarian Government for his lifetime contributions to the arts.

Repeats of his program can still be heard on several stations, among them WQXR in New York City, WFMT in Chicago, and on XM Satellite Radio's VOX channel.

Radio station WQXR announced his death in an on-air tribute on January 18, 2010. Among his bibliography is Callas: Portrait of a Prima Donna (1960).

== Writings ==
- History Through the Opera Glass. London: Kahn & Averill. 2000. ISBN 1-871-08274-9.
