= Zurich Opera =

Opera company

Zurich Opera (Opernhaus Zürich) is a Swiss opera company based in Zurich. The company gives performances in the Zurich Opera House.

== History ==
The first performance at the current theatre occurred on 30 September 1891, with a production of Wagner's Lohengrin. Wilhelm Furtwängler began his career there, and in 1913 Richard Wagner’s Parsifal was given its first performance outside Bayreuth. Ferruccio Busoni, Paul Hindemith, Richard Strauss, Othmar Schoeck, Arthur Honegger, Frank Martin and other famous composers all left their mark on the development of Zürich's musical theatre. Zurich Opera House has been the setting for numerous world premières, such as Alban Berg’s Lulu, Paul Hindemith’s Mathis der Maler, Arnold Schönberg’s Moses und Aron, and Rudolf Kelterborn's Der Kirschgarten. Works by Heinrich Sutermeister and Giselher Klebe were also performed there for the first time.

From 1975 to 1986, Claus Helmut Drese was artistic director of the company. His artistic standards led the company to gain international recognition, through the presentation of the Monteverdi cycle, with Nikolaus Harnoncourt as conductor and Jean-Pierre Ponnelle as director and set designer.

In the 1991–1992 season, Alexander Pereira became Intendant (general director) of the company. His tenure opened with Lohengrin in a production by Robert Wilson. He placed great emphasis on promoting promising young artists and new types of performances. Pereira initiated the Zurich Festival in the autumn of 1996, with the first festival held in the summer of 1997. Pereira concluded his tenure as Intendant of the company in 2008.

Andreas Homoki succeeded Pereira as Intendant of the company beginning in 2012. During Homoki's tenure, Fabio Luisi served as Generalmusikdirektor (GMD) of the company. In July 2018, Zurich Opera announced simultaneously the extension of Homoki's contract as Intendant through 2025, the scheduled conclusion of Luisi's tenure as GMD after the 2020–2021 season, and the appointment of Gianandrea Noseda as the next GMD of the company, effective in 2021. In October 2022, the company announced an extension of Noseda's contract as GMD with the company through the 2027–2028 season. Homoki concluded his tenure as Intendant of the company in 2025. Matthias Schulz became Intendant of the company as of the 2025–2026 season.

Noseda is scheduled to stand down as GMD of the company at the close of the 2027–2028 season. In December 2025, the company announced the appointment of Lorenzo Viotti as its next Generalmusikdirektor, effective with the 2028–2029 season, with an initial contract of two seasons.

== Conductors in leadership positions (partial list) ==
- Nello Santi (GMD, 1958–1969)
- Ferdinand Leitner ('Musikalischer Oberleiter', 1969–1984)
- Ralf Weikert (chief conductor, 1985–1992)
- Franz Welser-Möst (chief conductor, 1995–2005; GMD, 2005–2008).
- Daniele Gatti (chief conductor, 2009–2012)
- Fabio Luisi (GMD, 2012–2021)
- Gianandrea Noseda (GMD, 2021–present)
- Lorenzo Viotti (GMD designated, from 2028)
