= Marilyn Horne =

American opera singer (born 1934)

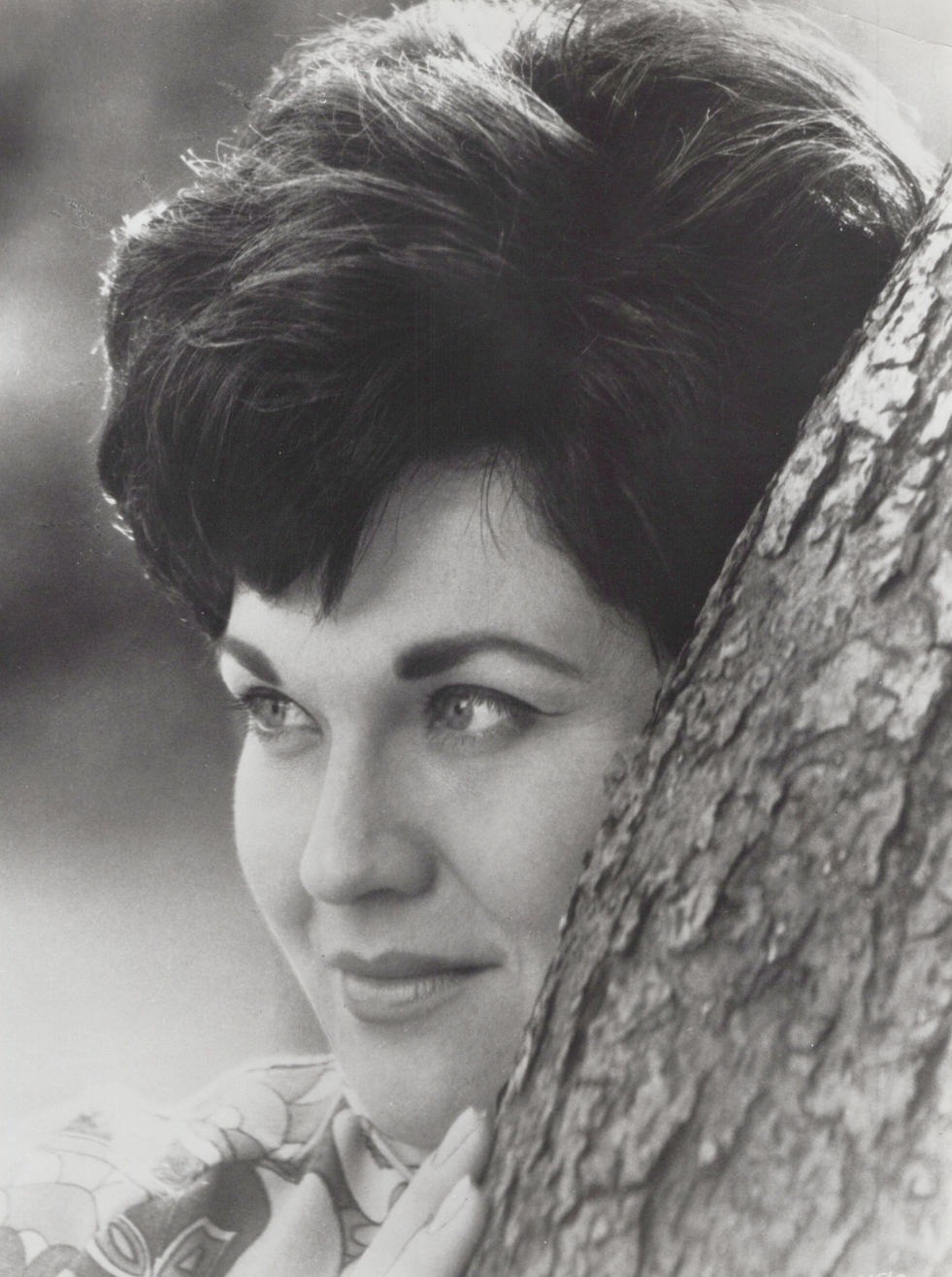
- Horne in 1972
- Born: January 16, 1934 (age 92); Bradford, Pennsylvania, U.S.
- Other names: Jackie; Peanut
- Occupation: Opera singer (mezzo-soprano)
- Years active: 1954–1999
- Known for: Bel canto and opera seria roles
- Spouse: Henry Lewis (1960–1979; divorced)
- Children: 1

Marilyn Berneice Horne (born January 16, 1934) is an American operatic mezzo-soprano. She specialized in roles requiring beauty of tone, excellent breath support, and the ability to execute difficult coloratura passages. She is a recipient of the National Medal of Arts and the Kennedy Center Honors, and has won four Grammy Awards.

== Early life ==
Marilyn Berneice Horne was born in Bradford, Pennsylvania, one of the four children of Bentz and Berneice Horne. Her parents were both politicians, with her mother serving as city assessor of the Fifth Ward and her father appointed as McKean County assessor. Bentz was also a semi-professional singer and, noticing Marilyn's talent, sought to move the family to a place where she could have access to professional vocal training and more opportunities to perform. Along with her older brother Richard and sister Gloria, the family moved to Long Beach, California when Marilyn was 11. Her younger brother, Jay, was born after the move to Long Beach, in 1949.

At age 13, Horne became founding member of the newly formed Roger Wagner Chorale along with Marni Nixon, Paul Salamunovich, Salli Terri and Harve Presnell. She is an alumna of Long Beach Polytechnic High School. As a high school student, she was part of the St. Luke's Episcopal Church Choir of Long Beach under the direction of William Ripley Dorr. The choir often worked for the movie studios and recorded with Capitol Records. Marilyn and her sister Gloria were part of the St. Luke's Episcopal Church Quartet.

== Education ==
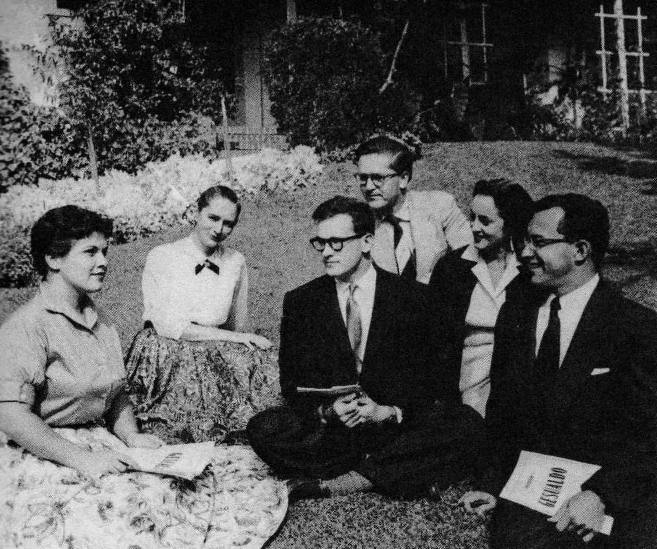
Marilyn Horne (left) performed as the second soprano of the Gesualdo Madrigalists, a five-person group formed by conductor Robert Craft (center) to explore the radical music of Italian composer Carlo Gesualdo. Other members included Grace-Lynne Martin (soprano), Charlie Scharbach (bass), Cora Lauridsen (alto), and Richard Robinson (tenor).

Horne won a scholarship for the University of Southern California where she was a member of Pi Beta Phi sorority. She studied voice under William Vennard and Gwendolyn Koldofsky at the University of Southern California School of Music and participated in Lotte Lehmann's vocal master classes at Music Academy of the West.

== Career ==
Horne's first major professional engagement was in 1954, when she dubbed the singing voice of Dorothy Dandridge in the film Carmen Jones. Until that point, she had worked as a background singer for several TV sitcoms, as well as recorded covers of popular songs of the early 1950s, which were sold in dimestores around the country for $1.98. She made her Los Angeles debut the same year when she performed the role of Hata in The Bartered Bride with the Los Angeles Guild Opera.

Her first major breakthrough came when her singing ability was recognized by Igor Stravinsky; her operatic career began when he invited her to perform in the 1956 Venice festival. She remained in Europe for three seasons singing for the Gelsenkirchen Opera. She was highly acclaimed for her performance as Marie in Alban Berg's Wozzeck at the inauguration of Gelsenkirchen's new opera house on May 22, 1960. In 1960, she returned to the United States to appear in Wozzeck at the San Francisco Opera. She debuted in 1961 at Lyric Opera of Chicago where she created the role of Lora in Vittorio Giannini's The Harvest.

For many years, Horne was associated with the Australian soprano Dame Joan Sutherland in their performances of the bel canto repertoire. They first performed together in a concert version of Vincenzo Bellini's Beatrice di Tenda at The Town Hall in Manhattan in February 1961. This performance was so successful it was repeated twice at Carnegie Hall. In 1965, they were paired again in a performance of Rossini's Semiramide with the Opera Company of Boston, and sang in a joint concert on October 15, 1979, which was telecast as "Live from Lincoln Center".

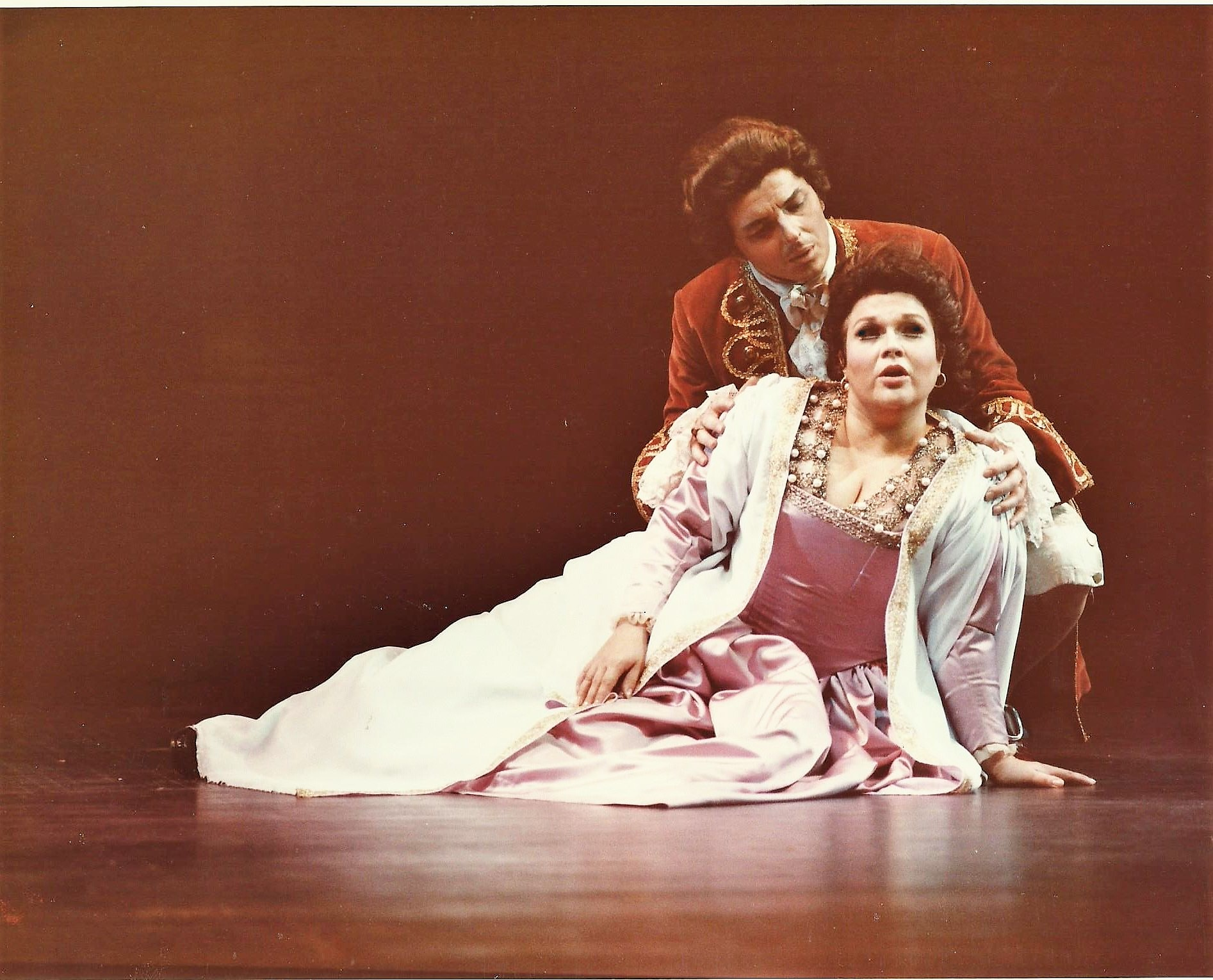
Beniamino Prior as Wilhelm Meister and Marilyn Horne as the titular Mignon, Edmonton Opera, 1978.

Horne made her debut at the Royal Opera House in October 1964 as Marie in Wozzeck. Her La Scala debut was as Jocasta in Stravinsky's opera-oratorio Œdipus rex on March 13, 1969. Another of Horne's breakthroughs occurred that same year during a performance of Rossini's Le siège de Corinthe at La Scala, when Horne received a remarkable mid-act seven-minute ovation. Horne made her debut at the Metropolitan Opera in 1970 as Adalgisa in Bellini's Norma with Sutherland in the title role. She thereafter appeared regularly at the Met, opening the 1972/1973 season as Carmen. A great success there was in Meyerbeer's Le prophète, in John Dexter's production. In 1984, she sang the title role of Handel's opera seria Rinaldo (directed by Frank Corsaro), the first Handel opera ever performed at the Met.

Although best known for her bel canto and opera seria roles, Horne also sang much American music, both contemporary music by composers such as William Bolcom, and traditional popular songs. She can be heard on the soundtrack of the 1961 film Flower Drum Song singing "Love, Look Away" and she sang the role of Lady Thiang on the Philips recording of The King and I starring Julie Andrews and Ben Kingsley. She had previously sung in the women's chorus for the 1956 film version of The King and I.

She made an appearance on The Odd Couple as a character named "Jackie", her own nickname, a meek and nervous would-be singer who develops a crush on character Oscar Madison (Jack Klugman) and into a full-blown diva as well, playing the role of Carmen in Felix Unger's (Tony Randall) opera group production. She also sang on The Tonight Show Starring Johnny Carson and The Carol Burnett Show.

With co-writer Jane Scovell, she published the candid 1983 autobiography My Life and the 2004 follow-up The Song Continues.

On July 5, 1986, she performed on the New York Philharmonic's tribute to the 100th anniversary of the Statue of Liberty, which was televised live on ABC Television. The orchestra, conducted by Zubin Mehta, performed in Central Park. She sang an aria from Carmen by Georges Bizet.

In January 1993, Horne sang "Make A Rainbow" by American singer and songwriter Portia Nelson, and the Shaker hymn "Simple Gifts" at the inauguration of President Bill Clinton.

=== Retirement ===
Horne retired from the concert stage in 1999 with a recital at the Chicago Symphony Center. She still occasionally performs at pop concerts (especially with late Broadway star Barbara Cook). Horne has also established the Marilyn Horne Foundation to help preserve the art of vocal recitals. She teaches a series of annual Master Classes at the Oberlin Conservatory of Music; the University of Maryland, College Park; the Manhattan School of Music; and the University of Oklahoma.

From 1997 to 2018 Horne directed the Voice Program at the Music Academy of the West in Santa Barbara, California. Since 2018 she holds the position of Honorary Voice Program Director. She was scheduled to teach and remain the head of the jury for the Marilyn Horne Song Competition through 2020.

== Marilyn Horne Museum and Exhibit Center ==
In 2013, Horne donated her personal archives to the University of Pittsburgh. The creation of the Marilyn Horne Museum and Exhibit Center in the Pitt Bradford campus’ Seneca Building (now Marilyn Horne Hall) was partially made possible through a $3 million grant the McKean County Industrial Development Authority received from the Commonwealth of Pennsylvania's Redevelopment Assistance Capital Program in 2013.

Since opening on May 6, 2017, the museum publicly displays a rotating portion of the collection at the regional campus in Bradford, from which she received an honorary degree in 2004. The museum is open seven days a week and admission is free.

== Personal life ==
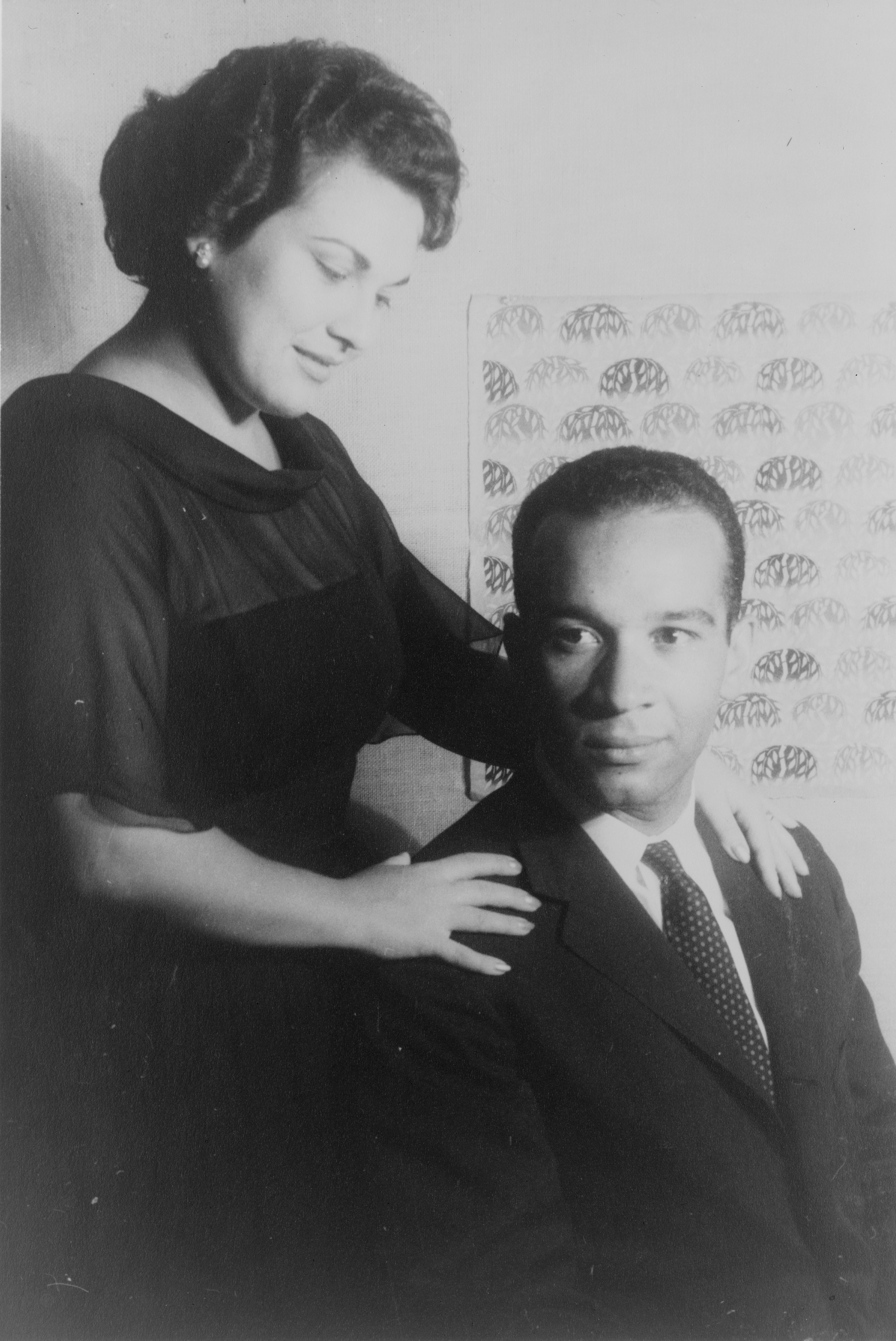
Marilyn Horne and her husband Henry Lewis in 1961. Photo by Carl Van Vechten.

Horne was married from 1960 to 1979 (separated 1974) to the conductor Henry Lewis, whom she met in college at the University of Southern California. Her mother initially had misgivings that the interracial marriage would have a negative impact on Horne's career, saying, "Be his mistress, for God's sake, not his wife," but soon reconciled with them. They maintained a home in the Echo Park neighborhood of Los Angeles for many years. In 1965 the couple welcomed a daughter named Angela. After Horne's breakup with Lewis, she began a long-term relationship with Greek bass Nicola Zaccaria.

In December 2005, shortly before Horne's 72nd birthday, she was diagnosed with localized pancreatic cancer. In January 2007, she appeared at a public function for her Foundation. Interviewed by Norman Lebrecht on BBC Radio 3 on July 26, 2010, she spoke briefly about her cancer and cheerfully said, "I'm still here!"

== Partial discography ==
- Beethoven: Ninth Symphony (M. Price, Vickers, Salminen; Zubin Mehta, 1983) [live] RCA Red Seal
- Bellini: Norma (Sutherland, J. Alexander, Cross; Richard Bonynge, 1964) Decca
- Bernstein: West Side Story (Te Kanawa, Troyanos, Carreras; Leonard Bernstein, 1984) Deutsche Grammophon. A television documentary was made about this studio recording.
- Berlioz: Les Troyens (Nicolai Gedda, Robert Massard, Robert Amis El Hage, Boris Carmeli, Veriano Luchetti, Carlo Gaifa, Rosina Cavicchiola, Marilyn Horne, Shirley Verrett, Giovanna Fioroni; Georges Prêtre, 1969) Arkadia
- Bizet: Carmen (Maliponte, McCracken, Krause; Leonard Bernstein, 1972) Deutsche Grammophon
- Donizetti: Anna Bolena (Souliotis, J. Alexander, Ghiaurov; Silvio Varviso, 1968/69) Decca
- Donizetti: Lucrezia Borgia (Sutherland, Aragall, Wixell; Richard Bonynge, 1977) Decca
- Gluck: Orfeo ed Euridice (Lorengar, Donath; Georg Solti, 1970) Decca

External audio
- You may hear Marilyn Horne with Henry Jay Lewis conducting the Vienna Cantata Orchestra in music by Bach and Handel in 1969; Here on archive.org

- Handel: Rinaldo (Gasdia, Palacio, Weidinger; John Fisher, 1989) Nuova Era
- Handel: Semele (Battle, Ramey; John Nelson, 1990) Deutsche Grammophon
- Mahler: Kindertotenlieder (Lewis) Decca
- Mahler: Lieder eines fahrenden Gesellen (Mehta) Decca
- Mahler: Rückert-Lieder (Mehta) Decca
- Massenet: La Navarraise (Domingo, Milnes, Zaccaria; Henry Lewis, 1975) RCA Red Seal
- Meyerbeer: Le prophète (Scotto, McCracken, Hines; Henry Lewis, 1976) Sony
- Mozart: Don Giovanni (Sutherland, Lorengar, Krenn, Bacquier, Gramm; Richard Bonynge, 1968) Decca
- Ponchielli: La Gioconda (Tebaldi, Dominguez, Bergonzi, Merrill; Lamberto Gardelli, 1967) Decca
- Puccini: Suor Angelica (Scotto, Cotrubaș; Lorin Maazel, 1976) Sony
- Rossini: Il barbiere di Siviglia (Barbacini, Nucci, Dara, Ramey; Riccardo Chailly, 1982) Sony
- Rossini: Bianca e Falliero (Ricciarelli, Merritt; Donato Renzetti, 1986) [live] Fonit Cetra
- Rossini: L'italiana in Algeri (Battle, Ramey; Scimone, 1980) Erato/ RCA Red Seal
- Rossini: Semiramide (Sutherland, Rouleau; Richard Bonynge, 1965/66) Decca
- Rossini: Tancredi (Cuberli, Zaccaria; Ralf Weikert, 1982) Sony
- Roussel: Padmâvatî (Gedda, van Dam; Michel Plasson, 1982/83) EMI
- Thomas: Mignon (Welting, von Stade, Vanzo, Zaccaria; Antonio de Almeida, 1977) Sony. For details, see here
- Verdi: Falstaff (Sweet, Lopardo, Panerai, Titus; Colin Davis, 1991) RCA Red Seal
- Verdi: Requiem (Sutherland, Pavarotti, Talvela; Georg Solti, 1967) Decca
- Verdi: Il trovatore (Sutherland, Horne, Pavarotti, Wixell, Ghiaurov; Richard Bonynge, 1976) Decca
- Vivaldi: Orlando furioso (de los Ángeles, Valentini Terrani; Claudio Scimone, 1977) Erato

== Abridged videography ==
- Corigliano: The Ghosts of Versailles (Stratas, Fleming; Levine, Graham, 1992) [live] Deutsche Grammophon
- Rossini: L'italiana in Algeri (M.Merritt, Ahlstedt; Levine, Ponnelle, 1986) [live] Deutsche Grammophon
- Rossini: Semiramide (Anderson, Ramey; Conlon, Copley, 1990) [live] Kultur
- Verdi: Falstaff (Freni, Bonney, Lopardo, Plishka; Levine, Zeffirelli, 1992) [live] Deutsche Grammophon
- Vivaldi: Orlando furioso (Behr, Pizzi, 1989) [live] Kultur

== Awards and recognition ==
Horne received many honors during her career. A New York Times article by Harold C. Schonberg, in celebration of the Met's 100th anniversary in 1983, listed the greatest singers who had ever performed at the house and included Horne, the only one still actively singing at the time. She was awarded Yale University's Sanford Medal.

- Most Promising New Classical Recording Artist, 1964, 7th Annual Grammy Awards
- Handel Medallion, 1980
- Best Classical Vocal Soloist Performance, 1981, 24th Annual Grammy Awards
- Best Classical Vocal Soloist Performance, 1983, 26th Annual Grammy Awards
- Gold Medal of Merit from the National Society of Arts and Letters, 1987
- Best Opera Recording, 1993, 36th Annual Grammy Awards
- National Medal of Arts, 1992
- Commandeur de l'ordre des Arts et des Lettres, 1995
- Kennedy Center Honors, 1995
- Lifetime Achievement Grammy Award, 2021

== See also ==
- The Rossini Bicentennial Birthday Gala
- Thomas: Mignon (Antonio de Almeida recording)
- Marilyn Horne & Frederica von Stade: Lieder & Duets
- A Salute to American Music (Richard Tucker Music Foundation Gala XVI, 1991)
- The Metropolitan Opera Centennial Gala

== Sources ==
- Horne, Marilyn; Scovell, Jane (1983). Marilyn Horne: My Life. New York: Atheneum. ISBN 068911401X.
- Horne, Marilyn; Scovell, Jane (2004). Marilyn Horne: The Song Continues. Fort Worth, Texas: Baskerville Publishers. ISBN 1880909715.
