= Edo de Waart =

Dutch conductor (born 1941)

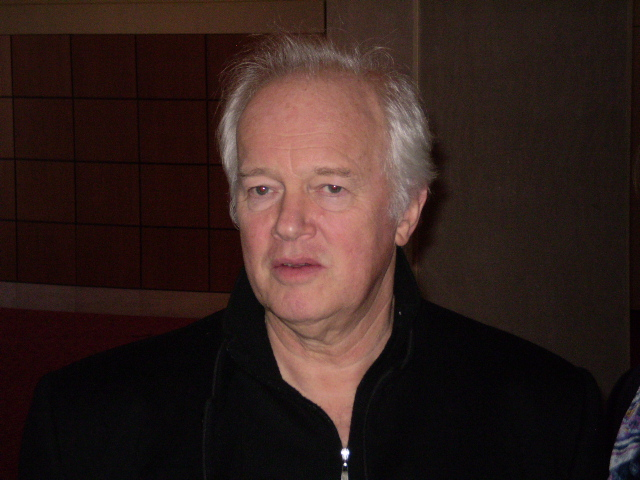
- De Waart in 2008
- Born: 1 June 1941 (age 85); Amsterdam
- Occupation: Conductor
- Years active: 1964-2024
- Spouse(s): Noor Terweij (m. 1962, div.); Roberta Alexander (m. 1970s, div. 1970s); Ruth Welting (m. 1970s, div.); Sheri Greenawald (m. 1980s, div.); Katherine Hilst; Rebecca Dopp (m. 1999 - present)
- Partner: Susan Graham (former)
- Children: 4

Edo de Waart (born 1 June 1941, Amsterdam) is a Dutch retired conductor. He is music director laureate of the Milwaukee Symphony Orchestra. De Waart is the former music director of the New Zealand Symphony Orchestra (2016–2019), chief conductor of the Royal Flemish Philharmonic (2011–2016) and artistic partner with the St. Paul Chamber Orchestra (2010–2014).

De Waart studied oboe, piano and conducting at the Sweelinck Conservatory, graduating in 1962. The following year, he was appointed associate principal oboe of the Royal Concertgebouw Orchestra.

== Professional career ==
=== Orchestral conducting ===
In 1964, at the age of 23, De Waart won the Dimitris Mitropoulos Conducting Competition in New York. As part of his prize, he served for one year as assistant conductor to Leonard Bernstein at the New York Philharmonic. On his return to the Netherlands, he was appointed assistant conductor of the Concertgebouw Orchestra under Bernard Haitink.

In 1967, he was appointed conductor of both the Netherlands Wind Ensemble and Rotterdam Philharmonic Orchestra, and was the latter's music director from 1973 to 1979.

De Waart made his début at the San Francisco Symphony in 1975. A year later, he became principal guest conductor, and from 1977 to 1985 he was its music director. From 1986 to 1995, he was music director of the Minnesota Orchestra.

In 1989, De Waart returned to the Netherlands, where he was appointed music director of the Netherlands Radio Philharmonic. He resigned from the post in 2004 and subsequently took the title of conductor laureate of the orchestra.

De Waart became chief conductor and artistic adviser of the Sydney Symphony Orchestra in 1993, and served in the post until 2003. While in Sydney, De Waart made no secret of his dislike of the acoustics of the Sydney Opera House Concert Hall, the orchestra's home, saying, "if there is no clear intention to do something to improve the hall, then we really seriously have to look at another venue". In 2004, De Waart became artistic director and chief conductor of the Hong Kong Philharmonic Orchestra. He concluded his Hong Kong tenure in 2012.

In January 2008, De Waart was named music director of the Milwaukee Symphony Orchestra, and he assumed the post in September 2009. In March 2008, the Saint Paul Chamber Orchestra announced De Waart as an Artistic Partner with the orchestra for the 2010–11 season. In April 2010, the Milwaukee Symphony Orchestra announced the extension of De Waart's contract through the 2016–17 season. In the same month, the Royal Flemish Philharmonic (deFilharmonie) announced De Waart's appointment as chief conductor for six seasons beginning in 2012. He formally began his chief conductorship of deFilharmonie (now: Antwerp Symphony Orchestra) in 2011, a year earlier than originally scheduled. In November 2014, deFilharmonie announced that De Waart's tenure as chief conductor would conclude after the 2015–2016 season. In February 2015, the Milwaukee Symphony announced the conclusion of De Waart's music directorship after the 2016–2017 season. He now has the title of conductor laureate of the Milwaukee Symphony.

In June 2015, the New Zealand Symphony Orchestra announced the appointment of De Waart as its next music director. He led his first concerts as NZSO music director in March 2016. He conducted his final concerts as NZSO music director in November 2019, and took the title of music director laureate in 2020.

In January 2015, De Waart first guest-conducted the San Diego Symphony. In January 2019, the orchestra announced the appointment of De Waart as its first-ever principal guest conductor, effective with the 2019–2020 season.

On 10 April 2024, De Waart announced his retirement.

=== Opera ===
De Waart was a frequent conductor of opera, making his first appearance at the Santa Fe Opera in 1971, in a production of The Flying Dutchman. He debuted at the Houston Grand Opera in 1975, the Royal Opera House, Covent Garden in 1976, and the Bayreuth Festspielhaus in 1979. From 1970, he conducted Netherlands Opera (DNO) frequently. In 1980, he directed a Ring cycle at the San Francisco Opera.

In March 2002, De Waart announced his departure in 2004 as chief conductor of the DNO, a position he had occupied since 1999. In giving his reason for leaving, De Waart mentioned his desire to spend time with his two small children. But in an interview with the newspaper Trouw he also mentioned his disagreement with DNO director Pierre Audi's conceptual staging of Lohengrin and Robert Wilson's planned Madama Butterfly, saying he missed "humanity" and "emotion in the direction."

In July 2007, Santa Fe Opera named De Waart their chief conductor, effective 1 October 2007. His initial contract was for four years, during which time he conducted the 2008 production of Billy Budd. However, in November 2008, Santa Fe Opera announced De Waart's resignation, to occur before the end of his contract, no earlier than the end of the 2009 season. De Waart cited health and family reasons for this decision.

=== Repertoire ===
An avid promoter of contemporary music, De Waart led premieres of works by John Adams, whose opera Nixon in China he has recorded; Steve Reich, whose Variations for Winds, Strings and Keyboards he has recorded; and others in San Francisco. Ellen Taaffe Zwilich's Symphony No. 2 is dedicated to him.

== Recordings ==
De Waart's recording catalog is extensive, encompassing recordings with such labels as Philips and orchestras such as the Royal Concertgebouw Orchestra, Rotterdam Philharmonic Orchestra, Netherlands Radio Philharmonic, Sydney Symphony Orchestra, Minnesota Orchestra, and San Francisco Symphony.

=== Selected discography ===
- Frederica von Stade sings Mozart and Rossini Arias, with the Rotterdam Philharmonic Orchestra, Philips, 1976
- Richard Strauss: Der Rosenkavalier, with Jules Bastin, José Carreras, Derek Hammond-Stroud, Evelyn Lear, Frederica von Stade, Ruth Welting and the Rotterdam Philharmonic Orchestra, Philips, 1977
- Respighi: Pini Di Roma, Fontane Di Roma, Gli Uccelli. Philips 1981–1982, Davies Hall, San Francisco.

== Honours ==
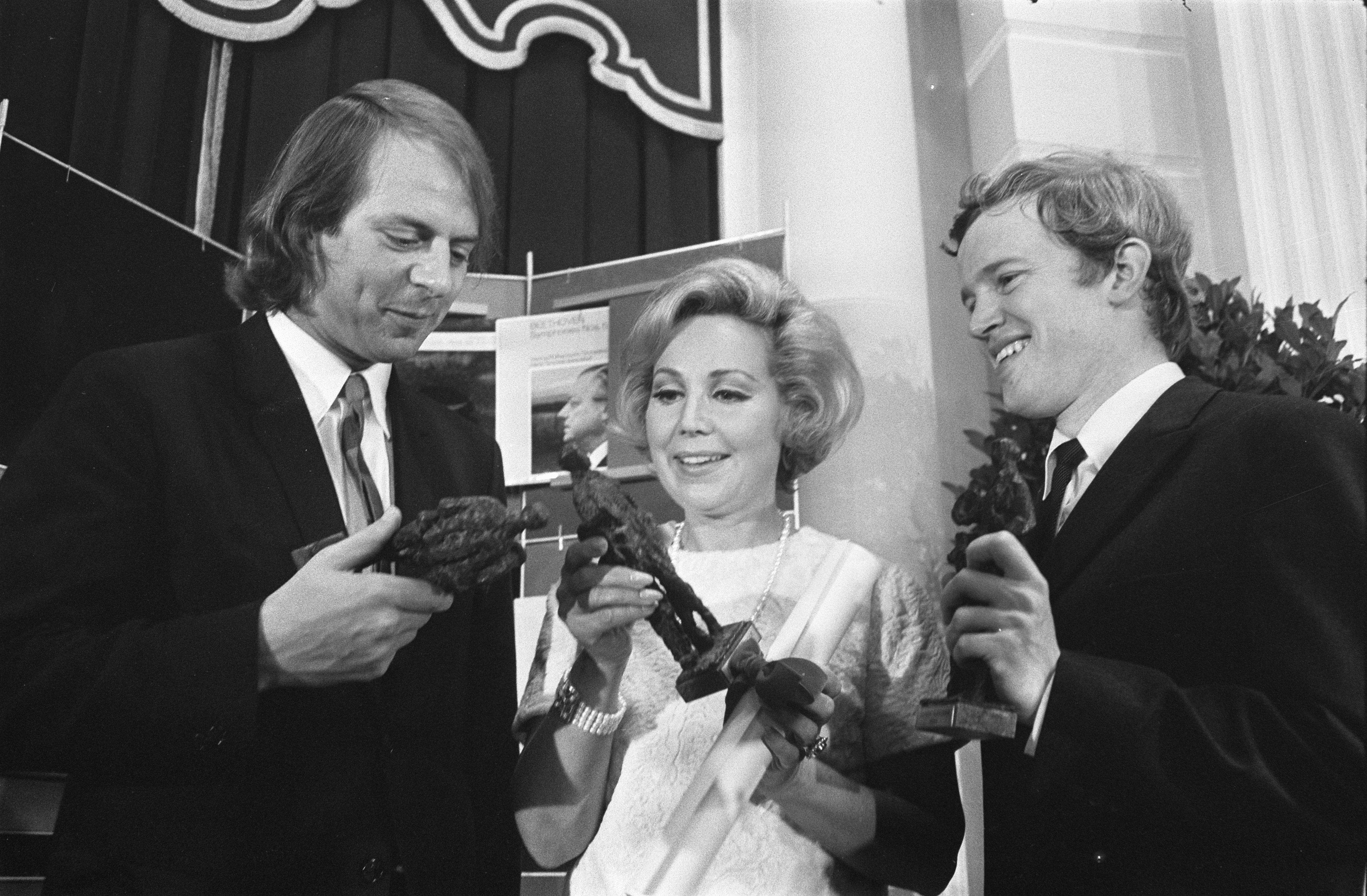
De Waart (right) with Karlheinz Stockhausen and Anneliese Rothenberger, receiving the Dutch Edison music awards in 1969.

In January 2001, De Waart was awarded the Australian Centenary Medal "for service to Australian society and the advancement of music". In May 2005, he was appointed an Honorary Officer of the Order of Australia "for service to Australia, particularly as Chief Conductor and Artistic Director of the Sydney Symphony Orchestra". He is a knight in the Order of the Netherlands Lion.

== Personal life ==
De Waart and his sixth wife, Rebecca Dopp, live in Maple Bluff, Wisconsin, near Dopp's hometown of Middleton. They married in 1999 and have two children: a son, Sebastiaan, and a daughter, Olivia. The family previously lived in Hong Kong but moved to accommodate Sebastiaan's asthma. De Waart and his first wife, Noor Terweij, had two children, Boris and Marjolein. He was also formerly married to Roberta Alexander, Sheri Greenawald, Katherine Hilst, and Ruth Welting. He was in a relationship with Susan Graham for six years.

Cultural offices
Preceded by Jean Fournet	Principal Conductor, Rotterdam Philharmonic Orchestra; 1973–1979	Succeeded by David Zinman
Preceded by Sergiu Comissiona	Principal Conductor, Radio Filharmonisch Orkest; 1995–2004	Succeeded by Jaap van Zweden
Preceded by Hartmut Haenchen	Chief Conductor, De Nederlandse Opera; 1999–2004	Succeeded by Ingo Metzmacher
Preceded by Samuel Wong	Artistic Director & Chief Conductor, Hong Kong Philharmonic Orchestra; 2004–2012	Succeeded by Jaap van Zweden
Preceded by Kenneth Montgomery (interim music director)	Chief Conductor, Santa Fe Opera; 2007–2009	Succeeded by Frédéric Chaslin
Preceded by Andreas Delfs	Music Director, Milwaukee Symphony Orchestra; 2009–2017	Succeeded by Ken-David Masur
Preceded by Jaap van Zweden	Chief Conductor, DeFilharmonie; 2011–2016	Succeeded by Elim Chan
Preceded by Pietari Inkinen	Music Director, New Zealand Symphony Orchestra; 2016–2019	Succeeded by Gemma New (principal conductor)
