= Mignon =

Opera by Ambroise Thomas

- Opera by Ambroise Thomas
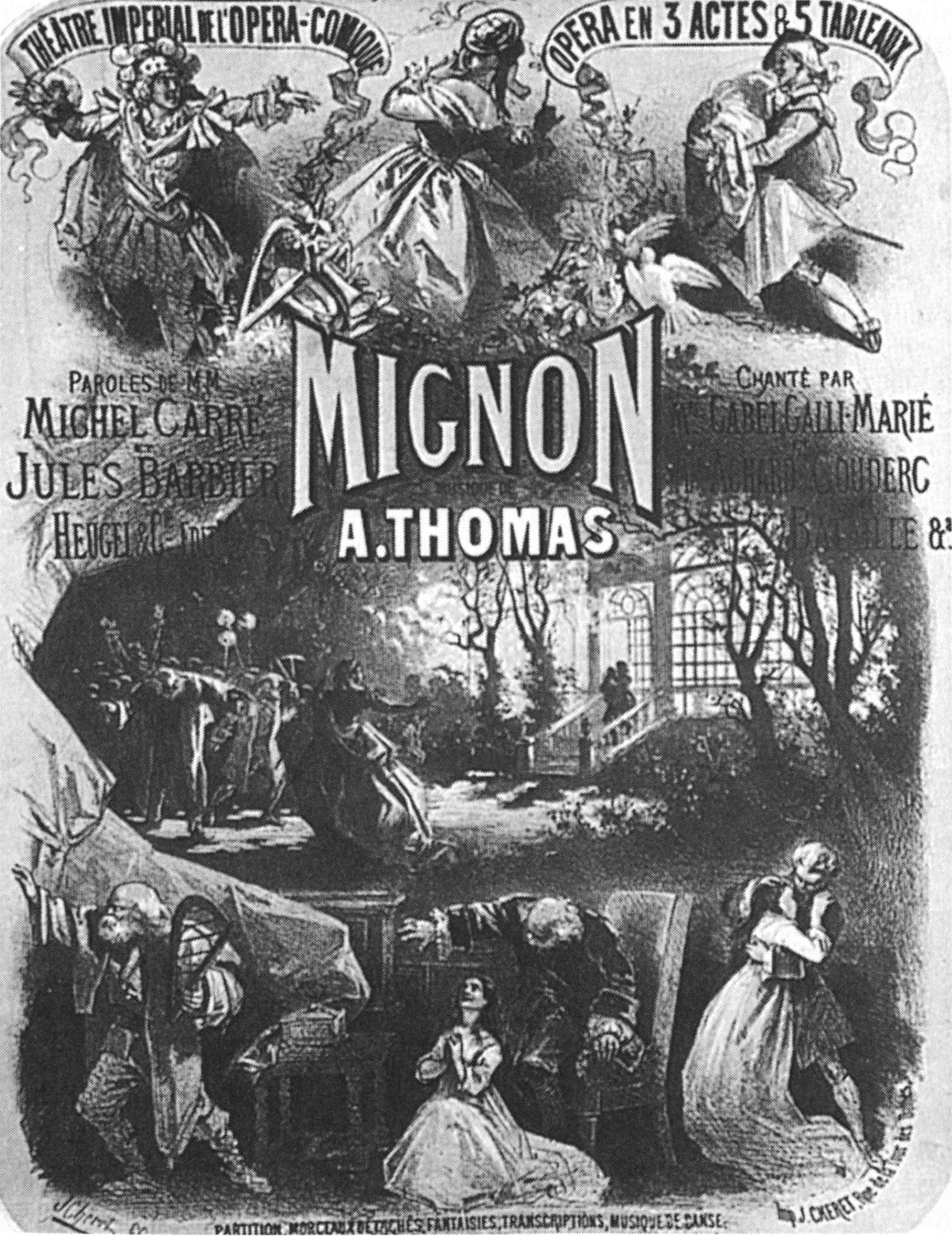
- Poster for the premiere, by Jules Chéret
- Librettist: Jules Barbier; Michel Carré
- Language: French
- Based on: Wilhelm Meisters Lehrjahre by Goethe
- Premiere: 17 November 1866; Opéra-Comique, Paris

Mignon (French pronunciation: [miɲɔ̃]) is an 1866 opéra comique (or opera in its second version) in three acts by Ambroise Thomas. The original French libretto was by Jules Barbier and Michel Carré, based on Goethe's 1795-96 novel Wilhelm Meisters Lehrjahre. The Italian version was translated by Giuseppe Zaffira. The opera is mentioned in James Joyce's "The Dead" (in Dubliners) and Willa Cather's The Professor's House. Thomas's goddaughter Mignon Nevada was named after the main character. The aria “I am Titania” was used repeatedly in the British feature film The Life and Death of Colonel Blimp.

== Performance history ==
The first performance was at the Opéra-Comique in Paris on 17 November 1866. The piece proved popular: more than 100 performances took place by the following July, the 1,000th was given there on 13 May 1894, and the 1,500th on 25 May 1919.

The opera was also adapted and translated into German for performance in Berlin with Madame Lucca as Mignon. Lucca was well received, but the German critics were unhappy with the opera's alterations to the Goethe original, so Thomas composed a shorter finale with a tragic ending, in which Mignon falls dead in the arms of Wilhelm. This ending was an attempt to make the story of the opera somewhat more similar in tone to the tragic outcome of Goethe's. (The original version of Mignon for the Opéra-Comique had to have a happy ending, since at that time in Paris tragic operas in French were exclusively reserved for the Opéra.) Unsurprisingly, this "Version allemande" still failed to satisfy the German critics and proved to be a futile endeavour. As Henry Edward Krehbiel describes it, the "Mignon of Carré and Barbier bears little more than an external resemblance to the Mignon of Goethe, and to kill her is wanton cruelty."

Despite his success in Paris with the French version, Thomas was asked to revise the work for the first performance at the Drury Lane Theatre in London on 5 July 1870. This version was given in Italian with recitatives (instead of spoken dialogue). The role of Mignon, originally for mezzo-soprano, was sung by a soprano (Christina Nilsson), and the role of Frédéric, originally a tenor, was sung by a contralto (Zelia Trebelli-Bettini). A second verse was added to Lothario's aria in the first act ("Fugitif et tremblant" in the French version), and in the second act, a rondo-gavotte for Frédéric ("Me voici dans son boudoir") was devised using the music of the entr'acte preceding that act, to satisfy Mme Trebelli-Bettini, who was discomfited by having to take on a role originally written for a buffo tenor. Apparently, the coloratura soprano Elisa Volpini, who was to sing Philine, felt that her aria at the end of the second act ("Je suis Titania") was insufficient, and another florid aria ("Alerte, alerte, Philine!") was inserted after the second act entr'acte and before Laerte's 6/8 Allegretto ("Rien ne vaut"). The finale was also much shortened. Philine's extra aria appears to have either never been orchestrated, or the orchestration was lost or destroyed. (Most sources say that the aria was performed and not cut from the Drury Lane production, implying that Thomas must have orchestrated it.) The aria is known from several piano-vocal scores and is included as an appendix, sung by Ruth Welting with flute and harpsichord accompaniment, as part of the 1978 recording with Marilyn Horne as Mignon. The recording also includes a second appendix with the original, longer version of the finale.

The United States premiere was given on 9 May 1871 at the French Opera House in New Orleans. This was followed by a Maurice Strakosch production in Italian at the New York Academy of Music on 22 November 1871 with Christine Nilsson as Mignon, Mlle. Léon Duval as Philine, Victor Capoul as Wilhelm, and Mlle. Ronconi as Frédéric. The substantial success of the opera in London and New York has been attributed to the presence of Christine Nilsson in both productions. Nilsson also performed the role at the Metropolitan Opera in New York in 1883.

The versions of the opera performed outside France, in particular, those in the United States and Italy, have been in Italian (later also in French), with Mignon as a soprano or mezzo-soprano, and Frédéric as a mezzo-soprano or contralto, and with the sung recitatives and the shortened finale. More recently, in 1986, the original opéra comique version with soprano Cynthia Clarey as Mignon was revived for a production at the Wexford Festival Opera.

Noted soprano interpreters of Mignon have included Emma Albani (Covent Garden's first Mignon in 1874), Lucrezia Bori, and Geraldine Farrar; mezzo-sopranos have included Marilyn Horne, Giulietta Simionato, Frederica von Stade, Risë Stevens, and Ebe Stignani. Lily Pons was famous for singing Philine.

== Roles ==
Role	Voice type	Premiere cast, 17 November 1866 (Conductor: Théophile Tilmant)	Second version cast, 5 July 1870 (Conductor: Luigi Arditi)
Mignon	mezzo-soprano (1866) soprano (1870)	Célestine Galli-Marié	Christina Nilsson
Philine, an actress	coloratura soprano	Marie Cabel	Elisa Volpini
Wilhelm Meister, a student	tenor	Léon Achard	Alessandro Bettini
Frédéric, Philine's admirer	tenor (1866) contralto (1870)	Bernard Voisy	Zelia Trebellii
Laerte, an actor	tenor	Joseph-Antoine-Charles Couderc	Edouard Gassier
Lothario, a wandering minstrel	bass	Eugène Bataille	Jean-Baptiste Faure
Jarno, a gypsy	bass	François Bernard	Signor Raguer
Antonio, a castle servant	bass	Davoust	Giovanni Volpini?
Chorus: Townspeople, peasants, gypsies, guests, actors

== Instrumentation ==
The opera is scored for piccolo, flute, two oboes, two clarinets, two bassoons, four horns, two trumpets, three trombones, timpani, triangle, cymbals, bass drum, tambourine, harp and strings.

== Synopsis ==
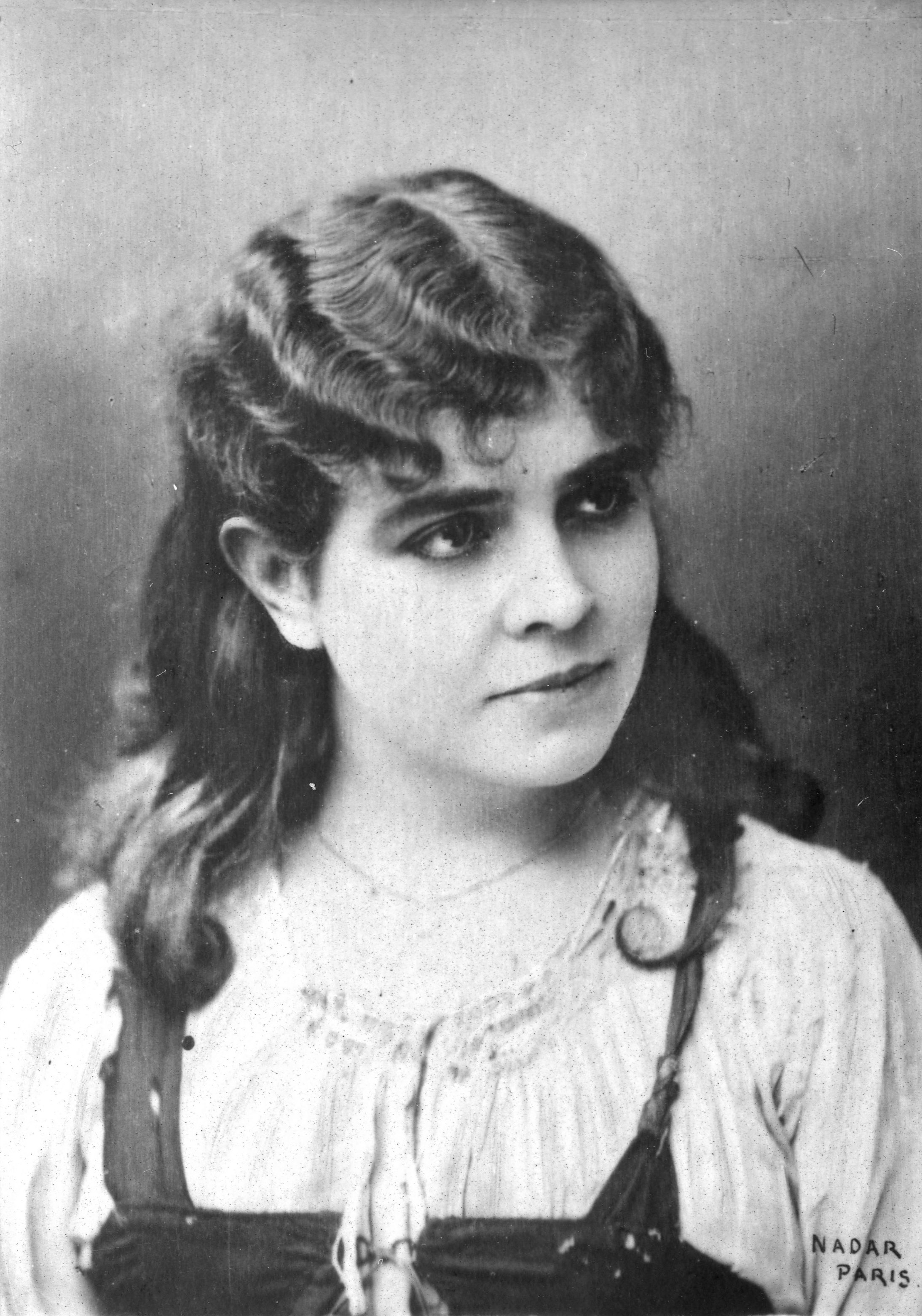
Célestine Galli-Marié created the role of Mignon at the première.

Connais-tu le pays
sung by Adelina Patti in 1906

Time: End of the 18th century.
Place: Germany and Italy.

=== Act 1 ===
In the courtyard of an inn in a small German town, the wandering minstrel Lothario sings and the Gypsies dance while the townspeople watch and drink. Jarno threatens Mignon with a stick when she refuses to dance, but Lothario and Wilhelm Meister come to her aid. She thanks them and divides her bouquet of wildflowers between them. Wilhelm and Laerte have a drink together. Philine and Laerte leave, after he gives her his flowers from Mignon. Mignon tells Wilhelm she was captured by Gypsies as a child. Wilhelm decides to purchase Mignon’s freedom. Lothario comes to say goodbye to Mignon. Lothario wants Mignon to travel with him, but she stays with Wilhelm. Frédéric lovingly follows Philine in, but she also wants Wilhelm. The acting troupe is about to set off for a baron's castle after receiving an invitation to perform there. Mignon is deeply in love with Wilhelm, but upset to see the flowers that she gave him in the hands of Philine.

=== Act 2 ===
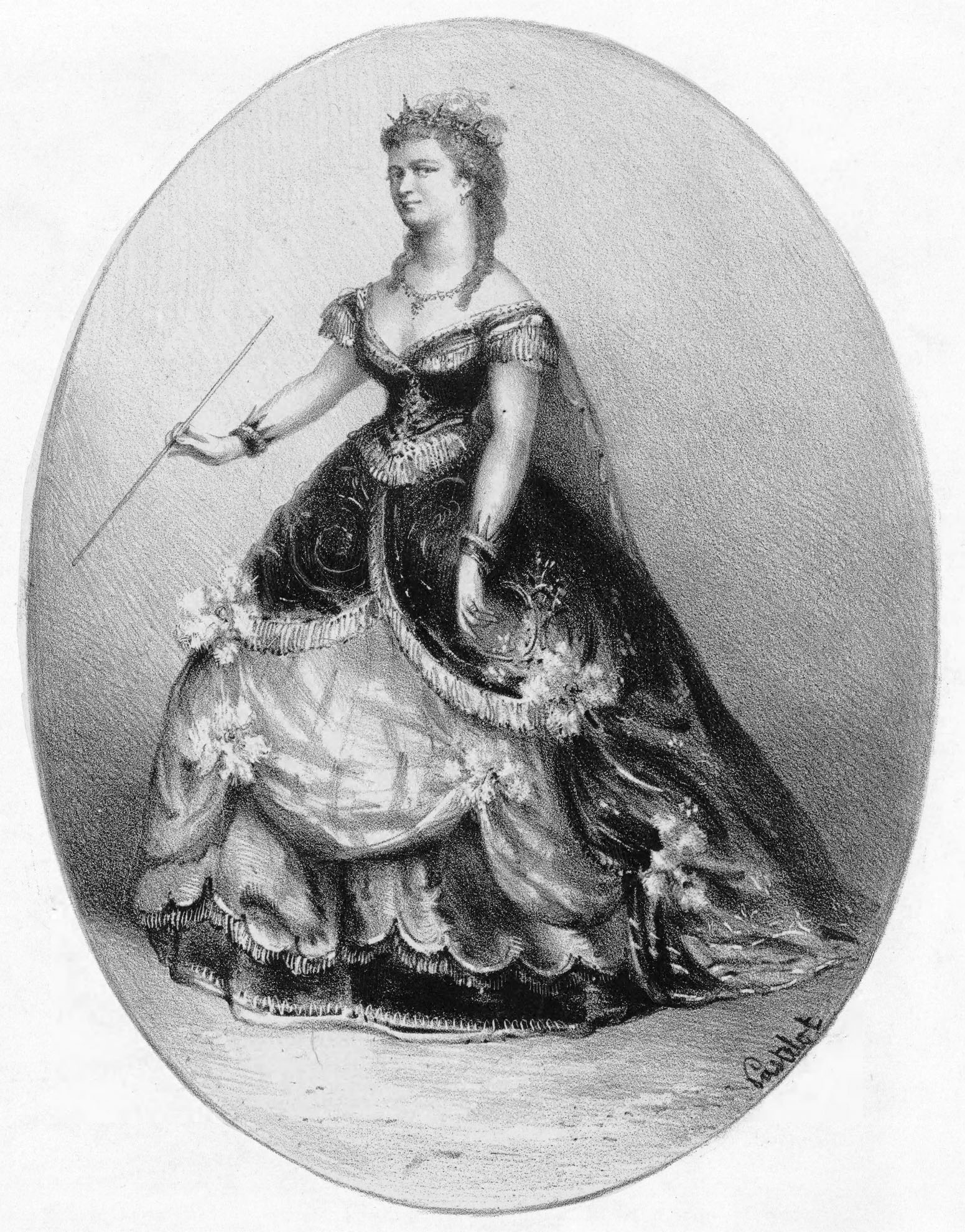
Marie Cabel as Philine

In Philine’s room in the baron's castle, Philine is elated, living in the luxury and charming the baron. Laerte is heard outside, praising Philine. Wilhelm and Mignon enter. She pretends to sleep while Wilhelm and Philine sing. When the couple leave, Mignon tries on Philine’s costumes and make-up. She is jealous and exits. Frédéric enters. When Wilhelm returns for Mignon he is confronted by Frédéric. Mignon rushes in to break up their impending fight. Wilhelm decides that he cannot stay with Mignon and says goodbye to her. He leaves arm-in-arm with a jubilant Philine. Later, in the courtyard of the castle, Mignon is consumed by a jealous rage, when she hears Lothario playing the harp. He comforts the girl. Philine's portrayal of Titania in A Midsummer Night's Dream is applauded in the conservatory. Mignon, in jealousy, shouts that she wishes the building would catch fire and runs out. Lothario hears her and moves toward the conservatory. After Mignon returns, Wilhelm receives her so warmly that Philine, now jealous, sends her to fetch the wildflowers in the conservatory. Wilhelm rushes to save Mignon from the fire that Lothario had set to please her, carrying her unconscious body out of the conservatory with the singed flowers still in her hand.

=== Act 3 ===
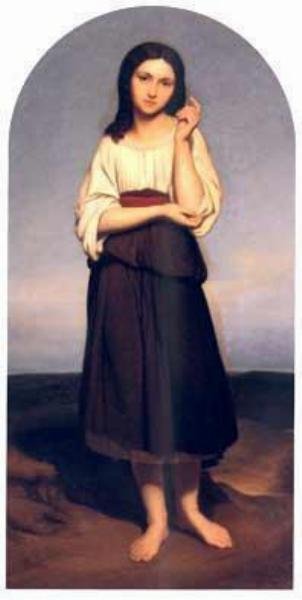
Mignon verlangende naar haar vaderland, by Ary Scheffer, 1836 (Dordrechts Museum)

Wilhelm has brought Mignon and Lothario to a castle in Italy which he considers buying. There an old man watches over Mignon and prays for her recovery. Antonio relates how the castle’s previous owner had gone mad after his wife had died of grief over the loss of their young daughter. Wilhelm decides to buy the castle for Mignon because it has so speeded her recovery. Mignon awakens and confesses to Wilhelm of her love for this strangely familiar place. He finally realizes that he loves her deeply and resists Philine’s attempts to win him back. Lothario re-enters and informs the couple that he is the owner of the castle and that returning here has restored his sanity. After reading a prayer found in a book in the house, Mignon realizes that she is his daughter Sperata. The three embrace happily.

==== Noted arias ====
- "Oui, je veux par le monde (Yes, I want the world)" (Wilhelm, a tenor)
- "Connais-tu le pays? (Do you know the country?)" (Mignon, a mezzo-soprano or a soprano)
- "Adieu, Mignon! (Farewell, Mignon!)" (Wilhelm, a tenor)
- "Je suis Titania (I am Titania)" (Philine, a coloratura soprano)
- "Elle ne croyait pas (She did not believe)" (Wilhelm, a tenor)
- "Me voici dans son boudoir (Here I am in her boudoir)" (Frédéric, a tenor or a contralto)

== Recordings ==
- 1945 - Risë Stevens (Mignon), Mimi Benzell (Philine), James Melton (Wilhelm Meister), Ezio Pinza (Lothario), Donald Dame (Laerte), Lucielle Browning (Frédéric) - Metropolitan Opera Chorus and Orchestra, Wilfred Pelletier - Broadcast January 27, 1945– (Sony)
- 1953 - Geneviève Moizan (Mignon), Janine Micheau (Philine), Libero de Luca (Wilhelm Meister), René Bianco (Lothario), Robert Destaing (Laerte), François Louis Deschamps (Frédéric), Noël Pierotte (Jarno) - Choeur et Orchestre du Théâtre National de Belgique, Georges Sébastian - (Preiser)
- 1977 - Huguette Tourangeau (Mignon), Noelle Rogers (Philine), Henri Wilden (Wilhelm Meister), Pierre Charbonneau (Lothario), Antonio de Almeida Santos (Laerte), Michael Philip Davis (Frédéric), Edgar Hanson (Jarno) - Vancouver Opera Chorus and Orchestra, Richard Bonynge - CBC Broadcast January 29, 1977– (BJR Enterprises Inc. - Bella Voce Records)
- 1977 - Marilyn Horne (Mignon), Ruth Welting (Philine), Alain Vanzo (Wilhelm Meister), Nicola Zaccaria (Lothario), André Battedou (Laerte), Frederica von Stade (Frédéric), Claude Méloni (Jarno) - Ambrosian Opera Chorus, Philharmonia Orchestra, Antonio de Almeida - (CBS) For details, see here
