= Mignon (Antonio de Almeida recording) =

- Sony CD: SM3K 34590

Studio album by Antonio de Almeida
- Released: 1978
- Studio: All Saints' Church, Tooting Graveney, London
- Genre: Opera
- Length: 194:55
- Language: French
- Label: CBS Masterworks
- Producer: Paul Myers

Mignon
- The Sony Opera House reissue, 2009

Mignon is a 194-minute studio album of Ambroise Thomas's opera, performed by André Battedou, Marilyn Horne, Paul Hudson, Claude Méloni, Frederica von Stade, Alain Vanzo, Ruth Welting and Nicola Zaccaria with the Ambrosian Opera Chorus and the Philharmonia Orchestra under the direction of Antonio de Almeida. It was released in 1978.

== Background ==
Thomas wrote several different versions of Mignon. For productions in Germany, he composed a new, tragic finale more in keeping with the Goethe novel on which the opera's libretto was based. For a production in London's Drury Lane in 1870, he made more comprehensive alterations. Firstly, the finale was shortened. Secondly, dialogue was replaced by recitative. Thirdly, Lothario's Act 1 aria acquired an extra verse. Fourthly, Philine was given an extra aria, inserted after the Act 2 entr'acte. And finally, Frédéric was changed from a buffo tenor into a contralto, and was awarded his Act 2 Gavotte to appease the singer who was to perform the regendered role. The version of the opera presented on de Almeida's album largely follows Thomas's 1870 edition, except that Philine's insert aria – for which the original orchestration has been lost – is consigned to an appendix, where its accompaniment is provided by a harpsichord and a flute. A further appendix presents the longer, original version of the opera's finale. (The finale that Thomas composed for German consumption is not included.) With the exception of the finale, every number for which Thomas composed more than one version is presented in the longest variant extant.

The album was only the second complete recording of the opera committed to disc, and the first to be taped stereophonically.

== Recording ==
The album was recorded using analogue technology between 20 June and 18 July 1977 in All Saints' Church, Tooting Graveney, London. It was prepared for reissue on CD using 20-bit remastering.

== Packaging ==
The cover of the LP version of the album was designed under the art direction of Allan Weinberg and featured a photograph by Sarah Moon. The cover of the CD version, identical to the LP's apart from minor additional lettering, was designed under the art direction of Roxanne Slimak.

== Critical reception ==
=== Reviews ===
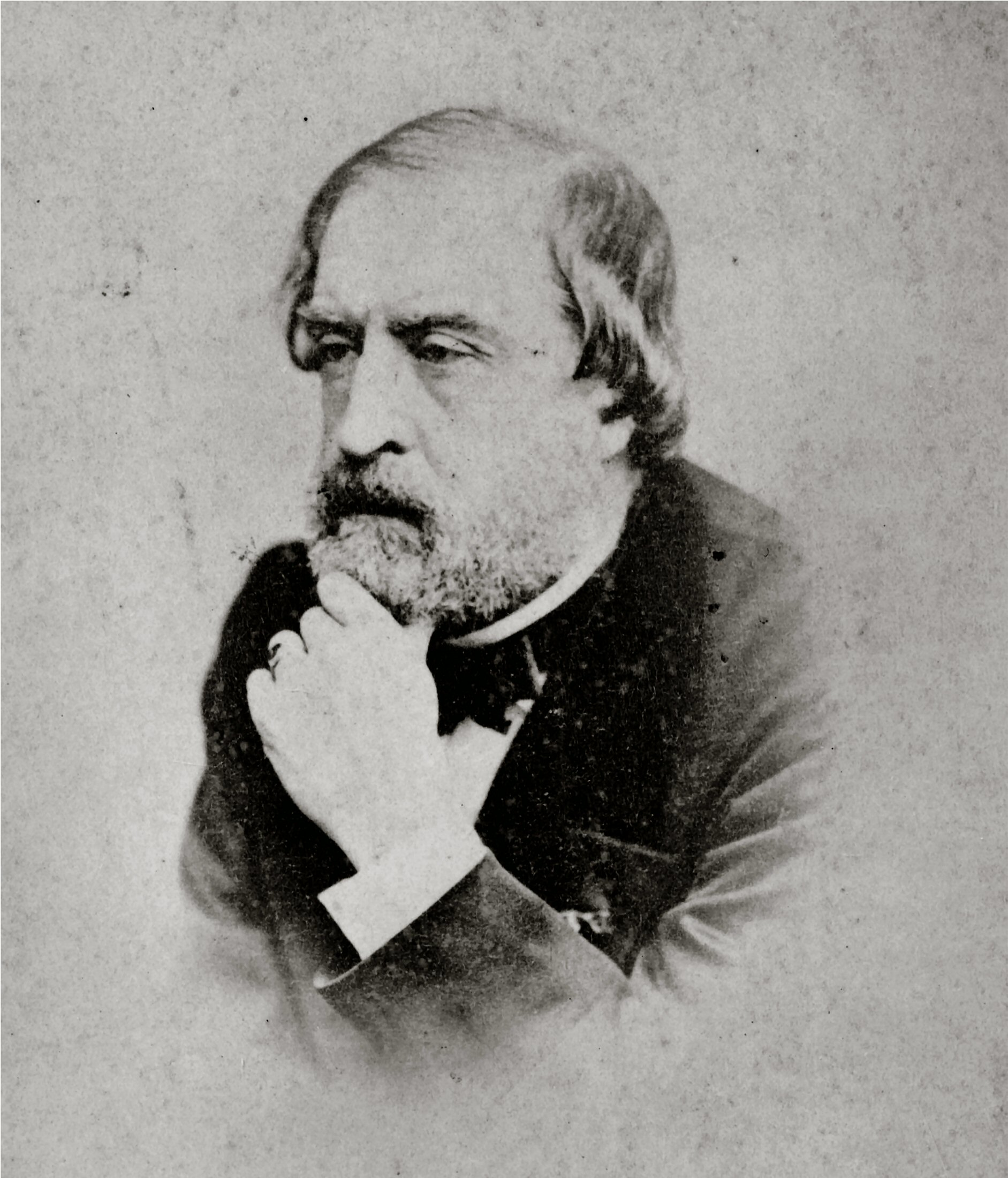
Ambroise Thomas in 1865, a year before Mignon's première

Alan Blyth reviewed the album on LP in Gramophone in October 1978. Marilyn Horne's performance in the title role was impressive, he thought, but not ideal. Yes, she had the coloratura skills needed for her Styrienne. Yes, she had the requisite breath control for a slow-paced "Connais-tu le pays?" And yes, she was compelling in the Act 2 scene in which Mignon was brought to the brink of suicide by her hopeless misery over Wilhelm's crush on Philine. But her reminiscence of home lacked the pathos and "dream-like nostalgia" that Conchita Supervia had found in it. Her decision to essay a role that lay somewhat high for her low mezzo-soprano meant that her singing sometimes sounded laboured. And her "big and full" tone could be a "little too aggressive" for a character as unassuming as Mignon. Ruth Welting, by contrast, was ideally cast as an "enchanting" Philine, bringing "just the right coquettish charm" to the role of the happy-go-lucky actress. Welting sang with the "light insouciance" of the great French soubrettes of yesteryear, and delivered her coloratura and trills with an expert, irresistible brilliance. As Frédéric, Frederica von Stade sang "breezily and cleanly" in her dance through his famous Gavotte. Her "delightfully fresh and liquid sound" made Blyth wonder how she would have fared if CBS had allotted Mignon to her instead of to Horne. Alain Vanzo, "elegant and involved", was blessed with exactly the right type of voice for Wilhelm, and his versions of the student's showpiece arias were in no way inferior to those recorded by even the most revered tenors of Mignon's heyday. The veteran Nicola Zaccaria, finally, mined every last nugget of gold from the part of Mignon's father, "a gift of a part for a warm bass". Zaccaria's age meant that his top notes were poorly focused, and he mishandled Lothario's Berceuse, but he came across as invariably endearing. For the rest, no-one was likely to mistake the Ambrosian Singers for Francophones, but the orchestra sounded as though they would have been at home in the pit of the Palais Garnier. Antonio de Almeida, evincing an obvious love for Thomas's music, erred only in not always choosing tempi judiciously. The album as a whole had only two drawbacks. Firstly, de Almeida's decision to use Thomas's recitatives rather than the libretto's original dialogue meant that the impact of the opera's mélodrames was lessened. Secondly, the album's engineering was disappointing. The sound was recessed, there was an irritating amount of reverberation and the singers seemed to be in a different acoustic from the orchestra. But these negatives should not deter people from investigating a commendable performance of what was, Blyth affirmed, "an attractive and sometimes first-rate score".

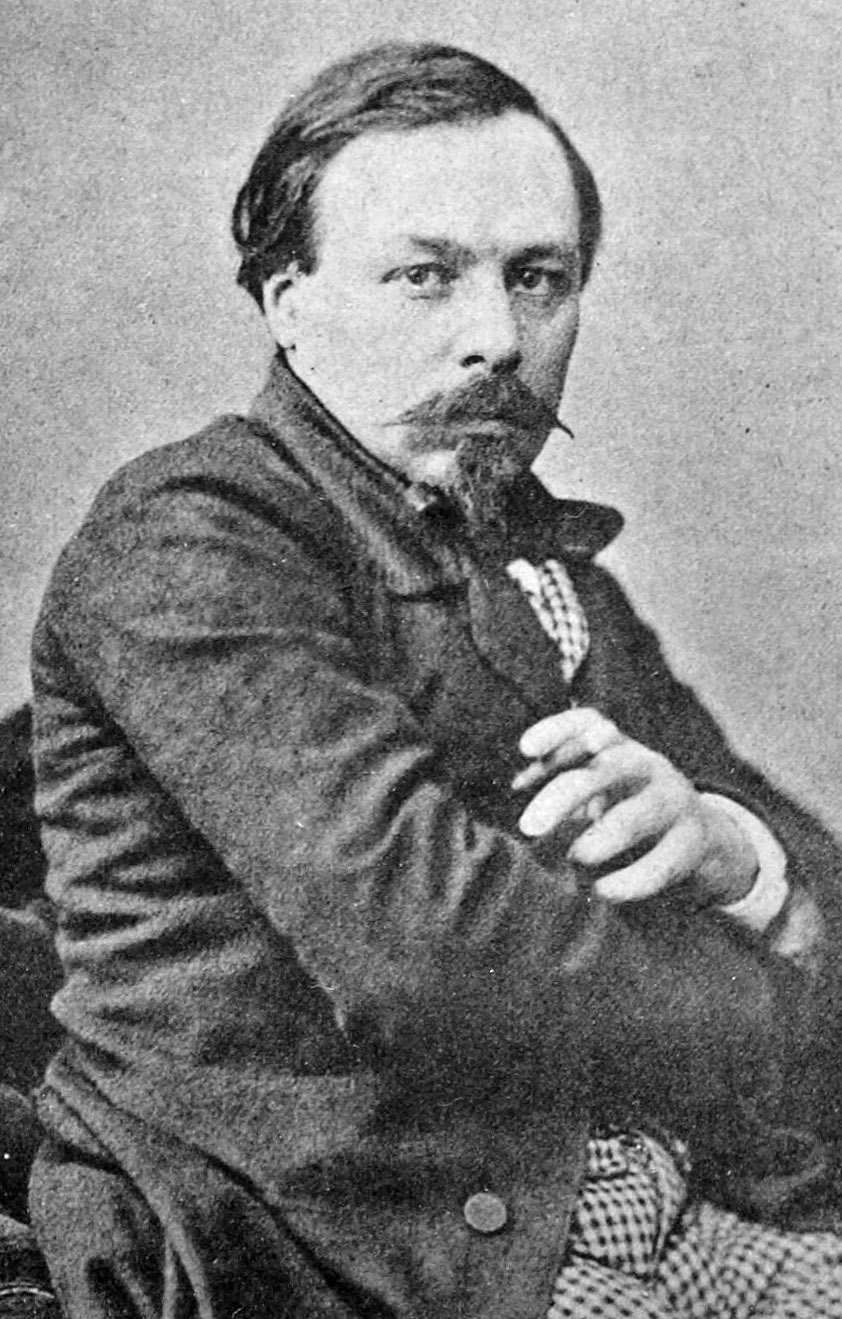
Librettist Michel Carré

George Jellinek reviewed the album on LP in Stereo Review in February 1979. Like Blyth, he acknowledged the many good things that Horne brought to the opera - her genius for vocal gymnastics, her dependable evenness of tone, her dramatic intensity in Mignon's Act 2 crisis. But, also like Blyth, he did not think that she was the right artist to portray a character of "naïveté and childlike simplicity". Confronted by a Mignon sung with a voice as mature and authoritative as hers, "credulity [was] severely tested in being asked to accept [her] as a forlorn waif". Fortunately, Horne's was the only casting that was questionable. Ruth Welting's Philine was "altogether excellent". Her Polonaise did not have as much devil-may-care élan as it might have done, but it was precise and it culminated in a firework of a high F. Frederica von Stade, admirable too, sang Frédéric's Gavotte with "lightness and charm". Alain Vanzo sang Wilhelm in a style that was authentically French: moreover, his lyric tenor had an instrumental purity, maintaining its quality even in its highest reaches. There was "tenderness as well as elegance" in his portrayal. As Lothario, Nicola Zaccaria compensated for the toll that old age had taken on his higher notes by singing evenly and touchingly. He made Mignon's father both believable and a man that one cared about. Antonio de Almeida gave the opera "an appropriately pastoral, fairy-tale aura through a sensitive and refined reading", although his conducting would have been even better with less of a bias towards tempi that trudged when they should have strode. The one point at which Jellinek disagreed with Blyth was over the album's engineering, which he judged to be good if not exceptionally so.

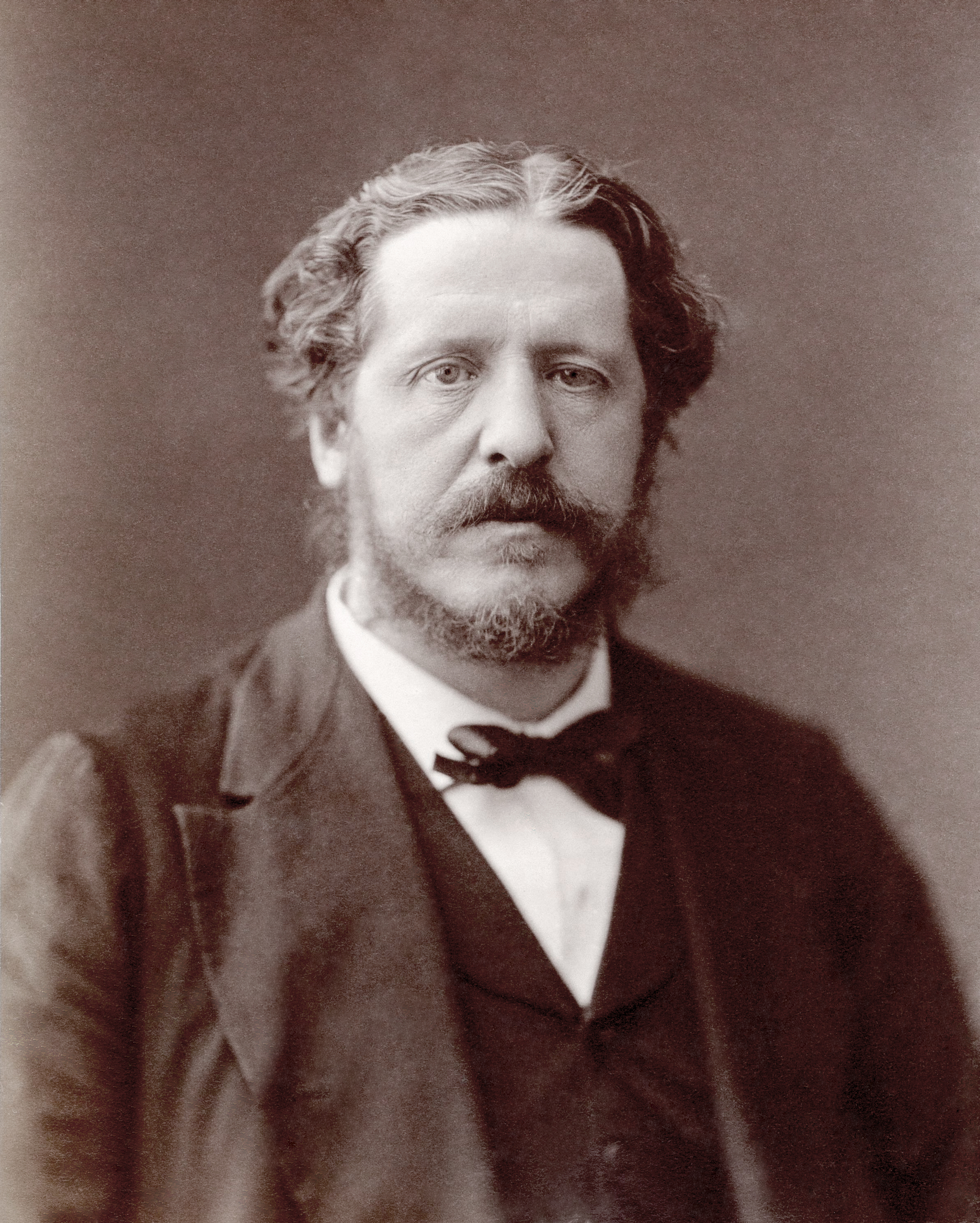
Librettist Jules Barbier

J. B. Steane reviewed the album on LP in Gramophone in July 1979, seeing eye to eye with Blyth and Jellinek in his critique of Marilyn Horne. Even though her voice was no longer all that it had been in its prime, her tone was still "quite exceptionally rich and gorgeous", "most lovely, for instance, in the velvety opening phrases of 'Connais-tu le pays?'" This said, her Mignon seldom sounded like the teenager that she was meant to be. Frederica von Stade made a success of Frédéric's gleeful Gavotte, and Ruth Welting, who had disappointed Steane when singing Sophie opposite von Stade's Octavian, pleased him better with a Philine who was precise and tidy. He did not find the album's male principals quite as praiseworthy as its women. Alain Vanzo, whom he thought the best French tenor of his era, seemed to sing some of Wilhelm's music with too much vim as though to ward off any perception that the character was rather puny. Nicola Zaccaria's voice, despite its consistency, could not help betraying the singer's advancing years. Antonio de Almeida's conducting, mostly appropriate, was flawed in sometimes delivering an adagio when an andantino was what was called for. The opera itself Steane thought good except at its very end, where Thomas had been unable to respond adequately to the dramatic demands of the story's climax. This lapse apart, it was "a delightful score, attractively orchestrated, full of grace and melody. I enjoyed it immensely."

=== Accolade ===
In February 1979, Stereo Review included the album in its list of Best Recordings of the Month.

== Track listing, CD1 ==
Ambroise Thomas (1811–1896)

Mignon, opéra en trois actes (Paris, 1866), with a libretto by Jules Barbier (1825–1901) and Michel Carré (1821–1872) after Wilhelm Meisters Lehrjahre ("Wilhelm Meister's apprenticeship", 1795–1796) by Johann Wolfgang von Goethe (1749–1832)

- 1 (8:03) Ouverture

Act One

- 2 (1:11) "Bons bourgeois et notables" (Townsfolk)
- 3 (4:48) "Fugitif et tremblant" (Lothario)
- 4 (1:36) "Place, amis, faites place!" (Peasants)
- 5 (4:18) "Laërte, ami Laërte, accourez au plus vite!" (Philine, Old Townsfolk, Laërte, Onlookers)
- 6 (4:08) "Pour gagner maintenant toute votre indulgence" (Jarno, Onlookers, Laërte, Philine, Mignon, Lothario)
- 7 (1:03) "Hola, coquin! Arrête" (Wilhelm, Jarno, Philine, Mignon)
- 8 (4:37) "Quel est, je veux le savoir" (Philine, Laërte, Wilhelm, Mignon, Lothario)
- 9 (2:04) "Monsieur!" (Laërte, Wilhelm)
- 10 (4:40) "Oui, je veux par le monde promener" (Wilhelm)
- 11 (1:40) "J'aime votre gaîté" (Laërte, Wilhelm)
- 12 (4:56) "Eh quoi! Mon cher Laërte" (Philine, Laërte, Wilhelm)
- 13 (1:23) "De mon ami, monsieur, excusez la folie" (Philine, Laërte, Wilhelm, Mignon)
- 14 (1:57) "Demain, dis tu?" (Mignon, Wilhelm)
- 15 (0:33) "Dis-moi de quelles plages lointaines" (Wilhelm)
- 16 (6:07) "Connais-tu le pays?" (Mignon)
- 17 (2:05) "Ce pays enchanté, n'est-ce pas l'Italie?" (Wilhelm, Mignon, Jarno, Lothario)
- 18 (3:02) "Légères hirondelles" (Mignon, Lothario)
- 19 (4:19) "Comment! C'est vous?" (Philine, Frédéric, Wilhelm, Jarno, Laërte)
- 20 (1:53) "Pourquoi pas!" (Wilhelm, Mignon)
- 21 (2:18) "Viens, la libre vie est douce!" (Lothario, Wilhelm, Mignon)
- 22 (2:19) "En route, amis, plions bagages" (Actors, Peasants, Townsfolk)
- 23 (6:36) "Qui m'aime me suive!" (Philine, Laërte, Actors, Wilhelm, Mignon, Townsfolk, Peasants, Gypsies, Lothario)

== Track listing, CD2 ==
Act Two

- 1 (2:13) Entr'acte
- 2 (1:40) "À merveille, j'en ris d'avance!" (Philine, Laërte)
- 3 (3:37) "Écoutez! Belle, avez pitié de nous!" (Laërte, Philine, Wilhelm, Mignon)
- 4 (2:42) "Plus de soucis, Mignon!" (Wilhelm, Mignon, Philine)
- 5 (5:10) "Ah! Je crois entendre les doux compliments" (Philine, Wilhelm, Mignon)
- 6 (2:11) "Me voilà seule hélas!" (Mignon)
- 7 (5:54) "Je connais un pauvre enfant" (Mignon)
- 8 (3:02) "C'est moi, j'ai tout brisé, n'importe, m'y voici!" (Frédéric)
- 9 (4:07) "Mignon! J'ai promis de me separer d'elle" (Wilhelm, Frédéric, Mignon)
- 10 (4:12) "Adieu, Mignon!" (Wilhelm)
- 11 (1:27) "Merci de tes bontés" (Mignon, Wilhelm)
- 12 (1:06) "Demain je serais loin!" (Mignon, Wilhelm)
- 13 (2:19) "Vous disiez vrai!" (Philine, Wilhelm, Laërte, Frédéric)
- 14 (2:02) Interlude
- 15 (4:56) "Elle est là, près de lui!" (Mignon)
- 16 (2:14) "Ciel! Qu'entends-je?" (Mignon, Lothario)
- 17 (4:12) "As-tu souffert" (Mignon, Lothario)
- 18 (1:14) "Ah! Bravo! La Philine est vraiment divine!" (All)
- 19 (0:47) "Oui, ce soir je suis la reine des fées" (Philine, Frédéric, Actors)
- 20 (4:59) "Je suis Titania" (Philine, Frédéric, Prince, Baron, All)
- 21 (4:13) "Ah! Vous voilà!" (Philine, Wilhelm, Frédéric, Lothario, Mignon, Laërte, All)

== Track listing, CD3 ==
Act Three

- 1 (3:26) "Ah! Au soufflé léger du vent" (Voices)
- 2 (5:20) "De son cœur, j'ai calmé la fièvre" (Lothario, Voices)
- 3 (3:28) "Vous verrez de cette fenêtre" (Antonio, Wilhelm, Lothario, Mignon)
- 4 (3:55) "Elle ne croyait pas dans sa candeur naïve" (Wilhelm)
- 5 (2:47) "Signor!" (Antonio, Wilhelm, Mignon)
- 6 (4:42) "Je suis heureuse" (Mignon, Wilhelm)
- 7 (2:55) "Je suis Titania" (Philine, Wilhelm, Mignon)
- 8 (1:28) "Ah! Malheureuse enfant!" (Wilhelm, Mignon)
- 9 (4:54) "Mignon! Wilhelm! Salut à vous!" (Lothario, Wilhelm, Mignon)
- 10 (3:38) "Ô Vierge Marie" (Mignon, Lothario, Wilhelm)
- 11 (2:35) "Elle revit!" (Wilhelm, Lothario, Mignon)

Appendix 1

Alternative opening to Act Two

- 12 (6:05) "À merveille! J'en ris d'avance!" (Philine)

Appendix 2

Alternative finale to Act Three

- 13 (9:32) "Dansons, dansons, amis, dansons!" (All, Philine, Frédéric, Mignon, Lothario, Wilhelm, Laërte, Antonio, Peasants)

== Personnel ==
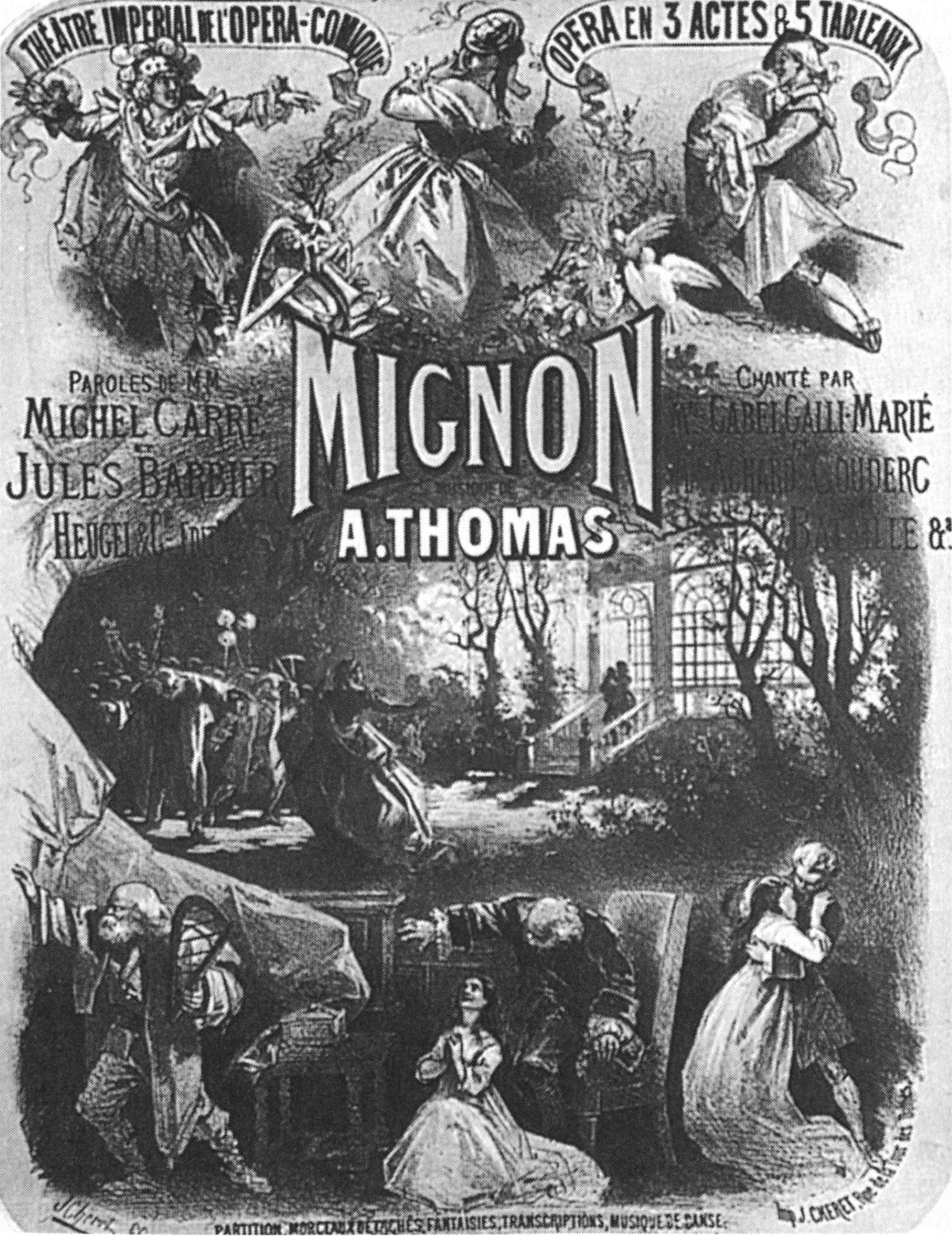
Jules Chéret's poster for Mignon's 1866 première

=== Performers ===
- Marilyn Horne (mezzo-soprano), Mignon
- Alain Vanzo (1928-2002, tenor), Wilhelm Meister, a student
- Ruth Welting, (1948-1999, soprano), Philine, an actress
- Frederica von Stade (mezzo-soprano), Frédéric, Philine's admirer
- Nicola Zaccaria (1923-2007, bass), Lothario, a wandering minstrel, Mignon's father
- André Battedou (tenor), Laërte, an actor
- Claude Méloni (baritone). Jarno, a gypsy
- Paul Hudson (bass), Antonio, a castle servant
- The Ambrosian Opera Chorus (chorus master: John McCarthy)
- The Philharmonia Orchestra
- Antonio de Almeida (1928-1997), conductor

=== Other ===
- Paul Walter Myers (1932-2015), producer
- Bob Auger, engineer
- Mike Ross-Trevor, engineer
- Louise de la Fuente, remastering producer
- Darcy Proper, remastering engineer

== Release history ==
In 1978, CBS Masterworks released the album as a set of four LPs (catalogue number M4 34590) with notes, texts and translations. The album was not released on cassette.

In 1988, Sony issued the album on CD (catalogue number SM3K 34590) with a 112-page booklet containing libretti, synopses and an essay by Barrymore Laurence Scherer in English, French, German and Italian, as well as photographs of Horne, von Stade, Vanzo, Welting, Zaccaria and de Almeida. Sony reissued the album in revised packaging as part of their "The Sony Opera House" series in 2009.
