= Evelyn Lear =

American operatic soprano

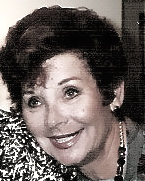
Evelyn Lear, 1994

Evelyn Shulman Lear (January 8, 1926 – July 1, 2012) was an American operatic soprano. Between 1959 and 1992, she appeared in more than forty operatic roles, appeared with every major opera company in the United States and won a Grammy Award in 1966. She was well known for her musical versatility, having sung all three main female roles in Der Rosenkavalier. Lear was also known for her work on 20th century pieces by Robert Ward, Alban Berg, Marvin David Levy, Rudolf Kelterborn and Giselher Klebe. She was married to the American bass-baritone Thomas Stewart until his death in 2006.

== Life and career ==
Lear was born as Evelyn Shulman in Brooklyn, New York, the daughter of Nina (Kwartin), a coloratura, and Nathan Shulman, and granddaughter of the distinguished cantor Zavel Kwartin. Her family was Russian Jewish. She completed her musical education at Hunter College, New York University and the Juilliard School of Music studying voice, piano, French horn and composition. She married Walter Lear, a physician and later political activist, divorcing in the mid-1950s. While at Juilliard she studied under Sergius Kagen and met her future husband, baritone Thomas Stewart. Both Lear and Stewart won Fulbright scholarships to study at Hochschule für Musik in Berlin where she studied with Maria Ivogün. She later studied singing with Beverley Peck Johnson.

Lear started her opera career as a member of the Städtische Oper Berlin in Richard Strauss' Ariadne auf Naxos playing the Composer, a lead role which she would later play at a number of leading opera houses. She played the title role in Alban Berg's Lulu in 1960 in its Austrian debut in concert form. She had only three weeks to learn the role, having been called in as a late replacement. Her performance was so well received that she played the role in the first staged version since World War II at the Theater an der Wien at the Vienna Festival of 1962 with Karl Böhm conducting. The performance was repeated in 1964 and recorded by Deutsche Grammophon. She also performed in Lulu in the late 1980s, albeit in the mezzo-soprano supporting role of the Countess Geschwitz. She appeared as Nina Cavallini in Robert Altman's 1976 film Buffalo Bill and the Indians, or Sitting Bull's History Lesson. In 1989, she played the role of Queen Elizabeth I of England in the musical Elizabeth and Essex, based on Maxwell Anderson's 1930 play.

== Creation of roles ==
Lear created a number of roles during her career. In 1955, having just graduated from Juilliard, she created the role of the heroine Nina in Marc Blitzstein's Reuben, Reuben – a role that would prompt Leonard Bernstein to name his daughter Nina. In 1961, she created the title role of Giselher Klebe's Alkmene in Berlin. Two years later, she created another role as Jeanne in Werner Egk's Die Verlobung in San Domingo in the reopening of the Munich Nationaltheater. Her debut with the Metropolitan Opera came with the creation of the role of Lavinia Mannon in the world premiere of Marvin David Levy's Mourning Becomes Electra in 1967.

Soon after this she experienced vocal problems, losing much of her upper range and clarity, which she blamed on singing so much modern music. This did not stop her performing modern roles, however. In 1974, she created the role of Irma Arkadina in Thomas Pasatieri's The Seagull at the Houston Grand Opera. Lear created the role of Magna in Robert Ward's Minutes to Midnight in 1982, followed by creating the role of Ranyevskaya in Rudolf Kelterborn's Der Kirschgarten in Zurich in 1984.

== Association with Richard Strauss ==
Lear enjoyed success performing Richard Strauss's works. She made her London debut in a performance of the Four Last Songs. Her longest association, however, has been with Der Rosenkavalier having performed all three major female roles. She sang the role of Sophie in regional German opera houses with the Berlin State Opera, progressing to sing the role of Octavian in major opera houses in Vienna, Berlin and New York. Her greatest success in this opera was her role as the Marschallin which she debuted in 1971 and played in leading opera houses including La Scala and her farewell performance at the Metropolitan in 1985.

== Honors and awards ==
The Senate of Berlin gave Lear the title of Kammersängerin for her contribution to the opera in that city while the Salzburg Festival honored her with the Max Reinhardt Award. She won a Grammy Award for Best Opera Recording in the Grammy Awards of 1966 for her work with Karl Böhm, Dietrich Fischer-Dieskau, Fritz Wunderlich and the German Opera and Chorus for their performance of Berg's Wozzeck.

== Family ==
Lear and Thomas Stewart married in 1955 and were together until his death on 24 September 2006, aged 78. She had two children by her previous marriage. Lear died on July 1, 2012, due to a stroke, at Brook Grove nursing center in Sandy Spring, Maryland, aged 86.

== Select discography ==
- Bernstein: On the Town, conducted by Michael Tilson Thomas, Deutsche Grammophon
- Strauss: Der Rosenkavalier, conducted by Edo de Waart, Philips
