= Der Kirschgarten =

German-language opera

Der Kirschgarten (The Cherry Orchard) is an opera in four acts by the Swiss composer Rudolf Kelterborn. The German-language libretto was written by the composer and is based on Gudrun Düwel's German translation of Anton Chekhov's 1904 play The Cherry Orchard. The opera was composed between 1979 and 1981 and premiered on 4 December 1984 at the Zürich Opera House to inaugurate the newly renovated theatre. The premiere production was conducted by Ralf Weikert and directed by Nikolaus Lehnhoff. Evelyn Lear created the pivotal role of Ranevskaya.

== Roles ==
Roles, voice types, premiere cast
Role	Voice type	Premiere cast, 4 December 1984 Conductor: Ralf Weikert
Madame Lyubov Andreievna Ranevskaya, an aristocrat fallen on hard times	soprano	Evelyn Lear
Anya, Ranevskaya's daughter	soprano	Anne Marie Robertson
Varya, Ranevskaya's adopted daughter	mezzo-soprano	Helrun Gardow
Peter Trofimov, a student with revolutionary ideals, beloved by Anya	tenor	Peter Straka
Boris Borisovich Simeonov-Pishchik, a land-owner fallen on hard times	tenor	Horst Hiestermann
Leonid Andreieveitch Gayev, Ranevskaya's brother	baritone	Roland Herrman
Firs. an elderly manservant	tenor	Paul Späni
Charlotta Ivanovna, a governess	mezzo-soprano	Charlotte Berthold
Dunyasha, Gayev's chambermaid	soprano	Dorothea Wirtz
Yepikhodov, Gayev's estate clerk	baritone	Howard Nelson
Yermolai Alexeievitch Lopakhin, a wealthy merchant	bass	Hans Helm
The Stationmaster	bass	Gejza Zelenay
