= Der Rosenkavalier (Edo de Waart recording) =

- Philips LP: 6707 030

Studio album
- Released: 1977
- Studio: De Doelen, Rotterdam, Holland
- Genre: Opera
- Length: 206:03
- Language: German & Italian
- Label: Philips

Der Rosenkavalier
- Philips CD: 442 086-2

Der Rosenkavalier (The Knight of the Rose) is a 206-minute studio album of Richard Strauss's opera, performed by a cast led by Jules Bastin, José Carreras, Derek Hammond-Stroud, Evelyn Lear, Frederica von Stade, and Ruth Welting with the Rotterdam Philharmonic Orchestra under the direction of Edo de Waart. It was released in 1977.

== Background ==
The album presents the score without any cuts. It was recorded shortly after its musicians had performed the opera theatrically at the Holland Festival in 1976. The Holland production was staged by the Netherlands Opera Foundation and produced by John Cox, with décor and costumes designed by Elizabeth Dalton.

== Recording ==
The album was recorded using analogue technology in July 1976 at De Doelen, Rotterdam, the Netherlands.

== Packaging ==
The covers of the LP and cassette releases of the album feature a photograph of Lear, von Stade and Welting in their Holland Festival costumes. The cover of Philips's CD release of the album, designed under the art direction of Ton Friesen, features a photograph by Hans Morren of a rose silver-plated by Juwelier Fischer of Vienna.

== Critical reception ==
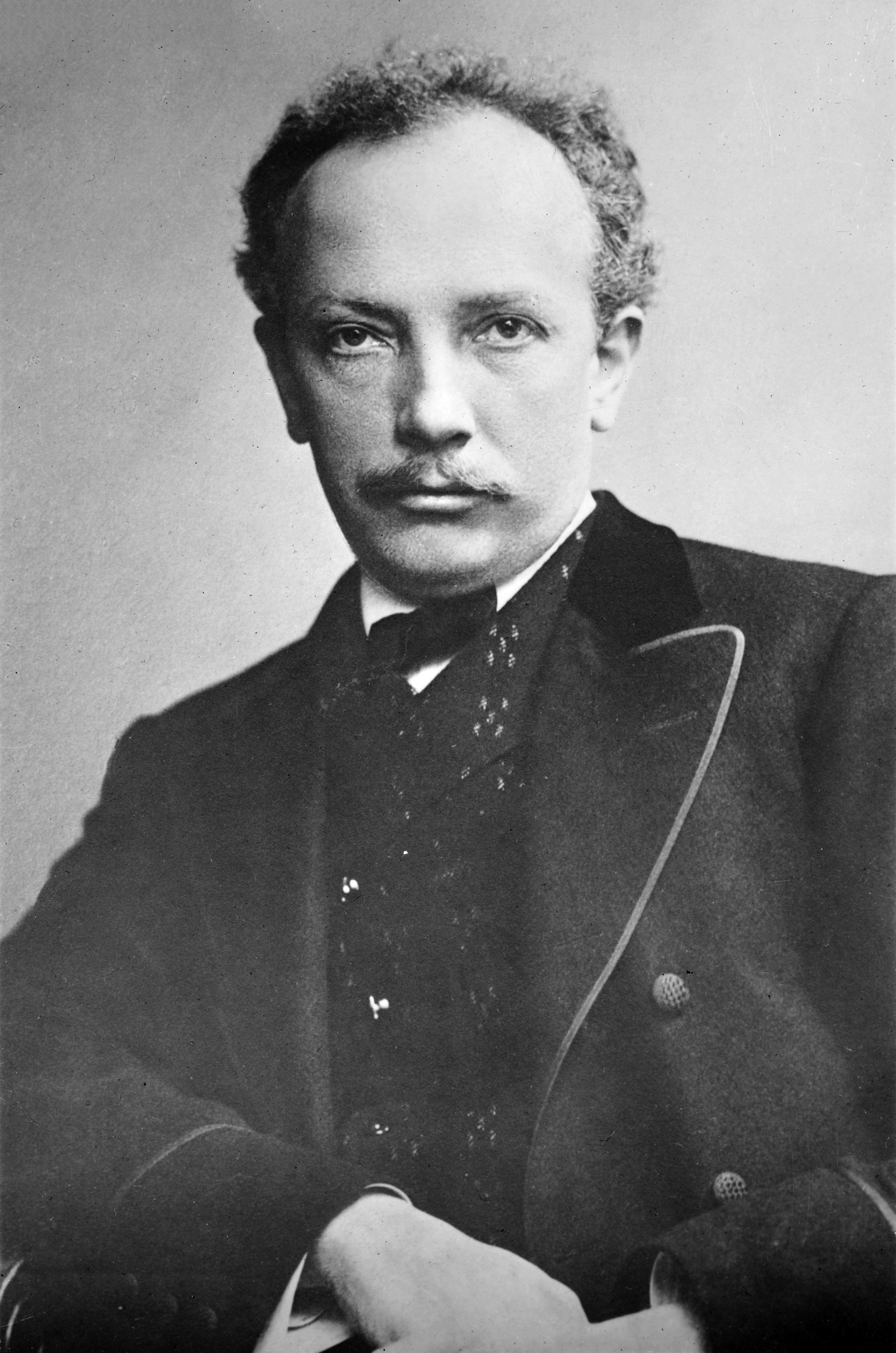
Richard Strauss photographed in 1910, one year before Der Rosenkavalier was first performed

William Mann reviewed the album on LP in Gramophone in August 1977, comparing it with rival versions conducted by Herbert von Karajan and Georg Solti. Collectors might be lured to the new recording, he thought, by Frederica von Stade's Octavian, "a lovely reading by a favourite young mezzo". Musically, she sang with a tone that was ample, even and focused, and was as meticulous in her ensemble work as a violist in a great string quartet. Dramatically, she was equally effective in every chapter of Octavian's story – her outburst of anger with the Marschallin was "explosive", her banter with Sophie "perfectly delightful", her feigned inebriation as Mariandel "lovely to hear as well as comic". As Octavian's mistress, Evelyn Lear had "a timbre like old gold, a tenderness and teasing humour, many individual inflexions that recall no other Marschallin". Her singing fell short of technical perfection, but her acting was "attractive and skilful" and all her most important passages were executed "beautifully". Ruth Welting was guilty of a few vocal lapses too, perpetrating the occasional "flutter" above the stave, but her Sophie managed to be self-assertive while remaining "sweetly girlish". Jules Bastin endowed Ochs with a voice that was generous and equal to all Strauss's onerous demands. He deserved praise for his "attack and savory resonance, his smooth cantabile and his ripe enunciation of the text", though Solti's Manfred Jungwirth was both more accurate and funnier in his handling of Ochs's peasant idiolect. Derek Hammond-Stroud was a good Faninal overall, even if he sounded too young to be Welting's father and botched one note at his first appearance. José Carreras's Italian Singer was "too noisy". The many minor roles were all performed competently by a legion of Netherlanders. De Waart's Dutch orchestra, likewise, was unequivocally good. Its woodwinds were "crisp and savory", its brass "unusually firm and together and plump", its strings "active" and "stylish". De Waart sometimes set a pace that was too slow – in Ochs's climactic routing or in the duet "Mit Ihren Augen voll von Tränen", for instance – but his preludes were incandescent and his tempi in general "suitable and spirited". "The swagger of Ochs's entry in the second act [and] the elegance of the strings in the Letter Scene" were particularly worthy of note. Philips's production team had chosen to balance singers and instrumentalists without favouring either over the other, and had resisted the temptation to deploy "sound-effects or 'rhubarb' noises". In sum, whether the new album was preferable to its competitors was a matter of personal taste. Karajan's slightly abridged version was "enchanting" and "sparkling"; Solti's, complete, offered "unceasing brilliance" and Régine Crespin's Marschallin; de Waart's, also complete, was "less vivacious" than its predecessors but had von Stade's Octavian and the "confidence and style and operatic personality" that came from its theatrical origins.

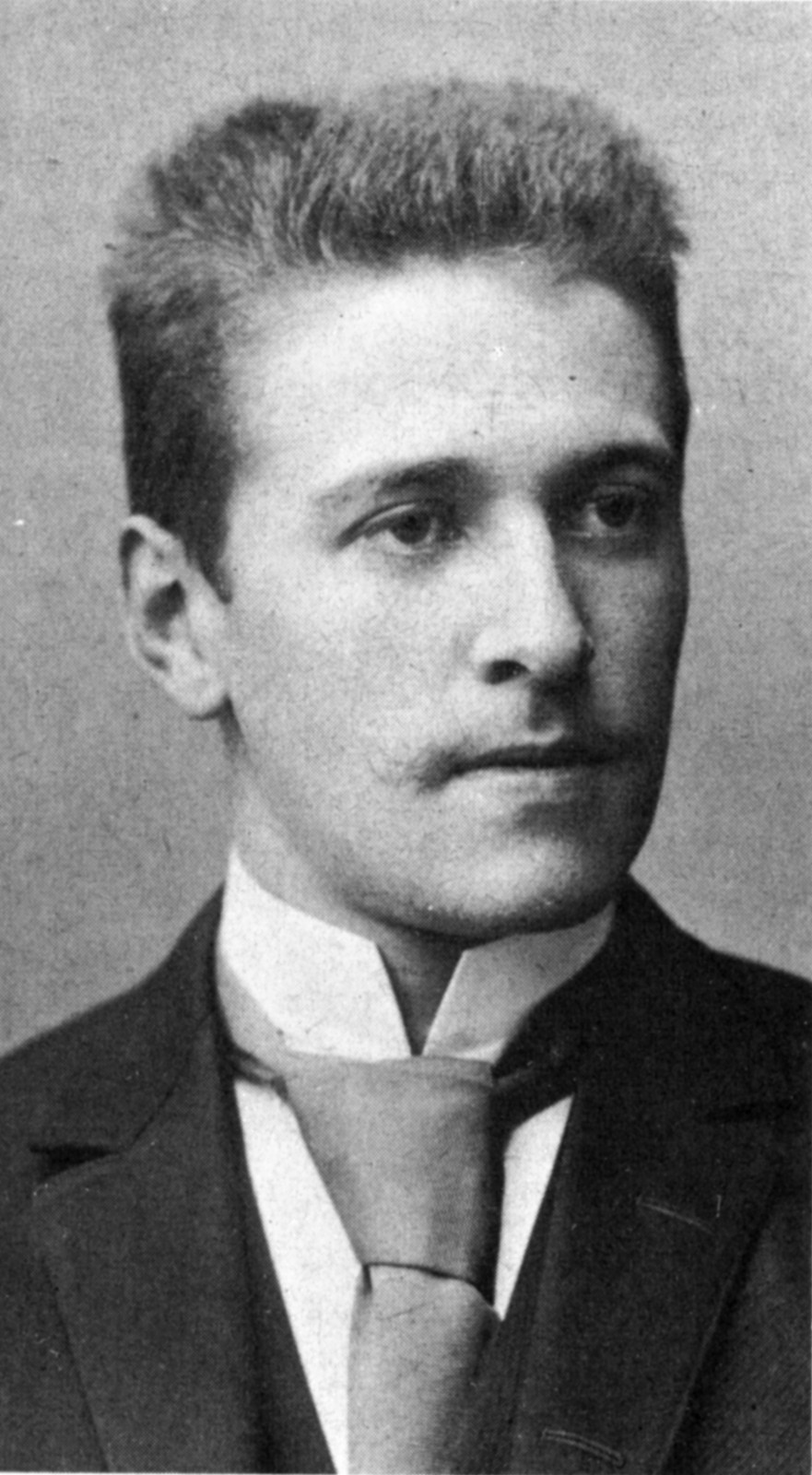
Librettist Hugo von Hofmmannsthal in 1893

George Jellinek reviewed the album on LP in Stereo Review in October 1977. Pre-eminent among its singers was Frederica von Stade, he wrote, "an Octavian credible in all the guises of her mercurial role, who sings bewitchingly and whose warm, creamy tone soars above the staff with radiant ease". Evelyn Lear's resigned-sounding Marschallin was not as compellingly acted as would have been ideal, but was sung "exquisitely" with "many lovely phrases". Ruth Welting's Sophie was technically impeccable and vividly characterized though somewhat cool and thin of tone. As Ochs, Jules Bastin made up for his "limitations in range and resonance" by singing with a legato stylishness and by entirely submerging his Belgian identity into that of the Viennese baron. José Carreras was "refulgent" as the Italian tenor, if manifestly challenged by Strauss's climactic high C-flat. Derek Hammond-Stroud and the secondary cast were all at least satisfactory. Conducting, Edo de Waart brought "great affection to this music, along with a light touch, a great deal of tenderness, and, on the whole, just tempos". He elicited orchestral playing that was beautiful, consistently aristocratic and had the transparency of chamber music. The price of his restraint was that his recording seemed "somewhat lacking in passion". Philips's excellent engineering was wholly honest and innocent of any irritating trickery. The album as a whole was a fluent, conscientious, theatrically informed reading that deserved to be applauded, but it did not quite come up to the extraordinary standard set by Georg Solti's version on Decca

J. B. Steane reviewed the album on LP in Gramophone in April 1978. Frederica von Stade's Octavian was "vivid, stylish but feminine", he wrote, and Evelyn Lear's Marschallin "very touching in the quieter passages". But Ruth Welting's Sophie was "inadequate" and Jules Bastin's Baron Ochs "shallow toned". Although Edo de Waart "caught the youthfulness of the score with infectious zest", the weaknesses in his cast meant that his recording was no better than "a mixed pleasure"

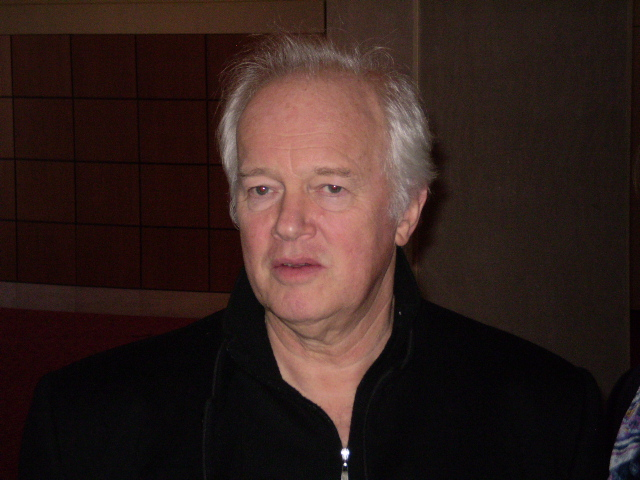
Conductor Edo de Waart in 2008

Alan Blyth reviewed the album on CD in Gramophone in December 1994. Its greatest asset, he thought, was Frederica von Stade's "beautifully sung, engaging, fully characterized Octavian", "perhaps her best performance on disc". She was as successful in portraying Octavian's comic dimension as his romantic and erotic ardour. The set's other three principals were less attractive. Evelyn Lear's reading of the Marschallin, although evidently the product of much reflection, was spoiled by a lack of emotional profundity and a voice that was unappealingly "worn and unfocused". Ruth Welting's Sophie was "keenly sung but slightly brittle and monochrome". Jules Bastin's enjoyably animated Baron Ochs was compromised by unconvincing Viennese diction and a timbre that was not deep enough for the role's requirements. The best performances in the minor roles came from José Carreras, in the high summer of his career, delivering an Italian Tenor of "outgoing élan", and Derek Hammond-Stroud as a convincing fusspot of a Faninal. The other minor parts were sung unexceptionably but without great distinction either. Edo de Waart's "lithe" conducting resisted the temptation to wallow at climaxes and elicited orchestral playing of Mozartian elegance. The album's audio quality was "clear and warm" but placed the soloists further back on the soundstage than was usual.

Blyth mentioned the album in a survey of the opera's discography in Gramophone in May 2000. "The 1976 Philips set, unavailable at present, is no great loss. Except for the ... graceful conducting of Edo de Waart and Frederica von Stade's ... Octavian, it is an undistinguished affair with a poor Marschallin and Ochs."

Patrick O'Connor reviewed a Decca reissue of the album on CD in Gramophone in August 2003. "In the title role", he wrote, "Frederica von Stade is at the peak of her considerable form. This, surely, must be exactly the sort of voice Strauss had in mind for the part". Evelyn Lear's Marschallin had "grace and gentle good humour", although not the sumptuous timbre needed to make the most of the role's moments of greatest sublimity. Ruth Welting was a "vivid" Sophie. Jules Bastin avoided the danger exaggerating Baron Ochs's absurdity and was admirably precise in his enunciation. Edo de Waart delivered a performance that was notable for its comedic awareness and its feeling of unity.

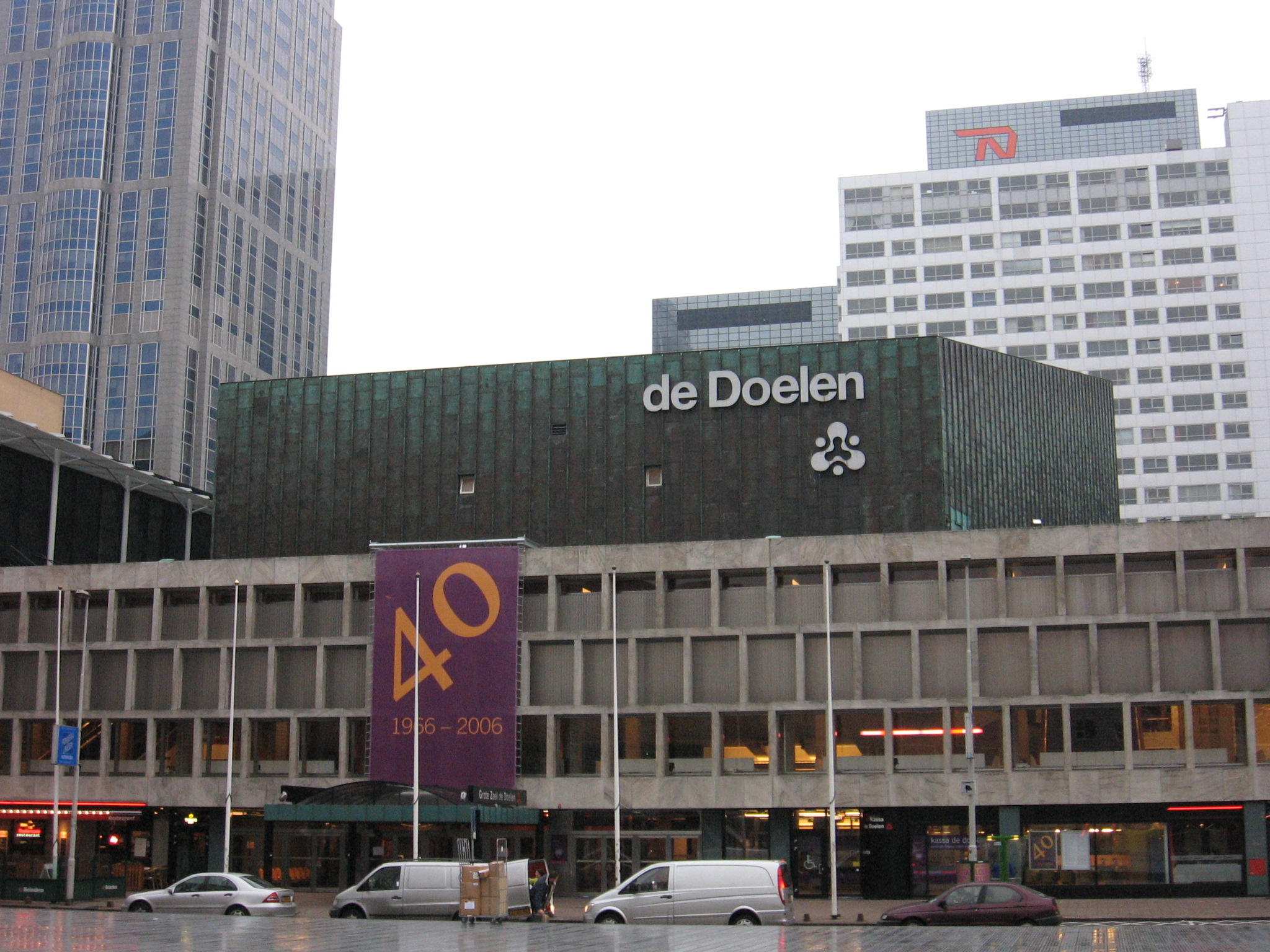
De Doelen, Philips's recording venue

David Patrick Stearns included the album in a survey of the discography of the opera in Gramophone in May 2011. "Frederica von Stade's light, honeyed mezzo," he wrote, [conveys] Octavian's impetuosity like no other. No recording so effectively captures the sense of two frightened teenagers – von Stade and Ruth Welting – beyond their ken." Jules Bastin's baritonal timbre was positively an asset to his Baron Ochs. The orchestra played with as much champagne gaiety as if they had been performing Die Fledermaus. If Philips had been able to tape Evelyn Lear's Marschallin on some of the singer's better days, their album would have been the best studio recording of the opera ever made.

Stearns revisited the album in Gramophone in October 2011 when it was reissued on CD by the Rotterdam Philharmonic Orchestra's own label. "Vocally", he wrote, "Frederica von Stade is at her peak in a particularly tormented, emotionally mature portrayal of Octavian". It was true that the "vocal freshness" of Evelyn Lear's Marschallin had its ups and downs, but she gave a lively performance that was better than most critics had acknowledged. Ruth Welting's Sophie was "just fine, vocally and theatrically, if not that distinctive". It was an advantage to Jules Bastin that his timbre was as baritonal as it was: where deeper basses muddied Baron Ochs's music in a "pitch-obscuring rumble", his lighter tone enabled listeners to enjoy a "flood of character details from his considerable theatrical imagination". José Carreras abused his glorious voice by shouting his aria instead of singing it.

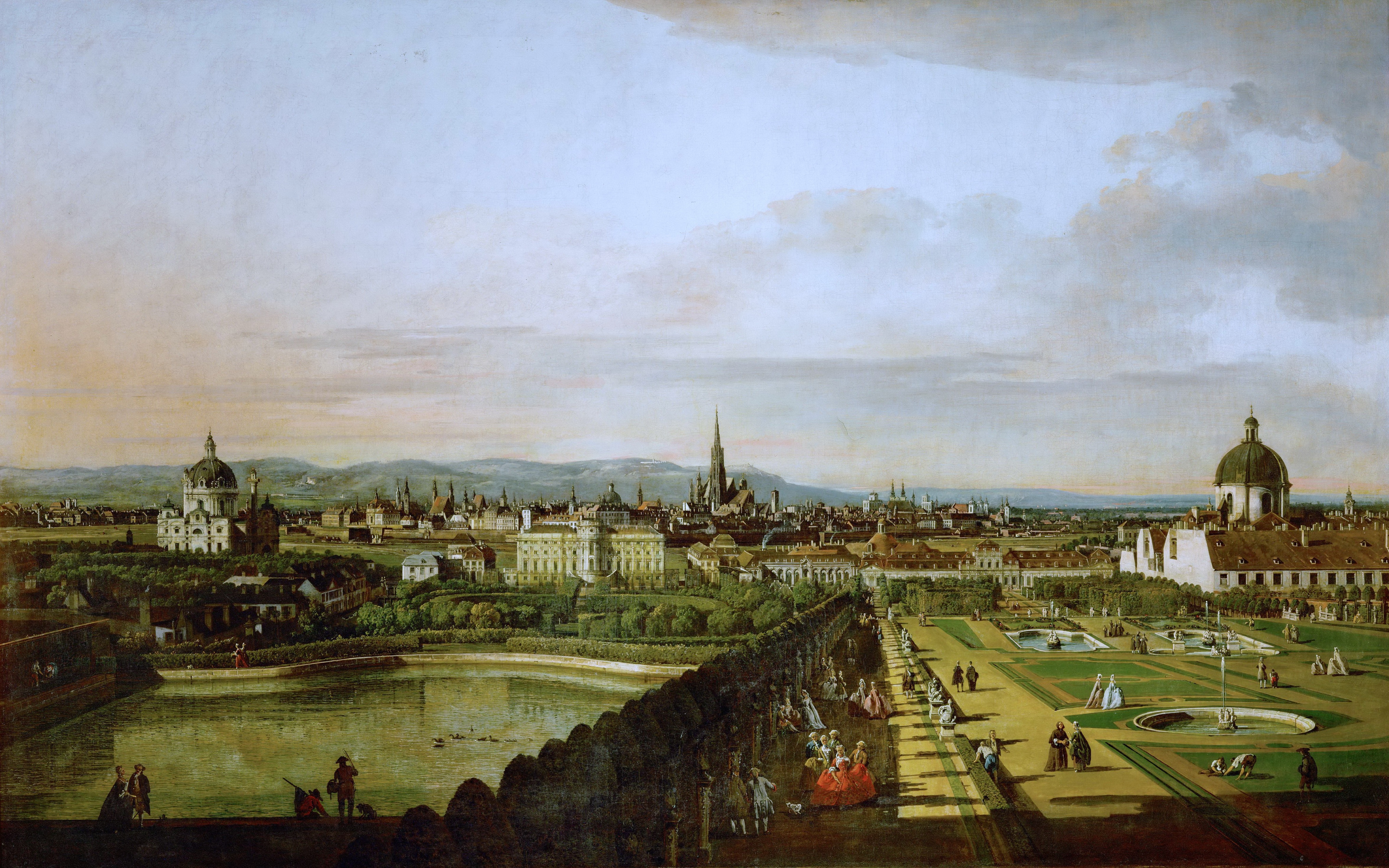
Bernardo Bellotto's 1758 painting of Vienna as seen from the Belvedere is an image of the place and era in which the comedy of Der Rosenkavalier unfolds

== Track listing: CD1 ==
Richard Strauss (!864–1949)

Der Rosenkavalier (Dresden, 1911), Kömodie für Musik in drei Aufzügen (Comedy for Music in three Acts); libretto by Hugo von Hofmannsthal (1874–1929)

Act One

- 1 (3:35) Prelude
- 2 (7:56) Wie du warst, (Octavian, Marschallin)
- 3 (4:10) Marie Thérès'! (Octavian, Marschallin)
- 4 (3:36) Quinquin, es ist mein Mann (Marschallin, Octavian, Ochs, Marschallin's Major-domo)
- 5 (8:34) Selbstverständlich empfängt mich Ihro Gnaden (Ochs, Footmen, Marschallin, Marschallin's Major-domo)
- 6 (6:09) Hat Sie schon einmal mit einem Kavalier (Ochs, Octavian, Marschallin)
- 7 (3:57) Nein, Er agiert mir gar zu gut (Marschallin, Ochs, Octavian)
- 8 (2:04) I komm' glei (Octavian, Orphans, Milliner, Animal Seller, Marschallin, Valzacchi)
- 9 (2:55) Di rigori armato il senno (Singer)
- 10 (3:12) Als Morgengabe (Ochs, Notary, Singer)
- 11 (3:55) Mein lieber Hippolyte (Marschallin, Valzacchi, Ochs, Annina)
- 12 (5:10) Da geht er hin (Marschallin)
- 13 (6:17) Ach! Du bist wieder da! (Marschallin, Octavian)
- 14 (2:27) Die Zeit, die ist ein sonderbar Ding (Marschallin)
- 15 (4:34) Mein schöner Schatz (Octavian, Marschallin)
- 16 (3:27) Ich werd' jetzt in die Kirche gehn (Marschallin, Octavian)
- 17 (3:48) Ich hab' ihn nicht einmal geküsst (Marschallin, Footmen)

== Track listing: CD2 ==
Act Two

- 1 (1:49) Prelude
- 2 (3:41) In dieser feierlichen Stunden (Sophie, Marianne, Couriers)
- 3 (7:40) Mir ist die Ehre widerfahren (Octavian, Sophie)
- 4 (4:02) Ich kenn' ihn schon recht wohl (Sophie, Octavian)
- 5 (4:01) Jetzt aber kommt mein Herr Zukünftiger (Sophie, Faninal, Octavian, Ochs, Marianne)
- 6 (3:21) Eh bien! Nun plauder Sie uns eins (Ochs, Sophie, Faninal, Octavian, Marianne)
- 7 (3:29) Wird kommen über Nacht (Ochs, Octavian, Marianne, Faninal)
- 8 (6:35) Wird Sie das Mannsbild da heiraten (Octavian, Sophie, Faninal's Major-domo, Marianne)
- 9 (5:43) Herr Baron von Lerchenau! (Valzacchi, Annina, Ochs, Sophie, Octavian)
- 10 (3:10) Mord! Mord! Mein Blut! (Ochs, Ochs's Servants, Annina, Sophie, Faninal's Servants, Octavian, Marianne, Faninal)
- 11 (4:23) Er muss mich pardonieren (Octavian, Faninal, Sophie, Ochs)
- 12 (2:21) Is gut! Is gut! Ein Schluck (Ochs, Faninal)
- 13 (5:21) Da lieg' ich (Ochs, Ochs's Servants)
- 14 (6:22) Ohne mich, ohne mich, jeder Tag dir so bang (Ochs, Annina)

== Track listing: CD3 ==
Act Three

- 1 (6:52) Prelude and Pantomime
- 2 (2:35) Hab'n Euer Gnaden noch weitre Befehle? (Landlord, Waiters, Ochs)
- 3 (5:03) Nein, nein, nein, nein! I trink' kein Wein (Octavian, Ochs)
- 4 (2:10) Die schöne Musi! (Octavian, Ochs)
- 5 (6:54) Es ist ja eh all's eins (Octavian, Ochs, Annina, Landlord, Waiters, Children, Valzacchi)
- 6 (3:52) Halt! Keiner rührt sich! (Commissioner, Valzacchi, Octavian, Ochs, Landlord)
- 7 (5:19) Zur Stelle! Was wird von mir gewünscht? (Faninal, Ochs, Commissioner, Landlord, Children, Onlookers, Men)
- 8 (2:17) Sind desto eher in klaren (Ochs, Commissioner, Octavian)
- 9 (3:01) Muss jetzt partout zu ihr! (Ochs, Landlord, Octavian, Commissioner, Marschallin, Sophie)
- 10 (7:39) Lass er nur gut sein und verschwind Er (Marschallin, Ochs, Commissioner, Sophie, Octavian)
- 11 (2:13) Leupold, wir gehn! (Ochs, Annina, Children, Waiters, Landlord, Valzacchi, Musicians, Coachmen, Porter)
- 12 (7:16) Mein Gott, es war nicht mehr als eine Farce (Sophie, Octavian, Marschallin)
- 13 (6:09) Marie Thérès'!... Hab mir's gelobt Ihn lieb zu haben (Octavian, Marschallin, Sophie)
- 14 (3:51) Ist ein Traum, kann nicht wirklich sein (Sophie, Octavian, Faninal, Marschallin)
- 15 (3:01) Ist ein Traum... Spür nur dich (Sophie, Octavian)

== Personnel ==
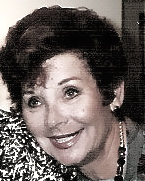
Soprano Evelyn Lear in 1994

- Evelyn Lear (1926–2012, soprano), Princess Marie Thérèse von Werdenberg, the Marschallin (wife of the Field Marshal)
- Frederica von Stade (mezzo-soprano), Octavian Maria Ehrenreich Bonaventura Fernand Hyacinth, Count Rofrano, called Quinquin, a young gentleman of noble family
- Jules Bastin (bass), Baron Ochs of Lerchenau
- Derek Hammond-Stroud (baritone), Herr von Faninal, a rich merchant, recently ennobled
- Ruth Welting (soprano), Sophie von Faninal, his daughter
- José Carreras (tenor), a Singer
- Nelly Morpurgo (mezzo-soprano), Jungfer Marianne Leitmetzerin, a Duenna
- James Atherton (tenor), Valzacchi, an intriguer
- Sophia van Sante (contralto), Annina, his companion
- Henk Smit (bass), the Police Commissioner and a Notary
- Wouter Goedhardt (tenor), Marschallin's Major-domo
- Matthijs Coppens (tenor), Faninal's Major-domo and an Animal Seller
- Adriaan van Limpt (tenor), a Landlord
- Angela Bello (soprano), a Noble Orphan
- Marianne Dieleman (soprano), a Noble Orphan
- Thea van der Putten (contralto), a Noble Orphan
- Renée van Haarlem (soprano), a Milliner
- Frans Fiselier (tenor), a Footman of the Marschallin and a Waiter
- Paul Bindels (tenor), a Footman of the Marschallin and a Waiter
- Ad Kooijmans (baritone), a Footman of the Marschallin and a Waiter
- Wilhelm Huisman (bass), a Footman of the Marschallin and a Waiter
- Rudolf Vedder (baritone), a Porter
- Members of the Helmond Concert Choir
- Chorus of the Netherlands Opera (chorus master: Thijs Kramer)
- Rotterdam Philharmonic Orchestra
- Edo de Waart, conductor

== Release history ==
In 1977, Philips released the album as a set of four LPs (catalogue number 6707 030) and a set of cassettes (catalogue number 7699 045) Both issues were accompanied by a booklet providing notes and a libretto in German and English.

In 1984, Philips issued the album on CD (catalogue number 442 086-2) with a 196-page booklet including photographs of Strauss, von Hofmannsthal, Bastin, Carreras, Lear, von Stade, Hammond-Stroud, Welting and de Waart, reproductions of a page of Strauss's autograph score and a playbill from the opera's première, six photographs of the related Holland Festival production taken by Jaap Pieper, a libretto in German and English, notes by Jean-Jacques Velly in French, notes by Anna Amalie Abert in English, German and Italian and a synopsis by Bernd Delfs in English, French, German and Italian.

The album was reissued on CD by Decca in 2003 (catalogue number 473 361-2DOC3), by the Rotterdam Philharmonic Orchestra's own label in 2011 (catalogue number RPVR 2011-1) and by Brilliant Classics in 2012.
