= Ruth Welting =

American operatic soprano (1948–1999)

Ruth Welting (November 5, 1948 – December 16, 1999) was an American operatic soprano who had an active international career from the early 1970s through the mid-1990s. A specialist in the coloratura soprano repertoire, she was particularly associated with the Metropolitan Opera where she performed regularly from 1976 until her retirement from performance in 1994. Endowed with a powerful coloratura voice, she is remembered as one of a few sopranos capable of singing the Mad Scene ("Il dolce suono") from Lucia di Lammermoor in the original F major key.

== Life and career ==
Born in Memphis, Tennessee, Welting was the youngest of four sisters. Her older sister, Patricia Welting (1938–1986), was also a soprano who performed roles at the Metropolitan Opera during the late 1960s. Ruth began studying the piano at the age of 3. While a student at Messick High School she won the Ignacy Jan Paderewski Gold Medal from the National Guild of Piano Teachers. After graduating from Messick in 1966, she spent three years studying piano on full scholarship at the University of Memphis where she also sang leading roles in student opera productions. She also spent a summer during these years studying voice with Pablo Casals.

After her junior year at Memphis State, Welting left the school to become a student at the American Opera Center at the Juilliard School. After only a few months in the program, she toured with the Juilliard Opera to Italy where she performed at the Spoleto Festival USA. What was initially intended to be a short trip, turned into a long-term venture. She remained in Italy, dropped out of Juilliard, and spent the next three years studying voice with Luigi Ricci in Rome. She later studied voice privately with Daniel Ferro in New York City and Janine Reiss in Paris. In 1968 she won the Metropolitan Opera National Council Auditions and debuted there in 1976 as Zerbinetta in Richard Strauss's Ariadne auf Naxos. Her official operatic debut came as Blonde in Mozart's Die Entführung aus dem Serail.

She temporarily retired in 1986–87 due to the murder of her sister Patricia Welting but resumed work in 1988. She officially retired in 1994 due to a change of interest and started to pursue government and foreign affairs. She continued her studies at Syracuse University (School of Government) until she was diagnosed with cancer in early 1999. She died aged 51 in Asheville, North Carolina.

She was the third wife of conductor Edo de Waart.

== Repertoire ==
- Delibes: Lakmé
- Donizetti: La fille du régiment, Lucia di Lammermoor, Don Pasquale
- Humperdinck: Hänsel und Gretel
- Massenet: Cendrillon
- Moore: The Ballad of Baby Doe
- Mozart: Der Schauspieldirektor, Die Entführung aus dem Serail, Die Zauberflöte, Le nozze di Figaro
- Offenbach: Les contes d'Hoffmann
- Rossini: The Barber of Seville, Il turco in Italia
- Sauguet: Les caprices de Marianne
- R. Strauss: Ariadne auf Naxos, Der Rosenkavalier, Arabella
- Thomas: Mignon
- Verdi: Rigoletto

== See also ==
- Humperdinck: Hänsel und Gretel (John Pritchard recording)
- Massenet: Cendrillon (Julius Rudel recording)
- Strauss: Der Rosenkavalier (Edo de Waart recording)
- Thomas: Mignon (Antonio de Almeida recording)
