= Rudolf Kelterborn =

Swiss composer and pedagogue (1931–2021)

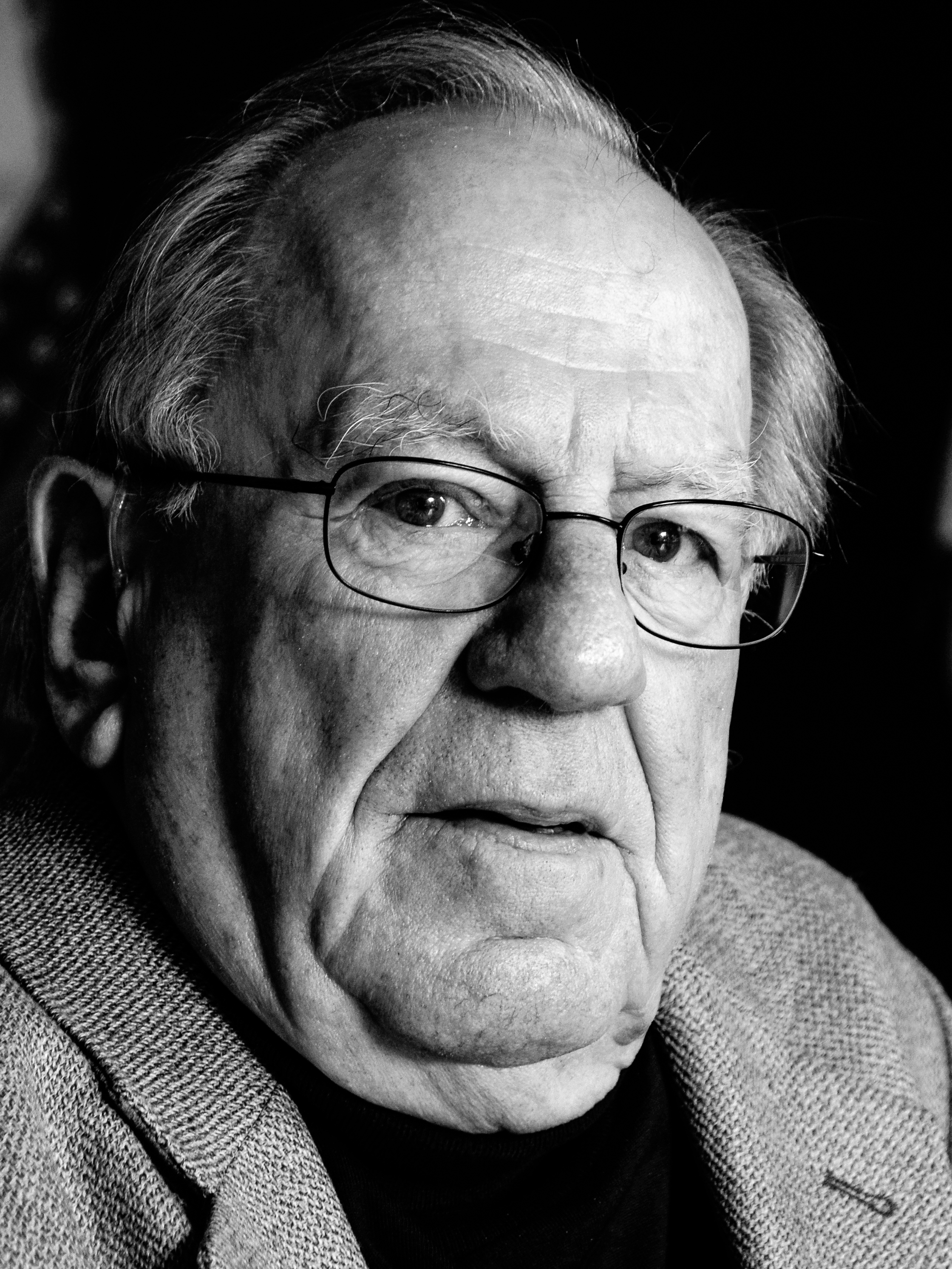
Rudolf Kelterborn, 2009

Rudolf Kelterborn (3 September 1931 – 24 March 2021) was a Swiss musician and composer.

== Life ==
Born in Basel, Kelterborn studied in Basel, Detmold, Salzburg, and Zürich, among other places, with the composers Walther Geiser, Willy Burkhard, Boris Blacher, Günter Bialas, and Wolfgang Fortner. In his own teaching career, Kelterborn has served as a lecturer and professor at a number of music colleges in Germany and in Switzerland, where he directed the Basel Music Academy from 1983 to 1994. Kelterborn also headed the music division of Swiss German radio from 1974 to 1980.

Farther afield, Kelterborn held guest lecturerships in the United States, England, Japan, China, and Eastern Europe. His works have been performed throughout Europe, the United States, and Japan, and he was also active as a conductor on the international scene.

He died in Basel aged 89.

== Works ==
Kelterborn's oeuvre covers many different musical genres and includes five operas, orchestral works (some with solo instruments, voices, or electronics), chamber music, and vocal works. His four-act opera Der Kirschgarten inaugurated the newly rebuilt Zürich Opera House in 1984.
