= Nicola Zaccaria =

Greek operatic bass (1923–2007)

Nicola Zaccaria in Rigoletto, Teatro alla Scala, Milan, lyric season 1933-1934 (photo with 1953 dedication)

Nicola Zaccaria (9 March 1923 – 24 July 2007), born Nicholas Angelos Zachariou was a Greek bass.

== Career ==
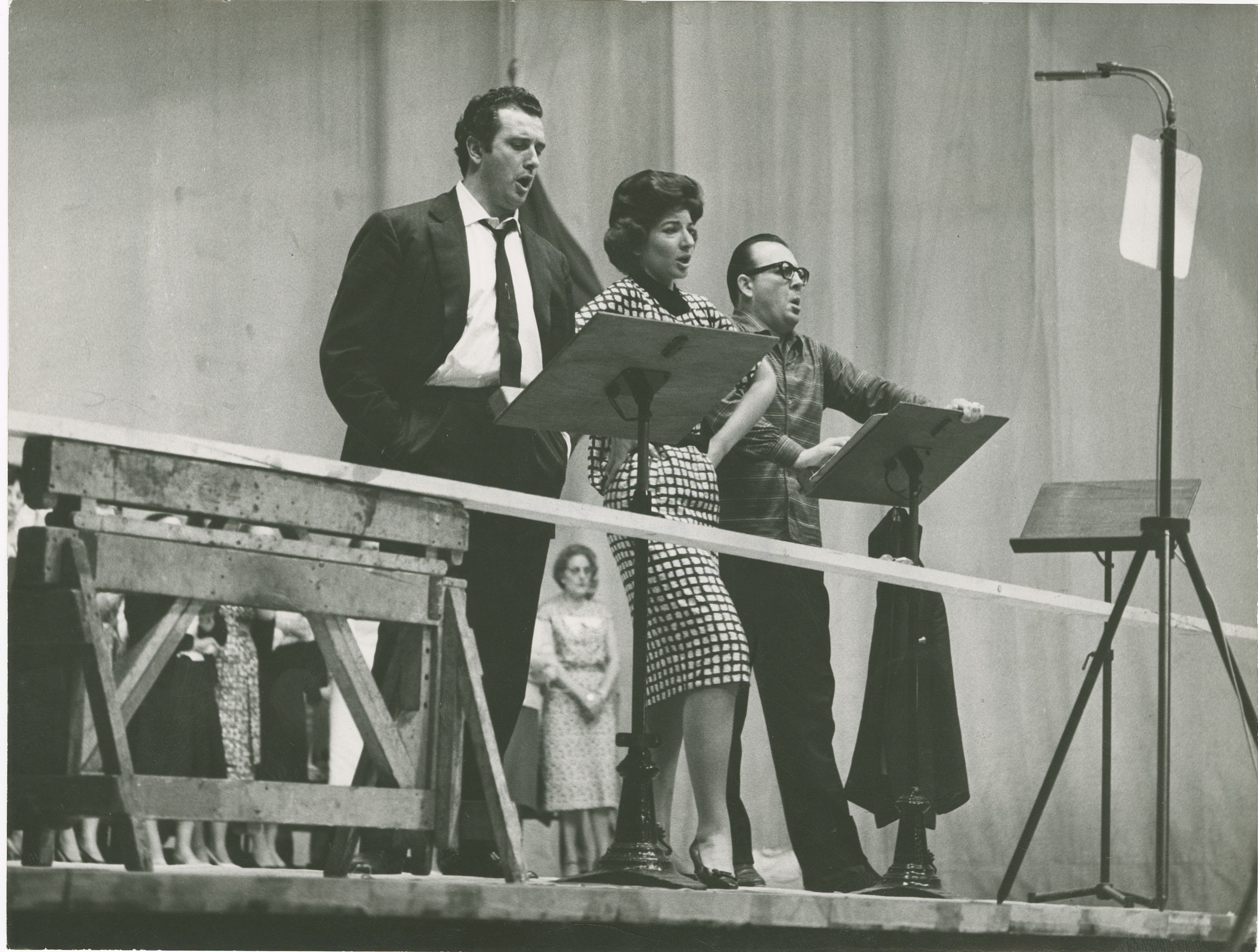
Nicola Zaccaria (right) with Franco Corelli and Maria Callas during the recording of Vincenzo Bellini's opera Norma, Teatro alla Scala, Milan. 1960.

Born in Piraeus, Zaccaria studied at the Athens Conservatory where he enjoyed his debut in 1949, aged 26. He sang at La Scala in 1953 and his position as a mainstay of the bass operatic repertoire was assured thereafter. He was La Scala's principal bass for almost 15 years. He sang with some of the most famous singers of his generation, such as Maria Callas, Leontyne Price, Franco Corelli, and Marilyn Horne, who was Zaccaria's companion in later life. Despite intimidating competition, he developed an impressive international career and recorded more than 30 operas for major recording companies. With Callas he recorded nine complete operas:

- Aida (1955, as Il re d’Egitto)
- Rigoletto (1955, as Sparafucile)
- Il trovatore (1956, as Ferrando)
- La Boheme (1956, as Colline)
- Un ballo in maschera (1956, as Tom)
- Il barbiere di Siviglia (1957, as Don Basilio)
- La sonnambula (1957, as Il conte Rodolfo)
- Turandot (1957, as Timur)
- Norma (1960, as Oroveso)

According to John Ardoin in his book The Callas Legacy, Zaccaria also recorded under the pseudonym Giulio Mauri in the complete recordings of Il trovatore and Turandot in which he appeared with the soprano.

Nicola Zaccaria died in Athens on July 24, 2007 from Alzheimer's disease at age 84.
