= Ralf Weikert =

Austrian conductor and music educator

Ralf Weikert (born 10 November 1940) is an Austrian conductor, especially of operas by Mozart and Rossini. He is an academic teacher of conducting in Luzern.

Born in Sankt Florian, Weikert studied at the Bruckner conservatory in Linz and the Hochschule für Musik und darstellende Kunst Wien, conducting with Hans Swarowsky.

Weikert was from 1971 a regular conductor at the Salzburg Festival. He held leading positions at the Theater Bonn and the Oper Frankfurt. From 1981 to 1984, he was Chefdirigent of the Mozarteum Orchestra Salzburg. From 1983 to 1992, he was Musikdirektor at the Opernhaus Zürich.

He has been a professor of conducting at the Musikhochschule Luzern from 2008.

== Selected recordings ==
- Rossini: Tancredi (1985)
- Rossini:Il barbiere di Siviglia (1991)
- The romantic tenor – Francisco Araiza. (1992)
- Rossini: L'italiana in Algeri (1993)
- Mozart: Arien (1993)
- Konzertarien 1972–1983 von Wolfgang Amadeus Mozart. 1 CD. 1995.
- Deon van der Walt – Portrait (1999)
- Eugen d’Albert: Die toten Augen (2000)
- Rossini: Ouvertüren (2001)

== Literature ==
- Andreas Kotte, ed. (2005). "Ralf Weikert". Theaterlexikon der Schweiz / Dictionnaire du théâtre en Suisse / Dizionario Teatrale Svizzero / Lexicon da teater svizzer [Theater Dictionary of Switzerland]. Vol. 3. Zürich: Chronos. pp. 2063–2064. ISBN 978-3-0340-0715-3. LCCN 2007423414. OCLC 62309181.
