= Così fan tutte (Alain Lombard recording) =

- Erato LP: STU 71110

Studio album by Alain Lombard
- Released: 1978
- Studio: Palais de la musique et des congrès, Strasbourg
- Genre: Opera
- Length: 178:51
- Language: Italian
- Label: Erato
- Producer: Michel Garcin

Così fan tutte
- Erato CD: 2292-45683-2

Così fan tutte is a 178-minute studio album of Wolfgang Amadeus Mozart's opera, performed by Jules Bastin, Philippe Huttenlocher, Kiri Te Kanawa, David Rendall, Frederica von Stade and Teresa Stratas with the Choeurs de l'Opéra du Rhin and the Strasbourg Philharmonic Orchestra under the direction of Alain Lombard. It was released in 1978.

== Background ==
The album omits some of Mozart's recitative, and also cuts two numbers in their entirety: No. 7, the duettino "Al fato dan legge" for Ferrando and Guglielmo, and No. 24, the aria "Ah lo veggio" for Ferrando.

== Recording ==
The album was recorded using analogue technology in May 1977 in the Palais de la Musique et des Congrès, Strasbourg.

== Cover art ==
The cover of the first CD version of the album, designed by Mister Brown, features a detail of J. Pillement's painting "Les jardins de Benfica" (1785), a work in the collection of the Musée des Arts Décoratifs, Paris.

== Critical reception ==
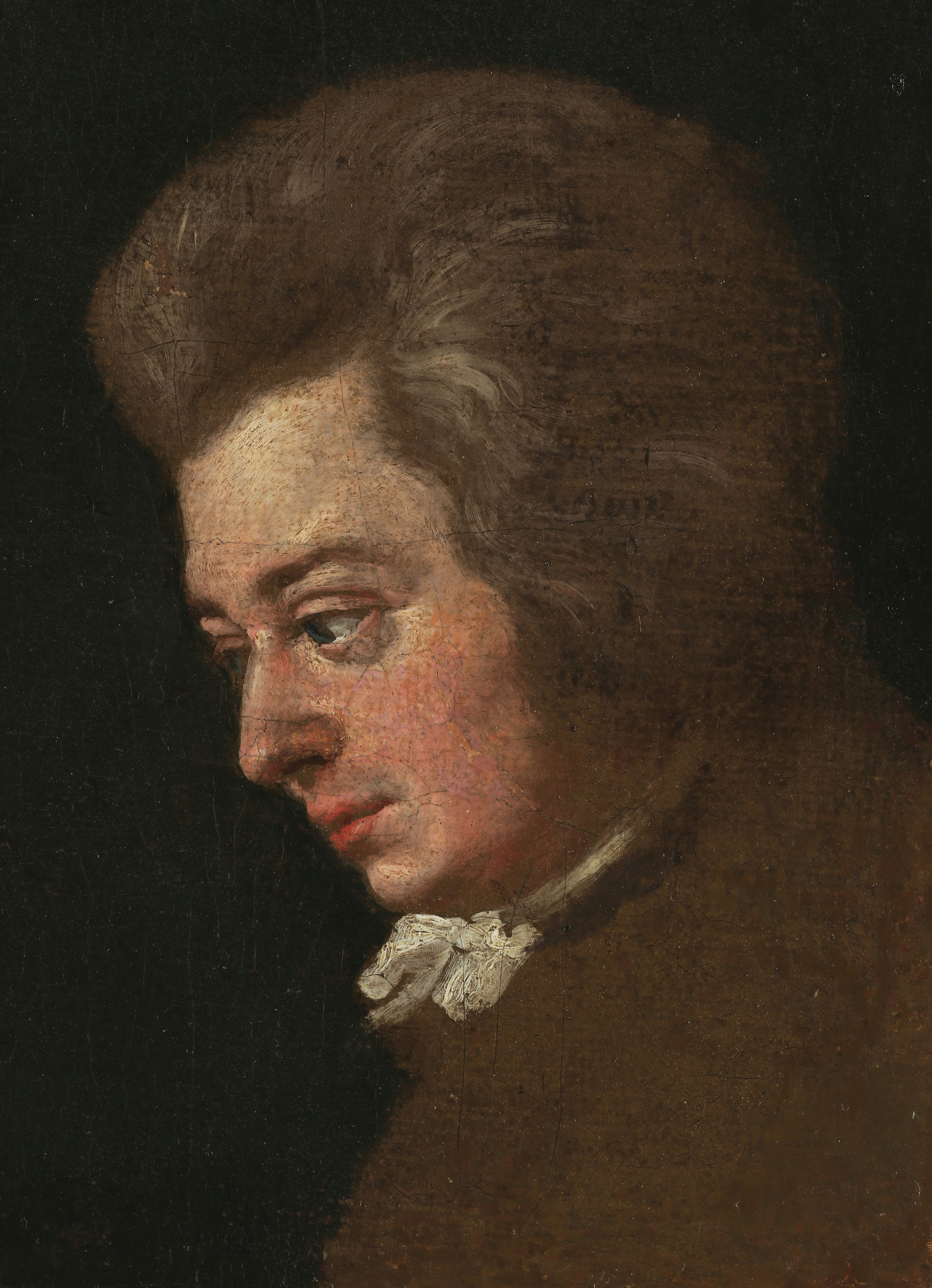
Mozart painted by Joseph Lange c. 1782-1783

The musicologist Stanley Sadie reviewed the album on LP in Gramophone in May 1978. Comparing it with rival recordings conducted by Herbert von Karajan and Karl Böhm, he acknowledged that these classic readings offered singing of a "subtlety and poise" that Alain Lombard's version could not equal. On the other hand, the new album's students at Don Alfonso's school for lovers came to their classroom with "youthful timbre[s] and natural high spirits" that were nicely appropriate to their roles. As Fiordiligi, Kiri Te Kanawa was "magnificent", singing "in her best, creamiest voice". Aristocratic in "Come scoglio" and meditatively introspective in "Per pietà", she infused her role with tenderness and feminity. Her only fault was that she sometimes sang slightly flat. Frederica von Stade's Dorabella was "hardly less distinguished, with ample, broad phrasing, much well shaped detail in 'Smanie implacibili' and a graceful and spirited account of 'E' amore un ladroncello'." David Rendall, although sharing Te Kanawa's tendency to sing below the note, offered a Ferrando with the requisite honey for "Un' aura amorosa" and the requisite fire for "Tradito, schernito". Philippe Huttenlocher gave a "very polished performance" as Guglielmo, acting the part convincingly, using his words intelligently and bringing a laudable legato to "Non siate ritrosi". Jules Bastin's Alfonso was sung forcefully but without much expressiveness, a charge that could not be levelled at Teresa Stratas. Her Despina was vivid and extremely musical, but it was "a pity that she felt the need to squeak and squawk so grotesquely in her impersonations of a doctor and a notary". The chief failings of the album, though, had nothing to do with any of its soloists. The orchestral playing suffered from "a lack of finesse", and the conducting from a dearth of dramatic conviction and "a general lack of sparkle". Sadie did not take exception to Lombard's bias towards slow tempi, but he was disappointed that the album evinced no care over appoggiaturas. (A further instance of negligence was the clipping of bar 49 of "Come scoglio" by a clumsy editor.) Overall, the album was a good one, but not good enough to compete with the best of its many illustrious predecessors,

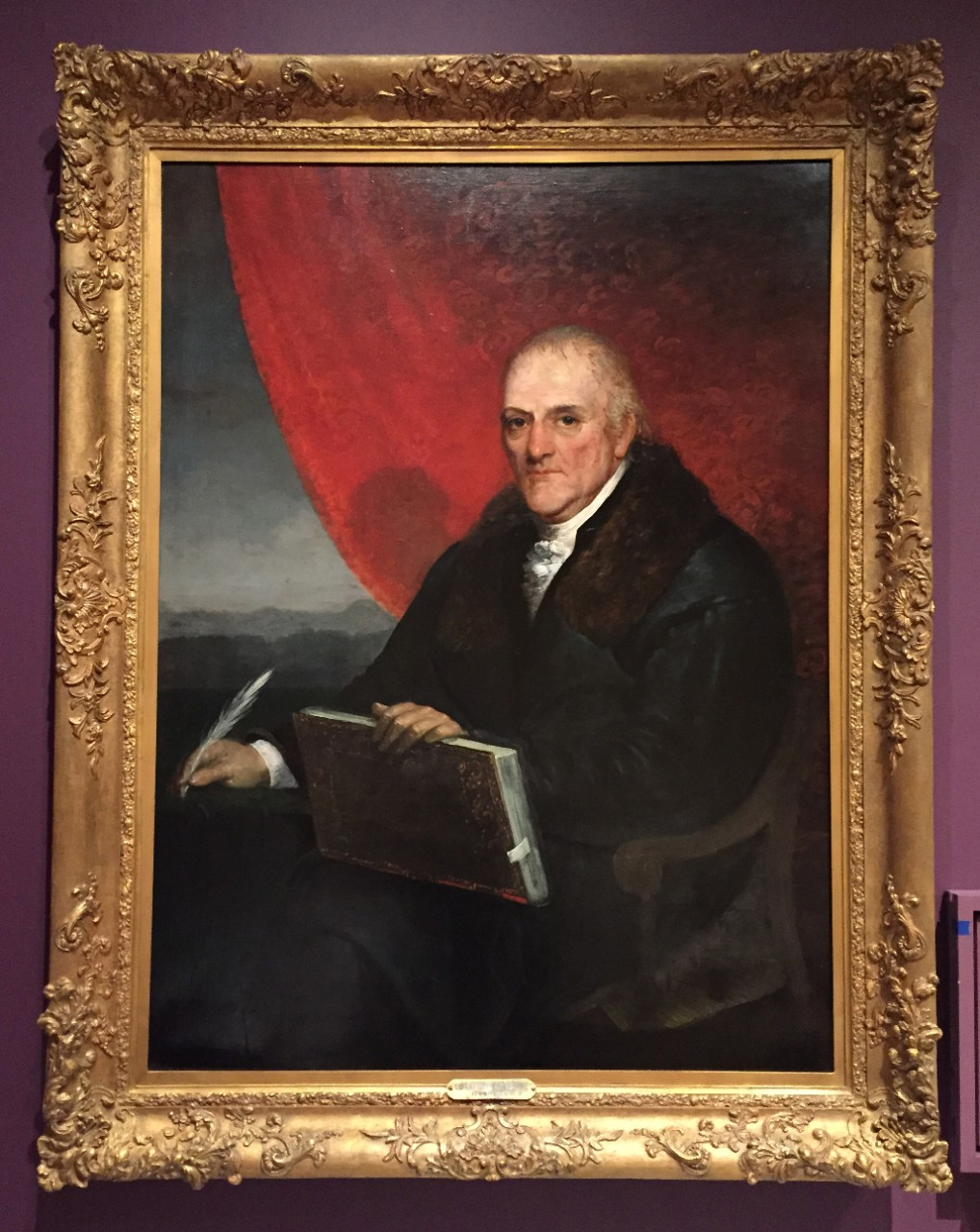
An unattributed portrait of Lorenzo da Ponte in the library of Columbia University

J. B. Steane reviewed the album on LP in Gramophone in July 1978. He was sad that it was one of those opera recordings in which excellence was betrayed by the mediocrity surrounding it. The excellence in question was provided by the two ladies from Ferrara. Kiri Te Kanawa sang Fiordiligi with an acute sensitivity to her music's meaning, her voice "at its most beautiful, warm and well-rounded". As Dorabella, Frederica von Stade was Te Kanawa's perfect foil, her timbre complementing the soprano's so well that their voices blended in their duets in a way that could hardly be bettered. But Teresa Stratas, although a vivid Despina, sang with a tone that gave little pleasure. As Guglielmo, Philippe Huttenlocher was "inelegant". As Ferrando, David Rendall sang with a piano tone that lacked focus and a forte that sounded muffled. And worst of all, Alain Lombard seemed unable to distinguish between passages where a slow tempo was heavenly and others where it was laughable. "Instead of placing the partnership of Te Kanawa and von Stade in the place where it belongs, classic in freshness, beauty and character", the album's flaws had in Steane's view consigned it to the margins of the Così fan tutte discography. "You do not wear a diamond in a leaden ring."

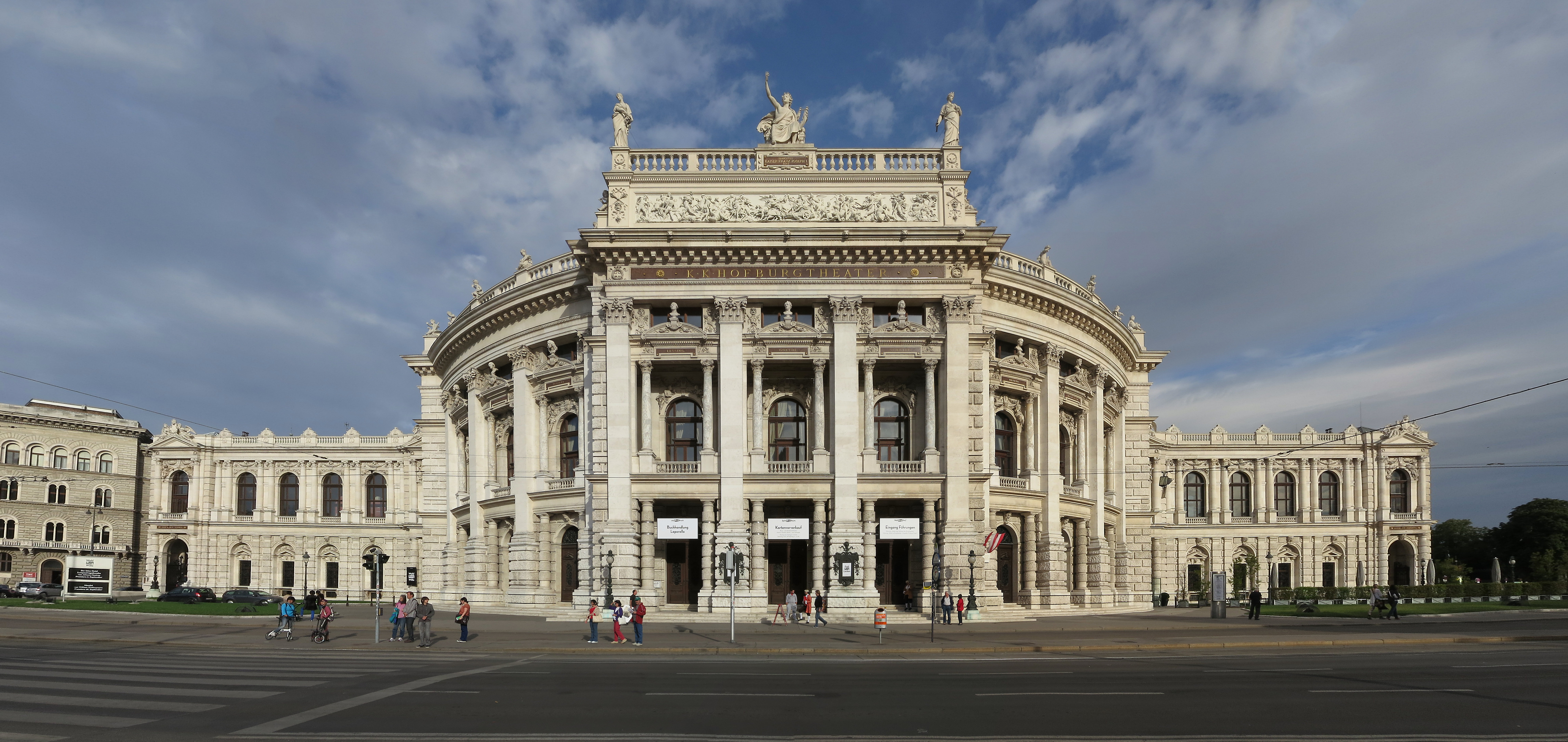
Vienna's Burgtheater, where Così fan tutte was first performed

George Jellinek reviewed the album on LP in Stereo Review in August 1978. Like Sadie and Steane, he singled out Kiri Te Kanawa for especial praise, lauding her "abundant musicality and tone of creamy richness throughout most of the range". However, he thought that the cruel vocal assault course that Mozart had created for Fiordiligi had been difficult for her to negotiate. Frederica von Stade sang just as beautifully, and it was not her fault if her timbre was too like Te Kanawa's to allow an ideal degree of contrast between them. Teresa Stratas was an older Despina than some, and she took the comedy of her notary too far, but the gaiety of her approach was mostly enjoyable. The album's gentlemen were not quite as impressive as its ladies. As Ferrando, David Rendall had an "agreeable and malleable light tenor" but his technique sometimes left something to be desired. Philippe Huttenlocher was a solid but bland Guglielmo. Jules Bastin sang stylishly, but without either the force or the comfortable upper notes that an Alfonso needed. Recitatives were hampered by some pedestrian harpsichord continuo work. The orchestra, if not the most sumptuous of ensembles, played with warmth and accuracy and was blessed with some first-rate woodwinds. Alain Lombard's conducting was animated and accommodating, although it was marred by an unfortunate bias towards slow tempi. The album's audio quality, if "not particularly spacious", was perfectly acceptable. All things considered, though, Lombard's Così fan tutte could not really compete with alternative recordings conducted by Karl Böhm, Erich Leinsdorf or Georg Solti.

== Track listing, CD1 ==
Wolfgang Amadeus Mozart (1756-1791)

Così fan tutte ossia La scuola degli amanti, drama giocoso in due atti, K. 588 (Vienna, 1790), libretto by Lorenzo da Ponte

- 1 (4:35) Ouvertura

Act One

Scene 1

- 2 (1:58) No.1 Terzetto: "La mia Dorabella capace non è" (Ferrando, Alfonso, Guglielmo)
- 3 (1:09) Recitativo: "Fuor la spada" (Ferrando, Alfonso, Guglielmo)
- 4 (1:17) No. 2 Terzetto: "E la fede delle femmine" (Ferrando, Alfonso, Guglielmo)
- 5 (1:25) Recitativo: "Scioccherie di poeti" (Ferrando, Alfonso, Guglielmo)
- 6 (2:17) No. 3 Terzetto: "Una bella serenata" (Ferrando, Alfonso, Guglielmo)

Scene 2

- 7 (5:02) No. 4 Duetto: "Ah, guarda, sorella" (Fiordiligi, Dorabella)
- 8 (1:16) Recitativo: "Mi par che stamattina volentieri" (Fiordiligi, Dorabella, Alfonso)

Scene 3

- 9 (0:41) No. 5 Aria: "Vorrei dir, e cor non ho" (Alfonso)
- 10 (1:04) Recitativo: "Stelle! Per carità, signor Alfonso" (Fiordiligi, Dorabella, Alfonso)

Scene 4

- 11 (4:25) No. 6 Quintetto: "Sento, oh Dio, che questo piede" (Fiordiligi, Dorabella, Ferrando, Alfonso, Guglielmo)
- 12 (0:32) Recitativo: "La commedia è graziosa" (Alfonso, Ferrando, Fiordiligi, Dorabella)

Scene 5

- 13 (1:35) No. 8 Coro: "Bella vita militar!" (Chorus)
- 14 (0:47) Recitativo: "Non v'è più tempo, amici" (Alfonso, Fiordiligi, Dorabella, Guglielmo, Ferrando)
- 15 (3:04) No. 9 Quintetto e coro: "Di scrivermi ogni giorno" (Fiordiligi, Dorabella, Guglielmo, Ferrando, Alfonso, Chorus)

Scene 6

- 16 (1:10) Recitativo: "Dove son?" (Fiordiligi, Dorabella, Alfonso)
- 17 (3:05) No. 10 Terzettino: "Soave sia il vento" (Fiordiligi, Dorabella, Alfonso)

Scene 7

- 18 (1:12) Recitativo: "Non son cattivo comico" (Alfonso)

Scene 8

- 19 (2:26) Recitativo: "Che vita maledetta" (Despina)

Scene 9

- Recitativo: "Madame, ecco la vostra colazione" (Despina, Fiordiligi, Dorabella)
- 20 (2:03) No. 11 Aria: "Smanie implacabili" (Dorabella)
- 21 (1:37) Recitativo: "Signora Dorabella" (Despina, Dorabella, Fiordiligi)
- 22 (2:34) No. 12 Aria: "In uomini, in soldati" (Despina)

Scene 10

- 23 (2:25) Recitativo: "Che silenzio! Che aspetto di tristezza" (Alfonso, Despina)

Scene 11

- 24 (4:42) No. 13 Sestetto: "Alla bella Despinetta" (Fiordiligi, Dorabella, Despina, Ferrando, Guglielmo, Alfonso)
- 25 (4:15) Recitativo: "Che sussurro!" (Alfonso, Dorabella, Fiordiligi, Ferrando, Guglielmo, Despina)
- 26 (4:25) No. 14 Aria: "Come scoglio immoto resta" (Fiordiligi)

== Track listing, CD2 ==
Act One, continued

Scene 11, continued

- 1 (1:04) Recitativo: "Ah non partite!" (Ferrando, Guglielmo, Alfonso, Dorabella, Fiordiligi)
- 2 (1:51) No. 15 Aria: "Non siate ritrosi" (Guglielmo)

Scene 12

- 3 (0:54) No. 16 Terzetto: "E voi ridete?" (Ferrando, Guglielmo, Alfonso)
- 4 (1:05) Recitativo: "Si può sapere un poco" (Alfonso, Guglielmo, Ferrando)
- 5 (5:05) No. 17 Aria: "Un' aura amorosa" (Ferrando)

Scenes 14, 15 and 16

- 6 (20:05) No. 18 Finale: "Ah, che tutta in un momento" (Fiordiligi, Dorabella, Ferrando, Alfonso, Guglielmo, Despina)

Act Two

Scene 1

- 7 (1:43) Recitativo: "Andate là, che siete" (Despina, Fiordiligi, Dorabella)
- 8 (3:01) No. 19 Aria: "Una donna a quindici anni" (Despina)

Scene 2

- 9 (1:43) Recitativo: "Sorella, cosa dici?" (Fiordiligi, Dorabella)
- 10 (3:13) No. 20 Duetto: "Prenderò quel brunettino" (Fiordiligi, Dorabella)

Scene 3

- 11 (0:22) Recitativo: "Ah, correte al giardino" (Alfonso, Despina)

Scene 4

- 12 (4:04) No. 21 Duetto con coro: "Secondate, aurette amiche" (Ferrando, Guglielmo, Chorus)
- 13 (0:48) Recitativo: "Cos'è tal mascherata?" (Alfonso, Fiordiligi, Dorabella, Despina, Ferrando, Guglielmo)
- 14 (2:41) No. 22 Quartetto: "La mano a me date" (Despina, Ferrando, Guglielmo, Alfonso)

Scene 5

- 15 (2:47) Recitativo: "Oh che bella giornata!" (Fiordiligi, Ferrando, Dorabella, Guglielmo)
- 16 (5:11) No. 23 Duetto: "Il core vi dono, bell' idolo mio" (Dorabella, Guglielmo)

== Track listing, CD3 ==
Act Two, continued

Scene 6

- 1 (1:41) Recitativo: "Barbara! Perché fuggi?" (Ferrando, Fiordiligi)

Scene 7

- 2 (1:48) Recitativo: "Ei parte..." (Fiordiligi)
- 3 (8:03) No. 25 Rondo: "Per pietà, ben mio" (Fiordiligi)

Scene 8

- 4 (2:54) Recitativo: "Amico, abbiamo vinto!" (Ferrando)
- 5 (3:13) No. 26 Aria: "Donne mie, la fate e tanti" (Guglielmo)

Scene 9

- 6 (1:23) Recitativo: "In qual fiero contrasto" (Ferrando)
- 7 (2:07) No. 27 Cavatina: "Tradito, schernito" (Ferrando)
- 8 (1:27) Recitativo: "Bravo, questa è costanza" (Alfonso, Ferrando, Guglielmo)

Scene 10

- 9 (1:29) Recitativo: "Ora vedo che siete" (Despina, Dorabella, Fiordiligi)
- 10 (3:38) No. 28 Aria: "E' amore un ladroncello" (Dorabella)

Scene 11

- 11 (1:48) Recitativo: "Comme tutto congiura" (Fiordiligi, Guglielmo, Despina, Alfonso)

Scene 12

- Recitativo: "L'abito di Ferrando" (Fiordiligi, Despina, Guglielmo)
- 12 (7:04) No. 29 Duetto: "Fra gli amplessi in pochi istante" (Fiordiligi, Ferrando)

Scene 13

- 13 (2:05) Recitativo: "Oh poveretto me" (Alfonso, Guglielmo, Ferrando)
- 14 (0:59) No. 30 Andante: "Tutti accusan le donne" (Alfonso, Guglielmo)

Scene 14

- 15 (0:47) Recitativo: "Vittoria, padroncini!" (Despina, Ferrando, Alfonso, Guglielmo)

Scenes 15, 16, 17 and 18

- 16 (20:24) No. 31 Finale: "Fate presto, o cari amici" (Fiordiligi, Dorabella, Despina, Ferrando, Guglielmo, Alfonso)

== Personnel ==
=== Musical ===
- Kiri Te Kanawa (soprano), Fiordiligi, a lady of Ferrara, sister of Dorabella
- Frederica von Stade (mezzo-soprano), Dorabella, a lady of Ferrara, sister of Fiordiligi
- Teresa Stratas (soprano), Despina, maidservant of Fiordiligi and Dorabella
- Philippe Huttenlocher (baritone), Guglielmo, an army officer, in love with Fiordiligi
- David Rendall (tenor), Ferrando, an army officer, in love with Dorabella
- Jules Bastin (bass), Don Alfonso, an elderly philosopher
- Luciano Sgrizzi, harpsichord continuo
- Choeurs de l'Opéra du Rhin (chorus master: Gunter Wagner)
- Strasbourg Philharmonic Orchestra
- Alain Lombard, conductor

=== Other ===
- Michel Garcin, producer
- Pierre Lavoix, balance engineer
- Françoise Garcin, editor
- Charles Schwarz, assistant
- Monique Mathon, musical assistant

== Release history ==
In 1978, Erato released the album in Europe as a set of three LPs (catalogue number STU 71110) with literature providing notes, texts, translations and several photographs taken during the recording process. Also in 1978, RCA (under licence from Erato) released the album in the USA on both LP (catalogue number FRL3-2629) and cassette (catalogue number FRK3-2629), the LPs again being accompanied by notes, texts and translations.

In 1991, Erato issued the album on CD (catalogue number 2292-45683-2) in their "Libretto" series, packaged in a slipcase with a 264-page booklet providing an essay about the opera by André Tubeuf in English, French and German and the libretto of the opera in English, French, German and Italian. The booklet's only illustration was a photograph of Lombard by Jacques Sarrat. In 2010, Erato reissued the album on CD in revised packaging in their "Erato Opera Collection" series.

== See also ==
- Frederica von Stade chante Monteverdi & Cavalli
