= David Rendall =

English operatic tenor (1948–2025)

- Born: 11 October 1948; London, England
- Died: 21 July 2025 (aged 76); New Forest, Hampshire, England
- Education: Royal Academy of Music; Mozarteum
- Occupation: Operatic tenor
- Years active: 1975–2016
- Spouse: Diana Montague (m. 1990)
- Children: 6
- Website: davidrendalltenor.wordpress.com

David Montague Rendall (11 October 1948 – 21 July 2025) was an English operatic tenor who developed an international career performing regularly at the Royal Opera House in London and the Metropolitan Opera in New York City. His roles included Ferrando in Mozart's Così fan tutte and other Mozart roles, Almaviva in Rossini's The Barber of Seville and Matteo in R. Strauss's Arabella. He appeared at leading opera houses in Europe, the United States and Japan, growing into heavier roles such as Verdi's Otello and Wagner's Lohengrin.

== Life and career ==
Rendall was born in London on 11 October 1948. Although he sang in a skiffle group while in secondary school, Rendall originally had no intention to sing opera professionally. He was discovered while working in the Gramophone Library at the BBC, sorting records for Desert Island Discs. A producer for the show heard him singing "Questa o quella" from Rigoletto while working, and suggested he study professionally.

Rendall studied voice at the Royal Academy of Music between 1970 and 1973 with Olive Groos and Alexander Young, and at the Mozarteum in Salzburg from 1973. He won a Young Musician of the Year Award from the Greater London Arts Association in 1973 and received a Gulbenkian Fellowship in 1975.

=== Opera ===
==== United Kingdom ====
In 1974 Rendall joined the choir of the Glyndebourne Touring Company, and in 1975 he joined the choir of the Glyndebourne Festival, making his official stage debut as Ferrando in Mozart's Così fan tutte with the Glyndebourne Touring Company, and in 1976 performed the role with great success on the festival stage, where he later appeared in 1988 as Belmonte in Mozart's Die Entführung aus dem Serail, in 1989 as Tom Rakewell in Stravinsky's The Rake's Progress, and as Gabriele Adorno in Verdi's Simon Boccanegra in 1998.

Rendall debuted at the Royal Opera House in London on 20 November 1975, performing as the Italian singer in Strauss's Der Rosenkavalier. He continued to perform there until 1990, performing roles such as Don Ottavio in Mozart's Don Giovanni, Almaviva in Rossini's The Barber of Seville, Des Grieux in Massenet's Manon, Matteo in Strauss's Arabella, Giacomo in Rossini's La donna del lago, the Young sailor in Wagner's Tristan und Isolde, Flamand in Strauss's Capriccio, and the Duke in Verdi's Rigoletto.

Rendall also performed with the English National Opera from 1976 to 1999, in roles such as Leicester in Donizetti's Maria Stuarda, the Verdi's Duke in Rigoletto and the title role of Otello (1998), Puccini's Rodolfo in La bohème Rodolfo, Pinkerton in Madama Butterfly, Cavaradossi in Tosca (1996) and Luigi in Il tabarro (1998), Don José in Bizet's Carmen, Erik in Wagner's The Flying Dutchman (both 1997), and Faust in Boito's Mefistofele (1999).

==== Canada and United States ====
Rendall first appeared in the Americas in 1977 as Tamino in Mozart's Die Zauberflöte in Ottawa. He performed as Rodolfo in La bohème at the New York City Opera in 1978. In 1978 and during the 1980/81 season, he sang at the San Francisco Opera. He first appeared at the Metropolitan Opera in New York City in 1980 as Ernesto in Donizetti's Don Pasquale, he returned as Don Ottavio, subsequently performing as Belmonte, the title role of Mozart's La clemenza di Tito, as Ferrando in 1983, as Lensky in Tchaikovsky's Eugene Onegin, Alfred in Die Fledermaus by Johann Strauss, Matteo in Arabella, and the title role of Mozart's Idomeneo in 1986. He appeared there in a total of 134 performances, the last being in April 1988 as Ferrando. He performed at the Portland Opera as Canio in Leoncavallo's Pagliacci in 1997.

==== Europe ====
In September 1978, Rendall he made his debut at the Vienna State Opera as Ottavio in Don Giovanni, and in January–February 1988 returned as Matteo in Arabella. In concert, Rendall performed the tenor solo of Bruckner's Te Deum conducted by Herbert von Karajan during a performance at the Musikverein hall with the Vienna Philharmonic in 1978. He first appeared at La Scala in Milan in The Rake's Progress in 1979. He performed with many companies in Ireland, Denmark, Germany and Georgia.

In 1983 he sang as Faust in Berlioz's La Damnation de Faust in Lyon. In 1987 he sang at the Théâtre des Champs-Élysées in Paris as Tamino. Rendall appeared at the Bastille Opera in 1991 as Tamino, and at the Leipzig Opera in 1992 in the title role of Massenet's Werther. He sang Don Antonio in the world premiere of Roberto Gerhard's opera The Duenna at the Teatro Zarzuela Madrid in 1992. He appeared as Wagner's Lohengrin at the Opéra du Rhin in 1994. In 1997, he performed in a BBC radio broadcast as François in Korngold's Die Kathrin. He appeared in the title role of Offenbach's Les contes d'Hoffmann at the Teatro Carlo Felice in Genoa in 1998.

==== Incident ====
Rendall was involved in an incident in 1998 during a rehearsal at the Florentine Opera of the final death scene in Leoncavallo's I Pagliacci, when he accidentally stabbed baritone Kimm Julian; the switchblade-style knife that the Milwaukee opera company used failed to collapse, and the baritone received a 3-inch-deep (76 mm) cut into his abdomen. Julian recovered and police cleared Rendall of any wrongdoing.

==== Later career, injury and comeback ====
In July 2002, he performed at La Scala as Otello, also singing the company's guest performance in Japan in 2003. He appeared as Otello also at the Semperoper in Dresden in 2002.

During a performance as Radamès in Verdi's Aida at the Royal Opera in Copenhagen in April 2005, Rendall suffered severe injuries from the collapse of a stage set, his hip was shattered and his shoulders an left knee were damaged as well. Subsequently, his career was temporarily curtailed. In the months following his fall he underwent a hip replacement, followed by a knee joint replacement and extensive shoulder surgery.

Subsequently, due to a lack of engagements following his injuries, he appeared only occasionally, beginning with Otello at the National Opera of Chile in May 2006, as Dushyanta in a revival of Alfano's Sakùntala at the Teatro dell'Opera di Roma on 21 April 2006, as Tristan in Tristan und Isolde at the same venue in November 2006, and as Riccardo in Verdi's Un ballo in maschera, again at the National Opera of Chile in June 2008. An important comeback concert also took place in London in June 2013, singing alongside mezzo-soprano Diana Montague, soprano Teodora Gheorghiu and pianist David Owen Norris. In 2015 he took up a teaching position at the Royal Academy of Music, and started giving private lessons in his Hampshire home. He appeared in the summer of 2016 as Triquet in Eugene Onegin at the Dorset Opera Festival.

He was noted for "thrilling bravura delivery, his consistent legato line and, in various languages, his excellent diction. After his accident "he maintained a determinedly buoyant attitude... and keeping a colourful blog" which featured anecdotes from his stage career.

== Personal life and death ==
Rendall was married twice. In 1974, he married his first wife, Kathryn George and they had a son and a daughter. The couple subsequently divorced.

In February 1990, Rendall married the mezzo-soprano Diana Montague. They had met during productions of Così fan tutte and Idomeneo at the Met. The couple had four children, one of whom is the baritone Huw Montague Rendall. They lived in Brockenhurst, Hampshire.

Rendall died in Brockenhurst on 21 July 2025, aged 76, following a long illness.

== Recordings ==
Rendall was the tenor in a recording of Beethoven's Missa solemnis for Deutsche Harmonia Mundi in 1977. He took part in the 1978 recording of Così fan tutte with the Strasbourg Philharmonic Orchestra, conducted by Alain Lombard. That same year he performed the role of Lucarnio in Handel's Ariodante. He recorded the Requiem by Berlioz, conducted by Michael Gielen in 1979; Donizetti's Maria Stuarda with Charles Mackerras and the English National Opera in 1982; In 1983 he participated in the DVD recording of The Metropolitan Opera Centennial Gala, conducted by James Levine, for Deutsche Grammophon. Randall took a role in a recording of Puccini's La rondine with Lorin Maazel and the London Symphony Orchestra in 1985. Also in 1985, he participated in a recording of Mozart's Requiem for EMI, conducted by Daniel Barenboim. He sang Enoch Snow in an MCA recording of Carousel in 1988, and in 1990, Rendall participated in a recording by Jay Productions of Romberg's The Student Prince, alongside his wife. That same year he also was part of a Chandos recording of Elgar's The Apostles, conducted by Richard Hickox. In his latter years, Rendall sang François in a recording of Korngold's Die Kathrin with Martyn Brabbins conducting the BBC Concert Orchestra in 1998.
