= Marko Letonja =

Slovenian conductor (born 1961)

- Born: 12 August 1961 (age 64)
- Origin: Slovenia
- Occupation: Conductor

Marko Letonja (born 12 August 1961) is a Slovenian conductor.

== Biography ==
Letonja studied piano and conducting at the Academy of Music in Ljubljana, where his conducting teachers included Anton Nanut. He continued his conducting studies at the Vienna University of Music and Performing Arts, with such teachers as Otmar Suitner. He graduated from the Vienna University of Music and Performing Arts in 1989.

From 1996 to 2002, Letonja was chief conductor of the Slovenian Philharmonic Orchestra, and from 2003 to 2006, he held the same position with Sinfonieorchester Basel. From 2011 through the end of 2018, Letonja was chief conductor and artistic director of the Tasmanian Symphony Orchestra (TSO). He now has the title of conductor laureate of the TSO.

In 2012, Letonja became music director of the Orchestre Philharmonique de Strasbourg, and held the post through 2021. In 2018, he became chief conductor of the Bremer Philharmoniker.

== Awards and nominations ==
=== ARIA Music Awards ===
The ARIA Music Awards is an annual awards ceremony held by the Australian Recording Industry Association. They commenced in 1987.

Year	Nominee / work	Award	Result	Ref.
2014	Mozart Arias (with (Emma Matthews & Tasmanian Symphony Orchestra)	Best Classical Album	Nominated	

Cultural offices
Preceded by Uroš Lajovic (acting principal conductor)	Principal Conductor, Slovenian Philharmonic Orchestra; 1996–2002	Succeeded by George Pehlivanian
Preceded by Mario Venzago	Chief Conductor, Sinfonieorchester Basel; 2003–2006	Succeeded by Dennis Russell Davies
Preceded by Sebastian Lang-Lessing	Chief Conductor and Artistic Director, Tasmanian Symphony Orchestra; 2011–2018	Succeeded by Eivind Aadland
Preceded by Marc Albrecht	Music Director, Orchestre Philharmonique de Strasbourg; 2012–2021	Succeeded by Aziz Shokhakimov
Preceded by Markus Poschner	Chief Conductor, Bremer Philharmoniker; 2018–present	Succeeded by incumbent
