= Palais des Fêtes =

Music venue in the Neustadt district of Strasbourg in France

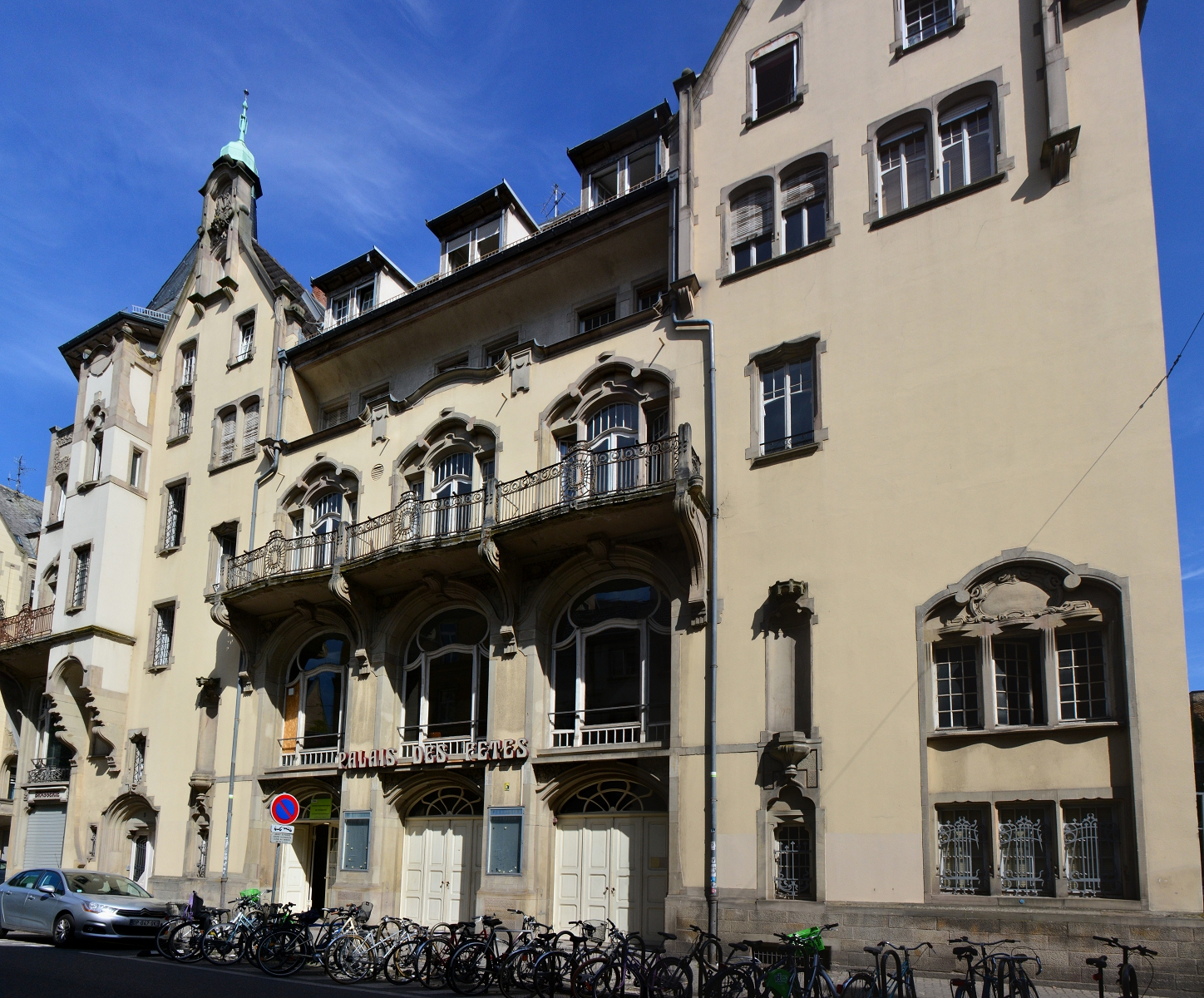
- Façade on the Rue Sellénick seen in 2015

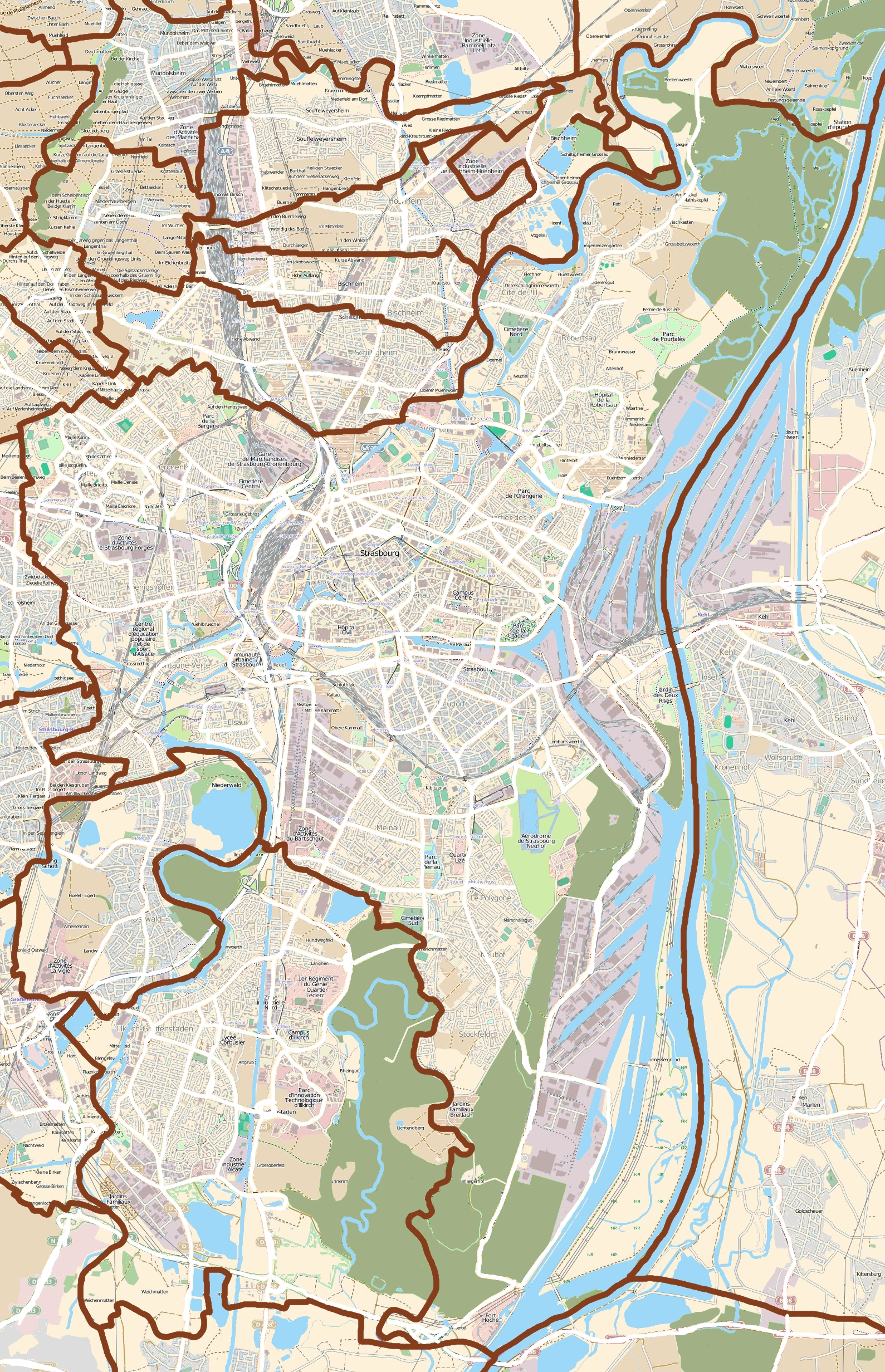
- Location within Strasbourg
- Former names: Sängerhaus

General information
- Type: Performance venue
- Architectural style: Art Nouveau, Beaux-Arts
- Location: Strasbourg, France, 5 rue Sellénick, 67000 Strasbourg
- Coordinates: 48°35′27″N 7°44′57″E
- Construction started: 1900
- Completed: 1903; 1921
- Inaugurated: 31 January 1903
- Renovated: 2012–2022
- Owner: City of Strasbourg

Design and construction
- Architects: Joseph Müller; Richard Kuder; Paul Dopff

The Palais des Fêtes (Festival Palace) is a music venue in the Neustadt district of Strasbourg, in the French department of the Bas-Rhin. Built for the male choral society of Strasbourg (German: Strassburger Männergesangverein) (Note: Founded in 1872. Not to be confused with the Straßburger Männergesangsverein of Straßburg, Austria, founded in 1892.) in 1903, it has served as the principal concert hall of the city and home to the Orchestre philharmonique de Strasbourg until 1975. It has been classified as a monument historique since 2007.

Well known conductors such as Gustav Mahler, Richard Strauss, Charles Munch, Bruno Walter, Wilhelm Furtwängler, Herbert von Karajan, Karel Ančerl, Pierre Boulez and Lorin Maazel, among others, have all conducted guest concerts in the Palais.

== History ==
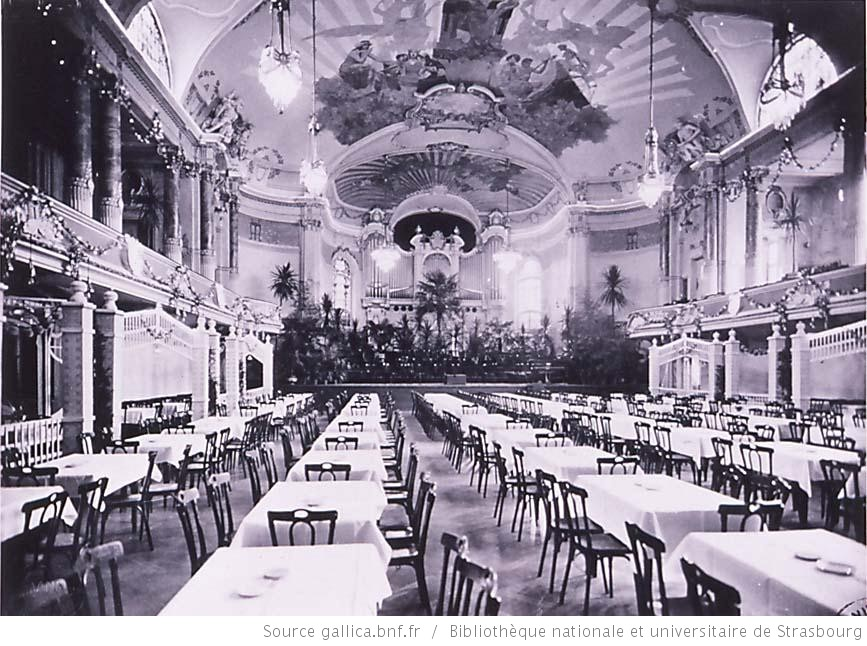
The concert hall in 1909 prior to the inauguration of the pipe organ

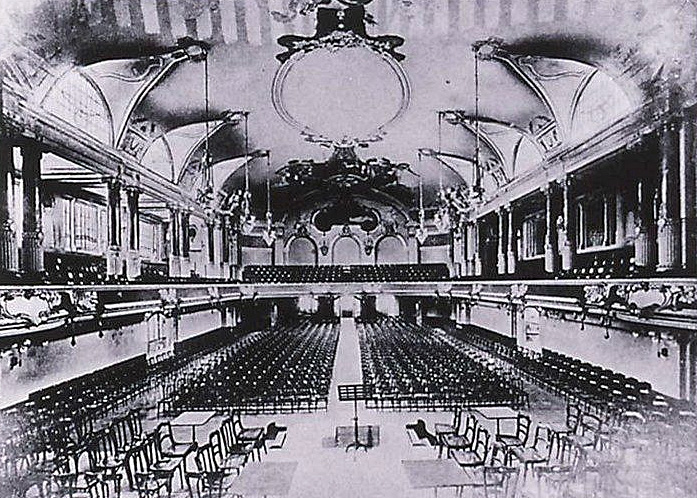
The concert hall, looking in the opposite direction, circa 1905/1910

The Palais des Fêtes was built as the Sängerhaus (singer's house) between 1901 and 1903, when Strasbourg was a German city and the capital of Alsace-Lorraine. It was one of the first buildings in Strasbourg to make use of reinforced concrete. Although the architects Joseph Müller (1863–??) and Richard Kuder (1852–1912) chose an Art Nouveau style for the building, the main auditorium − surface: 800 m^{2} (8,600 sq ft) [or 850 m^{2} (9,100 sq ft) according to other sources], height: 14 m (46 ft), seating capacity: 1,300 – was decorated in a lavish Neo-Baroque style. The building also included a restaurant large enough to accommodate up to 300 guests. The inauguration concert took place on 31 January 1903. In 1904, the premises were already considered too small and a new story was added on the current Rue de Phalsbourg, including a rehearsal room now called Salle Balanchine. A pipe organ was installed in the main hall in 1909. A work by builders Dalstein & Hærpfer, it was designed, like several other pipe organs in Strasbourg (for instance the choir pipe organ of Saint-Thomas church), according to principles by Albert Schweitzer.

Plans to further expand the size and capacity of the Sängerhaus by adding a new wing at the rear were set up shortly before World War I. Strasbourg was again a French city when work was finally conducted. Architect Paul Dopff (1885–1965) added a wing in a more severe style, closer to Beaux-Arts architecture, in 1921. That wing was centred around a great room for choir rehearsals called Salle de la Marseillaise.

The inner decoration of the main auditorium was completely modified in 1933 according to principles of New Objectivity. The stucco and chandeliers were all removed, the organ case lost most of its ornaments. The other parts of the building mostly retained their Art Nouveau decoration and elements, including stained glass and door handles.

During World War II, the basement of the Palais served as an air-raid shelter. Although Strasbourg was bombed several times in 1944, the Palais was not hit.

Since the Orchestre philharmonique moved out of the Palais des Fêtes and into the Palais de la musique et des congrès in 1975, the 1903 venue has still served for concerts, but less frequently. It is still home to La Philharmonie, a medium-sized semi-professional orchestra founded in 1900 that performs three times a year, and occasionally hosts jazz, rock, gospel and other non-classical music genres. The Marseillaise wing is home to the municipal ballet school (French: Centre chorégraphique de Strasbourg). The Sängerhaus wing also regularly hosts conventions such as the anime convention ″Japan Addict".

The Palais des Fêtes is undergoing restoration since 2011 and until 2021; the concert hall was expected to be ready in December 2019 and an inaugural symphonic concert was scheduled for 31 January 2020, but on 24 January 2020, it was announced that the opening would be delayed until autumn of the same year. Restoration began with the Marseillaise wing, whose central courtyard was covered with a glass roof in order to create an atrium. Remains of the Neo-Baroque vault ornaments from 1903 were unexpectedly rediscovered in 2018.

== Layout ==
The main entrance to the Palais is on the Rue Sellénick, a street created in 1888 (original name: Julianstraße). The entrance to the rear wing is on the Boulevard Clémenceau, a street created in 1881 (original name: Steinring). The whole complex takes up half of the square block delimited (clockwise) by the Boulevard Clémenceau, the Rue Specklin, the Rue Sellénick, and the Rue de Phalsbourg. It does not, however, stand out in height from its immediate surroundings. The only conspicuous element is the octagonal tower at the corner of the Rue Sellénick and the Rue de Phalsbourg, structurally (but not stylistically) close to the tower of the Mulhouse courthouse (French: tribunal d'instance) designed by the same two architects and inaugurated in 1902.

== Gallery ==
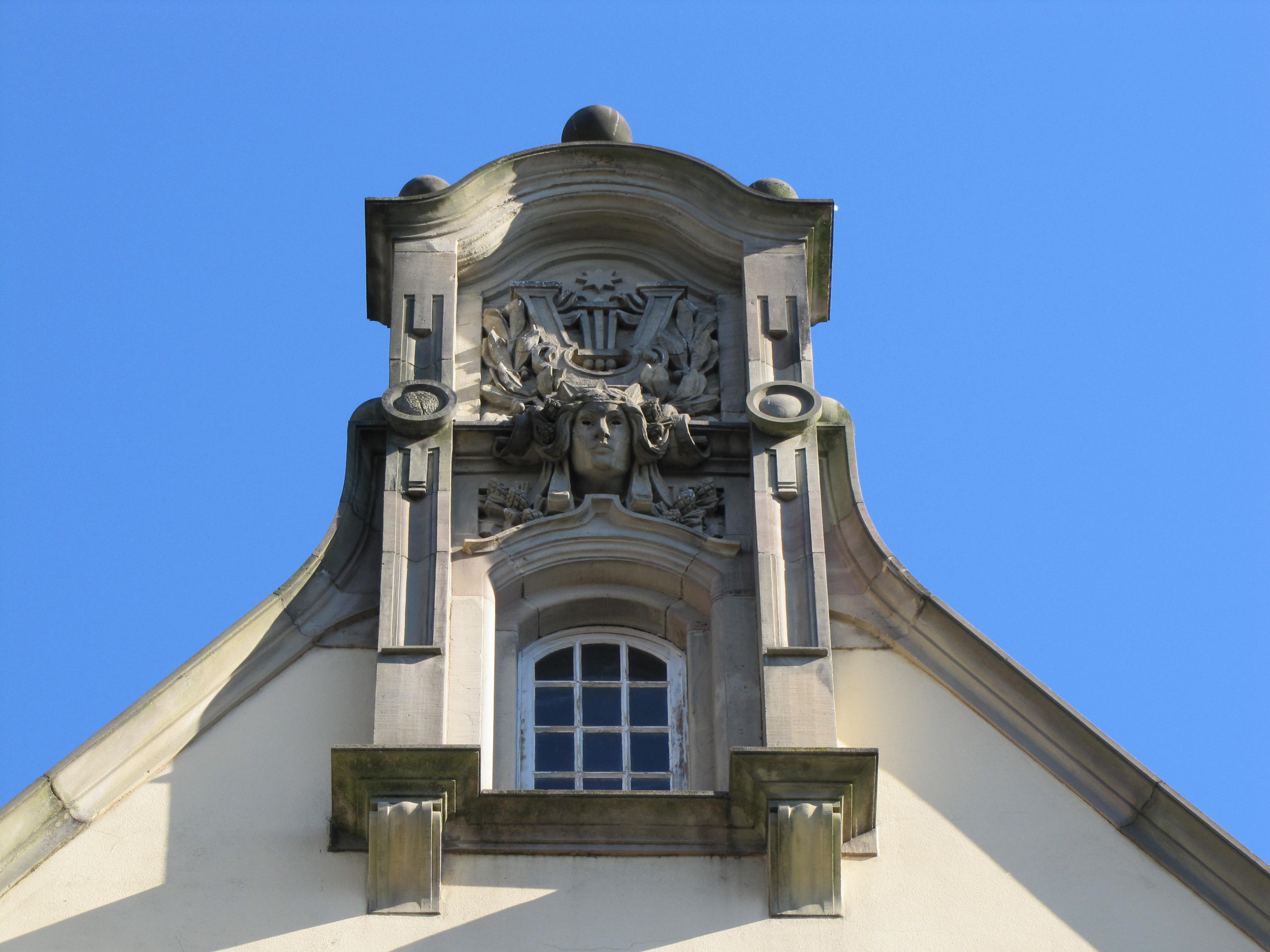
Detail of the façade on the Rue Sellénick

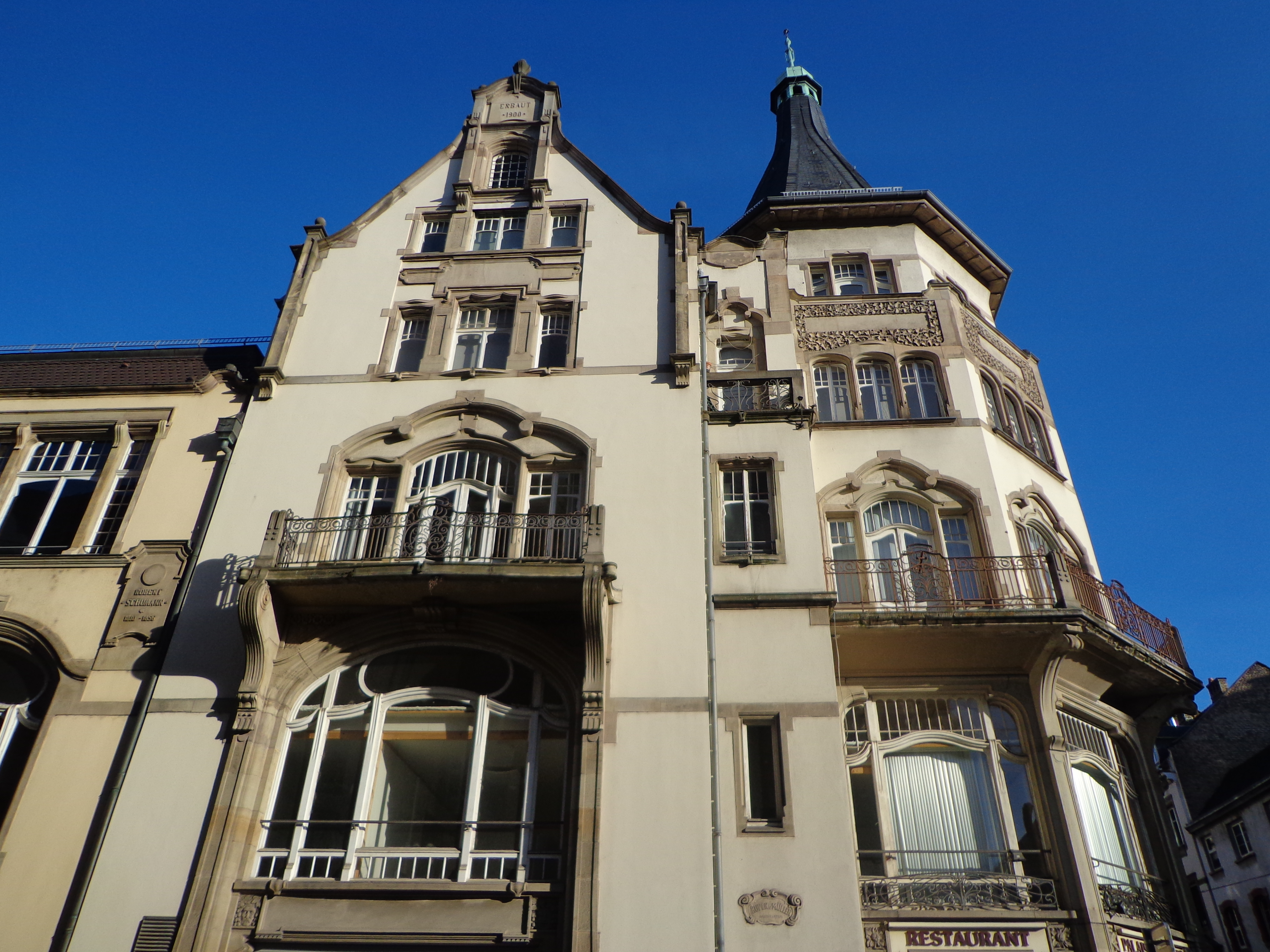
Corner tower seen in 2015

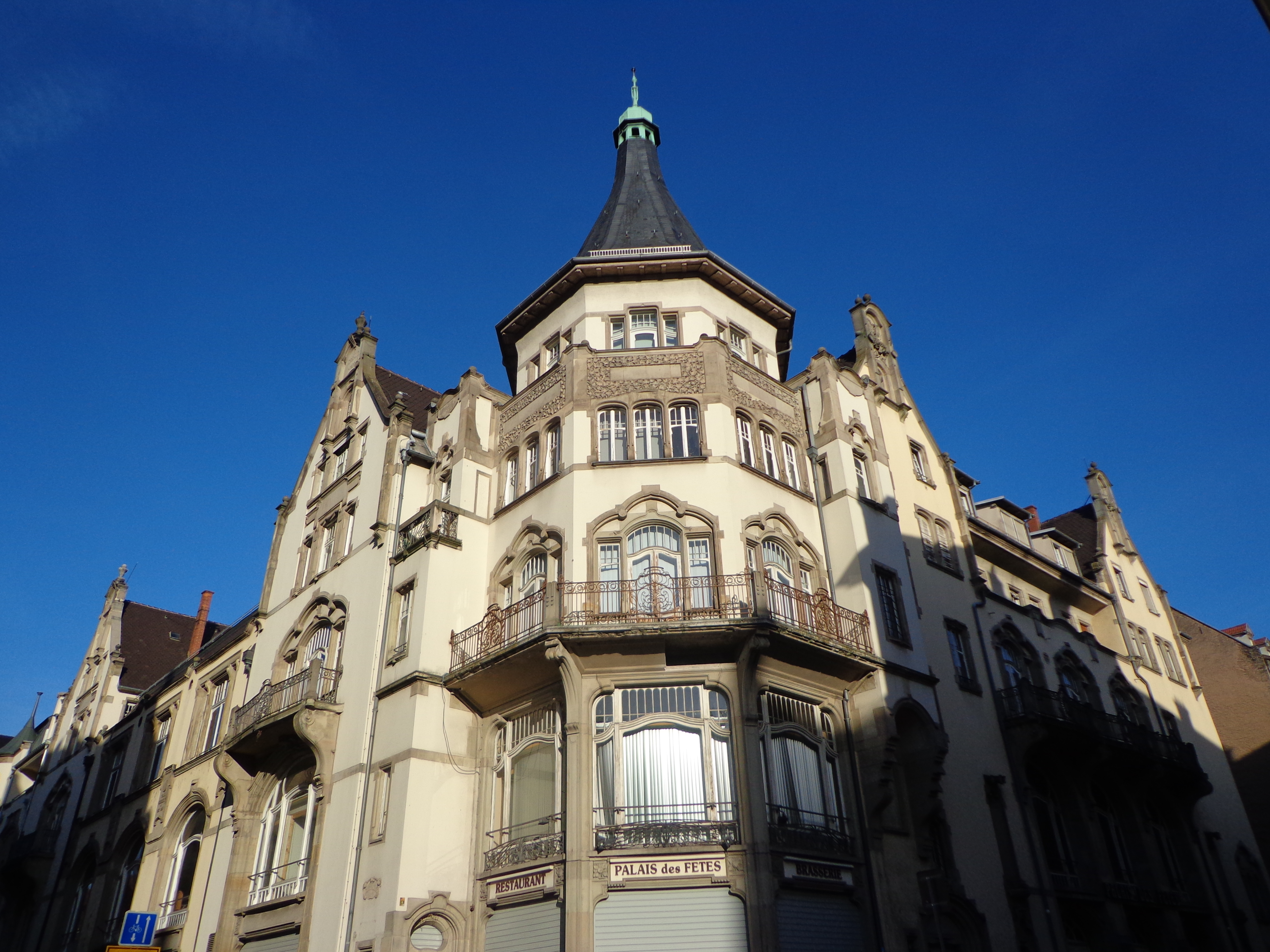
Corner tower seen in 2015

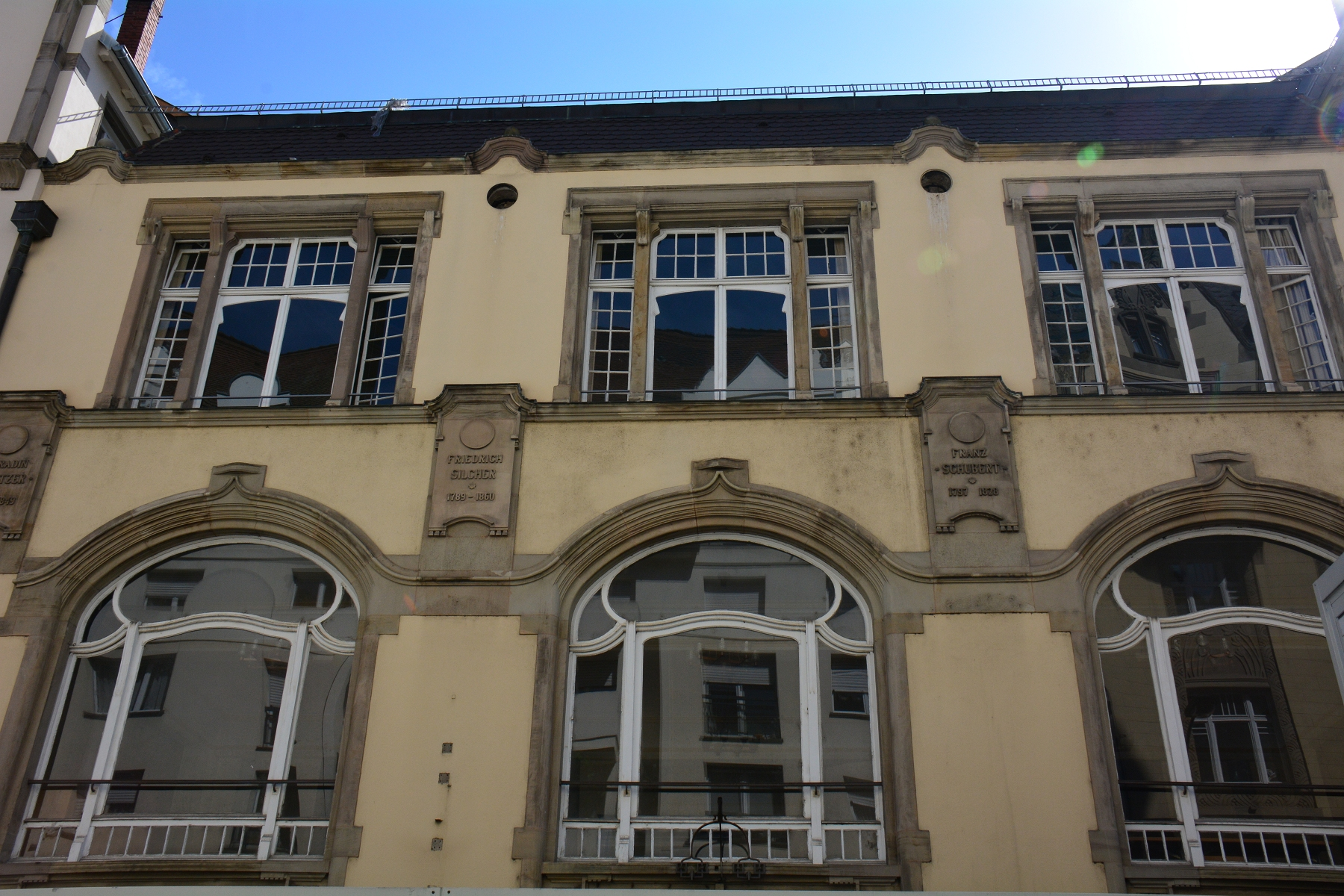
Façade on the Rue de Phalsbourg (detail): lower part built in 1903, upper part added in 1904

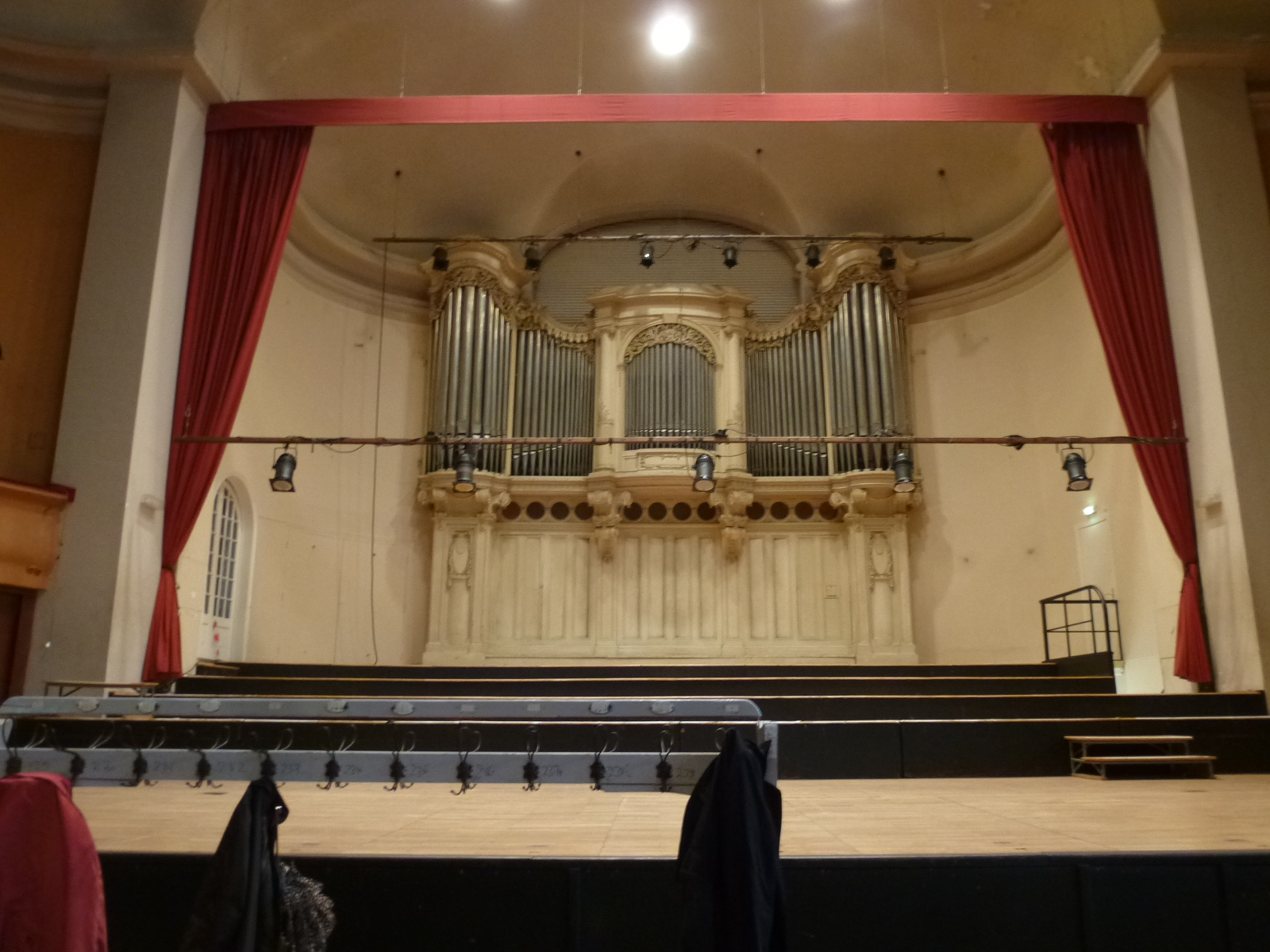
Pipe organ and stage of concert hall seen in 2013

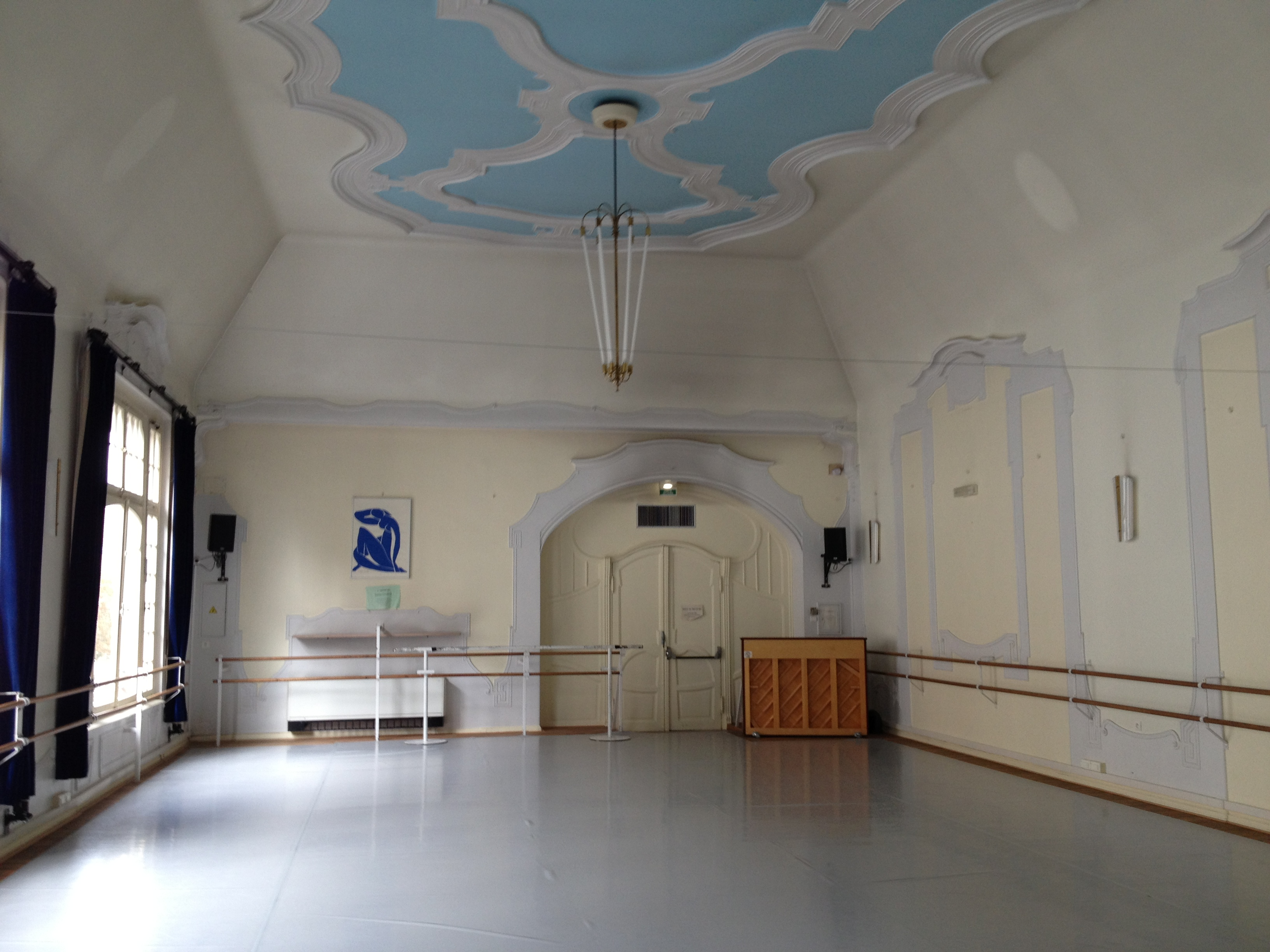
Salle Balanchine (1904), now used by the ballet school, seen in 2013

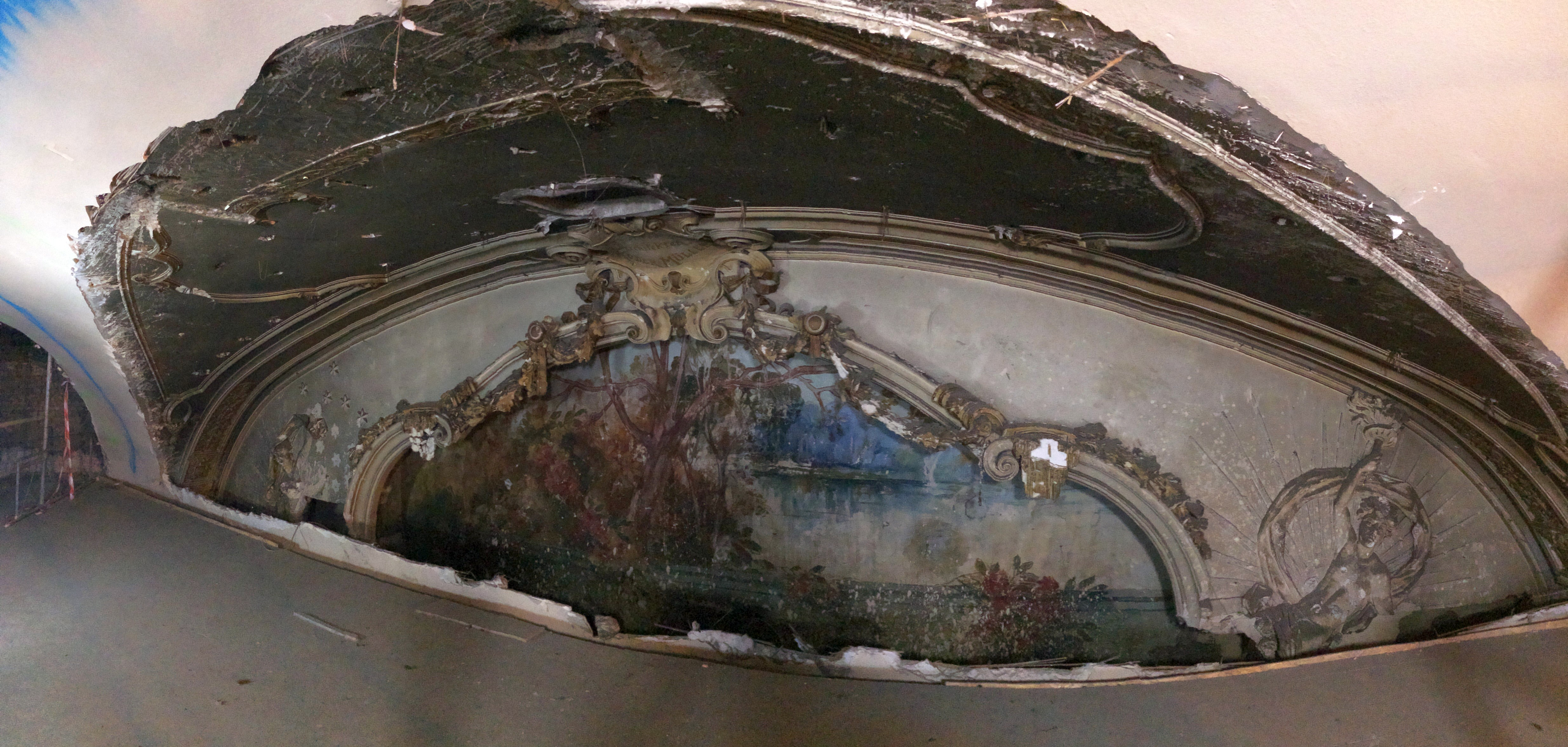
Stucco and a fresco from 1903, as rediscovered in 2018 (picture taken in 2019)

== See also ==
- Strasbourg Opera House
- Strasbourg Music Festival
