= Strasbourg Music Festival =

The Strasbourg Music Festival (Festival de Musique de Strasbourg) (also International Music Festival in Strasbourg) was a prominent annual two-week festival of classical music. It took place in Strasbourg (Alsace), France every month of June. The festival was founded in 1932 and has been organised by the Strasbourg Friends of Music Society. Due to budget constraints, it was brought to a sudden halt in 2014, a few days before the start of the 76th edition.

The Festival's usual venue had been the Palais des Fêtes and, after 1975, the Palais de la musique et des congrès.

== See also ==
- Musica (French music festival)
