= Frederica von Stade chante Monteverdi & Cavalli =

Monteverdi & Cavalli Arias
- Erato CD: ECD 88100

Studio album by Frederica von Stade
- Released: 1985 (first version), 1995 (second version)
- Studios: Queen's Hall, Edinburgh and Palais de la Musique et des Congrès, Strasbourg (second version only)
- Genre: Opera
- Length: 48:51 (first version), 54:35 (second version)
- Language: Italian
- Label: Erato
- Producer: Michel Garcin

Cavalli, Monteverdi & Mozart Arias
- Erato CD: 4509-98504-2

Frederica von Stade chante Monteverdi & Cavalli is a 48-minute studio album of arias by Francesco Cavalli and songs and arias by Claudio Monteverdi, performed by von Stade with the Scottish Chamber Orchestra under the direction of Raymond Leppard. It was released in 1985. A second, 54-minute version of the album, released in 1995 as Recital: Frederica von Stade: Cavalli, Monteverdi & Mozart Arias, added two bonus arias taken from Erato's 1978 recording of Mozart's Così fan tutte, on which von Stade sang Dorabella with the Orchestre Philharmonique de Strasbourg under Alain Lombard.

== Recording ==
The first version of the album was digitally recorded in July 1984 in the Queen's Hall, Edinburgh. The Mozart arias on the second version of the album were recorded using analogue technology in May 1977 in the Palais de la Musique et des Congrès, Strasbourg.

== Packaging ==
The cover of the first version of the album was designed by Daniel et Compagnie, and features a photograph of von Stade taken by her then husband, Peter Elkus. The cover of the second version of the album was designed by Thierry Cohen, and features a photograph of von Stade taken by Colette Masson.

== Critical reception ==
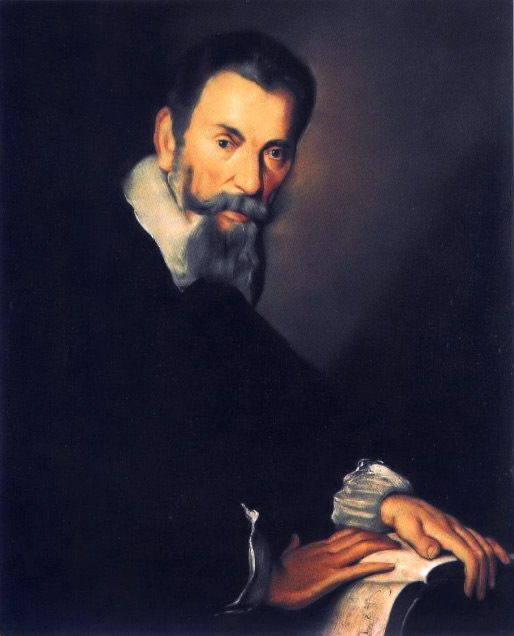
Claudio Monteverdi painted by Bernardo Strozzi in Venice in 1640

Alan Blyth reviewed the first version of the album on LP in Gramophone in September 1985. He warned his readers that all its music was performed in Raymond Leppard's own, controversial realizations. On the one hand, some listeners would "delight in [their] sheer sensuousness"; on the other, people who placed a premium on fidelity to Monteverdi's and Cavalli's intentions would "protest that this isn't really how the music should sound". He himself felt ambivalent, relishing the album's euphony while acknowledging that it was not historically authentic. He was in two minds about Frederica von Stade's singing also. The timbre of her voice, touching though it was, did not vary from item to item as much as it ideally should have done. Her words were not infused with sufficient meaning. Other mezzos had sung Ottavia's two anguished arias more passionately. Plumbing profound depths of feeling was not, perhaps, a task to which von Stade was especially suited. On the positive side, the album's "languishing" songs by Monteverdi were more successful, as were its arias by the less emotionally demanding Cavalli. It was true, too, that von Stade sang with more "consistently even tone" than some of her predecessors in the album's repertoire, and that, "an experienced artist in baroque opera", she scarcely perpetrated an unstylistic note from the first bar of her LP to the last. Erato's balance engineer had done his work very well: all in all, the disc was one that von Stade's fans would be guaranteed to enjoy.

Ivan March reviewed the first version of the album on cassette in Gramophone in February 1986. He was more comfortable with Leppard's realizations than Blyth had been, writing approvingly that the conductor had not sought "to produce an anaemic 'authentic' back-up from the orchestra, who support the voice with the most attractive string textures". He did agree with Blyth about von Stade's limitations as an interpreter, regretting that her singing did not offer "the kind of emotional depth we would expect from an artist like Dame Janet Baker". But von Stade had sung stylishly, he thought, and Leppard had seen to it that her ornamentation was historically correct. In sum, the tape was an attractively fresh one that he had very much enjoyed.

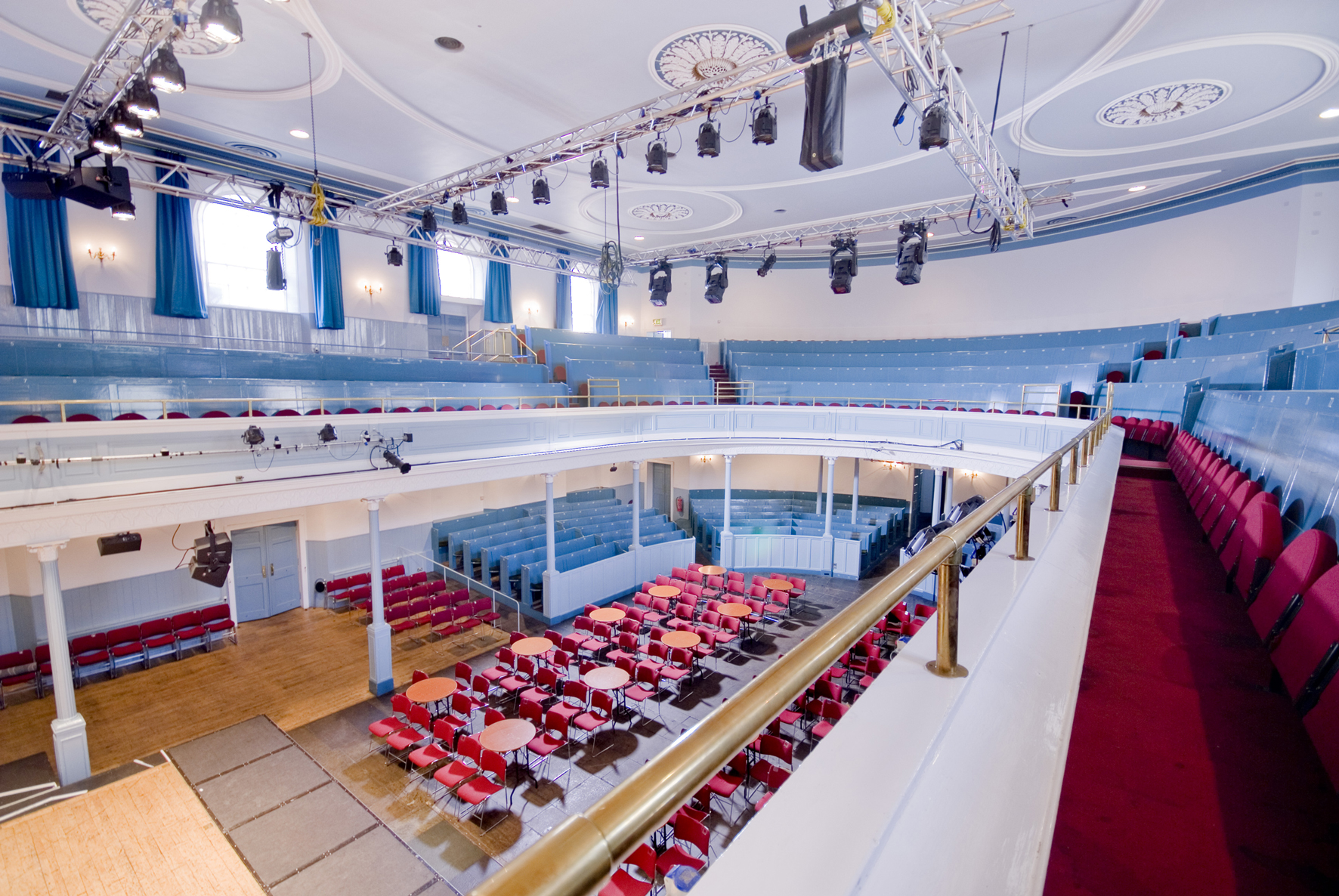
The interior of the Queen's Hall, Edinburgh, formerly the Hope Park Chapel

The audio expert John Borwick reviewed the first version of the album on CD in Gramophone in June 1986. For him, Leppard's realizations were unequivocally beneficial. "The orchestral effects", he wrote, "are of such continuous appeal and inventiveness ... that I am inclined to give the Scottish Chamber Orchestra star billing alongside ... Frederica von Stade". He thought that most listeners would enjoy hearing the album's "mellifluous" anthology of songs and arias performed with textures so rich. The audio quality of the disc, moreover, was beautiful. All von Stade fans, he concluded, would "welcome this feast of her singing in the baroque style of which she is such a master".

== CD track listing ==
=== First version (Erato ECD 88100) ===
Claudio Monteverdi (1567–1643), in realizations by Raymond Leppard

- 1 (5:34) "Ohimè ch'io cado" (1624)
- 2 (6:13) Lamento di Ottavia: "Disprezzata Regina" from L'incoronazione di Poppea
- 3 (8:05) "Et é pur dunque vero" from Scherzi Musicali (1632)
- 4 (4:00) Aria di Ottavia: "A Dio Roma" from L'incoronazione di Poppea

Francesco Cavalli (1602-1676), in realizations by Raymond Leppard

- 5 (5:02) Lamento di Cassandra: "L'alma fiacca svani" from La Didone
- 6 (2:30) "La bellezza è un don fugace" from Il Xerse
- 7 (6:10) Lamento di Clori: "Amor, che ti diè l'ali" from L'Egisto
- 8 (3:10) "Numi ciechi più di me" from L'Orimonte
- 9 (3:29) "Non è, non è crudel" from Scipione affricano
- 10 (3:33) "Ardo, sospiro e piango" from La Calisto

=== Second version (Erato 4509-98504-2): bonus tracks ===
Wolfgang Amadeus Mozart (1756-1791), with a libretto by Lorenzo da Ponte

- 11 (2:03) Aria di Dorabella: "Smanie implacabili" from Così fan tutte
- 12 (3:41) Aria di Dorabella: "È amore un ladroncello" from Così fan tutte

== Personnel ==
=== Musical ===
- Frederica von Stade, mezzo-soprano
- Scottish Chamber Orchestra
- Raymond Leppard (1927–2019), conductor and realizations
- Orchestre Philharmonique de Strasbourg (tracks 11–12, second version)
- Alain Lombard, conductor (tracks 11–12, second version)

=== Other ===
- Michel Garcin, producer
- Yolanta Skura, engineer (first version)
- Pierre Lavoix, engineer (tracks 11–12, second version)
- Françoise Garcin, production assistant
- Ysabelle Van Wersch-Cot, digital mastering engineer

== Release history ==
In 1985, Erato released the first version of the album on LP (catalogue number NUM 75183), cassette (catalogue number MCE 75183) and CD (catalogue number ECD 88100). The LP included sleeve notes by Roger Tellant and an insert with texts but no translations. The CD included a 12-page insert booklet with no texts but with a photograph of Raymond Leppard and with notes by Roger Tellant.

In 1995, Erato released the second version of the album on CD (catalogue number 4509-98504-2) with a 16-page booklet with no texts but with notes by Roger Tellant and Charles Osborne.

== See also ==
- Così fan tutte (Alain Lombard recording)
