= Melanie Diener =

German operatic soprano

- Born: 1967 (age 58–59); Schenefeld, West Germany
- Education: Musikhochschule Stuttgart
- Occupation: Operatic soprano
- Awards: Queen Sonja International Music Competition

Melanie Diener (born in 1967) is a German operatic and concert soprano who appeared at major European opera houses and festivals. She appeared as Elsa in Wagner's Lohengrin at the Bayreuth Festival, among others.

== Career ==
Diener was born in Schenefeld near Hamburg. She grew up in Stuttgart, where she first studied music pedagogy and piano. She then studied voice at the Musikhochschule Stuttgart with Sylvia Geszty, and with Rudolf Piernay in Mannheim.

Diener won prizes at international competitions such as the Internationaler Mozartwettbewerb Salzburg and the Queen Sonja International Music Competition. She made her debut in concert in Mendelssohn's oratorio Paulus in 1995. In 1996, she made her stage debut as Ilia in Mozart's Idomeneo at the Garsington Opera. She appeared in the same role a year later at the Bavarian State Opera. Diener performed the role of Fiordiligi in Mozart's Così fan tutte at the Royal Opera House. In 1997 at the Salzburg Festival, she appeared as the First Lady in Mozart's Die Zauberflöte. She performed the title role of Korngold's Die Kathrin for the BBC that year.

Diener appeared as Donna Elvira in Mozart's Don Giovanni at the Aix-en-Provence Festival in 1998. The same year, she appeared as Agathe in Weber's Der Freischütz at the Vienna State Opera. She made her debut at the Bayreuth Festival as Elsa in Lohengrin in 1999 and performed the role the following two years. In Vienna, she also appeared as Elettra in Mozart's Idomeneo in 2000, as Contessa Almaviva in his Le nozze di Figaro in 2002, as Ellen Orford in Britten's Peter Grimes in 2005, and as Elvira, Elsa, and Chrysothemis in Elektra by Richard Strauss in 2007. In 2013, she appeared as Isolde in Wagner's Tristan und Isolde with the Canadian Opera Company in Toronto, a role which she also performed at the Opéra national du Rhin in Strasbourg.

In concert, Diener also sang the soprano parts in Beethoven's Missa solemnis, Mendelssohn's Elias, Ein deutsches Requiem by Brahms, Verdi's Requiem, and Britten's War Requiem, among others. In 1998, she appeared in Ermanno Wolf-Ferrari's cantata La vita nuova in Munich on the 50th anniversary of the composer's death.

She also sang lieder, including Wagner's Wesendonck Lieder, and Vier letzte Lieder by Richard Strauss at the Salzburg Festival.
