= Lillian Watson (soprano) =

Lillian Watson (born 4 December 1947 in London) is a soprano whose international career on the concert stage and in the opera house took her to theatres and venues around the UK and throughout Europe; she also made a number of recordings of parts of her repertoire and appeared on film.

== Life and career ==
Watson studied at the Guildhall School of Music and Drama in London and at the London Opera Centre, with private vocal tuition from Vera Rózsa and Jessica Cash, and was spotted by the conductor Raymond Leppard when he came to coach singers in a student production of The Coronation of Poppaea, asking her to join some recordings of Monteverdi madrigals where she sang alongside Heather Harper, Luigi Alva and others.

In 1970 Watson made her formal operatic debut as Cis in Albert Herring at the Wexford Festival while still at the Opera Centre. Watson's debut was as Papagena in The Magic Flute with Welsh National Opera (WNO) in 1971. On 1 December the same year she made her Covent Garden debut, as Barbarina in a new John Copley production of The Marriage of Figaro. Barely out of the London Opera Centre Watson had recorded Barbarina in April of that year for Colin Davis's complete Philips recording. After her first professional engagement in Wexford, in 1970 she joined Welsh National Opera as a junior principal and remained for four years. After her debut there as Papagena opposite Thomas Allen as Papageno, her professional career got underway in Wales for four seasons from 1970 as a contract artist, singing Wanda in The Grand Duchess of Gerolstein, Tebaldo in Don Carlos, Gianetta in The Elixir of Love as well as Despina, Blondchen and Adina. She sang Clairette in La fille de Madame Angot for the annual production of the John Lewis Partnership Music Society in 1972.

She returned regularly to the Royal Opera; in her first 25 years there she made 179 appearances, progressing from roles such as Barbarina, Gianetta, Papagena and the Young Girl in Lulu to Sophie in Der Rosenkavalier (1989), The Cunning Little Vixen (1990 and 1993), the Italian Soprano in Capriccio (1991), Ismene in Mitridate, re di Ponto (as well as covering one performance as Aspasia) and Bella in The Midsummer Marriage (1996). Her biggest challenge was the title role of The Cunning Little Vixen at Covent Garden, first in 1990 under Simon Rattle then in 1993 under Bernard Haitink - as it was both physically challenging and musically difficult - her first Janáček role, which was recorded in the studio conducted by Rattle, in English. In 1990, the Royal Opera production was broadcast. She also sang the second act role of the cabmen's 'mascot' Milli-Fiakermilli in Strauss's Arabella at Covent Garden in 1981, 1986, 1990 and 1996.

Watson appeared for several seasons at the Glyndebourne Opera Festival in Sussex. From 1975 her roles were Despina, Barbarina, Susanna, Blonde, Tytania, Sophie, and Fire in L'enfant et les sortilèges, the last in 1996. Grove states that "she is ideally suited in voice and personality to Mozart's soubrette roles...". She sang Despina many times - on the Glyndebourne Tour in 1975, in a Michael Geliot production for WNO, at Glyndebourne (productions by Peter Hall and Trevor Nunn), and a Covent Garden production. She felt it is "a wonderful acting part because she is almost an interlocutor between the stage and the audience, a wry commentator on her mistresses protestations and on the morals of men, and from that point of view it's a great role to play and you have to have a rapport with the audience". Engaged at a major European house to sing Despina, four days before the opening the conductor and producer fell out and she was asked to substitute Susanna in Le nozze di Figaro. "Susanna's a very long role and it was the Ponnelle production which was very complicated so we were there rehearsing frantically at all hours". She sang Susanna on a Glyndebourne Tour in 1976, in English at English National Opera and in Vienna, Hamburg and several houses in France.

In 1975 she appeared as Susanna at the Glyndebourne Festival, a role she also chose for her debut at the English National Opera in London in 1978. In 1982 she made her first appearance at the Salzburg Festival as Marzelline, and then sang Blonde in Vienna in 1983. Having appeared in a TV production in 1983, Watson joined ENO's 1985 Orpheus in the Underworld at its first cast changes; her "sparkling Eurydice, a captivating portrayal sung with effortless, bright tone right up to the top of her range and delivered with delectable Gallic insouciance"; the critic continued that her "Bacchic solo, a skilful run along the tightrope that separates opera from cabaret, was all that Offenbach is, or should be, about". She appeared in the audio recording of the same production made in 1987. She was engaged at the Théâtre des Champs-Élysées in Paris in 1989 as Strauss's Sophie. In 1993 she portrayed the Fairy Godmother in the first British performance of Cendrillon at the Welsh National Opera in Cardiff.

Watson first sang the Oscar (Un ballo in maschera) with the Netherlands Opera in the late 1970s and then in Lausanne. At the Royal Opera in 1995, she "single-handedly injected living dramatic movement into [Oscar] derived from the skittish personality of Oscar's music". As Pavarotti was the star of the production she was not expecting a positive press, saying "You know that the public is coming for him... I never envisaged getting the press I got. It was very gratifying. I thought. .. Oh gosh, they noticed I was there ... It was probably because I was the only thing moving on stage!". In the same year she appeared in Schoenberg's Von heute auf morgen in Brussels.

Her Proms appearances include Arsena in Der Zigeunerbaron in 1981, the Poulenc Gloria in 1991, a late night Prom in 1995 of Vivaldi and Handel with the Gabrieli Consort, and Britten's Spring Symphony in 2001. In the concert hall and radio she has sung Mahler 4 under Edward Downes in Manchester, and appeared several times in popular programmes Melodies for You and Friday Night Is Music Night, and Bernstein's On the Town, as Miss Ivy Smith, at the Royal Festival Hall in 2000, conducted by Paul Daniel. She appeared as Elida in a rare revival of Spoliansky's 1932 satirical department store musical Send for Mr Plim at the BOC Covent Garden Festival in 2000.

On television she appeared in an abridged version of Rigoletto (1974) in English, André Previn's Christmas Music Night in 1977, Eurydice in Orpheus in the Underworld in 1983, and other televised operas.

With her interest in the dramatic side of opera, she stated that she prefers to have an extensive rehearsal time when everyone is working together, rather than the situation where big stars "come in and walk to the front and do their piece as we had in Ballo". She would have liked to have recorded Oscar and Susanna, but considered that despite her international career, she was not the kind of international name which record companies wanted to have. She was a member of the vocal teaching staff of the Royal Academy of Music, London, where she received an Honorary Membership (Hon RAM) in 2012.

== Discography ==
- Le nozze di Figaro (Barbarina), BBC Symphony Orchestra, BBC Chorus, Colin Davis (Philips 1970)
- Madrigali Libro VIII (ensemble) English Chamber Orchestra, Raymond Leppard (Philips 1971)
- Midsummer Night's Dream (soloist), London Symphony Orchestra, André Previn (EMI 1976)
- Adriana Lecouvreur (Mlle Jouvenot), Philharmonia Orchestra, James Levine (CBS 1977)
- L'elisir d'amore (Gianetta), Orchestra of The Royal Opera House, Covent Garden, John Pritchard (Columbia 1977)
- The Turn of the Screw (Flora) Orchestra of the Royal Opera House, Covent Garden, Colin Davis (Decca 1981)
- Fidelio (Marzelline), Wiener Philharmoniker, Lorin Maazel (Orfeo 1983)
- La rondine (Yvette), Ambrosian Opera Chorus, London Symphony Orchestra, Lorin Maazel (CBS Masterworks, 1983)
- Die Entführung aus dem Serail (Blonde), Mozartorchester des Opernhauses Zürich, Nikolaus Harnoncourt (Teldec 1985)
- Così fan tutte (Despina), London Philharmonic Orchestra, Bernard Haitink (EMI 1986)
- Orphée aux Enfers (in English), (Euridice), English National Opera Chorus and Orchestra, Mark Elder (TER 1987)
- Hoddinott - A Contemplation upon Flowers, op.90, BBC Welsh Symphony Orchestra, Bryden Thomson (Chandos 1989)
- The Cunning Little Vixen (Vixen Sharp-Ears), Chorus and Orchestra of The Royal Opera House, Covent Garden, Simon Rattle (EMI Classics 1991)
- Die Zauberflöte (Papagena), Drottningholm Court Theatre Orchestra & Chorus, Arnold Östman (Decca 1992)
- A Midsummer Night's Dream (Tytania), City of London Sinfonia, Richard Hickox (Virgin Classics 1993)
- Israel in Egypt (soprano) Choir of Christ Church Cathedral, Oxford, English Chamber Orchestra, Simon Preston (Decca 1994)
- Die Kathrin (Chou-Chou), BBC Singers & Concert Orchestra, Martyn Brabbins (cpo 1998)
- Paul Bunyan (Fido), Chorus and Orchestra of the Royal Opera House, Richard Hickox (Chandos 1999)
- The Geisha (O Mimosa San), New London Light Opera Chorus & Orchestra, Ronald Corp (Hyperion 1999)

Videos

- Carmen, (Frasquita), Orchestre National de France and Choeurs de Radio-France, Lorin Maazel (Gaumont/Marcel Dassault/Opera-Film Production Rome, 1984)
- Don Pasquale (Norina) Welsh Philharmonia, National Opera Chorale, Richard Armstrong (Screen Legends, HTV SL 2007 1988)
- Mitridate, re di Ponto, (Ismene) Royal Opera Chorus & The Orchestra of the Royal Opera House, Paul Daniel - Stage Directed by Graham Vick (Opus Arte 1993)
