= Eva Kleinitz =

German opera director (1972–2019)

Eva Kleinitz (16 January 1972 — 30 May 2019) was a German opera director whose productions were seen in the opera houses of Austria, Germany, Belgium and France.

== Life and career ==
Born in Langenhagen in the Hanover Region (Lower Saxony), Kleinitz grew up in Hanover and obtained an internship at the Staatsoper Hannover as a teenager after writing to its director, Hans-Peter Lehmann. After studying singing and theatre, she became assistant director at the opera house in Bregenz, Austria, in 1991. From 1998 to 2006, she was successively casting director, artistic director and then deputy director of the Bregenzer Festspiele. From 2006 to 2010, she was director of artistic planning at the Théâtre Royal La Monnaie in Brussels. From 2011 to 2017, she returned to Germany as Deputy Director of the Staatsoper Stuttgart. At the same time, from October 2013, she chaired the Opera Europa network, which brings together the major European opera houses, the first woman in this position (which has been held by personalities such as Bernard Foccroulle and Peter de Caluwe).

In 2016, she was appointed to succeed Marc Clémeur as director of the Opéra national du Rhin in Strasbourg from September 2017.

She died in Strasbourg on May 30, 2019 after a long illness.
