= Paul Bastide =

Breton composer

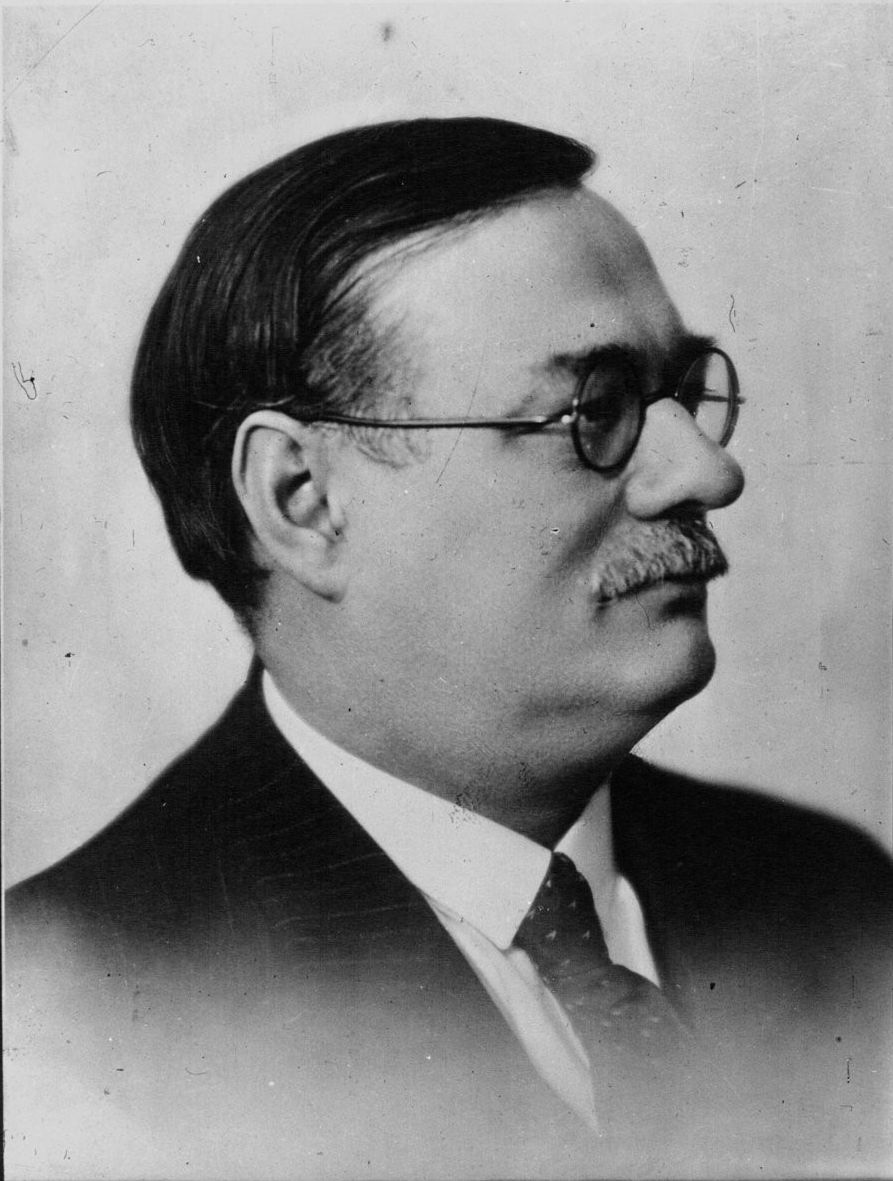
Paul Bastide, new conductor of the Opéra Comique: [press photo] / Carabin

Paul Adrien Bastide (6 April 1879 – 18 August 1962) was a French conductor and composer.

== Career ==
Paul Bastide was born at Quimper and studied at the University of Aix-en-Provence and the Paris Conservatoire (with Pessard and Massenet), winning a first prize in harmony. His first professional work was as chorus master in Marseille from 1898, and gained early conducting experience also in Cairo and the Hague. He also conducted the premiere of the three-act version of Les Armaillis by Gustave Doret at the Grand Théâtre in Geneva in 1913.

From 1919–38 Bastide was the musical director of the opera house in Strasbourg, conducting Samson et Dalila at the reopening on 8 March 1919 after the German occupation of Alsace. He returned again after the Second World War, from 1945–48, reopening with Carmen on 16 November 1945 and conducting notable productions of Béatrice et Bénédict, and Martine by Henri Rabaud (premiere). From 1945 to 1950 he was also music director of the Strasbourg Philharmonic Orchestra.

Bastide was music director at Vichy from the 1920s, and at the Opéra de Marseille from 1941–45.

Bastide was Director of Music at the Opéra-Comique in Paris from 1932–36, making his debut with Carmen. Premieres there conducted by him included Tout Ank Amon (1934) and Gargantua (1935), and the French premiere of Frasquita (1933). He supervised the centennial revival of Le Pré aux clercs (1932) and new productions of Tarass Boulba, Don Quichotte (with Chaliapin) and The Marriage of Figaro. He returned to the Salle Favart as head of music studies from 1948-52. He conducted Louise in some performances of the 50th anniversary run in 1950 at the Opéra-Comique, and the following year in Marseille. At the Opéra he conducted la Flûte enchantée in 1949 and Pénélope in 1951.

Bastide became a Chevalier of the Légion d'honneur in 1928. He died in Paris.

== Compositions ==
Several operas by Bastide were staged in France: Idylle à l'Etoile (Marseille, 11 January 1899), L'Amour magicien (opéra-comique in one act, words and music by Bastide, premiered in Toulouse February 1903), Médée (The Hague, 1911), Le Gentil Bernard (Vichy, 22 July 1919), Monsieur de Pourceaugnac (opéra-bouffe in three acts, words by Pajol after Molière, premiere Strasbourg 5 February 1921), La Vannina (Rouen, 29 January 1926), Oedipe-Roi de Sophocle (Rouen, 21 February 1936), La Divine épopée (poème lyrique in five acts, premiere at the Opéra de Marseille on 25 March 1943), and Jeanne d’Arc (1949).
