= Die Kathrin =

1939 opera by Erich Wolfgang Korngold

- Opera by Erich Wolfgang Korngold
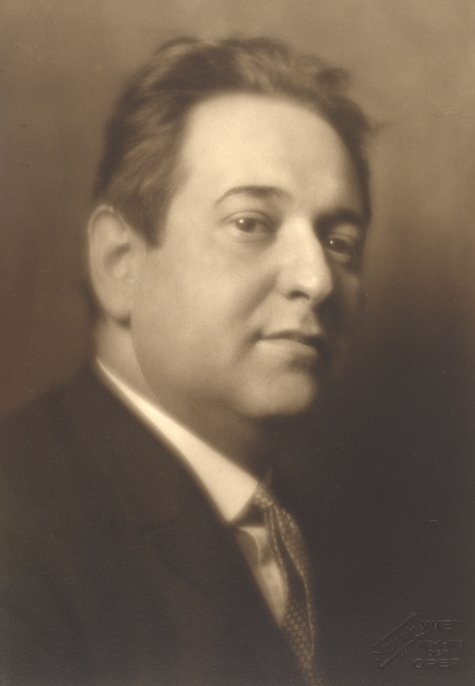
- Korngold c. 1927
- Librettist: Ernst Décsey
- Language: German
- Premiere: 7 October 1939; Royal Swedish Opera, Stockholm, Sweden

Die Kathrin, Op. 28, is a folk opera in three acts by Erich Wolfgang Korngold with a German libretto by Ernst Décsey. Die Kathrin was Korngold's final opera, and he began composition in 1933, while in the midst of re-orchestrating operettas by Johann Strauss Jr. and Leo Fall. Korngold completed the opera during the summer of 1937.

== Performance history and reception ==
The premiere was set for March 1938 in Vienna, but was cancelled less than a month after the Nazi Invasion of Austria.

The original plot was the love story between a German woman and a Belgian soldier in the occupied Rhineland, which would not be acceptable to Nazi censors. In anticipation, Korngold's wife, Luzi, made modifications to the original libretto. The main protagonist, Kathrin, was now Swiss instead of German. Unfortunately, these changes did not placate the Nazi censors. Despite the change in plot, the grounds of the cancellation had to do with Korngold's Jewish heritage, as the Reich Chamber of Culture declared that any art by a Jewish person or of Jewish subject matter "degenerate."

The opera was almost lost when Korngold's home was invaded by Nazis with attempt to destroy the work. The employees of Josef Weinberger Publishing managed to recover enough of the opera, sending it to Korngold interspersed between the works of Beethoven and Mozart – acceptable composers.

After having been travelling back and forth to America for a few years, Korngold saw this as his last straw and moved with his family to Hollywood. He vowed not to write another concert work until after Hitler was removed from power.

It finally premiered at the Royal Swedish Opera in neutral Stockholm, Sweden, on 7 October 1939, conducted by Fritz Busch.

A Vienna premiere with only eight performances in October 1950 met harsh reviews, the opera's richly melodic musical language being completely at odds with the austere post-war taste. It was declared "not modern enough" and "out-of-date". The reviews highlighted the difference in taste between pre-war and post-war Vienna.

== Synopsis ==
=== Act 1 ===
The time is 1930. The story begins in a small garrison town in the South of France, on a Sunday afternoon in summer. As the curtain rises, young men and girls are going to the cinema, among them a servant girl, Kathrin and her friend Margot. There are also a number of soldiers, including François, who is really a strolling minstrel by profession, and doing his military service. He sings eloquently of his love of singing – and of girls. Kathrin and François meet and fall in love – but late that evening, after Kathrin confesses all to Margot, her friend tells her she will lose her job if her employer finds out about her new romance. Margot urges Kathrin to write François a letter saying she will never see him again. She does so, in one of Korngold's most poignant arias. Kathrin retires for the night only to be awakened by knocking: it is François. He climbs through her window and confesses his true profession — as a singer. An ecstatic love duet follows and the two spend the night together. [In a scene at the Palais Dudevant, where Kathrin works, she faints while serving her employer, thereby revealing her pregnancy. She is sacked.] Some weeks later, François is posted to Algiers with his regiment. As the soldiers and François march away singing a triumphant marching song, she kneels before a statue of the Virgin Mary to pray for the future of her lover – and their child.

=== Act 2 ===
The second act takes place some months later. It is now Winter and snow is falling. At a country inn on the Swiss-French border, the innkeeper is arguing with a vagabond who is trying to sell her a silk dress. Outside, Kathrin comes walking along the country road. She is distressed and on her way to find François. At the inn, Kathrin meets Malignac, an unscrupulous and lascivious nightclub owner from Marseilles, who, giving her a forged passport, promises to take her there, supposedly to find François. But Malignac has other plans!

The second scene is set in Malignac's club – Chez Chou-Chou. By a strange co-incidence François has been employed at the club as a singer and is much desired by Chou-Chou the leading chanteuse, who is trying to teach him how to sing in a more lively way for the customers. She attempts to seduce him in a deliciously evocative cabaret song, accompanied by an on-stage jazz band. Malignac arrives and, waiting for Kathrin alone in his private salon, he declares his unbridled passion and love for her. But he is interrupted by his lover Monique and a heated argument ensues.

She gives Malignac an ultimatum – she wants to become his wife or else! They struggle and he throws her on the floor. As he leaves, she shouts at him that he will pay for his insult with his life. Malignac invites Kathrin into his salon and attempts to kiss her. François walks in on Malignac just as he is holding Kathrin in his arms and threatens to shoot him, but he is taken away Malignac's henchmen. Malignac then attempts to force himself on Kathrin but is shot dead by Monique who has been hiding behind a curtain. She uses François' pistol. Kathrin assumes François has committed murder to save her, while François believes it to be Kathrin's deed – and protesting his "guilt", he goes to jail, thinking he is saving his sweetheart. Kathrin, left alone, sings eloquently of her despair – and then her hope for her child.

== Roles ==
Roles, voice types, premiere cast
Role	Voice type	Premiere cast, 7 October 1939 Conductor: Fritz Busch
Kathrin	soprano	Brita Herzberg
François	tenor	Einar Beyron
Malignac	bass-baritone	Sven d'Ailly
Chou-Chou	soprano	Isa Quensel
Monique	mezzo-soprano	Gertrud Pålson-Wettergren
The Old Baron Dudevant	spoken	
The Baron's Wife	spoken	
Captain Victorian Dudevant	spoken	
The Captain's Wife	spoken	
Pierre	children's role	
Dr. Leroux	spoken	
The Doctor's Wife	spoken	
Margot	soprano	
Raoul	baritone	
Sergeant	bass-baritone	
The Mayor	silent	
A Crier	tenor	
A Young Girl	mezzo-soprano	
A Young Boy	tenor	
Der Direktor	baritone	
Chouchou	soprano	
Friseur	baritone	
Wirtin	mezzo-soprano	
Vagabond	tenor	
Gendarm	bass-baritone	
A Waiter	baritone	
Bübli	children's role	
The Tailor	tenor	
The Servant	bass	
The Maid	spoken	

== Orchestration ==
The work is scored for 1 piccolo (doubled by 3 flutes), 2 flutes, 2 oboes, 1 english horns, 2 clarinets, 1 bass-clarinet, 2 bassoons, 1 contra-bassoon, 2 alto-saxophones, 1 tenor-saxophone, 4 horns, 3 trumpets in C (1 used occasionally as a jazz trumpet), 3 trombones (1 used occasionally as a jazz trombone), 1 tuba, a string quintet, harp, guitar, celesta, piano, accordion, and percussion. Percussion includes: 3 timpani, glockenspiel, xylophone, vibraphone, triangle, snare drum, wooden block, tambourine, castanets, bell, bass drum, cymbal, tam-tam, a jazz drum kit, and tubular bells. Only the stage, during scenes in a jazz club, there are the following instruments: piano, organ, 1 trumpet, pianino, and a cowbells.

== Recordings ==
- In 1998, CPO released the 1997 world premiere recording, with Martyn Brabbins conducting the BBC Concert Orchestra. Melanie Diener, David Rendall, Robert Hayward, Lillian Watson and Della Jones were in the principal roles.
