= Aziz Shokhakimov =

Uzbek opera and symphonic conductor

- Born: Aziz Shokhakimov; 3 October 1988 (age 36); Tashkent, Uzbekistan

Aziz Shokhakimov (Азиз Шохакимов) is an Uzbek conductor of operas and symphonic music who has been directeur musical et artistique of the Strasbourg Philharmonic Orchestra since 2021, a position that includes duties with the National Opera of the Rhine.

== Education and early career ==
Born in Tashkent on 3 October 1988, Shokhakimov was accepted at age six at the Uspensky Music School for Gifted Children where he studied violin, viola and conducting with Vladimir Neymer. Seven years later, at thirteen, he made his conducting debut with the National Symphony Orchestra of Uzbekistan. His debut as an opera conductor took place in his home city with Uzbekistan's national opera company, at the Navoi Theatre, with Bizet's Carmen. Shokhakimov was appointed resident conductor of the National Symphony Orchestra in 2006.

== Competitions ==
In Bamberg in 2010 he took 2nd prize in the Gustav Mahler Conducting Competition, leading to invitations to work with the Staatskapelle Dresden, the London Philharmonic, the Lucerne Symphony Orchestra and the Orchestra Sinfonica di Milano Giuseppe Verdi. In 2016 Shokhakimov jointly won the Herbert von Karajan Young Conductors' Award, given during the Salzburg Festival.

== Career ==
Between 2015 and 2021 Shokhakimov was Kapellmeister at the Deutsche Oper am Rhein.

His regular work as a guest conductor has extended to the Toronto Symphony Orchestra, the Seattle Symphony Orchestra, the Seoul Philharmonic, the Yomiuri Nippon Symphony Orchestra in Tokyo, the Frankfurt Radio Symphony Orchestra, the Sinfonia Varsovia in Poland, the RAI National Symphony Orchestra in Italy, the Tekfen Philharmonic in Turkey and the Orchestre National de France.

In opera Shokhakimov's career has taken him to the Teatro Comunale di Bologna, to Moscow's Bolshoi Theatre, to the Opera de Paris, to the Komische Oper in Berlin and to the Bavarian State Opera in Munich.

=== Strasbourg Philharmonic Orchestra ===
Shokhakimov's first engagement with the Strasbourg Philharmonic Orchestra came in 2014 in a program of Mahler and Shostakovich. This encounter left a cherished and lasting impression on him; he spoke highly of the orchestra's musicians, describing them as "shining" in their performances. In 2020 the orchestra announced his current appointment for three seasons, effective with the 2021–22 season. This contract was later extended by two seasons, to be effective until 2026. The partnership has led to a recording agreement with Warner Music Group.

== Filmography ==
- Conduct! Every Move Counts!
- Der Taktstock
- O'zbekistonlik

== Personal life ==
Shokhakimov lives in Strasbourg with his wife and two children.
