= Philippe Huttenlocher =

Swiss baritone (born 1942)

Philippe Huttenlocher (born 29 November 1942) is a Swiss baritone.

== Life and career ==
He was born in Neuchâtel, Switzerland. He first studied violin at the conservatory in Neuchâtel, and then voice in Fribourg. In 1972, he won the international singing competition in Bratislava.

He is married to the soprano Danielle Borst.

He has had a long association with the Ensemble Vocal de Lausanne and Michel Corboz. He is known for his interpretations of Bach and Charpentier. He has made many recordings, particularly of sacred music.

Along with Nina Hagen, he sings Lars Von Trier's Europa Aria, at the end of the film Europa (film) (1991).

== Selected recordings ==
- Marc-Antoine Charpentier : Te deum H.146, Beatus vir H.224, "Tenebrae Facta Sunt" H.129, Chœur symphonique et Orchestre de la Fondation Gulbenkian de Lisbonne, conducted by Michel Corboz. LP Erato 1977 report CD 1980
- Marc-Antoine Charpentier : Le Jugement dernier H.401, Beatus vir H.224, Alain Zaepffel, contre-ténor, Chœur symphonique et Orchestre de la Fondation Gulbenkian de Lisbonne, conducted by Michel Corboz. LP Erato 1974 report CD Erato ( H.224 remplacé par H.193) 1980
- Marc-Antoine Charpentier : Messe pour les Trépassés H.2, Prose des morts H.12, Élèvation H.234, Motet pour les Trépassés à 8 H.311, Miserere des Jésuites H.193, Chœur symphonique et Orchestre de la Fondation Gulbenkian de Lisbonne, conducted by Michel Corboz. 2 LP Erato 1973 report CD Erato (sans H 193)
- Marc-Antoine Charpentier, David et Jonathas H.490, Paul Esswood, David, Colette Alliot-Lugaz, Jonathas, Philippe Huttenlocher, Saül, Roger Soyer, Achis, Antoine David, Joabel, René Jacobs, La Pythonisse, Pari Marinov, L'Ombre de Samuel, Maitrise de L'Opéra de Lyon, Enfants de la Cigale, de Lyon, et du lycée musical, English Bach Festival Baroque Orchestra, conducted by Michel Corboz. 2 CD Erato 1981.
- Jean-Joseph Cassanéa de Mondonville, Titon et l'Aurore, Jennifer Smith, Ann Monoyios, Jean-Paul Fouchécourt, Philippe Huttenlocher, Les Musiciens du Louvre, conducted by Marc Minkowski, 1 CD Erato (1992) (OCLC 39039271)
- Marin Marais, Alcione, Tragédie lyrique, Jennifer Smith, Gilles Ragon, Philippe Huttenlocher, Vincent Le Texier, Véronique Gens, Les Musiciens du Louvre, conducted by Marc Minkowski, 3 CD Erato 1990

== See also ==
- Mozart: Così fan tutte (Alain Lombard recording)
