= Palais de la musique et des congrès =

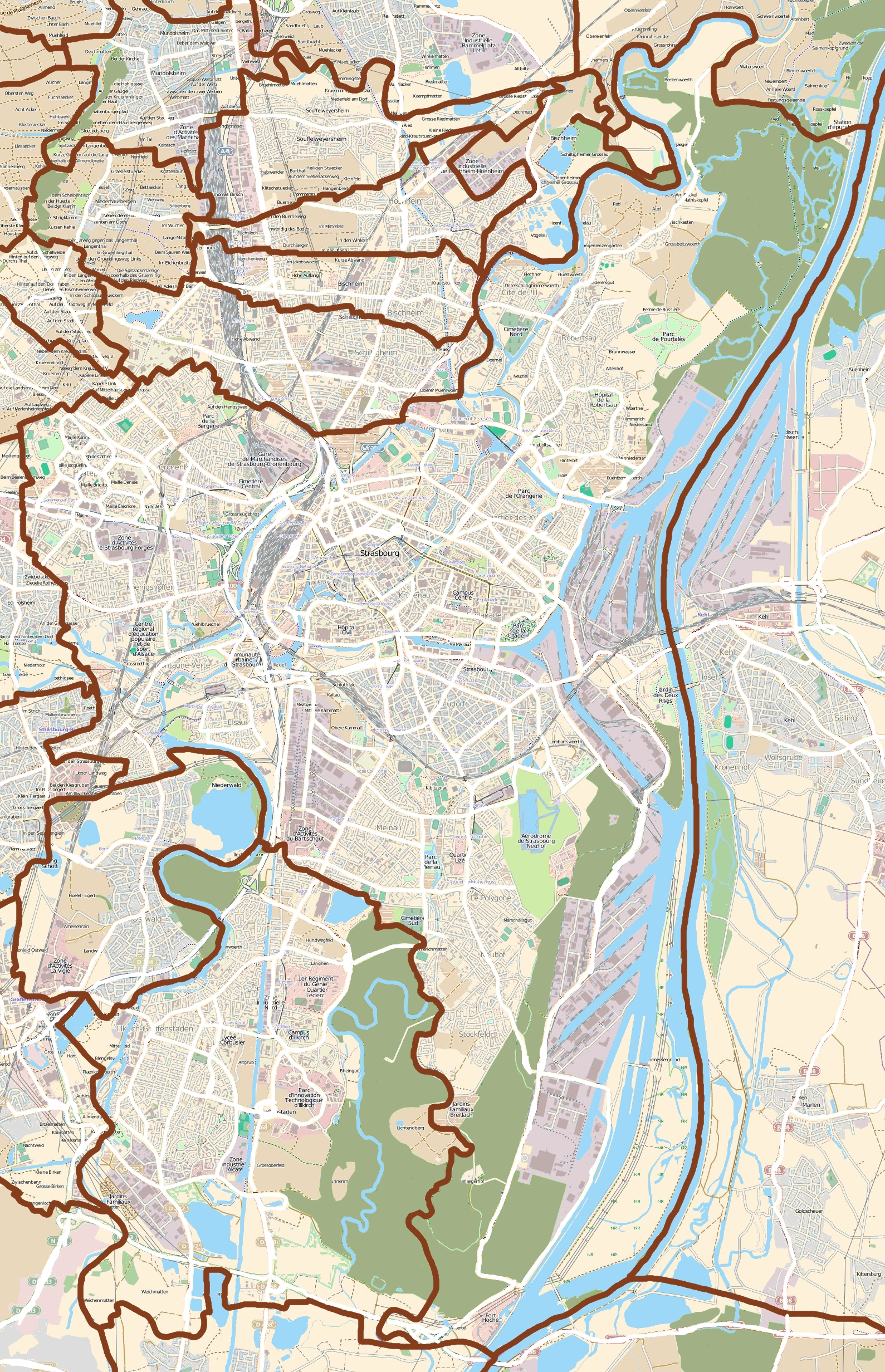
- Location within Strasbourg
- Alternative names: PMC

General information
- Type: Music venue, Convention center
- Architectural style: contemporary
- Location: Strasbourg, France
- Coordinates: 48°35′52″N 7°45′26″E
- Construction started: 1973
- Completed: 1975; 1989; 2015
- Inaugurated: 16 October 1975
- Renovated: 2012–2016

Design and construction
- Architects: Paul Ziegler, François Sauer, André Dahan
- Architecture firm: groupement Rey-Lucquet + associés/Dietrich-Untertrifaller/OTE Ingénierie/Solares Bauern/C2BI/Müller BBM/Walter Kottke; Pertuy Construction

Other information
- Seating capacity: 1,876 (Salle Érasme); 1,182 (Salle Schweitzer); 515 (Salle Cassin); 3,573 (Total)

The Palais de la musique et des congrès (official English name: Strasbourg Convention Centre) is a music venue and convention center in the Wacken district of Strasbourg, France, close to the European quarter. It is home to the orchestra, Orchestre philharmonique de Strasbourg since 1975.

== History ==
In 1962, the historic venue of the philharmonic orchestra, the Palais des Fêtes, was starting to get old. The city also did not have a proper convention center. The mayor, Pierre Pflimlin turned to famed architect, Le Corbusier for a project. Le Corbusier started working on the commission and made drafts and a wooden model but died before he could provide definitive plans. This was the second time Le Corbusier had unsuccessfully tried to build in Strasbourg, after a failed housing project in 1951.

The Palais de la musique et des congrès in its first form was built 1973–1975 in a completely different style and shape than what Le Corbusier had envisioned. The hexagonal and comparatively low building was centered around the city's main auditorium, the 1,870 m^{2} (20,100 sq ft) Salle Érasme (1,876 seats after modernization). In 1989, a first new wing was added to the northwest, including a second auditorium, the 1,265 m^{2} (13,620 sq ft) Salle Schweitzer (1,182 seats after modernization). A third auditorium was opened in the northwest wing in 2016, the Salle Cassin, with 571 m^{2} (6,150 sq ft) and 515 seats, and a new wing to the west of the Salle Érasme housed a 3,000 m^{2} (32,000 sq ft) multifunctional hall.

Between 2012 and 2016, and especially 2013–2015, the Palais was thoroughly renovated and modernized to the designs of the Austrian architectural firm Dietrich/Untertrifaller and French firm Rey-Lucquet & Associés. The 8,000 m^{2} (86,000 sq ft) second new wing was added and the existing spaces were redistributed in order to accommodate more visitors and guests. The surface area of the building now stands at 45,000 m^{2} (480,000 sq ft). As described by the Archello website, the architects "decided to further develop and expand on the existing central motif of equilateral triangles" and "continued the use of the typical hexagon in the new buildings." "They also created a completely new silhouette with the new buildings and stainless steel arcades." "An almost kilometer-long arcade wraps around and encloses the entire building complex, giving it a distinct profile. The fifteen-meter high and six-ton steel columns covered in angularly folded stainless steel sheets form an attractive, dynamic outer shell with their twisting rhythms." "In December 2016, the recently completed project was nominated for the European Prize for Contemporary Architecture – Mies van der Rohe Award 2017."

The Palais de la musique et des congrès is home to over 300 different events each year (concerts included).

== See also ==
- Strasbourg Opera House
