= Opéra national du Rhin =

French opera company

Coordinates: 48.5858°N 7.7521°E

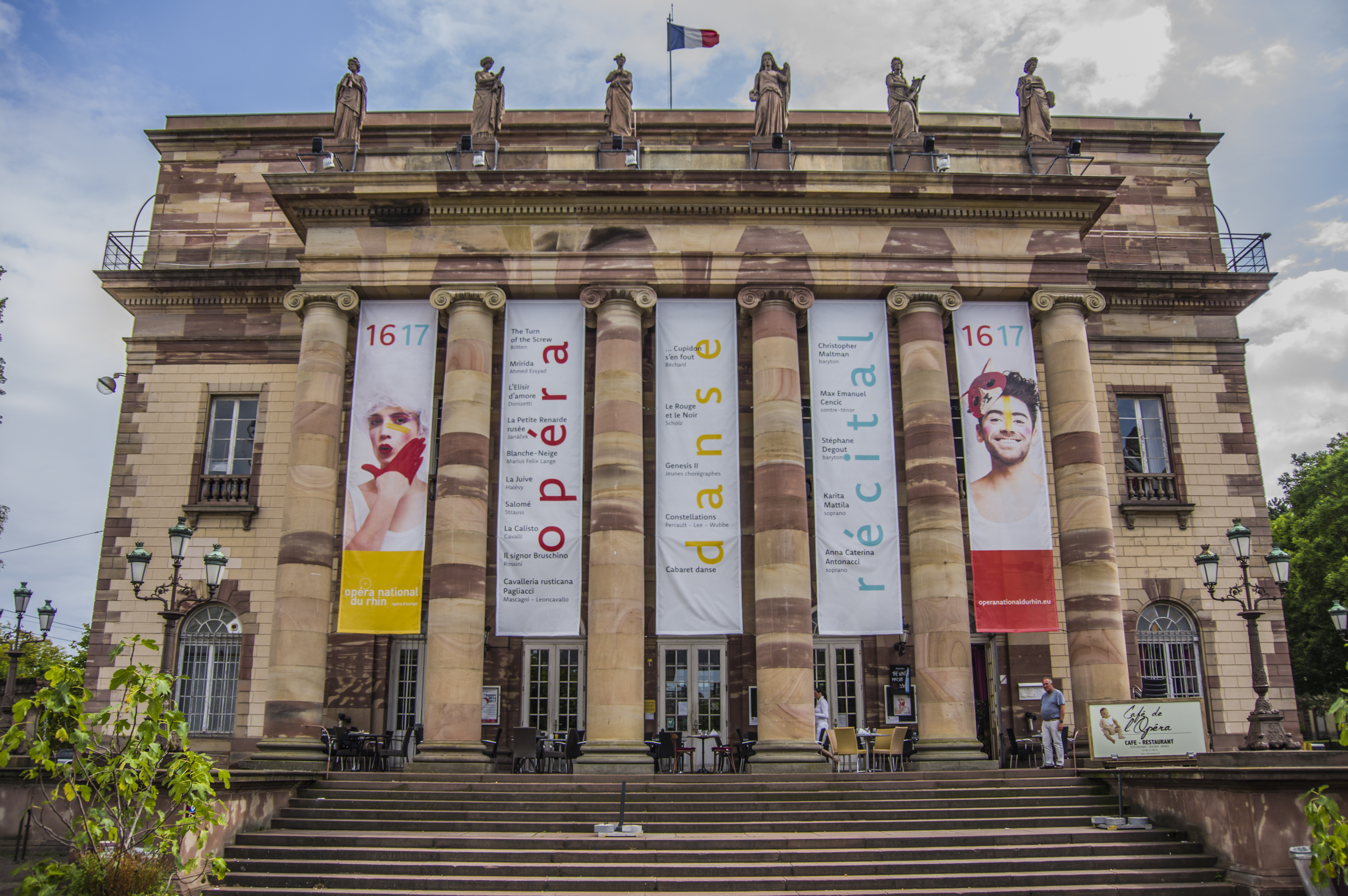
The facade of the Strasbourg Opera House

The Opéra national du Rhin is an opera company which performs in Alsace, eastern France. It includes the Opéras in Strasbourg, in Mulhouse, where the Ballet de l'Opéra national du Rhin, also known as the Ballet Du Rhin, is based, and in Colmar, with its Opéra Studio, a training centre for young singers. Thee organisation has held the status of "national opera" since 1997.

The Orchestre philharmonique de Strasbourg and the Orchestre symphonique de Mulhouse are the usual orchestras of this institution.

== History ==
The first opera house opened in Strasbourg in 1701 in a converted granary. After a fire and temporary locations, a new Théâtre municipal opened in the Place Broglie in 1821. This building was virtually gutted during the German bombardment of 1870, but it was rebuilt in identical style, re-opening in 1873. In early 2023 the mayor of Strasbourg announced that the Théâtre municipal would close from 2026 to 2029 for "complete reconstruction".

During the German era up to 1919, several eminent conductors held posts at the Strasbourg opera: Hans Pfitzner (1910–19), Wilhelm Furtwängler (1910–11), Otto Klemperer (1914–17) and George Szell (1917–1919). From 1919–38 Paul Bastide was musical director; he returned after the Second World War with notable stagings of Béatrice et Bénédict (first French staging), and Martine by Rabaud (premiere).

From 1948–53, under Roger Lalande, the theatre saw the first French productions of Peter Grimes (1949), Mathis der Maler (1951), and The Rake's Progress (1952). The spirit of innovation continued under Frédéric Adam, director from 1955–72 – a Ring with Birgit Nilsson and French premieres of Il prigioniero, Oedipus rex, Jenůfa, Die Frau ohne Schatten and Dalibor; there was also a production of Les Troyens.

The merger to form the Opéra du Rhin took place in 1972 under the conductor Alain Lombard, with the Orchestre philharmonique de Strasbourg and the Orchestre symphonique de Mulhouse being the performance orchestras in those locations. In the early years, Lombard attempted to revive the repertoire, as well as attract big names such as Birgit Nilsson, Montserrat Caballé, José Carreras, Régine Crespin, and Mirella Freni.

Since 1985 the Ballet de l'Opéra national du Rhin, or Ballet Du Rhin for short, a national centre for choreography has been based at the Mulhouse Opera.

It has held the status of "national opera" since 1997.

The Opéra Studio, a training centre for young singers, is based at Colmar.

== Management ==
At the end of the 1970s Lombard was succeeded by René Terrasson, a former singer and architect, who also produced some works himself. Since that time, directors have included Laurent Spielmann (1991–1997), Rudolf Berger (1997–2003), and Nicholas Snowman (2003–2009). Since 2020, the director has been Alain Perroux, taking over from the suddenly deceased Eva Kleinitz.

- 1972–1974: Pierre Barrat
- 1974–1980: Alain Lombard
- 1980–1991: René Terrasson
- 1991–1997: Laurent Spielmann
- 1997–2003: Rudolf Berger
- 2003–2009: Nicholas Snowman
- 2009–2017: Marc Clémeur
- 2017–2019: Eva Kleinitz
- 2020– : Alain Perroux

== See also ==
- List of opera houses
