= Orchestre philharmonique de Strasbourg =

French orchestra

Orchestre philharmonique de Strasbourg (OPS)
- Orchestra
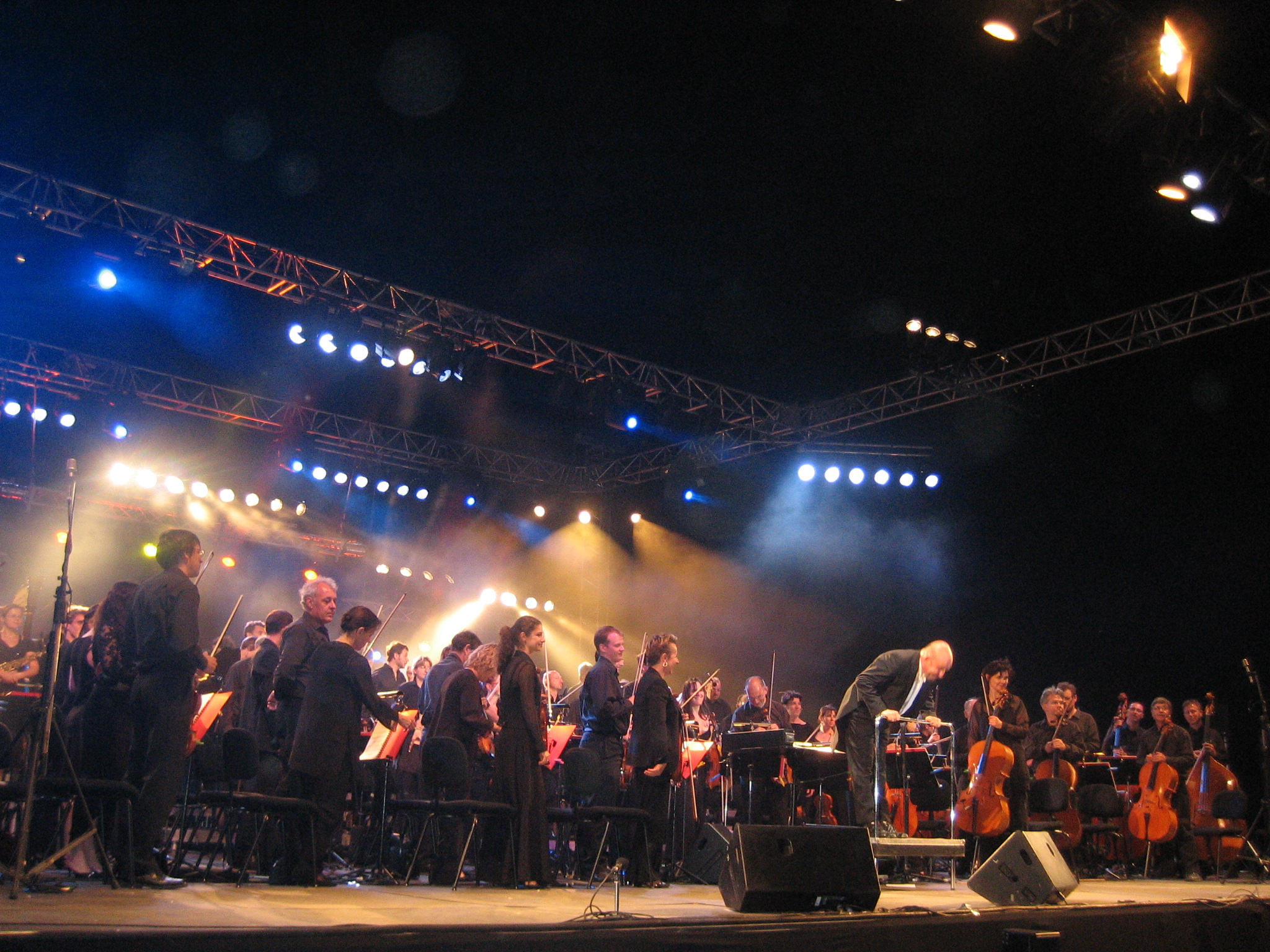
- Founded: 1855
- Concert hall: Palais de la musique et des congrès 'Pierre Pflimlin'
- Principal conductor: Aziz Shokhakimov
- Website: philharmonique.strasbourg.eu

The Orchestre philharmonique de Strasbourg (Strasbourg Philharmonic Orchestra) is a French orchestra based in Strasbourg. It is one of the two permanent orchestras of the Opéra national du Rhin (the other being the Orchestre symphonique de Mulhouse). The orchestra's current principal venue is the Palais de la musique et des congrès 'Pierre Pflimlin' (PMC Pierre-Pflimlin, or PMC).

== History ==
The orchestra was founded in 1855. Between 1871 and 1918, and 1940 and 1944, the orchestra had been a German one, resulting from conflicts between France and Germany over the Alsace region. In 1994, the orchestra acquired the official title of Orchestre philharmonique de Strasbourg – orchestre national. Composers-in-residence have included the French composers Jean-Louis Agobet and Philippe Manoury, the Finnish composer Kaija Saariaho, the American composer John Corigliano, and the Greek composer Georges Aperghis.

Past music directors and chief conductors have included Hans Pfitzner, Hans Rosbaud, Ernest Bour, Jan Latham-Koenig, Charles Bruck and Alain Lombard. Marc Albrecht became artistic advisor of the orchestra in 2005, and music director in 2008. Albrecht and the orchestra have recorded commercially for PENTATONE, including orchestral lieder of Alban Berg, and piano concertos by Robert Schumann and Antonín Dvořák. Albrecht concluded his tenure in 2011. Marko Letonja served as the orchestra's next music director, from 2012 to 2021.

In July 2020, the orchestra announced the appointment of Aziz Shokhakimov as its next music director, effective with the 2021-2022 season, with an initial contract of 3 seasons. In November 2022, the orchestra announced the extension of Shokhakimov's contract as its music director through 2026.

== Music directors ==
- Josef Hasselmans (1855–1871)
- Franz Stockhausen (1871–1907)
- Hans Pfitzner (1907–1915)
- Otto Klemperer (1915–1918)
- Hans Pfitzner (1918–1919)
- Guy Ropartz (1919–1929)
- Paul Paray (1929–1940)
- Hans Rosbaud (1940–1945)
- Paul Bastide (1945–1950)
- Ernest Bour (1950–1964)
- Alceo Galliera (1964–1971)
- Alain Lombard (1971–1983)
- Theodor Guschlbauer (1983–1997)
- Jan Latham Koenig (1997–2003)
- Marc Albrecht (2008–2011)
- Marko Letonja (2012–2021)
- Aziz Shokhakimov (2021–present)
