= Nuits d'été & La damoiselle élue =

- CBS Masterworks CD, MK 39098

Studio album by Frederica von Stade
- Released: 1984
- Studio: Symphony Hall, Boston
- Genre: Classical vocal
- Length: 51:51
- Language: French
- Label: CBS Masterworks
- Producer: David Mottley

Nuits d'été & La damoiselle élue is a 51-minute studio album of songs by Hector Berlioz and a cantata by Claude Debussy performed by Frederica von Stade, Susanne Mentzer, the Tanglewood Festival Chorus and the Boston Symphony Orchestra under the direction of Seiji Ozawa. It was released in 1984.

== Background ==
The album was a sequel to Shéhérazade, a 1981 recording on which von Stade, Doriot Anthony Dwyer, Jules Eskind, Martin Katz, the Boston Symphony Orchestra and Ozawa performed songs by Maurice Ravel: Deux mélodies hébraïques, Chansons madécasses and two of the Cinq mélodies populaires grecques in addition to Shéhérazade itself.

== Recording ==
The album was recorded digitally in the Symphony Hall, Boston. Berlioz's Les nuits d'été was recorded on 17 October 1983, following a live performance of the work in Symphony Hall on 15 October 1983. Debussy's La damoiselle élue was recorded on 10 October 1983, following live performances of the work in Symphony Hall on 7 and 8 October 1983. The engineers used a Soundstream system and a Sony PCM 1610 system. The album was mastered using CBS's DisComputer system at the CBS Studios, New York City.

== Cover art ==
The cover of the album was designed by Christopher Austopchuk, and features a photograph of von Stade taken by John Gotman.

== Critical reception ==
=== Reviews ===
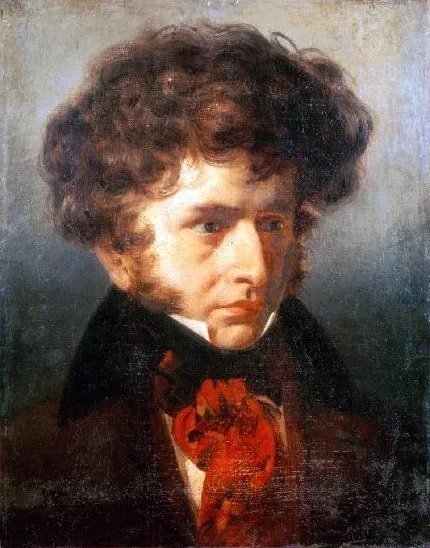
Hector Berlioz in 1832

John Warrack reviewed the album on LP in Gramophone in February 1985, comparing Frederica von Stade's Les nuits d'été with performances by Janet Baker, Régine Crespin and Jessye Norman, and her La damoiselle élue with performances by Ileana Cotrubas and Barbara Hendricks. Von Stade, he wrote, sounded slightly uncomfortable on her new recording. She was a distinguished artist, and she had the intellect and perspicacity to appreciate the diversity of the music that she was presenting. But her programme had confronted her with problems that she had been unable to solve satisfactorily.

In Les nuits d'été, "Villanelle" was "a trifle hasty", and this was attributable to von Stade, not to Seiji Ozawa's brisk tempo. Other singers had followed a similar metronome marking without sounding as hurried as she did. She was better in "Le spectre de la rose", "with the exquisite vocal lines beautifully described". In "Absence", though, "the repeated cries of 'Reviens, reviens' [were] nicely judged but [lacked] the painful ecstasy of loss that the greatest interpreters gave them". Her performances were not helped by her inability to sing all the songs in the keys that Berlioz had stipulated. "Villanelle" was lowered from F to A, robbing the vocal line of some of its radiance and making the woodwinds and other instruments in Ozawa's "smooth and detached" orchestra sound less joyous than they should have done. "Au cimetière", likewise, was lowered from D to B flat, while "Le spectre de la rose" was transposed upwards from B to C. One did not need perfect pitch to notice how these alterations had introduced a degree of awkwardness into the transitions from one song to the next.

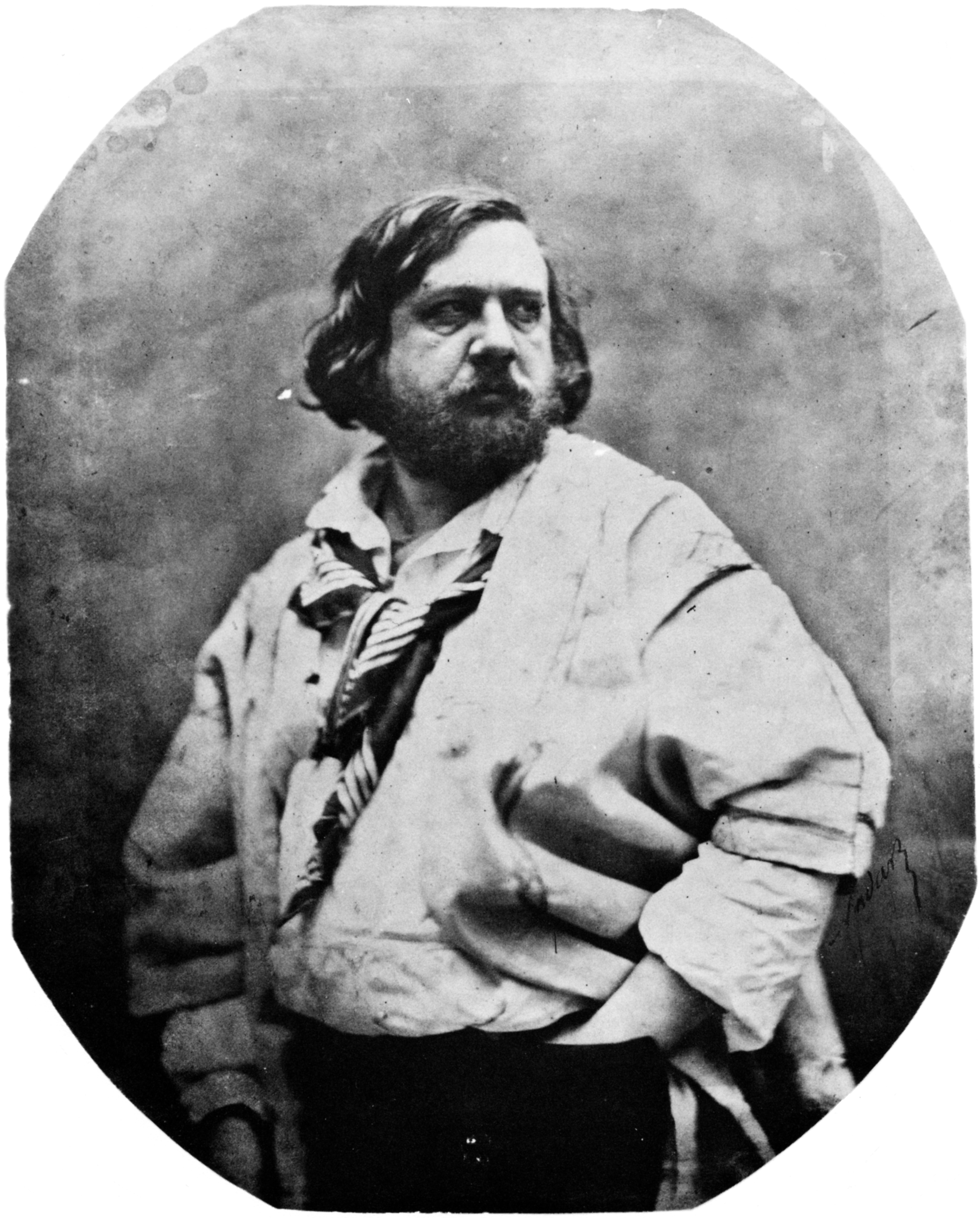
Théophile Gautier photographed by Félix Nadar in 1856

The album's performance of La damoiselle élue was "rather plain [and] unevocative", with "conscientious singing of the part for the so-called 'récitante' by Suzanne Mentzer". French and other francophone listeners would cringe at the Tanglewood Festival Chorus's failure to pronounce their words immaculately. Like von Stade and Mentzer, they sometimes slipped up when they came to final "e", adding an inappropriate accent to turn "je" into "jé" or "me" into "mé". This was not a trivial failing in a performance of music by a composer who cared as deeply about language as Debussy did.

Collectors seeking the best version of Les nuits d'été should turn to either Baker, Crespin or Norman. As for La damoiselle élue, readers might care to note the reference discs' different couplings. Cotrubas's had Debussy's L'enfant prodigue performed by Norman, José Carreras and Dietrich Fischer-Dieskau, while Hendricks's had various shorter Debussy items including Fischer-Dieskau singing Trois ballades de François Villon.

J. B. Steane reviewed the album in Gramophone in April 1985. Listening to Frederica von Stade's Les nuits d'été, he wrote, his soul was moved in a way that it had not been when he had heard the cycle performed by Hildegard Behrens or Suzanne Danco. "The sadness of 'Absence' colours the tone most eloquently, and 'Au cimetière' has a particularly haunting quality." In La damoiselle élue, Barbara Hendricks had looked forward to her reunion with her lover with a "childlike sense of anticipation"; von Stade, "more private and vulnerable, expresses a deeper, more tender longing". Von Stade's record was a "very fine" one.

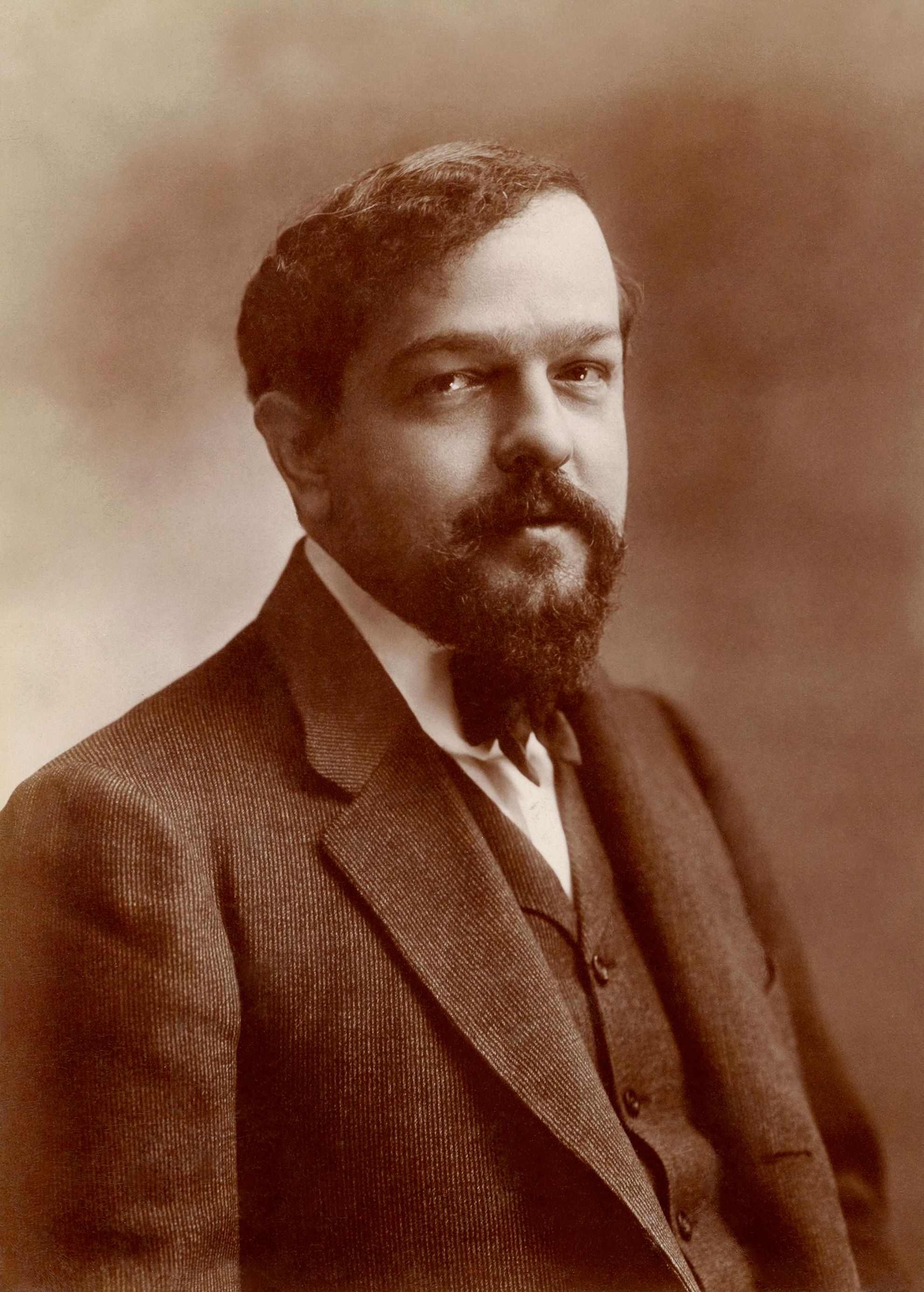
Claude Debussy photographed by Atelier Nadar, c. 1900

Robert Ackart reviewed the album on LP in Stereo Review in May 1985. Frederica von Stade. he wrote, was an artist who prepared her performances with care and presented them with style and precision, and her latest album had been made with her craftsmanship. "Her French is impeccable, her intonation excellent, her vocal delivery at all times free and pure." In Les nuits d'été, she was eloquent in the cycle's two most familiar songs, "Le spectre de la rose" and "Absence", singing both with "beautiful control and sense of line". Her version of the cycle's only cheerful item, "Villanelle", "brims over with lighthearted joy". And her readings of "Au cimetière" and "Sur les lagunes" showed a deep understanding of the overcast, inward-looking mood of their poetry.

A miniature drama about a dead young woman in heaven waiting for her beloved to join her, La damoiselle élue was a piece that could sometimes lapse into "a mawkish sweet-sadness". Von Stade avoided this trap in a performance that shone a bright light on the dualities of Rossetti's vision, with its mixture of eroticism and purity, craving and holiness, hope and acquiescence, the sublunar and the celestial. Suzanne Mentzer, the Boston Symphony Orchestra and Seiji Ozawa all supported their colleague ably.

John Steane revisited the album in Gramophone in January 1988, reviewing a compilation disc that combined von Stade's Les nuits d'été and La damoiselle élue with her earlier recording of Ravel's Shéhérazade. Von Stade had become especially dear to him, he wrote, "because she brought to everything, but especially the French repertoire, a personal touch which was partly a matter of timbre, partly of style, partly a fusion of both, evoking a kind of affectionate sadness". "Absence" exemplified his point perfectly, and all six of von Stade's Les nuits d'été were beautiful. It had to be conceded that some particularly loud or high notes reminded one that she was no longer a youngster, and her voice lacked the power needed to do full justice to Berlioz's climaxes. But her singing was "fine in coloration (dark as the lagoon, white as the tombstone in the Berlioz)", and fine "in sensitivity to mood (the mystical yearning, visionary brightness and serene faith of the Blessed Damozel)". The Boston Symphony allowed us to appreciate all the details of Berlioz's and Debussy's sublime orchestrations, and CBS's mixing engineers had done their balancing perfectly.

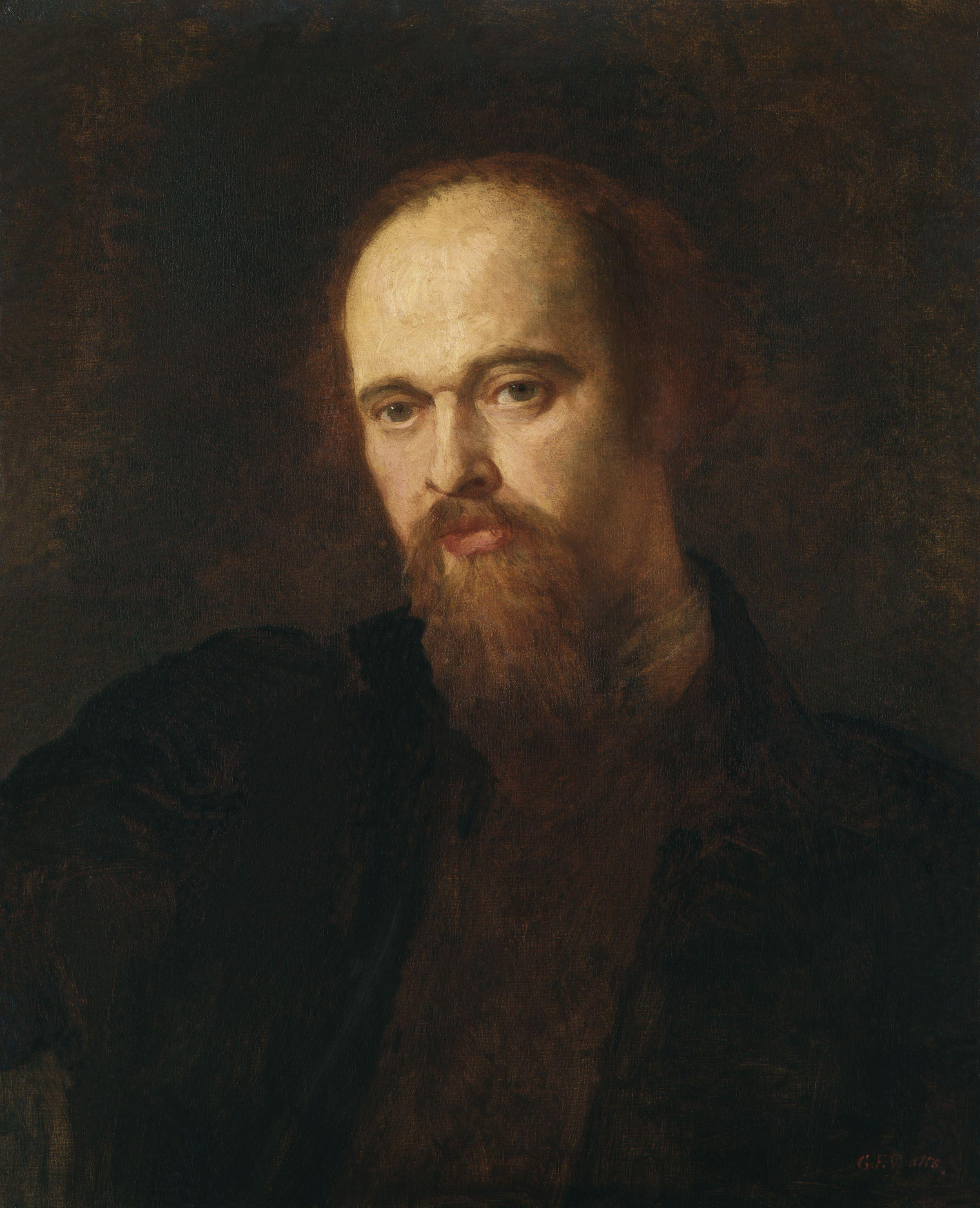
Dante Gabriel Rossetti painted by George Frederic Watts in circa 1871

Lionel Salter reviewed the album on CD in Gramophone in May 1998. Frederica von Stade's vowels were inaccurate, he thought, and he did not agree with her tempos. "Le spectre de la rose" proceeded at a crawl, and so did "Sur les lagunes" until a moment (at "La colombe oubliée") when von Stade suddenly put her foot on the accelerator without Berlioz's permission. Her technical skill allowed her to sustain an adagio pacing without running out of oxygen, but the result seemed unnatural. Moreover, her "Au cimetière" sounded less gripping than it should, and her "Absence" was deficient in both suffering and in desire.

John Warrack returned to the album in Gramophone in February 2004, in a survey of the entire Les nuits d'été discography. It was inevitable, he thought, that even some singers as astute and alert as Frederica von Stade should struggle with the challenges of songs as elusive as those of Berlioz's cycle. She phrased her "Le spectre de la rose" beautifully, but sounded uncomfortable otherwise. Her "Villanelle" was "hasty rather than lively", and her "Absence" "lacks the sense of pain that others have found".

David Shengold mentioned the album in Opera News in December 2016 in the course of a review of a box set of von Stade's recordings in which it had been included. Her version of Les nuits d'été was valuable, he wrote, "For documenting von Stade's always individual and classy [take] on the material without necessarily being the best ... out there". She had delivered a "likeable performance of musical and linguistic sensitivity, best in the slow, contemplative stretches such as 'Absence'."

Alan Blyth provided a detailed comparison of von Stade's Les nuits d'été with other performances of the cycle in his book Song on Record.

=== Accolade ===
In the year after its release, the album was nominated for a Grammy award for the best classical solo vocal performance of 1985.

== CD track listing ==
Hector Berlioz (1803–1869)

Les nuits d'été, Op. 7 ("Summer nights", 1841–1856, texts by Théophile Gautier)

- 1 (2:13) "Villanelle"
- 2 (7:21) "Le spectre de la rose"
- 3 (7:06) "Sur les lagunes (Lamento)"
- 4 (5:48) "Absence"
- 5 (5:56) "Au cimetière (Clair de lune)"
- 6 (3:55) "L'île inconnue"

Claude Debussy (1862–1918)

La damoiselle élue ("The blessed damozel", 1893, text after Dante Gabriel Rossetti, translated by Gabriel Sarrazin)

- 7 (19:25) "La damoiselle élue"

== Personnel ==
=== Musical ===
- Frederica von Stade, mezzo-soprano
- Susanne Mentzer, mezzo-soprano (in La damoiselle élue)
- Tanglewood Festival Chorus (in La damoiselle élue)
- John Oliver, chorus master (in La damoiselle élue)
- Boston Symphony Orchestra
- Seiji Ozawa, conductor

=== Other ===
- David Mottley, producer
- Jack Renner, engineer
- Martha de Francisco, Soundstream editor

== Release history ==
On 2 November 1984, CBS Masterworks released the album on LP (catalogue number IM 39098) with sleeve notes by Barrymore Laurence Scherer and an insert with texts and translations. The album was also issued on cassette (catalogue numbers IMT 39098 in Britain, MT 39098 in the USA).

Also in 1984, CBS Masterworks issued the album on CD (catalogue number MK 39098), with a 20-page booklet including the same notes, texts and translations as were provided with the LP. In 1987, Sony issued a compilation CD (catalogue number SMK 60031) that supplemented the contents of the album with von Stade's recording of Ravel's Shéhérazade. In 2016, Sony released the album on CD (in a miniature replica of its original LP sleeve) with a 52-page booklet in their 18-CD collection Frederica von Stade: The Complete Columbia Recital Albums (catalogue number 88875183412).
