= Shéhérazade (Frederica von Stade recording) =

- Columbia LP, IM 36665

Studio album by Frederica von Stade
- Released: 1981
- Studios: Symphony Hall, Boston and CBS 30th Street Studio, New York City
- Genre: Classical vocal
- Length: 40:04
- Languages: French, Aramaic and Yiddish
- Label: Columbia
- Producer: Paul Walter Myers

Shéhérazade is a 40-minute studio album of art songs by Maurice Ravel performed by Frederica von Stade. In the Chansons madécasses, she is accompanied by the flautist Doriot Anthony Dwyer, the cellist Jules Eskin and the pianist Martin Katz. In two of the Cinq mélodies populaires grecques, the Deux mélodies hébraïques and Shéhérazade itself, she is accompanied by the Boston Symphony Orchestra under the direction of Seiji Ozawa. The album was released in 1981.

== Recording ==
The album was recorded digitally in Symphony Hall, Boston on 8 October 1979 (tracks 1–3) and on 8 April 1980 (tracks 4–7), and in the CBS 30th Street Studio, New York City on 10 November 1979 (tracks 8–10). It was recorded and edited with a Sony system, and mastered with CBS's DisComputer system. The recording of Shéhérazade followed live performances of the cycle that von Stade, the Boston Symphony Orchestra and Ozawa gave in Symphony Hall on 4, 5 and 6 October 1979.

== Cover art ==
The cover of the album was designed by Christopher Austopchuk under the art direction of Henrietta Condak, and features a photograph of von Stade taken by Valérie Clément.

== Critical reception ==
=== Reviews ===
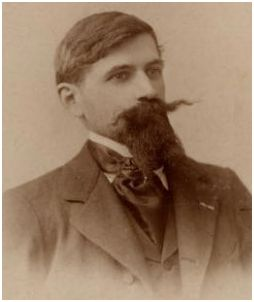
Tristan Klingsor

Alan Blyth reviewed the album on LP in Gramophone in July 1981, comparing von Stade's performance of Chansons madécasses with a version sung by Janet Baker, and comparing her performance of Shéhérazade with versions sung by Baker, Régine Crespin and Jessye Norman.

Shéhérazade, he wrote, was usually sung by a soprano, but, like Baker before her, Frederica von Stade had demonstrated that the cycle could be successfully performed by a mezzo-soprano too. The only point at which the work's tessitura had challenged her was the climax of "Asie", where her tone had blanched at Ravel's taxing high B flat.

Technically, her reading was notable for her prodigious breath control, which allowed her to eschew the breaks of phrase perpetrated by some of her predecessors. Her diction, moreover, was now better than it had been on some of her earlier recordings. Interpretatively, her performance "catches to perfection the languorous, sultry feeling" of both Ravel's music and Tristan Klingsor's poetry.

Conducting, Seiji Ozawa was wise in his choice of tempos, avoiding the "stodgy" pacing that had to some extent compromised Norman's performance of the cycle under Sir Colin Davis.

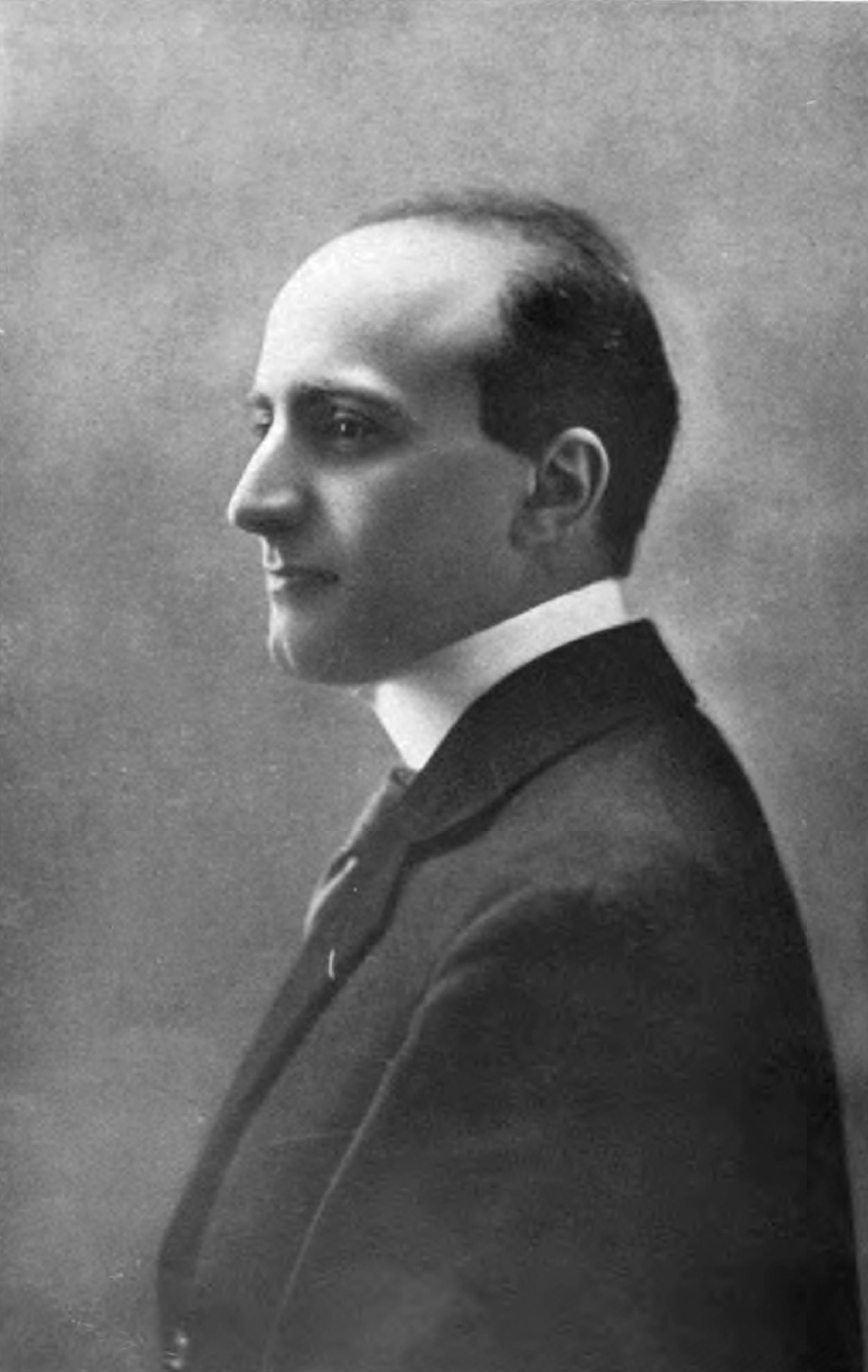
Michel-Dimitri Calvocoressi

Indeed, in "L'indifférent", Ozawa outpaced not just Davis but also Crespin's Ernest Ansermet, but without detracting from the "lazy seductiveness of this glorious song". Crespin's LP had stood at the pinnacle of the Shéhérazade discography for many years, but von Stade's was close to supplanting it.

Baker's, Crespin's and Norman's discs of the cycle had all coupled it with Hector Berlioz's Les nuits d'été. Von Stade had followed an arguably more intelligent path and programmed other music by Ravel instead. She sang his Greek folk melodies with a happy insouciance and his Hebrew songs with an appropriate focused intensity, but her outstanding performances in her filler items were in the Chansons madécasses, "which still have the power to shock even fifty-five years after they were written". Her readings were remarkable for their "accomplishment in mood-painting and word definition". Baker had sung these evocations of Madagascar sensuously, but von Stade had marginally surpassed her, with "a timbre just a little better suited to their earthy voluptuousness".

The playing of the Boston Symphony Orchestra was first class. "Altogether this is a well compiled, imaginatively executed digital disc of some music that should be in every respectable collection".

George Jellinek reviewed the album on LP in Stereo Review in September 1981. It offered more of Ravel's songs than were commonly found on a single disc, he wrote, and there was much about it to like. Its components were balanced meticulously, Frederica von Stade's colleagues played their instruments well and her own performances were characterized by "her musicianship, tonal purity and idiomatic handling of the texts".

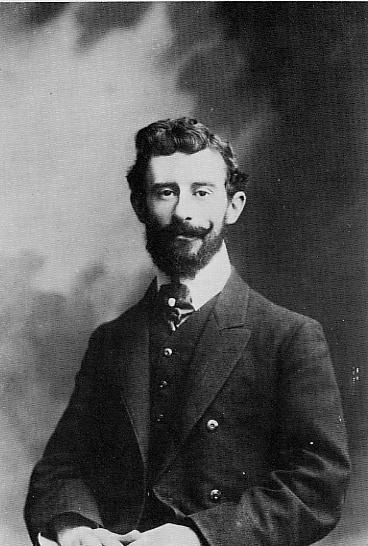
Maurice Ravel, photographed by Pierre Petit in 1906, two years after Shéhérazade was first performed

This said, her interpretations had their disappointments. The timbre of her voice and the volume and feeling of her singing were all insufficiently variegated. Her reading of the Hebrew songs lacked "earthiness", and although she conveyed some of the "primitive elements" in the Chansons madécasses, she failed "to hint at the fierceness in such a song as 'Aoua!'".

It was true that a lot of her singing was so lovely as to verge on the hypnotic. ("Ravel's exquisite sonorities tend to dull the senses".) But she should have offered "more angularity, or, perhaps, more spontaneity". Columbia's audio quality was wonderful.

J. B. Steane reviewed the album in Gramophone in January 1982. In Shéhérazade, he wrote, Jessye Norman's reading had "a more sensuous luxury of gorgeous tone", von Stade's "more tang, more appetite, more liveliness". Von Stade's singing of the Chansons madécasses was beautifully expressive too, "with the evening stillness and relaxation of the last song marvellously well caught".

Steane returned to the album in Gramophone in January 1998, reviewing a compilation CD which coupled von Stade's Shéhérazade with her later recordings of Berlioz's Les nuits d'été and Claude Debussy's La damoiselle élue. He had become fond of von Stade's singing, he wrote, because she "brought to everything, but especially the French repertoire, a personal touch which was partly a matter of timbre, partly of style, partly a fusion of both, evoking a kind of affectionate sadness, exactly the mood for 'L'indifférent'". There was no denying that when she sang a passage that was particularly high or particularly loud, her voice no longer sounded as fresh as it had done in her youth. But for the most part, her Shéhérazade was fine, exemplified in "L'indifférent" by "the caress (an exquisitely gentle portamento) in the 'séduisante' and the forlornly wistful invitation 'Entre'".

Patrick O'Connor reviewed the album in Gramophone in June 2004 in a survey of the Shéhérazade discography. "Von Stade", he wrote, "sounds almost too nice and friendly, like Cherubino embarking on a prank."

David Shengold mentioned the album in Opera News in December 2016 when reviewing a box set of von Stade's Columbia recordings in which it had been included. "The capable all-Ravel recording", he wrote, "... generically led by Ozawa, offers a superb 'Kaddisch'."

=== Accolade ===
The album was nominated for a Grammy award for the best classical solo vocal performance of 1981.

== CD track listing ==
Maurice Ravel (1875–1937)

Shéhérazade (1903), with texts by Tristan Klingsor (1874–1966)

- 1 (9:29) "Asie"
- 2 (2:57) "La flûte enchantée"
- 3 (3:37) "L'indifférent"

Cinq mélodies populaires grecques (1904–1906), with traditional texts translated by Michel-Dimitri Calvocoressi (1877–1944)

- 4 (1:40) No. 1: "Chanson de la mariée"
- 5 (0:58) No. 5: "Tout gai!"

Deux mélodies hébraïques (1914), with traditional texts

- 6 (4:38) "Kaddisch"
- 7 (1:46) "L'énigme éternelle"

Chansons madécasses (1925–1926), with texts by Évariste Desiré de Forges, vicomte de Parny (1753–1814)

- 8 (5:51) "Nahandove, ô belle Nahandove"
- 9 (4:43) "Aoua! Méfiez-vous des blancs"
- 10 (4:16) "Il est doux de se coucher"

== Personnel ==
=== Musical ===
- Frederica von Stade (b. 1945), mezzo-soprano
- Boston Symphony Orchestra, (tracks 1–7)
- Seiji Ozawa (b. 1935), conductor (tracks 1–7)
- Doriot Anthony Dwyer (b. 1922), flute (tracks 8–10)
- Jules Eskin (1931–2016), cello (tracks 8–10)
- Martin Katz (b. 1944), piano (tracks 8–10)

=== Other ===
- Paul Walter Myers (1932–2015), producer
- Budd Graham, engineer
- Martin Greenblatt, engineer
- Milton Cherin, engineer

== Release history ==
In February 1981, Columbia released the album on LP (catalogue numbers M-36665 in Britain, IM-36665 in the US), with sleeve notes by Arbie Orenstein, Alain Feron (in French) and Uwe Kraemer (in German), and an insert with texts and translations. The album was also issued on cassette (catalogue numbers 40-36665 in Britain, HMT-36665 in the US).

Although excerpts from the album were made available on compilation CDs, it was not released in its entirety on CD until 2016, when it appeared (in a miniature replica of its original LP sleeve) with a 52-page booklet in Sony's 18-CD collection Frederica von Stade: The Complete Columbia Recital Albums (catalogue number 88875183412).

== Sequel ==
The album was followed by a second album of French art songs performed by von Stade, the Boston Symphony Orchestra and Seiji Ozawa: Nuits d'été & La damoiselle élue, a 1984 release featuring works by Hector Berlioz and Claude Debussy.
