= Chansons madécasses =

1926 song cycle by Maurice Ravel

- Song cycle by Maurice Ravel
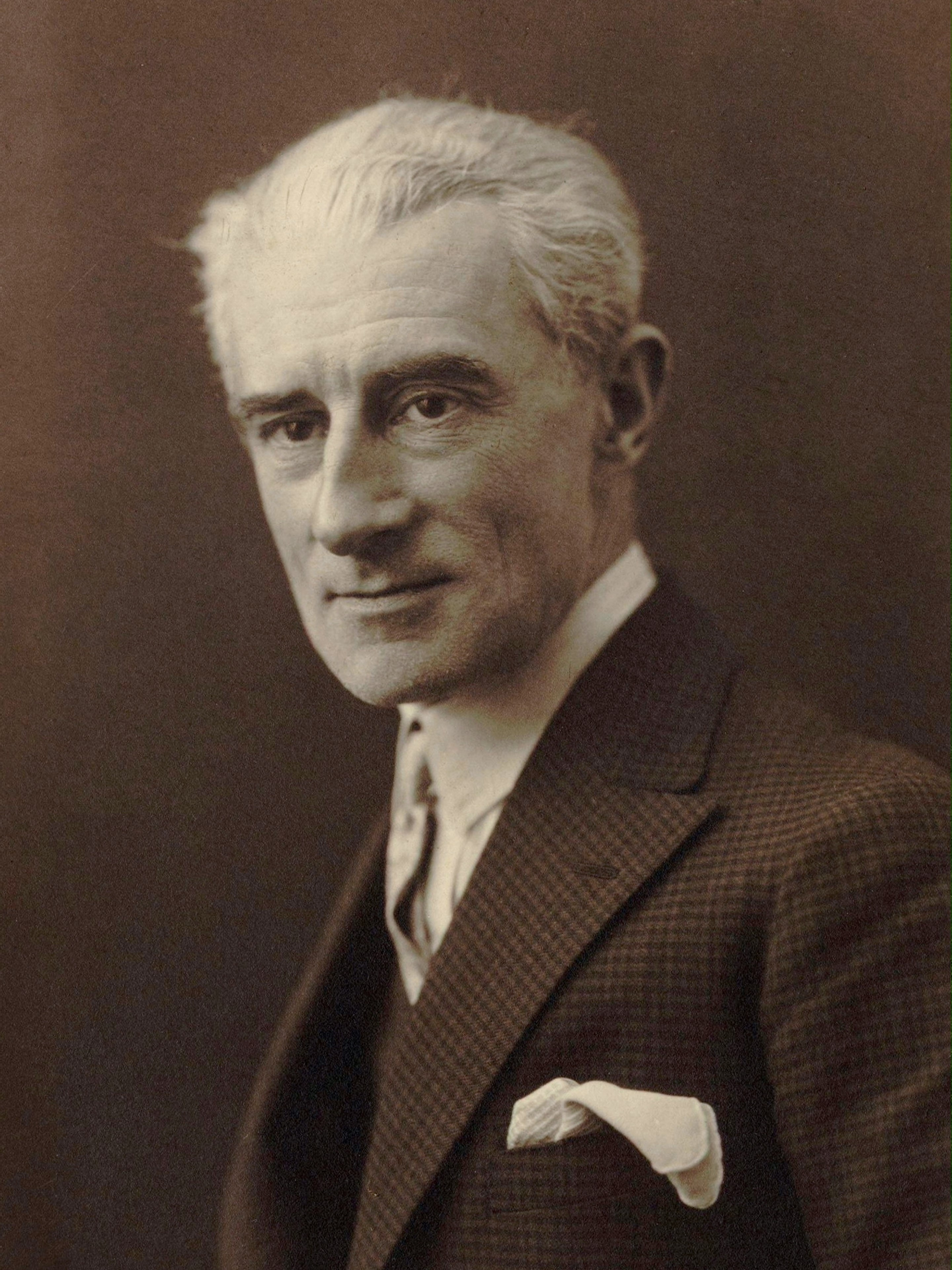
- The composer, c. 1925
- English: Madagascan Songs
- Text: poems Chansons madécasses by Évariste de Parny
- Language: French
- Dedication: Elizabeth Sprague Coolidge
- Performed: 8 May 1926
- Movements: three
- Scoring: voice (mezzo-soprano or baritone); flute; cello; piano

Chansons madécasses (Madagascan Songs) is a set of three exotic art songs by Maurice Ravel written in 1925 and 1926 to words from the poetry collection of the same name by Évariste de Parny.

== Structure ==
Scored for mezzo-soprano or baritone, flute, cello and piano, and dedicated to the American musician and philanthropist Elizabeth Sprague Coolidge, the set is usually performed complete as a true song cycle although this was not the composer's designation. The songs are:

- "Nahandove" (incipit: "Nahandove, ô belle Nahandove")
- "Aoua!" (incipit: "Aoua! méfiez-vous des blancs" [Ow! Beware of white people])
- "Il est doux" (incipit: "Il est doux de se coucher durant la chaleur" [It is sweet to lie down during the heat])

== Premiere and recordings ==
Jane Bathori sang the premiere on 8 May 1926, in Rome, accompanied by flutist Louis Fleury, cellist Hans Kindler, and pianist Alfredo Casella. The first edition print was made by Luc-Albert Moreau. The first known record was that by Madeleine Grey, a highly regarded singer, in 1932. Recordings include:

- Janet Baker (mezzo-soprano), Richard Adeney (flute), Terence Weil (cello), Lamar Crowson (piano) – L'Oiseau-Lyre SOL 298 – released 1967
- Felicity Palmer (soprano), Judith Pearse (flute), Christopher van Kampen (cello), Clifford Benson (piano) – Argo ZRG 834 – recorded May 24–25 and July 9, 1975, in St John's, Smith Square
- Jan DeGaetani (mezzo-soprano), Paul Dunkel (flute), Donald Anderson (cello), Gilbert Kalish (piano), Nonesuch Records 1978
- Frederica von Stade (mezzo-soprano), Doriot Anthony Dwyer (flute), Jules Eskind (cello), Martin Katz (piano) – CBS Masterworks 36665 – recorded November 10, 1979, in CBS 30th Street Studio
- Nora Gubisch (mezzo-soprano), Magali Mosnier (flute), Jérôme Pernoo (cello), Alain Altinoglu (piano) – Naïve Records V5304 – recorded June 2011 in the Salle Colonne

== See also ==
In 2011, the British composer James Francis Brown wrote a work in three movements for the same instrumentation called Songs of Nature and Farewell, which is a setting of three little-known poems by the French composer Camille Saint-Saëns. In 2015 the British composer Judith Weir wrote a work in three movements for the same instrumentation called Nuits d'Afrique; it was commissioned by Wigmore Hall for the soprano Ailish Tynan. Both works are intended as a companion to Ravel's Chansons madécasses.
