= Shéhérazade (Ravel) =

Compositions by Maurice Ravel

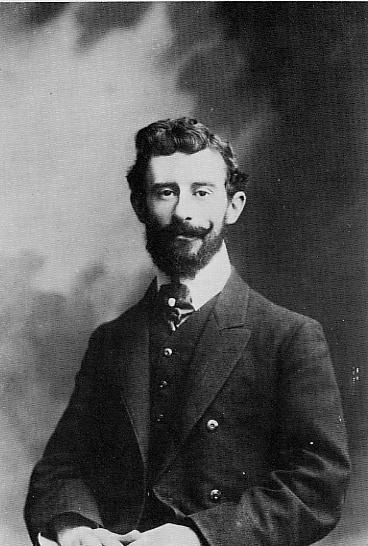
Maurice Ravel in 1907

Shéhérazade is the title of two works by the French composer Maurice Ravel. Both have their origins in the composer's fascination with Scheherazade, the heroine and narrator of The Arabian Nights. The first work, an overture (1898), Ravel's earliest surviving orchestral piece, was not well received at its premiere and has not subsequently been among his most popular works. Four years later he had a much greater success with a song cycle with the same title, which has remained a standard repertoire piece and has been recorded many times.

Both settings are influenced by Russian composers, particularly Rimsky-Korsakov, who had written a symphonic suite based on Scheherazade in 1888. The first composition was heavily influenced by Russian music, the second used a text inspired by Rimsky-Korsakov's symphonic poem. The musical relation between the overture and the song cycle is tenuous.

== Shéhérazade overture ==
Shéhérazade, ouverture de féerie, written in 1898 but unpublished during the composer's lifetime (it was only published in 1975), is a work for orchestra planned as the overture for an opera of the same name.

It was first performed at a concert of the Société Nationale de Musique on 27 May 1899, conducted by the composer. It had a mixed reception, with boos mingling with applause from the audience, and unflattering reviews from the critics. One described the piece as "a jolting debut: a clumsy plagiarism of the Russian School" and called Ravel a "mediocrely gifted debutant ... who will perhaps become something if not someone in about ten years, if he works hard." This critic was "Willy", Henri Gauthier-Villars, who later became an admirer of Ravel. The composer assimilated Willy's criticism, describing the overture as "a clumsy botch-up", and recognising that it was "quite heavily dominated by the influence of Russian music" (assez fortement dominé par l'influence de la musique russe). Another critic, Pierre Lalo, thought that Ravel showed talent, but was too indebted to Debussy and should instead emulate Beethoven.

A programme note for the first performance, unsigned, but thought to be by the composer, reads:

Constructed in the classical form of the overture, the piece opens with an introduction, in which the theme of Scheherezade is given first by an oboe, and then by the horns and trumpets. Then comes the main part of the overture, consisting of:

- Part 1: Initial motif, in B minor. Developments – episodic theme (muted trumpets) bringing in the second motif – in F sharp major – inspired by a Persian melody – conclusion of Part 1.
- Part 2: Development of four themes. Pedal based on the original motif, expanded.
- Part 3: Return of the first and second motifs heard simultaneously. Return of the introduction, serving as a coda.

The playing time of the piece is about 13 minutes.

== Shéhérazade song cycle ==
The exoticism of the Arabian Nights continued to interest Ravel. In the early years of the 20th century he met the poet Tristan Klingsor, who had recently published a collection of free-verse poems under the title Shéhérazade, inspired by Rimsky-Korsakov's symphonic suite of the same name, a work that Ravel also much admired. Ravel and Klingsor were fellow members of a group of young creative artists calling themselves "Les Apaches" (the Hooligans); the poet read some of his new verses to the group, and Ravel was immediately taken with the idea of setting three of them. He asked Klingsor to make some minor changes before he set to work on the music. (Note: Ravel was particularly concerned about the line "En conservant comme Sindbad ma vieille pipe arabe de temps en temps entre mes lèvres" ("Like Sinbad, keeping my old Arab pipe between my lips from time to time"). In Parisian slang, "pipe" had a phallic double-meaning; Klingsor changed the line to have Sinbad raising his Arab cup to his lips.)

Ravel's song cycle Shéhérazade, was composed for soprano solo and orchestra, setting the words of Klingsor's "Asie", "La flûte enchantée", and "L'indifférent". It was first performed on 17 May 1904 at a Société Nationale concert at the Salle Nouveau Théâtre, Paris, with the soprano Jeanne Hatto and an orchestra conducted by Alfred Cortot. The three songs of the cycle are individually dedicated by the composer to Hatto ("Asie"), Marguerite de Saint-Marceaux ("La flûte enchantée") and Emma Bardac ("L'indifférent").

Whether the overture and the song cycle are musically related is debated. According to Ravel's biographer Arbie Orenstein, there is little melodic connection between the overture and the cycle, with the exception of the opening theme of the first song, "Asie", which uses a theme, based on a modally inflected scale, similar to one near the beginning of the overture. Ravel originally conceived the cycle with "Asie" coming last, and this order was adopted at the premiere, but his final preference, in the published score, gives a sequence steadily decreasing in intensity; the critic Caroline Rae writes that the music moves "from rich voluptuousness and gentle lyricism to languid sensuousness".

=== 1. Asie ===
The first, and longest, song of the three is in the key of E♭ minor. It typically lasts ten minutes in performance. It is, in Rae's words, "a panorama of oriental fantasy evoking Arabia, India and, at a dramatic climax, China." With the continually repeated words "je voudrais voir..." ("I should like to see..." or "I want to see..."), the poet, or his imagined speaker, dreams of escape from quotidian life into a European fantasy of Asian enticements. The music increases in intensity as his imaginations become more feverish, until subsiding to end placidly, back in the real world.

Asie: text and English translation

Asie, Asie, Asie,
Vieux pays merveilleux des contes de nourrice
Où dort la fantaisie comme une impératrice,
En sa forêt tout emplie de mystère.
Asie, je voudrais m'en aller avec la goëlette
Qui se berce ce soir dans le port
Mystérieuse et solitaire,
Et qui déploie enfin ses voiles violettes
Comme un immense oiseau de nuit dans le ciel d'or.
Je voudrais m'en aller vers des îles de fleurs,
En écoutant chanter la mer perverse
Sur un vieux rythme ensorceleur.
Je voudrais voir Damas et les villes de Perse
Avec les minarets légers dans l'air.
Je voudrais voir de beaux turbans de soie
Sur des visages noirs aux dents claires;
Je voudrais voir des yeux sombres d'amour
Et des prunelles brillantes de joie
En des peaux jaunes comme des oranges;
Je voudrais voir des vêtements de velours
Et des habits à longues franges.
Je voudrais voir des calumets entre des bouches
Tout entourées de barbe blanche;
Je voudrais voir d'âpres marchands aux regards louches,
Et des cadis, et des vizirs
Qui du seul mouvement de leur doigt qui se penche
Accordent vie ou mort au gré de leur désir.
Je voudrais voir la Perse, et l'Inde, et puis la Chine,
Les mandarins ventrus sous les ombrelles,
Et les princesses aux mains fines,
Et les lettrés qui se querellent
Sur la poésie et sur la beauté;
Je voudrais m'attarder au palais enchanté
Et comme un voyageur étranger
Contempler à loisir des paysages peints
Sur des étoffes en des cadres de sapin,
Avec un personnage au milieu d'un verger;
Je voudrais voir des assassins souriants
Du bourreau qui coupe un cou d'innocent
Avec son grand sabre courbé d'Orient.
Je voudrais voir des pauvres et des reines;
Je voudrais voir des roses et du sang;
Je voudrais voir mourir d'amour ou bien de haine.
Et puis m'en revenir plus tard
Narrer mon aventure aux curieux de rêves
En élevant comme Sindbad ma vieille tasse arabe
De temps en temps jusqu'à mes lèvres
Pour interrompre le conte avec art. . . .

Asia, Asia, Asia!
Ancient, wonderful land of nursery stories
Where fantasy sleeps like an empress,
In her forest filled with mystery.
Asia, I want to sail away on the schooner
That rides in the harbour this evening
Mysterious and solitary,
And finally unfurls purple sails
Like a vast nocturnal bird in the golden sky.
I want to sail away to the islands of flowers,
Listening to the perverse sea singing
To an old bewitching rhythm.
I want to see Damascus and the cities of Persia
With their slender minarets in the air.
I want to see beautiful turbans of silk
Over dark faces with gleaming teeth;
I want to see dark amorous eyes
And pupils sparkling with joy
In skins as yellow as oranges;
I want to see velvet cloaks
And robes with long fringes.
I want to see long pipes in lips
Fringed round by white beards;
I want to see crafty merchants with suspicious glances,
And cadis and viziers
Who with one movement of their bending finger
Decree life or death, at whim.
I want to see Persia, and India, and then China,
Pot-bellied mandarins under their umbrellas,
Princesses with delicate hands,
And scholars arguing
About poetry and beauty;
I want to linger in the enchanted palace
And like a foreign traveller
Contemplate at leisure landscapes painted
On cloth in pinewood frames,
With a figure in the middle of an orchard;
I want to see murderers smiling
While the executioner cuts off an innocent head
With his great curved Oriental sabre.
I want to see paupers and queens;
I want to see roses and blood;
I want to see those who die for love or, better, for hatred.
And then to return home later
To tell my adventure to people interested in dreams
Raising – like Sinbad – my old Arab cup
From time to time to my lips
To interrupt the narrative artfully...

=== 2. La flûte enchantée ===
In this song, a young slave girl tending her sleeping master, hears her lover playing his flute outside. The music, a mixture of sad and joyful, seems to her like a kiss flying to her from her beloved. The flute melody is marked by the use of the Phrygian mode.

La flûte enchantée: text and English translation

L'ombre est douce et mon maître dort
Coiffé d'un bonnet conique de soie
Et son long nez jaune en sa barbe blanche.
Mais moi, je suis éveillée encore
Et j'écoute au dehors
Une chanson de flûte où s'épanche
Tour à tour la tristesse ou la joie.
Un air tour à tour langoureux ou frivole
Que mon amoureux chéri joue,
Et quand je m'approche de la croisée
Il me semble que chaque note s'envole
De la flûte vers ma joue
Comme un mystérieux baiser.

The shade is pleasant and my master sleeps
In his conical silk hat
With his long, yellow nose in his white beard.
But I am still awake
And from outside I listen to
A flute song, pouring out
By turns, sadness and joy.
A tune by turns languorous and carefree
Which my dear lover is playing,
And when I approach the lattice window
It seems to me that each note flies
From the flute to my cheek
Like a mysterious kiss.

=== 3. L'indifférent ===
The final song of the cycle has prompted much speculation. The poet, or his imaginary speaker, is much taken with the charms of an androgynous youth, but fails to persuade him to come into his – or her – house to drink wine. It is not clear whether the boy's admirer is male or female; one of Ravel's colleagues expressed the strong hope that the song would be sung by a woman, as it customarily is. (Note: Both the recordings of the song made in Ravel's lifetime are sung by women; the Ravel scholar Roger Nichols wrote in 2011 that, as far as he knew, no male singer has recorded the song.) The song is in E major, with oscillating string motifs in the orchestral accompaniment which, in Rae's view, are reminiscent of Debussy’s Nocturnes.

L'indifférent: text and English translation

Tes yeux sont doux comme ceux d’une fille,
Jeune étranger,
Et la courbe fine
De ton beau visage de duvet ombragé
Est plus séduisante encore de ligne.
Ta lèvre chante sur le pas de ma porte
Une langue inconnue et charmante
Comme une musique fausse. . .
Entre!
Et que mon vin te réconforte . . .
Mais non, tu passes
Et de mon seuil je te vois t’éloigner
Me faisant un dernier geste avec grâce,
Et la hanche légèrement ployée
Par ta démarche féminine et lasse. . . .

Your eyes are soft as those of any girl,
Young stranger,
And the delicate curve
Of your fine features, shadowed with down
Is still more seductive in profile.
On my doorstep your lips sing
A language unknown and charming
Like music out of tune...
Enter!
And let my wine comfort you ...
But no, you pass by
And from my doorway I watch you go on your way
Giving me a graceful farewell wave,
And your hips gently sway
In your feminine and languid gait...

=== Orchestration and duration ===
The score is orchestrated for two flutes and piccolo, two oboes and cor anglais, two clarinets, two bassoons, four French horns, two trumpets, three trombones, tuba, timpani, snare drum, bass drum, tambourine, triangle, glockenspiel, cymbals, gong, two harps, and strings.

Performance times for the cycle vary and may range from between 15 and 20 minutes in total.

- Asie: 9–11 minutes
- La flûte enchantée: about 3–4 minutes
- L'indifférent: about 3 1/2-4 minutes.

Source: Decca 1963 and His Master's Voice 1967 recordings.

=== Discography ===
- Marcelle Gerar, the Orchestre du Gramophone, Piero Coppola, La Voix de son maître, 5 November 1928
- Suzanne Danco, the Paris Conservatoire Orchestra, Ernest Ansermet, Decca, 1948
- Germaine Moysan, Orchestre National de l’ORTF, Pierre Monteux, Music and Arts, 2006 (live Strasbourg 13 June 1952)
- Suzanne Danco, Orchestre de la Suisse Romande, Ernest Ansermet, Decca, 1955
- Janine Micheau, Orchestre Lamoureux, Jean Fournet, Decca, 1956
- Régine Crespin, the Orchestre de la Suisse Romande, Ernest Ansermet, Decca, 1963
- Jennie Tourel, New York Philharmonic, Leonard Bernstein, Columbia, 1963
- Victoria de los Angeles, Concertgebouw Orchestra, Pierre Monteux, Audiophile Classics 2001 (live Amsterdam 20 November 1963)
- Victoria de los Angeles, Paris Conservatoire Orchestra, Georges Prêtre, EMI, 1963
- Janet Baker, New Philharmonia Orchestra, John Barbirolli, EMI, 1968
- Nedda Casei, Prague Chamber Orchestra, Martin Turnovský, Supraphon, 1969
- Marilyn Horne, Orchestre National de France, Leonard Bernstein, CBS, 1978
- Jessye Norman, London Symphony Orchestra, Colin Davis, Philips, 1980
- Nadine Denize, Orchestre Philharmonique de Lille, Jean-Claude Casadesus, Harmonia Mundi, 1980
- Frederica von Stade, Boston Symphony Orchestra, Seiji Ozawa, CBS, 1981
- Elly Ameling, San Francisco Symphony, Edo de Waart, Philips 1982
- Teresa Berganza, Orchestre national du Capitole de Toulouse, Michel Plasson, EMI Classics, 1984
- Heather Harper, BBC Symphony Orchestra, Pierre Boulez, CBS, 1984
- Hildegard Behrens, Wiener Symphoniker, Francis Travis, Decca, 1984
- Kiri Te Kanawa, Orchestra of the Belgian National Opera, John Pritchard, EMI, 1984
- Rachel Yakar, Orchestre de la Suisse Romande, Armin Jordan, Erato 1986
- Barbara Hendricks, Orchestre de l'Opéra de Lyon, John Eliot Gardiner, EMI, 1988
- Margaret Price, London Symphony Orchestra, Claudio Abbado, Deutsche Grammophon, 1989
- Maria Ewing, City of Birmingham Symphony Orchestra, Simon Rattle, EMI, 1991
- Arleen Auger, Philharmonia Orchestra, Libor Pešek, EMI, 1992
- Linda Finnie, Ulster Orchestra, Yan Pascal Tortelier, Chandos, 1992
- Vesselina Kasarova, ORF-Symphonieorchester, Pinchas Steinberg, BMG, 1995
- Catherine Dubosc, Orchestre symphonique de Montréal, Charles Dutoit, Decca, 1995
- Sylvia McNair, Boston Symphony Orchestra, Seiji Ozawa, Philips, 1998
- Felicity Lott, Orchestre de la Suisse Romande, Armin Jordan, Æon, 2003
- Anne Sofie von Otter, Cleveland Orchestra, Pierre Boulez, Deutsche Grammophon, 2004
- Susan Graham, BBC Symphony Orchestra, Yan Pascal Tortelier, Erato, 2005
- Bernarda Fink, Deutsches Symphonie-Orchester Berlin, Kent Nagano, Harmonia Mundi, 2007
- Jennifer Larmore, Grant Park Symphony Orchestra, Carlos Kalmar, Cedille Records, 2008
- Véronique Gens, Orchestre national des Pays de la Loire, John Axelrod, Ondine 2012
- Renée Fleming, Orchestre Philharmonique de Radio France, Alan Gilbert, Decca 2012
- Karine Deshayes, Luxembourg Philharmonic Orchestra, Emmanuel Krivine, Zig-Zag 2012
- Magdalena Kožená, Berliner Philharmoniker, Simon Rattle, Deutsche Grammophon, 2012
- Stella Doufexis, Deutsche Staatsphilharmonie Rheinland, Karl-Heinz Steffens, Berlin Classics, 2013
- Christiane Karg, Bamberg Symphony, David Afkham, Berlin Classics 2017
- Isabelle Druet, Orchestre National de Lyon, Leonard Slatkin, Naxos 2017
- Ian Bostridge, Seattle Symphony Orchestra, Ludovic Morlot, Seattle Symphony Media, 2019
- Kateřina Kněžiková, Janáček Philharmonic Orchestra, Robert Jindra, Supraphon, 2021
- Marie-Nicole Lemieux, Orchestre Philharmonique de Monte-Carlo, Kazuki Yamada, Erato, 2023
- Fleur Barron, Barcelona Symphony Orchestra, Ludovic Morlot, L'Auditori, 2025

== Notes, references and sources ==
=== Sources ===
- Blakeman, Edward (1990). Notes to Chandos CD 8914. Colchester: Chandos Records. OCLC 28488316.
- Nichols, Roger (1977). Ravel. Master Musicians. London: Dent. ISBN 978-0-460-03146-2.
- Nichols, Roger (2011). Ravel. New Haven, US and London: Yale University Press. ISBN 978-0-300-10882-8.
- Orenstein, Arbie (1991) [1975]. Ravel: Man and Musician. Mineola, US: Dover. ISBN 978-0-486-26633-6.
