= Hot Springs Music Festival =

The Hot Springs Music Festival was a not-for-profit educational music festival held in Hot Springs National Park, Hot Springs, Arkansas. During the first two weeks of June, "pre-professional" musicians joined professional mentor musicians in performance of concert music. Yearly programs included 4 orchestral concerts and numerous chamber music concerts. Venues included the Oaklawn Performing Arts School and various churches in the city. All rehearsals were open to the public. Approximately 10,000 people attended the festival to watch 20 concerts and 250 rehearsals. Additionally, around 6.4 million people tuned in to listen via radio.

Since its inaugural season in 1996, the Hot Springs Music Festival mentored over 1600 apprentices. The Festival offered apprenticeships in each of the orchestral instruments as well as collaborative piano, voice, conducting, production, recording engineering, and arts administration. Festival apprentices came from all over the world and were evaluated competitively against other applicants. Each accepted apprentice received a full tuition scholarship for the two-week festival.

The Hot Springs Music Festival Symphony Orchestra recorded six discs on the Naxos Records label. They also appeared on four additional compilation discs, also on the Naxos label.

The last season took place on June 4–18, 2022. In 2023, the festival was canceled primarily due to funding difficulties.

The Hot Springs Music Festival was discontinued in 2024, but it changed hands and became the Ozark Music Festival in 2025, held in Fayetteville, AR.
