= Susanne Mentzer =

American operatic mezzo-soprano (born 1957)

Susanne Mentzer (born January 21, 1957) is an American operatic mezzo-soprano. She is best known for singing trouser roles, such as Cherubino in Mozart's Le nozze di Figaro, Idamante in Mozart's Idomeneo, Octavian in Richard Strauss' Der Rosenkavalier and the composer in Strauss' Ariadne auf Naxos, as well as other music of Mozart, Strauss, Rossini, Berlioz and Mahler.

She created the role of the mother of Yueyang in Tan Dun's opera The First Emperor at the Metropolitan Opera on December 21, 2006. She has also premiered works by Libby Larsen, Daniel Brewbaker and Carlisle Floyd.

== Biography ==
Mentzer was born in Philadelphia, Pennsylvania and raised in Maryland and New Mexico. She was first introduced to opera as a teenager, when she worked as an usher at the Santa Fe Opera. She studied music therapy at the University of the Pacific and received her bachelor's and master's degrees at the Juilliard School. She later participated in the Houston Grand Opera Studio.

Mentzer made her Metropolitan Opera debut in the role of Cherubino on January 4, 1989. Further roles she has sung at the Met include Octavian, Idamante, Nicklausse in Offenbach's Les Contes d'Hoffmann, the composer in Ariadne auf Naxos, Rosina in Rossini's Il barbiere di Siviglia, Dorabella in Mozart's Così fan tutte, Mélisande in Debussy's Pelléas et Mélisande, Meg Page in Verdi's Falstaff, Marcellina in The Marriage of Figaro.

She has also appeared at Lyric Opera of Chicago, the San Francisco Opera, the Houston Grand Opera, La Scala, Covent Garden, Vienna State Opera, the Cologne Opera the Opéra de Paris and at the Salzburg Festival. Besides the roles she has sung at the Metropolitan Opera, her operatic repertoire includes Zerlina in Mozart's Don Giovanni, the title role of Rossini's La Cenerentola, Dido in Purcell's Dido and Aeneas, Adalgisa in Bellini's Norma and Jane Seymour in Donizetti's Anna Bolena.

In addition to many audio recordings, Mentzer has appeared on television in performances of Le nozze di Figaro, Così fan tutte and the First Emperor and on DVDs in performances of Don Giovanni, Les Contes d'Hoffmann, The First Emperor and Mahler's Resurrection Symphony.

Through 2012, she served on the faculty of Rice University's Shepherd School of Music. She previously served on the faculty of DePaul University. She currently has a private studio based in San Francisco. In 2016, Mentzer joined the voice faculty of the San Francisco Conservatory of Music.

Susanne Mentzer is the sister of fantasy writer and game designer Frank Mentzer.

== Recordings ==
- Nuits d'été & La damoiselle élue (1983), Columbia CD
- James Levine's 25th Anniversary Metropolitan Opera Gala (1996), Deutsche Grammophon DVD, B0004602-09
