= Évariste de Parny =

French Rococo poet (1753–1814)

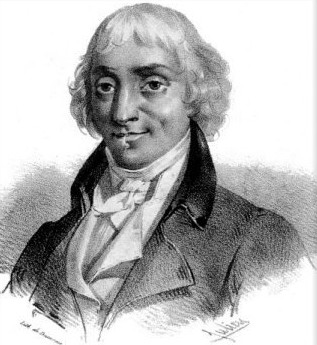
Évariste de Forges de Parny

Évariste Desiré de Forges, vicomte de Parny (6 February 1753 – 5 December 1814) was a French Rococo poet.

== Biography ==
De Parny was born in Saint-Paul on the Isle of Bourbon (now Réunion); he came from an aristocratic family from the region of Berry, which had settled on the island in 1698. He left the island at the age of ten years to return to France with his two brothers, Jean-Baptiste and Chériseuil. He studied with the Oratoriens at their college in Rennes and decided to enter their religious order. He studied theology for six months at the collège Saint-Firmin in Paris, but decided finally instead on a military career, explaining that he was not religious enough to become a monk, and that he was attracted to Christianity mainly by the poetic imagery of the Bible. His brother Jean-Baptiste, an equerry of the Count of Artois, introduced him at the French Court at Versailles, where he met two other soldiers, who, like him, were from the French colonies, and would make their names in poetry; Antoine de Bertin, also from the Isle of Bourbon, and Nicolas-Germain Léonard, from Guadeloupe.

In 1773, he visited his father and family on the Isle of Bourbon. During his visit, he fell in love with Esther Lelièvre, but her father forbad them to marry. Missing Paris, he returned to France in 1775. Soon after he left, he learned that the Esther Lelièvre had married a doctor on the island. His unhappy romance inspired his first published poems, Les Poésies érotiques, which appeared in 1778, where Esther appeared under the name of Éléanore. The collection of poems brought great success and celebrity to its author.

On November 6, 1779, Parny was named a captain in the Queen's Regiment of Dragoons. In 1783, he returned to the Isle of Bourgon to settle the estate of his father, who had died, and also visited the Isle de France. In 1785, he left the Isle of Bourbon for Pondicherry in India, where he became an aide de camp to the Governor-General of the French colonies in India.

He was not at all happy in India, but he gathered a part of the material for his Chansons Madécasses (Eng: Songs of Madagascar), one of the first prose poems written in the French language. He soon moved back to France, where he left the army and moved to a house he owned in the valley of Feuillancourt, between Saint-Germain-en-Laye and Marly-le-Roi. The house was named La Caserne (Eng: The barracks), and with Bertin and Léonard, they formed a literary club called "The Society of the Barracks" which met regularly at the house.

When the French Revolution broke out, Parny, who did not receive any pension from the King and was not particularly interested in politics, played no part. He did, however, have to settle the debts left by his brother Jean-Baptiste, and, in 1795, these debts nearly ruined him. He was forced to take a position in the offices of the Ministry of the Interior for thirteen months, and then worked in the Administration of the Theater and the Arts. In 1804, the Count of Nantes found him another government position.

In 1802, Parny married Marie-Françoise Vally, and, the following year was received into the Académie française, where he occupied the 36th armchair. In 1813, Emperor Napoleon I granted him a pension of three thousand francs a year, but this was stopped under the Restoration of the monarchy in 1814. He died on December 5, 1814, in Paris.

== Literary reputation and influence ==
Parny became known for his Poésies érotiques (1778) a collection of love poems which brought a breath of fresh air to the formal academic poetry of the 18th century. He is also known for his Chansons madécasses (1787), which he called translations of songs of the island of Madagascar, which are considered the first prose poems in French. They were illustrated by artist J-E Laboureur (1920)[1] and some of them were set to music by Maurice Ravel (Chansons madécasses, 1925).

Parny's early love poems and elegies are characterised by the combination of tenderness, fancy and wit. One famous piece, the Elegy on a Young Girl, is an example.

He also published Voyage de Bourgogne (1777), written in collaboration with his friend Antoine de Bertin (1752–1790); Épître aux insurgents de Boston (Eng: Letter to the insurgents in Boston) in 1777, and Opuscules poétiques (1779). In 1796 he published La Guerre des Dieux (Eng: The War of the Gods), a poem in the style of Voltaire's Pucelle, directed against the Church. The book was banned by the French government in 1827, long after his death, but still appeared in many clandestine editions.

Parny devoted himself in his later years almost entirely to religious and political burlesque. In 1805 he produced an extraordinary allegorical poem attacking George III, his family and his subjects, under the eccentric title of "Goddam! Goddam! par un French-dog."

The poems of De Parny were extremely popular in France and as far away as Russia in the beginning of the 19th century. "I learned by heart the elegies of the Chevalier de Parny, and I still know them," wrote Chateaubriand in 1813. The Russian poet Alexander Pushkin wrote, "Parny, he's my master." The 20th-century Russian poet Anna Akhmatova recorded Pushkin's admiration for Parny in a poem: "There lay your three-cornered hat, and a dog-eared tome of Parny."

His Œuvres choisies (Eng:Selected Works) were published in 1827. There is a sketch of Parny in Sainte-Beuve's Portraits contemporains.

== Quotations ==
- "Ne disons point au jour les secrets de la nuit." ("Don't tell the secrets of the night to the day.") (Élégies)
- "Une indifference paisible est la plus sage des vertus." ("A peaceful indifference is the wisest of virtues") (Élégies)
- "Va, crois-moi, le plaisir est toujours légitime." ("Believe me, pleasure is always legitimate"). (Élégies)
- "La voix du sentiment ne peut nous égarer, et l'on n'est point coupable en suivant la nature." ("The voice of feeling cannot lead us astray; and one can never be guilty for following nature.") (Élégies)
- "La varieté est la source de tous nos plaisirs, et le plaisir cesse de l'être quand il devient habitude." ("Variety is the source of all of our pleasures, and pleasure stops when it becomes habit.") (Letters, 1775.)
- "Du calme et du repos quelquefois on se lasse/On ne se lasse point d'aimer ou d'être aimé." ("Of peace and quiet we sometimes grow weary, But never of loving or being loved.") (Les Paradis)
- "Il ne faut jamais gâcher une apologie par une excuse" ("One should never spoil an apology with an excuse")

== Bibliography ==
- Voyage de Bourgogne, en vers et en prose, with Antoine de Bertin, 1777
- Épître aux insurgents de Boston, 1777
- Poésies érotiques, 1778
- Opuscules poétiques, 1779
- Élégies, 1784
- Chansons madécasses, 1787
- La Guerre des Dieux, poème en 10 chants, 1799
- Goddam !, poème en 4 chants, 1804
- Le Portefeuille Volé (Eng: The Stolen Wallet), 1805 (Containing Les Déguisements de Vénus, (The Disguises of Venus) Les Galanteries de la Bible (The Gallantries of the Bible), and Le Paradis perdu (Eng:Paradise Lost) A Poem in four songs.
- Le Voyage de Céline, (Eng: The Voyage of Celine) poem, 1806

== Bibliography ==
- Robert Mauzi, Sylvain Menant, Michel Delon, Précis de littérature française du XVIIIe siècle, Presses Universitaires de France, 1990.
