= Absolutely on Music =

2011 book by Haruki Murakami and Seiji Ozawa

Absolutely on Music: Conversations
- Author: Haruki Murakami; Seiji Ozawa
- Translator: Jay Rubin
- Publisher: Shinchosha (Japanese); Knopf (English)
- Publication date: November 30, 2011 (Japanese); November 15, 2016 (English)
- Awards: Hideo Kobayashi Prize
- ISBN: 978-4103534280
- Preceded by: 1Q84
- Followed by: 色彩を持たない多崎つくると、彼の巡礼の年 (Colorless Tsukuru Tazaki and His Years of Pilgrimage)

Absolutely on Music: Conversations (小澤征爾さんと、音楽について話をする, Ozawa Seiji-san to, ongaku ni tsuite hanashi o suru; lit. 'With Seiji Ozawa, talking about music') is a 2011 book by Haruki Murakami and Seiji Ozawa, published by Shinchosha. In 2012, the book won the Hideo Kobayashi Prize. In 2016, an English translation by Jay Rubin was published by Knopf.

== Contents ==
The book consists of an introduction by Murakami, an afterword by Ozawa, and six conversations between the two taking place between 2010 and 2011, mostly regarding classical music. The conversations, involving many of the performances spanning Ozawa's career, balance Ozawa's decades-long experience as a music conductor with Murakami's relative lack of technical knowledge as a self-avowed music lover. Some conversations deviate into more personal territory such as Ozawa's interest in art museums.

In The Guardian, Murakami stated that although he often went to Ozawa's shows in Boston in the nineties, he never talked to Ozawa about music up until much later. It was due to the friendship between Murakami's wife and Ozawa's daughter that an "acquaintance" between Murakami and Ozawa formed, albeit a casual one which still didn't involve their respective art practices. After Ozawa was diagnosed with esophageal cancer in 2009, however, his musical activities lessened in intensity, which Murakami cited as a possible reason why they began to speak more frequently about music. The idea for the book came about when Ozawa visited Murakami, during which Ozawa told Murakami a story about Glenn Gould and Leonard Bernstein's 1962 performance of Brahms' First Piano Concerto.

== Critical reception ==
Kirkus Reviews called the book "A work that general readers will enjoy and the musical cognoscenti will devour."

James R. Oestreich, writing for The New York Times, noted that "There is much good, solid musical discussion and information here. But there are also too many muddled volleys off the top of the head, lacking the needed factual follow-up and correction." For instance, Oestreich pulled a passage where Murakami and Ozawa implied that Carnegie Hall had been renovated between Ozawa's respective concerts there in 1996 and 2004. However, Carnegie Hall's last major renovations prior to Ozawa's 2004 performance was in 1986, as well as a minor renovation in 1995 that had no bearing on acoustics. Oestreich also took issue with Murakami's approach to the question of why Mahler was neglected in Vienna, which Murakami answered by primarily citing the possible preferences of Viennese conductors as opposed to, as Oestreich countered, Nazi censorship.

R. O. Kwon, in The Guardian, said that the book "is an unprecedented treasure, valuable if for no other reason than that these conversations mark the first time that Ozawa has reflected at length on his 50-plus years of conducting", although with some acknowledgement that the medium of text meant that some conversations were not "entirely intelligible".

The Los Angeles Review of Books observed "The sheer enthusiasm on display in Absolutely on Music". The Classical Station wrote that "It’s clear that these were not scripted, but were instead an outpouring of genuine affection and love for classical music. They are natural and friendly, offering the reader a glimpse of a friendship deepened by mutual respect for the other’s field." WOSU said "Whether you are a musician with a master's degree in theory, a blossoming author or a layman in both subjects, this book is understandable, fresh and deeply rewarding." The Arts Desk found some of the conversations inconsistent in quality and understanding but noted "At best, though, these servants of sister muses maintain an easy rapport." The Christian Science Monitor wrote that "Murakami is not an expert musician – he doesn’t study scores or analyze harmonic shifts and patterns based on any formal training. But this does not prevent him from participating in the conversations as an equal." The Japan Times considered the book's setup, of "A fan, knowledgeable about an art form in the way that only obsessive fans are, in conversation with a master practitioner of the art in question", to be "ideal". The Irish Times concluded: "Sporadically useful for providing a deepening understanding of music, this book’s real value is in how it documents a friendship enlivened by a profound and rapturous passion."

== Adaptations ==
In 2013, Universal Music Japan released a three-disc set compiling the works of classical music that Murakami and Ozawa discuss, such as takes on Brahms by Glenn Gould, suites from Leonard Bernstein's career, and Ozawa's conducted performances with the Saito Kinen Orchestra, the Boston Symphony Orchestra, and others.
