= Collaborative piano =

Collaborative piano is a discipline of music that combines piano performance, accompaniment, and music pedagogy (and often, vocal coaching).

== Genres ==
=== Instrumental literature ===
One responsibility of the collaborative pianist is to perform the piano part of the instrumental sonata literature. These are duo chamber works, and the role of the pianist in this genre is that of equal partner with the instrumentalist. This includes a large number of works such as but not limited to the following important works from the string repertoire:

- Wolfgang A. Mozart, Sonatas for Piano and Violin
- Ludwig van Beethoven, 10 Sonatas for Piano and Violin, 5 Sonatas for Cello and Piano
- Franz Schubert, 3 Sonatinas for Violin and Piano, et al.
- Robert Schumann, 3 Sonatas for Violin and Piano
- Cesar Franck, Sonata for Violin and Piano
- Johannes Brahms, 3 Sonatas for Violin and Piano, 2 Sonatas for Cello and Piano, 2 Sonatas for Clarinet (or Viola) and Piano
- Edvard Grieg, 3 Sonatas for Violin and Piano, Sonata for Cello and Piano
- Gabriel Fauré, 2 Sonatas for Violin and Piano, 2 Sonatas for Cello and Piano
- Claude Debussy, Violin Sonata, Cello Sonata
- Richard Strauss, Violin Sonata, Cello Sonata
- George Enescu, 3 Sonatas for Violin and Piano, 2 Sonatas for Cello and Piano
- Sergei Prokofiev, 2 Sonatas for Violin and Piano, Sonata for Cello and Piano

In addition to sonatas, the instrumental collaborative piano literature includes short pieces, often of a virtuoso nature. In this genre, the original work is often for a soloist with orchestral accompaniment; but in order to enable the work to be performed under wider circumstances, composers often also write piano reductions of the orchestral score.

Another important responsibility of the collaborative pianist is to perform the accompaniment of other, multi-movement non-chamber works such as concertos. In this role, the collaborative pianist is often serving as a rehearsal partner for the study of this extensive repertoire as preparation for the instrumentalist's subsequent performance with orchestral accompaniment.

== Notable artists ==
- Gerald Moore
- Malcolm Martineau
- Margo Garrett
- Jean Barr
- Martin Katz
- Warren Jones
- Roger Vignoles
- Lina Coen

== Sources on collaborative piano and accompanying ==
Algernon Lindo. The Art of Accompanying. New York: G. Schirmer, 1916.

Coenraad V. Bos and Ashley Pettis. The Well-Tempered Accompanist. Bryn Mawr, PA: Theodore Presser, 1949.

Cranmer, Philip. The Technique of Accompaniment. London: Dennis Dobson, 1970.

Dian Baker. “A Resource Manual for the Collaborative Pianist: Twenty Class Syllabi for Teaching Collaborative Piano Skills and an Annotated Bibliography.” DMA doc., Arizona State University, 2006.

Elana Estrin. “It Takes Two,” The Strad 121, no. 1439 (March 2010): 56-62.

Gerald Moore. Farewell Recital: Further Memoirs. New York: Taplinger, 1978.

Gerald Moore. Furthermore: Interludes in an Accompanist’s Life. London: Hamilton, 1983.

Gerald Moore. Singer and Accompanist: The Performance of Fifty Songs. Westport, CT: Greenwood Press, [1973].

Gerald Moore. The Unashamed Accompanist. Rev. ed. London: Methuen, 1959.

Guilherme Montenegro. "Besides playing, we have to teach": pedagogical dimensions in the actuation of the collaborative pianist. Scotland, Glasgow: Proceedings of the 32nd ISME World Conference, 2016.

___________________. "The collaborative pianist and his modes of being and acting: an interview study with professionals in a Brazilian music school". Porto Alegre, Brazil: Proceedings of the 31st ISME World Conference, 2015.

Kurt Adler. The Art of Accompanying and Coaching. Minneapolis, MN: University of Minnesota Press, 1965.

Martin Katz, The Complete Collaborator: The Pianist as Partner. Oxford: Oxford University Press, 2009.

Robert Spillman. The Art of Accompanying: Master Lessons from the Repertoire. New York: Schirmer Books, 1985.

Ruthann Boles McTyre. Library Resources for Singers, Coaches, and Accompanists: An Annotated Bibliography, 1970-1997. Westport, CT: Greenwood Press, 1998.

== Music festivals ==
- Aspen Music Festival and School
- Blue Lake Fine Arts Camp
- Brevard Music Center
- Hot Springs Music Festival
- Interlochen Center for the Arts
- Music Academy of the West
