= Doriot Anthony Dwyer =

American flutist (1922–2020)

- Born: Doriot Anthony; March 6, 1922; Streator, Illinois
- Died: March 14, 2020 (aged 98) Lawrence, Kansas
- Genre: Classical
- Occupations: Flutist, professor
- Instrument: Flute
- Years active: 1943–2008
- Label: Deutsche Grammophon

Doriot Anthony Dwyer (/ˈdɔːrioʊ/; March 6, 1922 – March 14, 2020) was an American flutist. She was one of the first women to be awarded principal chair for a major U.S. orchestra (following hornist Helen Kotas, who was appointed principal horn of the Chicago Symphony in 1941). She was the principal flute for the Boston Symphony Orchestra from 1952 until 1990. She was second flute for the National Symphony Orchestra and the Los Angeles Philharmonic. She was an adjunct professor of music at Boston University.

== Early life ==
Doriot Anthony Dwyer was born in Streator, Illinois on March 6, 1922. Her father, Wiliam C. Anthony, played bass and her mother, Edith (Maurer) Anthony, was an accomplished flutist, who played with her sisters on the Chautauqua Redpath circuit. Her father was related to suffragette Susan B. Anthony, though he disapproved of his famous cousin's work.

Though Dwyer requested to begin studying the flute at age six, her mother made her wait until age eight. She studied under her mother for one year, then began studying under Chicago Symphony Orchestra first chair flute, Ernest Leigl. At age 15, she qualified for the Illinois All-State Orchestra, and during her senior year in high school she won the national solo competition to attend the Interlochen Center for the Arts. While at Interlochen, she was offered a scholarship to study with Joseph Mariano at the Eastman School of Music.

While attending Eastman, Dwyer first experienced gender bias in the music industry. Though she was permitted to play first chair in certain symphonic band selections, she was never selected as first chair for the student orchestra. After her freshman year, Dwyer auditioned for a piccolo position with the Pittsburgh Symphony. Upon impressing the conductor with her playing of a recent Stravinsky piece, he said, "You don't want to play in Pittsburgh. They're all men!" Upon graduation from Eastman in 1943, she won the position of second chair flute with the National Symphony Orchestra in Washington, D.C.

== Early career ==
Dwyer remained with the National Symphony Orchestra for two years, then in 1945 left for New York City to try her hand at freelancing. She was asked to perform with the jazz ensemble accompanying Frank Sinatra, and later with the Ballets Russes.

When the ballet run ended, she moved to Los Angeles where she first worked in recording studios. In 1946, she was awarded second chair with the Los Angeles Philharmonic. She was also selected as principal with the Hollywood Bowl Orchestra and a west coast radio orchestra. Of her time in Los Angeles, Dwyer said, "I considered those years in Los Angeles my 'college'.”

== Boston Symphony Orchestra ==
In 1952, the Boston Symphony Orchestra announced the retirement of its principal flutist, Georges Laurent. Dwyer submitted her application, specifically applying as "Miss" Doriot Anthony, so there would be no confusion over her gender-neutral first name. Her application included a recommendation from violinist Isaac Stern and an unsolicited recommendation from Los Angeles Philharmonic conductor Bruno Walter. During the auditions, Boston Symphony director Charles Munch was unimpressed with the applicants and agreed to have a "Ladies Day" audition. After a grueling competition, the other female flutist was dismissed and Munch asked Dwyer to return for a second audition, to which she replied, "No!" She surmised that a second audition would allow them time to seek out a European flutist and was also a test of her will and ability to audition successfully a second time. Two months later, she was named first chair flute of the Boston Symphony Orchestra.

Her appearance on the Boston music scene prompted newspaper headlines: "Woman Crashes Boston Symphony: Eyebrows Lifted as Miss Anthony sat at Famous Flutist's Desk," and "Flutist, 30 and Pretty, Here with Boston Symphony." The press noted her attire—a long-sleeved, floor-length black dress—and one noted that she "dressed well without aiming at spectacular effect, and her lipstick, though generously applied, is the right shade for her coloring". The BSO announced her hiring with a press release that described her as "young, with a dimpled chin, careful coiffure, smallish stature, and an absence of the Domineering Female suggestion".

The Boston Globe called October 18, 1952 "Ladies’ Day" since the performance also featured French pianist Lélia Gousseau. Warren Storey Smith's review noted that Dwyer "handled her part in the Bach’s charming Suite deftly and musically and in the final Badinerie with a degree of virtuosity that elicited from her fellow-players something midway between a gasp of astonishment and a shout of approval, while the audience expressed its appreciation in no uncertain terms."

While much of the press focused on her breaking the gender barrier, many musicians were more impressed with a second chair ascending to principal. Dwyer herself felt similarly, stating in a 1952 Boston Globe article, "Gradually, during my life, I've got used to the idea that I'm a woman."

The symphony soon realized that it had no accommodations for its female musicians. The only other female, a harp player, offered to share her harp's case, which she used as her dressing room. Dwyer declined and was assigned a spare green room as her dressing room. In an interview with flutist James Galway, she noted that the interview was taking place in her original dressing room.

During her 38 years with the Boston Symphony Orchestra, she won critical acclaim for performances under such famed conductors as Charles Munch, Erich Leinsdorf, William Steinberg, Seiji Ozawa, and guest conductors Georg Solti, Pierre Boulez, Leonard Bernstein and Klaus Tennstedt.

In 1960, composer Ingolf Dahl dedicated his Serenade for Four Flutes to Dwyer. They had become friends at Tanglewood in the 1950s.

Upon the announcement of Dwyer's retirement in 1989, the Boston Symphony Orchestra commissioned Ellen Taaffe Zwilich to compose a Concerto for Flute and Orchestra for her, which premiered on April 26, 1990. The caption below a photo of her in the Boston Globe said: "Doriot Anthony Dwyer, a living legend of flute playing."

== Later life ==
Dwyer was an adjunct professor of music at Boston University and was on the faculty at the Boston Conservatory. She received honorary doctorates from Regis College, Simmons College, and Harvard University in 1982. She was the recipient of the Sanford Medal from Yale University in 1975, a Lifetime Achievement Award from the National Flute Association in 1993, and the Hutchison Medal from the University of Rochester in 1995. The Boston Woodwind Society's Flute Merit award is named in her honor.

Dwyer was inducted into the inaugural class of the Rochester Music Hall of Fame in 2012.

She died in Lawrence, Kansas, on March 14, 2020, aged 98. She had moved there from Brookline in 2015 to be close to her daughter, Arienne Dwyer, a linguistic anthropologist at the University of Kansas.

== Awards and recognitions ==
- 1975 – Sanford Medal Recipient – Yale University School of Music
- 1979 – The Supersisters trading card set was produced and distributed; one of the cards featured Dwyer's name and picture.
- 1993 – Lifetime Achievement Award – National Flute Association
- 1995 – Hutchison Medal Recipient – University of Rochester
- 2006 – Flute Merit Award (Named in honor of Doriot Anthony Dwyer) – Boston Woodwind Society
- 2012 – Inductee in the Rochester, New York Music Hall of Fame
- 2014 – Inductee in the Streator Township High School "Worthy" Hall of Fame

== Discography ==
- Maurice Ravel: Chansons madécasses, with Frederica von Stade (mezzo-soprano), Jules Eskin (cello) and Martin Katz (piano), Columbia, 1981
