= Nicolas-Germain Léonard =

18th century Guadeloupean writer

- Born: 16 March 1744; Guadeloupe
- Died: 26 January 1793 (aged 48)
- Writing career
- Genres: poetry romance
- Notable work: Les lettres de deux amants habitants de Lyon

Nicolas-Germain Léonard (16 March 1744 – 26 January 1793) was a poet and one of Guadeloupe's first writers.

Léonard was born in Guadeloupe, but spent most of his life in France, travelling back and forth frequently. He first moved to France while young, receiving his education there, and was spurred to return later in life by the political situation in the French colonies during the period of the French Revolution. Slavery was an important issue in the colonies, and Léonard was white. He died in Nantes, aged 48.

His fairly conventional poetry is most interesting today for its "astonishing evidence for the experience of living through revolutionary France during the months after the declaration of the republic and the trials against Louis XVI".

O lovely place! O Happy Land!
O France, sanctuary of the fine arts!
I bewail the people whose fate
distances them so far from you

They will come, those Days of Darkness,
Where the heavy Finger of Age
Will cover the Images of my Spring
With the Veil of Death.

The French minister Chauvelin was interested in Léonard's poetry and appointed him chargé d'affaires (diplomat) at Liège. There Léonard wrote "Les lettres de deux amants habitants de Lyon" (1783), a popular romance that was translated into English and Italian. In 1787, he published the fourth edition of his work in three volumes. His work would later attract literary critic Charles-Augustin Sainte-Beuve.
