= Martin Katz (pianist) =

American pianist, educator and conductor

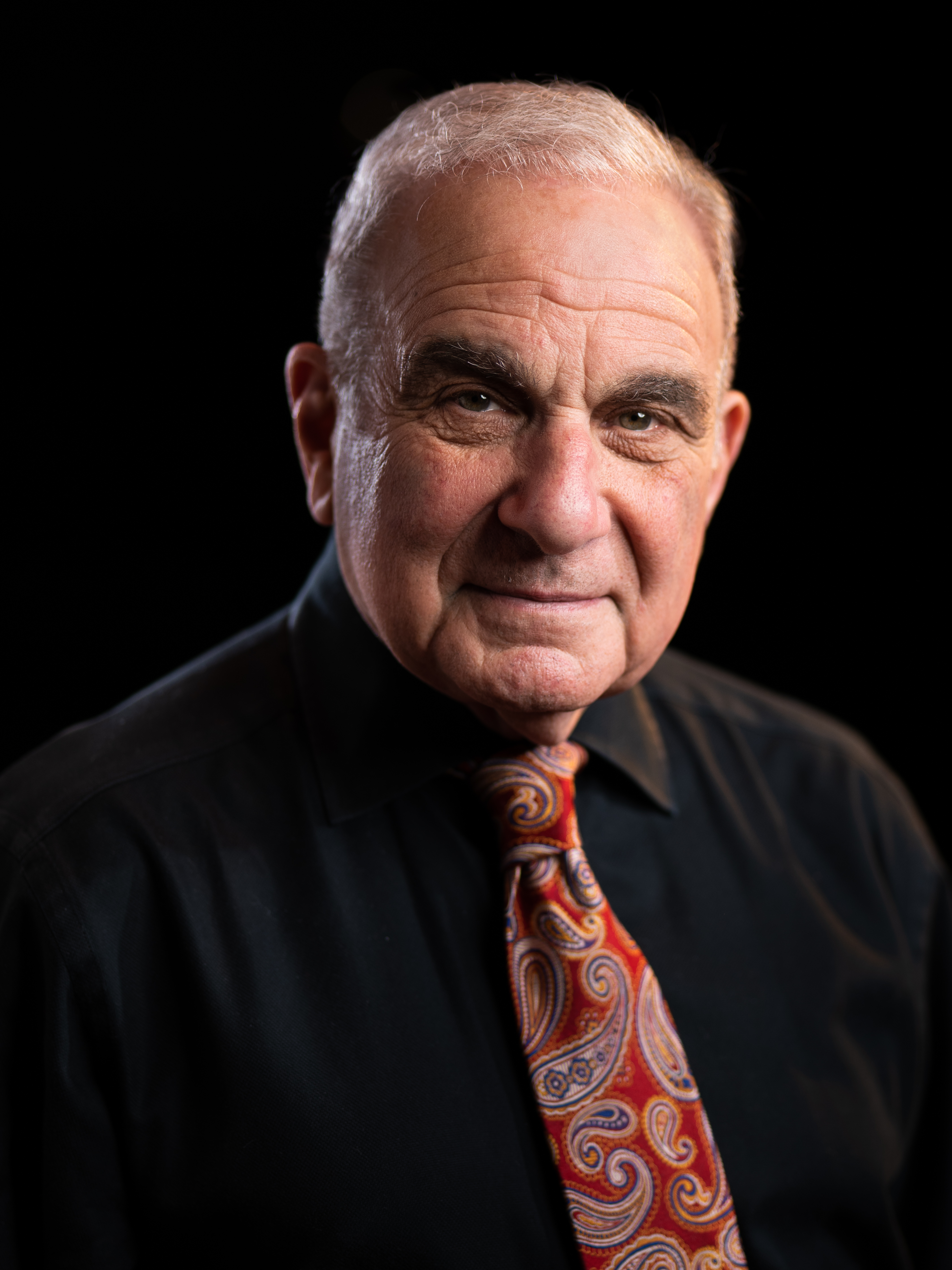
- Born: November 27, 1945 (age 80)
- Education: University of Southern California
- Occupations: Pianist, conductor, collaborative pianist, music educator
- Years active: 1968–present
- Organization: University of Michigan School of Music, Theatre & Dance
- Awards: Musical America Accompanist of the Year (1998)

Martin Katz (born November 27, 1945, Los Angeles, California) is an American pianist, educator and conductor, primarily known for his work as an accompanist. Dubbed the "dean of collaborative pianists" by The Los Angeles Times and the "gold standard of accompanists" by The New York Times, Katz is known for his multi-decade recital partnerships with leading opera singers. He served on the faculty of the University of Michigan School of Music, Theatre & Dance from 1983 until his retirement as professor emeritus in May 2025.

== Early life and education ==
Katz was trained as a collaborative pianist by Gwendolyn Koldofsky at the Thornton School of Music, part of the University of Southern California; where he was a member of the USC's music fraternity Phi Mu Alpha Sinfonia. He is also an alumnus of the Music Academy of the West. While a student at USC, he served as an accompanist for masterclasses and studio lessons given by classical figures including Lotte Lehmann, Jascha Heifetz, Pierre Bernac, and Gregor Piatigorsky.

From 1966 to 1969, he served in the U.S. Army as a member of the United States Army Band (Pershing's Own) in Washington, DC and as a piano soloist and accompanist with the United States Army Chorus. When he returned to civilian life, he embarked upon a thirty year career that saw him collaborating with many of the most acclaimed classical singers of the day.

== Career and performance ==
Katz has performed across major international venues, including Carnegie Hall, La Scala, Wigmore Hall, the Salzburg Festival, the Paris Opera, the Sydney Opera House, and the Vienna Musikverein. His major vocal collaborations include 38 years as the exclusive pianist for Marilyn Horne, 32 years as the primary pianist for Frederica von Stade, and 19 years as the exclusive pianist for David Daniels. He has performed and recorded with Cecilia Bartoli, Kathleen Battle, Kiri Te Kanawa, Sylvia McNair, Karita Mattila, José Carreras, Samuel Ramey, and Piotr Beczała. He worked as a conductor, and prepared editions of baroque and bel canto operas that were performed at the Metropolitan Opera, the Houston Grand Opera and Opera Lyra Ottawa.

As a guest conductor, he has led concerts and operatic productions with the BBC Symphony Orchestra, the NHK Symphony Orchestra, the Houston Symphony, the National Symphony Orchestra, San Francisco Opera's Merola Opera Program, and the New National Theatre of Tokyo.

=== Teaching and pedagogy ===
Before his tenure at Michigan, Katz taught at the University of Maryland, College Park (1968–1969, 1978–1980), Westminster Choir College (1976–1983), and the Manhattan School of Music (1982–1984). Katz has taught collaborative piano at the University of Michigan School of Music, Theatre & Dance. Since 1983, he served as Chair of the Collaborative Piano Program and conducted 25 operatic productions for the University Opera Theatre. At Michigan, he was named the Artur Schnabel Collegiate Professor of Music in Piano, the Earl V. Moore Collegiate Professor of Music, and the Gwendolyn Koldofsky Distinguished University Professor of Music.

Internationally, Katz has conducted masterclasses and residencies at institutions including the Sibelius Academy, Songfest, the Juilliard School, Tanglewood Music Center, Rice University, the Tianjin Juilliard School, the Central Conservatory of Music in Beijing, and the Zhejiang Conservatory of Music.

He is the author of the book, The Complete Collaborator: The Pianist as Partner. A pedagogical guide addressing score reduction, vocal diction, phrasing, and partner dynamics.

== Awards and honors ==
- 1989: Outstanding Alumnus Award, University of Southern California.
- 1989: Harold Haugh Teaching Award, University of Michigan School of Music, Theatre & Dance.
- 1994: Honorary Doctorate, Westminster Choir College.
- 1998: Named "Accompanist of the Year" by Musical America.
- 2003: Honorary Doctorate, Shenandoah University.
- 2006: Honorary Doctorate, William Jewell College.
- 2011: Honorary Professor, Royal College of Music (Oslo, Norway).
- 2014: Distinguished Faculty Achievement Award, University of Michigan.
- 2015: Honorary Professor ("Docent"), Sibelius Academy. Becoming the first non-Scandinavian recipient of this award

== Select discography ==
- Songs and Canticles of Benjamin Britten, Desto Records,1972
- Marilyn Horne Sings Lieder, London Records, 1974
- Live from La Scala (with Marilyn Horne), Fonit Cetra, 1981
- Frederica von Stade: Song Recital, Columbia, 1978
- Frederica von Stade: Shéhérazade, Columbia, 1981
- Frederica von Stade Live!, Columbia, 1982
- Evelyn Lear Sings Bernstein, Philips, 1978
- España! (with José Carreras), PolyGram / Philips, 1985
- Plaisir d'amour'' (with Marilyn Horne)- Decca, 1994
- Marilyn Horne: Divas in Song, RCA Victor Red Seal, 1994
- Frederica von Stade: Voyage à Paris , RCA Victor Red Seal, 1995
