= Two Hebrew Songs =

1914 musical composition by Maurice Ravel

Deux mélodies hébraïques
- by Maurice Ravel
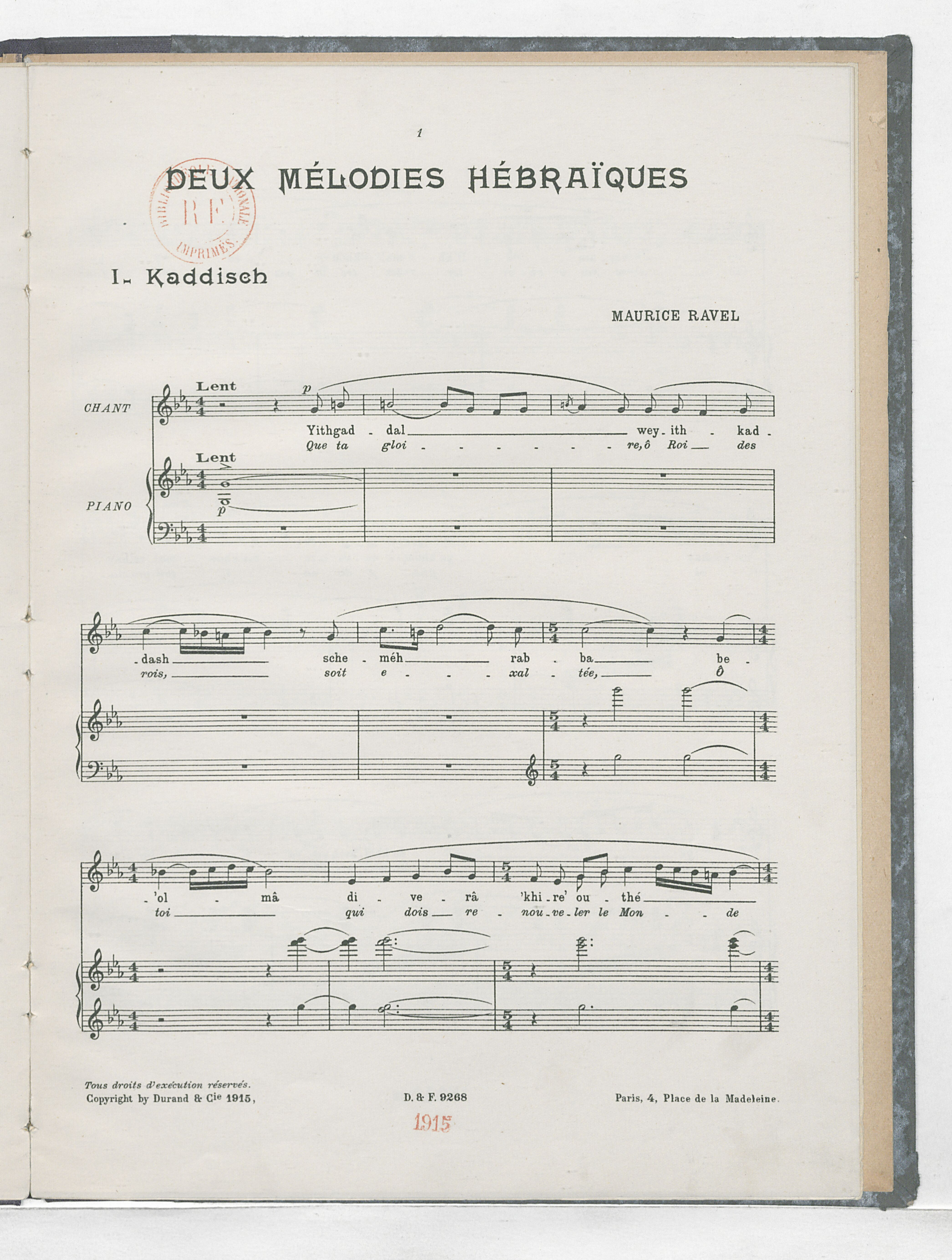
- First page
- English: Two Hebrew songs
- Key: C minor
- Catalogue: M. 22
- Composed: 1914 (piano); 1919 (orchestra)
- Dedication: Madame Alvina-Alvi
- Performed: June 3, 1914 (piano); April 17, 1920 (orchestra)
- Published: 1915 (piano); 1920 (orchestra)
- Scoring: voice; piano; voice; orchestra

Deux mélodies hébraïques ("Two Hebrew Songs") is a composition of two traditional Hebrew melodies for voice and piano by Maurice Ravel. It was composed in 1914.

== Structure ==
The first song is a setting of the Kaddish, the second is "L'énigme éternelle" ("The Eternal Enigma").

In line with the Five Popular Greek Melodies, the Two Hebrew Melodies were composed from traditional songs (words and melody) in 1914.

The piece consists of two songs:

1. Kaddisch — Slow, a long piece in Aramaic language
2. The Eternal Riddle — Tranquillo, a short piece in Yiddish language

The average combined length of the two songs in performance is about six minutes.

== History ==
The premier performance was on 3 June 1914 by the sponsor and dedicatee Alvina Alvi with Ravel at the piano, during a concert of the Independent Musical Society, Salle Malakoff.

In their vocal and piano version, the Two Melodies were also performed on May 15 of the same year by Ninon Vallin and Marcel Chadeigne at the Société Nationale de Musique, Salle du Conservatoire.

The work was published in 1915 by Durand.

== Analysis ==
Vladimir Jankélévitch considers the melodies "magnificent". As Marie-Claire Beltrando-Patier points out, Ravel succeeds in depicting "in a few measures an atmosphere which marvelously characterizes a climate or a place".

The first melody is a "fervent Kaddisch, prayer of the dead, which unrolls, in C minor, its pathetic cantilena on a G pedal" The second melody, "The Eternal Enigma" is "unhinged, anxious and a bit cynical [...] limps with all its dissonances and opposes to biblical hieraticism the plebeian awkwardness of its Yiddish jargon...".

In the catalog of Ravel's works compiled by Marcel Marnat, the work bears the number A 22.

== Discography ==
=== With piano ===
- Ravel: Complete Songs for Voice and Piano, CD 1, by Laurent Naouri (baritone) and David Abramovitz (piano), Naxos 8.554176-77, 2003.
- Ravel: Mélodies, CD, by Nora Gubisch, mezzo-soprano, and Alain Altinoglu, piano, Naïve (V5304), 2012.
- Ravel: Complete Mélodies, CD 2, by Christian Immler (baritone) and Filippo Farinelli (piano), Brilliant Classics 94743, 2015.
- Maurice Ravel: The Complete Works, CD 13, by José van Dam (bass) and Dalton Baldwin (piano), Warner Classics 0190295283261, 2020.

=== With orchestra ===
- Maurice Ravel: The Complete Works, CD 13, by Gérard Souzay (baritone), the Orchester de la Société des concerts du Conservatoire, André Vandernoot (dir.), Warner Classics 0190295283261, 2020.
