= Seiji Ozawa =

Japanese conductor (1935–2024)

- 小澤 征爾
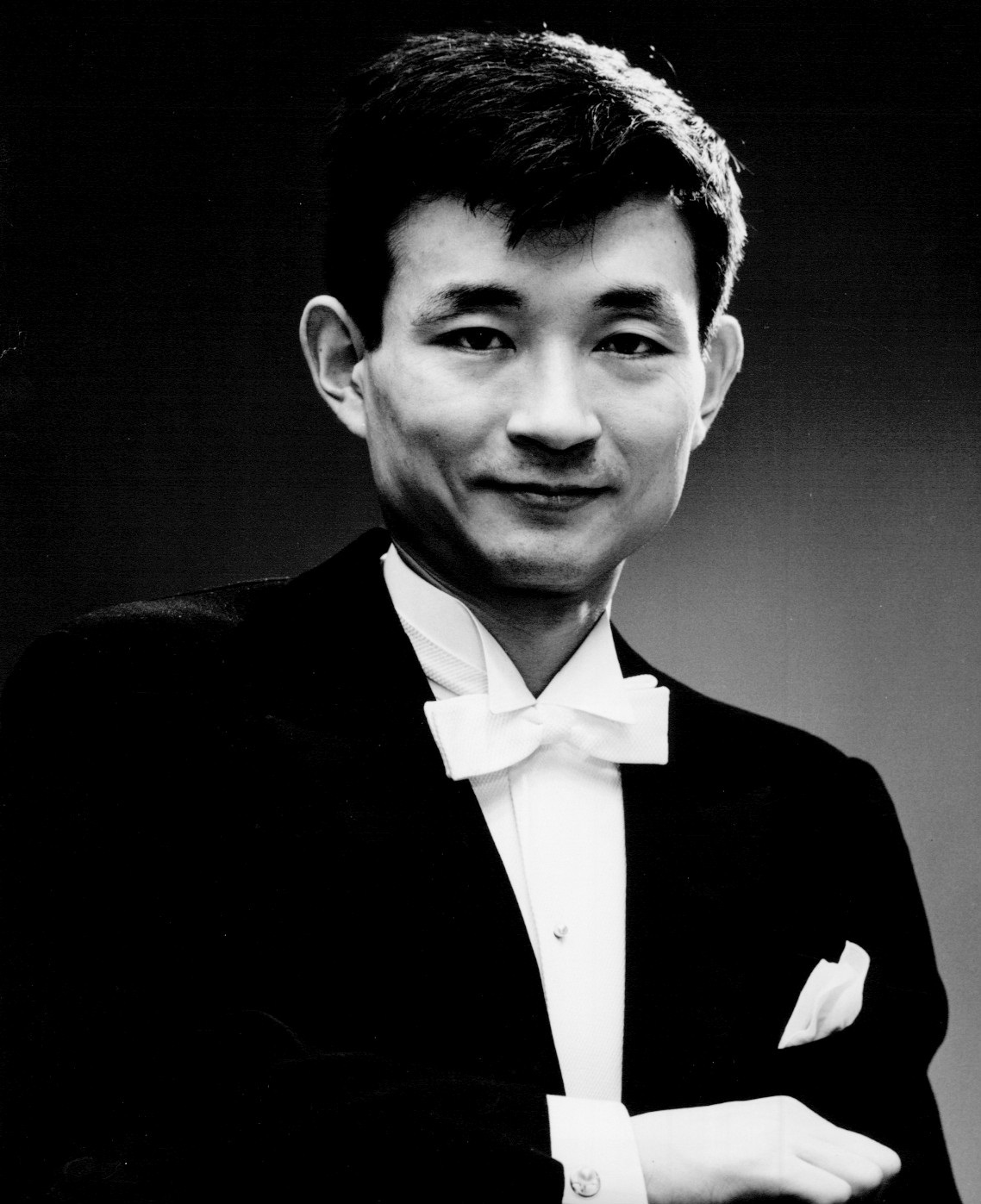
- Ozawa in 1963
- Born: September 1, 1935; Mukden, Fengtian, Manchukuo
- Died: February 6, 2024 (aged 88); Tokyo, Japan
- Occupation: Conductor
- Organizations: Chicago Symphony Orchestra; Toronto Symphony Orchestra; San Francisco Symphony; Boston Symphony Orchestra; Saito Kinen Orchestra; Vienna State Opera
- Spouses: Kyoko Edo (m. 1962; div. 1966); Miki Irie (m. 1968)
- Children: 2, including Yukiyoshi
- Awards: Koussevitzky Prize; Grammy Award; Suntory Music Award; Kennedy Center Honors

Seiji Ozawa (小澤 征爾, Ozawa Seiji; September 1, 1935 – February 6, 2024) was a Japanese conductor known internationally for his work as music director of the Toronto Symphony Orchestra, the San Francisco Symphony, and especially the Boston Symphony Orchestra (BSO), where he served from 1973 for 29 years. After conducting the Vienna New Year's Concert in 2002, he was director of the Vienna State Opera until 2010. In Japan, he founded the Saito Kinen Orchestra in 1984, their festival in 1992, and the Tokyo Opera Nomori in 2005.

Ozawa rose to fame after he won the 1959 Besançon competition. He was invited by Charles Munch, then the music director of the BSO, for the following year to Tanglewood, the orchestra's summer home, where he studied with Munch and Pierre Monteux. Winning the festival's Koussevitzky Prize earned him a scholarship with Herbert von Karajan and the Berlin Philharmonic and brought him to the attention of Leonard Bernstein, who made him his assistant with the New York Philharmonic in 1961. He became artistic director of the festival and education program in Tanglewood in 1970, together with Gunther Schuller. In 1994, the new main hall there was named after him.

During the cold war era Ozawa's "Concerts for Peace" at the United Nations General Assembly, the National Cathedral, and in the city of Hiroshima helped to raise public awareness about the risks associated with the proliferation of nuclear weapons.

Ozawa conducted world premieres such as György Ligeti's San Francisco Polyphony in 1975 and Olivier Messiaen's opera Saint François d'Assise in Paris in 1983. He received numerous international awards, and a Grammy for his recording of Ravel's L'enfant et les sortilèges . He joined Haruki Murakami for a series of conversations, Absolutely on Music. Ozawa was the first and most widely recognized Japanese conductor to attain a prominent international career.

== Life and career ==
=== Early years ===
Ozawa was born on September 1, 1935, to Japanese parents in the Japanese-occupied Manchurian city of Mukden, now known as Shenyang. He began piano lessons at age seven. His father was Kaisaku Ozawa, a pan-Asian supporter and co-founder of the Concordia Association; when Ozawa was born, his father chose his name by combining one character each from the names of Itagaki Seishiro and Ishiwara Kanji. When his family returned to Japan in 1944, he began studying piano with Noboru Toyomasu, with a focus on the works of Johann Sebastian Bach.

After graduating from the Seijo Junior High School in 1950, Ozawa broke two fingers in a rugby game. Hideo Saito, his teacher at the Toho Gakuen School of Music, brought him to a performance of Beethoven's Piano Concerto No. 5, ultimately shifting his musical focus from piano performance to conducting. He studied conducting and composition, achieving first prizes in both fields, and worked with the NHK Symphony Orchestra and the Japan Philharmonic while still a student. He graduated in 1957.

=== International success ===
Ozawa travelled to Europe for further studies; he supported himself by selling Japanese motor scooters. He achieved the first prize at the 1959 International Competition of Orchestra Conductors in Besançon, France, which made him known internationally; Charles Munch, then the music director of the Boston Symphony Orchestra, invited him to attend the Berkshire Music Center (now the Tanglewood Music Center) the following year to study with Munch and Pierre Monteux. Shortly after his arrival there, Ozawa won the Koussevitzky Prize for outstanding student conductor, Tanglewood's highest honor, which earned him a scholarship to study conducting with Herbert von Karajan.

Ozawa moved to West Berlin. Under the tutelage of Karajan, Ozawa caught the attention of Leonard Bernstein, who then appointed him as assistant conductor of the New York Philharmonic, where Ozawa served during the 1961–1962 and 1964–1965 seasons. He first conducted at Carnegie Hall in 1961 and first conducted the San Francisco Symphony in 1962. Ozawa remains the only conductor to have studied under both Karajan and Bernstein. In December 1962 Ozawa was involved in a controversy with the NHK Symphony Orchestra when some players, unhappy with his style and personality, refused to play under him. Ozawa went on to conduct the rival Japan Philharmonic Orchestra instead. In July 1963, Ozawa was in New York to appear as a guest conductor, and while there appeared on the American television program What's My Line?.

From 1964 until 1968, Ozawa served as the first music director of the Ravinia Festival, the summer home of the Chicago Symphony Orchestra. In 1969 he served as the festival's principal conductor. He conducted the Vienna Philharmonic first in 1966 at the Salzburg Festival.

==== Concerts for Peace ====
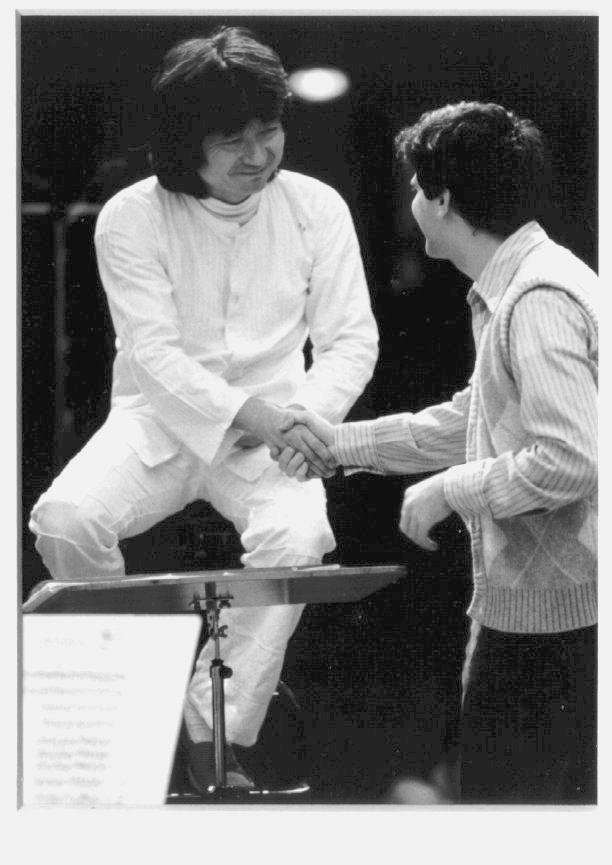
Ozawa with George Sakakeeny, New Japan Philharmonic

Taking a cue from his mentor Leonard Bernstein, Ozawa would also attain international recognition in the years to come by honoring the memory of innocent victims of warfare and raising public consciousness about the threat posed to international peace by nuclear weapons during the cold war era. Ozawa's older brother Toshiro noted that Seiji was deeply affected in his youth by stories concerning their paternal uncle Shizuka Ozawa, who served as a physician in the Japanese army during world War II while attending to patients overwhelmed by radiation sickness in Hiroshima in 1945. As a result of hearing his uncle's accounts, Ozawa felt the horror of nuclear war firsthand and was shocked to view photographic documentation during a visit to the Hiroshima Peace Memorial Museum with his mother Sakura in 1973.

Ozawa remained skeptical, however, of organized social and political movements which opposed the use of nuclear weapons and remained convinced that as an individual he could harness the power of music to transcend political boundaries in order to inspire the emergence of international peace more successfully. Ozawa summarized his philosophical perspective by noting

"I disagree that politics and music must live together...music must remain neutral in order to stay alive as an art."...One does not need to raise a lot of money to put on a concert in a large hall to express one's beliefs [in peace]."

With this in mind, he led several orchestras in multiple concerts dedicated to the memory of all victims of war. Included among them were the Toho Gakuen School of Music Orchestra at Hiroshima's Yubin-chokin Hall (1973), the New Japan Philharmonic during the annual United Nations Day Concert at the General Assembly Hall in New York City (1974), the Saxon State Orchestra Dresden in a performance of Krzysztof Penderecki's Threnody to the Victims of Hiroshima at the Salzburg Music Festival (1976), and the Seiji Ozawa Music Academy Orchestra and a 440 member choir in a performance of Faure's Requiem at the Hiroshima Green Arena commemorating the 60th anniversary of the atomic bombing (2005).

During the course of several decades Ozawa returned to the cities of Hiroshima and Nagasaki on multiple occasions and conducted over ten "Concerts for Peace". These showcased performances by the San Francisco Symphony (1975) and the Boston Symphony Orchestra (1978). His collaboration with the New Japan Philharmonic in 1982 was noteworthy for a performance of Beethoven's Symphony No. 9 "Choral" and featured a chorus of over two hundred thirty members of the general public. Years later, Ozawa also led the New Japan Philharmonic at the Urakami Cathedral in Nagasaki to commemorate the fiftieth anniversary of the atomic bombing of that city (1995).It featured a performance of Mahler's Symphony No. 2 "Resurrection Symphony" and was recorded live on HDTV videotape by NHK Nagasaki in an effort to educate future generations. On the sixtieth anniversary of the atomic bombings, he also led his Seiji Ozawa Music Academy Orchestra in a performance of Faure's Requiem in collaboration with a civic chorus of over four hundred voices including young vocalists from both China and the United States, for an audience of over 8,000 in Hiroshima's Prefectural Gymnasium (2005).

=== Toronto Symphony Orchestra ===
External audio
- Seiji Ozawa conducts the Chicago Symphony Orchestra in Modest Mussorgsky's "Pictures At An Exhibition"and Benjamin Britten's "The Young Persons Guide to the Orchestra" in 1968; Here on archive.org

In his first post as music director, Ozawa led the Toronto Symphony Orchestra (TSO) from 1965 to 1969. Basically every work on the programs, such as the symphonies by Beethoven, Tchaikovsky and Mahler were new for him, and he described the audience as patient and supportive in a later interview. Concerts were held at the Massey Hall; they played for the opening of the new Toronto City Hall in 1965, for the Commonwealth Arts Festival in Glasgow and the Expo 67 in Montreal.

Ozawa made notable recordings with the TSO, including the Symphonie fantastique by Berlioz in 1966, a highly lauded recording by music critics. In honor of the Canadian Centennial celebrations in 1967 they also joined forces with CBS Masterworks Records and the producer Thomas Z. Shepard to showcase the works of several leading contemporary Canadian composers including: Harry Freedman, Ernest MacMillan and Pierre Mercure (Canadian Music in the Twentieth Century, # 32 11 0038).

In 1967, Ozawa and the Toronto Symphony Orchestra recorded Messiaen's Turangalîla-Symphonie that Koussevitzky had commissioned and Bernstein first conducted with the BSO. In Ozawa's version, the first in North America, Yvonne Loriod was the pianist as in the premiere. The recording was nominated for a Grammy Award. When it was reissued on CD in 2004, a reviewer noted: "The orgiastic fifth and 10th movements still pack quite a punch, and in a very real sense, while many more modern versions have come and gone this one still holds its own with the best of them." The composer would entrust Ozawa with the premiere of his opera Saint François d'Assise in Paris in 1983.

=== San Francisco Symphony ===
Ozawa was music director of the San Francisco Symphony from 1970 to 1976. In San Francisco, he combined Bernstein's charismatic style with the flower power of the west coast, wearing long hair and flowery shirts, and sometimes conducting cross-over programs. In 1972, he led the San Francisco Symphony in its first commercial recordings in a decade, recording music inspired by Shakespeare's Romeo and Juliet. In 1973, he took the San Francisco Symphony on a European tour, which included a Paris concert that was broadcast via satellite in stereo to San Francisco station KKHI.

He was involved in a 1974 dispute with the San Francisco Symphony's players' committee that denied tenure to the timpanist Elayne Jones and the bassoonist Ryohei Nakagawa, two young musicians Ozawa had selected. He was committed to contemporary music then, for example commissioning San Francisco Polyphony from György Ligeti in 1975. During the time, he impressed by "the brilliance of his interpretations, with his supreme command of the most intimidatingly complex scores and as a graceful, even glamorous stage performer".

=== Boston Symphony Orchestra ===
External audio
- Ozawa conducting Beethoven's Choral Fantasy with Rudolf Serkin and the Boston Symphony Orchestra (BSO) & Tanglewood Festival Chorus in 1982 archive.org
- Ozawa conducting Beethoven's Piano Concerto No. 3 with Rudolf Serkin and the BSO in 1984 archive.org

In 1970, Ozawa and Gunther Schuller became artistic directors of the Berkshire Music Festival in Tanglewood, the summer home of the Boston Symphony Orchestra (BSO). Ozawa became music director of the BSO in 1973. He remained in that position for 29 years, the longest tenure of any music director there, surpassing the 25 years held by Serge Koussevitzky. He conducted more world premieres, including works by Ligeti and Tōru Takemitsu.

Ozawa won his first Emmy Award in 1976, for the BSO's PBS television series, Evening at Symphony; in 1994, he was awarded his second Emmy for Individual Achievement in Cultural Programming for Dvořák in Prague: A Celebration. He played a key role as a teacher and administrator at the Tanglewood Music Center, the Boston Symphony Orchestra's summer music home that has programs for young professionals and high school students. In 1994, the BSO dedicated its new Tanglewood concert hall "Seiji Ozawa Hall" in honor of his 20th season with the orchestra. In recognition of his impact on the BSO, Ozawa was named music director laureate.

On 24 October, 1974, Ozawa conducted a Japanese combined orchestra which included the Toho Gakuen School of Music Orchestra and members of the Japan Philharmonic Orchestra with solo cellist Tsuyoshi Tsutsumi and solo violist Nobuko Imai in a world-wide telecast (carried on the PBS television network in the United States) from the United Nations building in New York City. The concert included a work by Beethoven and Strauss's Don Quixote with the two Japanese soloists.

In December 1979, Ozawa conducted a performance of Beethoven's Ninth Symphony with the Beijing Symphony Orchestra. This was the first time since 1961 that the symphony was performed live in the People's Republic of China due to a ban on Western music. In 1983 he collaborated at the Paris Opera with José van Dam and Christiane Eda-Pierre in the premiere of Olivier Messiaen's opera Saint François d'Assise.

Ozawa gave notable performances of music of his countryman Tōru Takemitsu, including "Orion and Pleiades" for cello and orchestra. In October 1990 he performed it with cellist Tsuyoshi Tsutsumi and the Boston Symphony Orchestra in honour of Takemitsu's 60th birthday.

Ozawa made his debut with the Metropolitan Opera in New York City in 1992, conducting Tchaikovsky's Eugene Onegin, in a cast with Mirella Freni as Tatyana. He returned to the house in 2008 with The Queen of Spades, both productions described as passionate and electrifying.

Ozawa created a controversy in 1996–1997 with sudden demands for change at the Tanglewood Music Center, arguing that the organization had become too clubby, which made Gilbert Kalish and Leon Fleisher resign in protest. Subsequent criticism by Greg Sandow generated controversy in the press.

Ozawa used an unorthodox conducting wardrobe, wearing the traditional formal dress with a white turtleneck instead of the usual starched shirt, waistcoat, and white tie.

=== Saito Kinen Orchestra ===
In an effort to merge all-Japanese orchestras and performers with international artists, Ozawa, along with Kazuyoshi Akiyama, founded the Saito Kinen Orchestra in 1984, named after his teacher. Since its creation, the orchestra has gained a prominent position in the international music community, establishing a festival in Matsumoto in 1992, later named the Seiji Ozawa Matsumoto Festival. A 2013 recording from the festival of Ravel's L'enfant et les sortilèges earned Ozawa his only Grammy Award in 2016, for best opera recording.

In 1998, Ozawa conducted a simultaneous international performance of Beethoven's Ode to Joy at the opening ceremony of the 1998 Winter Olympics in Nagano, Japan. Ozawa conducted an orchestra and singers in Nagano, and was joined by choruses singing from Beijing, Berlin, Cape Town, New York City, and Sydney – as well as the crowd in the Nagano Olympic Stadium. This was the first time a simultaneous international audio-visual performance had been achieved.

=== Vienna State Opera ===
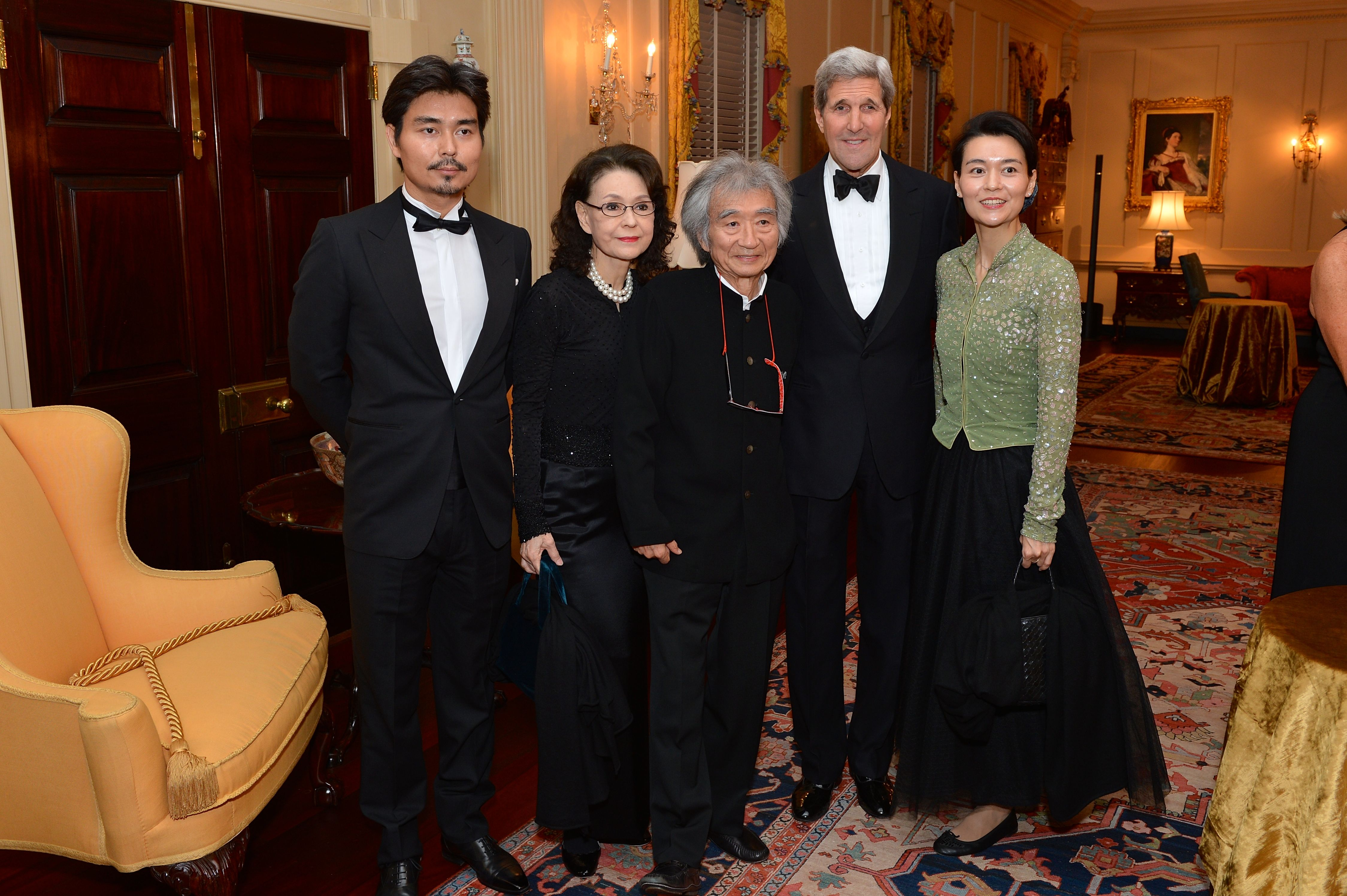
Ozawa (center) and his family with US secretary of state John Kerry at the 2015 Kennedy Centers Honor dinner in Washington, D.C.

On New Year's Day 2002, Ozawa conducted the Vienna New Year's Concert, the first Japanese in a long tradition. In 2002, he stepped down from the BSO music directorship to become principal conductor of the Vienna State Opera. He had conducted at the house before, Verdi's Ernani and Tchaikovsky's Eugene Onegin in 1988, Pique Dame in 1992 and Verdi's Falstaff in 1993, and began his tenure with productions of Janáček's Jenůfa and Krenek's Jonny spielt auf.

In 2005, he founded Tokyo Opera Nomori and conducted its production of Richard Strauss's Elektra. On February 1, 2006, the Vienna State Opera announced that he had to cancel all his 2006 conducting engagements because of illness, including pneumonia and shingles. He returned to conducting in March 2007 at the Tokyo Opera Nomori. Ozawa stepped down from his post at the Vienna State Opera in 2010, to be succeeded by Franz Welser-Möst. He was named an honorary member of the Vienna Philharmonic then. In 2021, he conducted the orchestra a last time, on a Japan tour featuring the slow movement from Mozart's Divertimento, K. 136.

=== Personal life ===
External videos
- Seiji Ozawa is interviewed by Charlie Rose on PBS in 1999 Here on archive.org

Ozawa had three brothers, Katsumi, Toshio, and Mikio, the latter becoming a music writer and radio host in Tokyo. Ozawa's first wife was the pianist Kyoko Edo. His second wife was Miki Irie ("Vera"), a Russian-Japanese former model and actress (born in 1944 in Yokohama). He was married to her from 1968 until his death in 2024. The couple had two children, a daughter named Seira and a son named Yukiyoshi. During his tenure with the Boston Symphony Orchestra, Ozawa opted to divide his time between Boston and Tokyo rather than move his family to the United States as he and his wife wanted their children to grow up aware of their Japanese heritage.

Ozawa and the cellist and conductor Mstislav Rostropovich formed a traveling musical group during the later stages of Rostropovich's life, with the goal of giving free concerts and mentoring students across Japan.

==== Illness and death ====
On January 7, 2010, Ozawa announced that he was canceling all engagements for six months in order to undergo treatments for esophageal cancer. The doctor with Ozawa at the time of the announcement said it was detected at an early stage. Ozawa's other health problems included pneumonia and lower back problems requiring surgery in 2011. Following his cancer diagnosis, Ozawa and the novelist Haruki Murakami embarked on a series of six conversations about classical music that form the basis for the book Absolutely on Music.

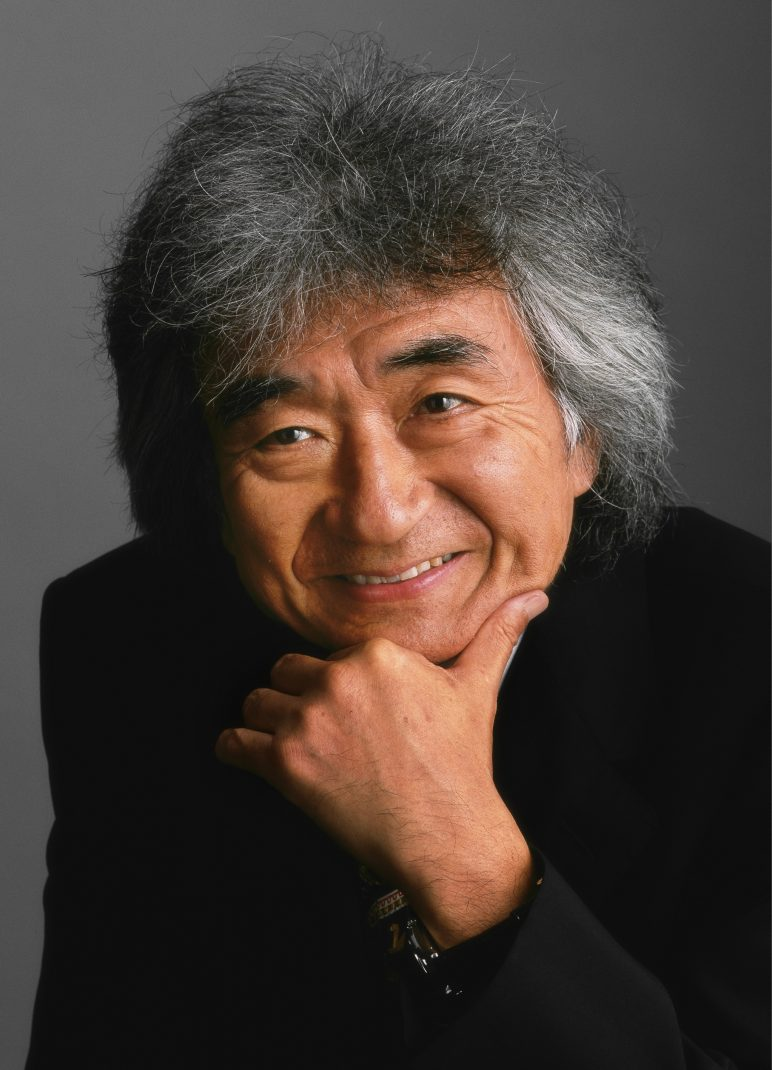
Seiji Ozawa Candidate for membership in the Japan Art Academy

His last concert took place on November 22, 2022, with the Saito Kinen Orchestra where he conducted, in a wheelchair, Beethoven's 'Egmont' Overture, which was broadcast live to Koichi Wakata, an astronaut onboard the International Space Station.

Ozawa died of heart failure at his home in Tokyo, on February 6, 2024, at the age of 88.

Daniel Froschauer, speaking for the Vienna Philharmonic, wrote: "We are happy to have experienced so many artistic highlights with Seiji Ozawa. It was a gift to be able to go on a long journey with this artist, who was characterized by the highest musical standards and at the same time humility towards the treasures of musical culture as well as his loving interaction with his colleagues and his charisma, which was also felt by the audience."

His obituary in The New York Times noted: "In the waning years of his life, Mr. Ozawa came to recognize the wisdom that comes from years of music making. 'A musician's special flavor comes out with age,' he told [Haruki] Murakami in the 2016 book of conversations. 'His playing at that stage may have more interesting qualities than at the height of his career.'"

== Honorary degrees ==
Ozawa held honorary doctorate degrees from the Sorbonne University, Harvard University, the New England Conservatory of Music, the University of Massachusetts Amherst, National University of Music Bucharest, and Wheaton College. He was a Member of Honour of the International Music Council.

== Awards and honors ==
- 1959: International Competition of Orchestra Conductors, Besançon, France
- 1960: Koussevitzky Prize for Outstanding Student Conductor, Tanglewood
- 1976: Emmy Award for Evening at Symphony
- 1992: Hans von Bülow Medal (given by the Berlin Philharmonic)
- 1994: Emmy for Dvořák in Prague
- 1994: Inouye Award, Japan
- 1994: Inauguration of Seiji Ozawa Hall at Tanglewood, the BSO's summer home in Massachusetts, where he also taught for the International Academy of Young Musicians
- 1997: Musician of the Year (Musical America)
- 1998: Chevalier of the Légion d'honneur (France), for the promotion of French composers
- 2001: Member of the Académie des Beaux-Arts of the Institut de France (Given by French president Jacques Chirac)
- 2001: Person of Cultural Merit, Japan
- 2002: Doctor honoris causa, National University of Music Bucharest, Romania
- 2002: Austrian Cross of Honour for Science and Art, 1st class (Given by Austrian president Thomas Klestil)
- 2002: Les Victoires de la Musique Classique (French CD prize)
- 2002: 34th Suntory Music Award (2002)
- 2003: Mainichi Art Award and Suntory Music Prize
- 2008: Order of Culture, Japan
- 2009: Grand Decoration of Honour in Silver for Services to the Republic of Austria
- 2011: Praemium Imperiale, Japan
- 2012: Tanglewood Medal awarded, In Honor Of Tanglewood 75th Season, BSO begins new tradition with first-ever medal awarded to Seiji Ozawa, BSO Music Director Laureate, Tanglewood
- 2015: Kennedy Center Honoree
- 2016: Grammy Award for Best Opera Recording
- 2016: Honorary Member of the Berlin Philharmonic

== Discography ==
External audio
- Ozawa conducting Tchaikovsky's The Queen of Spades with Vladimir Atlantov, Mirella Freni and the Boston Symphony Orchestra (BSO) in 1992 archive.org

- Bartók:
  - The Miraculous Mandarin, Op. 19, Sz. 73 (suite); Music for Strings, Percussion and Celesta. BSO, 1977 – DG
  - The Miraculous Mandarin, Concerto for Orchestra. BSO, 1994 – Philips
  - Music for Strings, Percussion and Celesta; Viola Concerto. Berlin Philharmonic, 1992, 1989 – DG
- Berg: Violin Concerto. Itzhak Perlman (violin), BSO, 1980 - DGG
- Berlioz:
  - Symphonie fantastique. TSO, 1966 – RCA / BSO, 1973 – DG
  - Roméo et Juliette. BSO, 1976 – DG
  - Grande Messe des Morts. BSO, 1993 – RCA
  - La damnation de Faust. Tanglewood Festival Chorus, BSO, Edith Mathis, Stuart Burrows, Donald McIntyre, 1974 – DG
  - Nuits d'été. BSO, Frederica von Stade, 1984 – Sony
- Brahms: Symphony No. 1. BSO, 1977 – DG
- Debussy: La damoiselle élue, Tanglewood Festival Chorus, BSO, Susanne Mentzer, Frederica von Stade, 1984 – Sony
- Dutilleux: The Shadows of Time. BSO, 1998 – Erato
- Dvořák:
  - Dvořák in Prague: A Celebration. Prague Philharmonic Chorus, BSO, Rudolf Firkušný, Yo-Yo Ma, Itzhak Perlman, Frederica von Stade, 1994 – Sony, and 2007 – Kultur Video
  - Cello Concerto in B minor. Mstislav Rostropovich, BSO, 1987 – Erato
- Falla: El sombrero de tres picos. BSO, Teresa Berganza, 1977 – DG
- Franck: Symphony in D minor. BSO, 1993 – DG
- Gounod: Faust. Alberto Cupido, Rosalind Plowright, Simon Estes, Juan Pons, Chœurs de Radio France, Orchestre National de France, 1989 - DG
- Ives: Symphony No. 4; Central Park in the Dark. BSO, 1976 – DG
- Lalo: Symphonie espagnole. Anne-Sophie Mutter, violin, Orchestre National de France, 1984 – EMI
- Liszt: Piano Concertos Nos. 1 & 2, Totentanz. Krystian Zimerman, piano. BSO, 1987 – DG
- Mahler:
  - Symphony No. 1; Blumine. BSO, 1977 – DG
  - Symphony No. 8. BSO, Tanglewood Festival Chorus, 1981 – Philips
  - Symphony No. 9. Saito Kinen Orchestra. Recorded in Tokyo January 2–4, 2001. Sony.
- Mendelssohn: A Midsummer Night's Dream. Tanglewood Festival Chorus, BSO, Kathleen Battle, Judi Dench, Frederica von Stade, 1994 – DG
- Messiaen: Turangalîla-Symphonie. TSO, Yvonne Loriod, 1967 – RCA
- Orff: Carmina Burana. New England Conservatory Chorus, BSO, Evelyn Mandac, Stanley Kolk, Sherrill Milnes, 1970 – RCA
- Panufnik: Sinfonia Votiva (Symphony No. 8). BSO, 1982 – Hyperion
- Poulenc
  - Concerto for Organ, strings and Timpani. BSO, Simon Preston, 1993 – DG
  - Gloria; Stabat Mater. Kathleen Battle, BSO, 1987 – DG
- Prokofiev:
  - Piano Concerto No. 2, Yundi, piano. Berlin Philharmonic, 2007 – DG
  - Symphonie Concertante. Mstislav Rostropovich, LSO, 1987 – Erato
  - Symphonies. Berlin Philharmonic, 1989–1992 – DG
- Ravel:
  - Shéhérazade. BSO, Frederica von Stade, 1981 – Sony
  - Boléro; Rhapsodie espagnole; Valses nobles et sentimentales; Ma mère l'Oye; Menuet antique; Le Tombeau de Couperin; La valse; Alborada del gracioso; Miroirs; Pavane pour une infante défunte; Daphnis et Chloé. BSO, 1974–1975 – DG
  - Piano Concerto in G. Yundi, Berlin Philharmonic Orchestra, 2007 – DG
- Respighi:
  - Ancient Airs and Dances, 1979 – DG
  - Roman Festivals; Fountains of Rome; Pines of Rome. BSO, 1978 – DG
- Russo: Three Pieces for Blues Band and Symphony Orchestra; San Francisco Symphony, 1972 – DG
- Saint-Saens: Symphony No. 3; Phaeton; Le Rouet d'Omphale. Philippe Lefebvre, organ. National Orchestra of France, 1986 – EMI
- Sarasate: Zigeunerweisen. Anne-Sophie Mutter, National Orchestra of France, 1984 – EMI
- Schönberg: Gurre-Lieder. Jessye Norman, James McCracken et al. Tanglewood Festival Chorus, BSO, live 1979 - Philips
- Sessions: Concerto for Orchestra. BSO, 1982 – Hyperion
- Shostakovich: Cello Concerto No. 1. Rostropovich, LSO, 1987 – Erato
- Stravinsky:
  - Oedipus rex. Peter Schreier, Jessye Norman, Jocasta. Saito Kinen Orchestra, 1992 – Philips
  - Suites from The Firebird; Petrouchka. BSO, 1970 – RCA
  - The Firebird (1910 version). Orchestre de Paris, 1973 – EMI
  - The Rite of Spring. Chicago Symphony Orchestra, 1968 – RCA
  - Violin Concerto. Itzhak Perlman (violin), BSO, 1980 - DGG
- Takemitsu:
  - Quatrain (with Tashi); A Flock Descends into the Pentagonal Garden. BSO, 1980 – DG
  - Asterism for piano and orchestra, Requiem for string orchestra, Green for orchestra (November Steps II), and The Dorian Horizon for 17 strings. TSO, 1969 – RCA
- Tchaikovsky:
  - Symphony No. 4, Berlin Philharmonic, 1989 – DG 427 354–4 (cassette)
  - Symphony No. 5. BSO, 1977 – DG
  - Symphonie No. 6. BSO, 1986 – Erato
  - Variations on a Rococo Theme. BSO, 1987 – Erato
- Vivaldi: The Four Seasons. BSO, 1982 – Telarc

== Bibliography ==
- Seiji: An Intimate Portrait of Seiji Ozawa (Hardcover) by Lincoln Russell (photographer), Caroline Smedvig (editor), 1998, ISBN 978-0-395-93943-7
- Ozawa. Mayseles brothers film. CBS/Sony, 1989. A documentary film co-produced by Peter Gelb.
- Absolutely on Music: Conversations with Seiji Ozawa by Haruki Murakami (New York: Knopf, 2016) ISBN 978-0-385-35435-6

== Archives ==
Documents related to Seiji Ozawa's conducting career have been archived within several institutional collections including:

- The Chicago Symphony Orchestra Rosenthal Archives hosts a collection of recordings and photographs of Seiji Ozawa's early tenure as music director of the Chicago Symphony Orchestra at its Ravinia Festival (1964–1968).
- The City of Toronto Archive hosts a collection of correspondence, contract, news clippings, promotional materials, and programs related to Seiji Ozawa's tenure as music director of the Toronto Symphony Orchestra (1965–1969).
- The Boston Symphony Orchestra Archives hosts a collection of conducting schedules, performance tapes, and programs related to Seiji Ozawa's tenure as music director of the Boston Symphony Orchestra (1973–2002).

Cultural offices
Preceded by William Steinberg	Music Director, Boston Symphony Orchestra; 1973–2002	Succeeded by James Levine
Preceded by Claudio Abbado	Music Director, Vienna State Opera; 2002–2010	Succeeded by Franz Welser-Möst
