= L'Ange de Nisida =

Opera in four acts by Italian composer Gaetano Donizetti

- Opera semiseria by Gaetano Donizetti
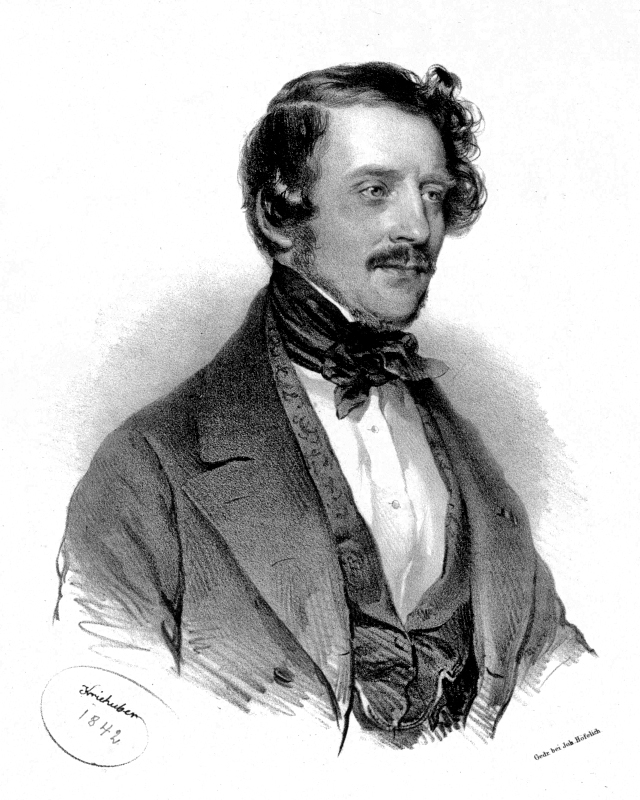
- Gaetano Donizetti, 1842 portrait
- Translation: The Angel of Nisida
- Librettist: Alphonse Royer; Gustave Vaëz
- Language: French

L'Ange de Nisida (The Angel of Nisida) is an opera semiseria in four acts by Italian composer Gaetano Donizetti, from a French-language libretto by Alphonse Royer and Gustave Vaëz.

Parts of the libretto are considered analogous with the libretto for Giovanni Pacini's Adelaide e Comingio, and the final scene is based on the François-Thomas-Marie de Baculard d'Arnaud play Les Amants malheureux, ou le comte de Comminges. Donizetti worked on the opera in late 1839—its final page is dated 27 December 1839. Because the subject matter involved the mistress of a Neapolitan king, and may thus have caused difficulties with the Italian censors, Donizetti decided that the opera should be presented in France. The theater company Donizetti contracted went bankrupt; the opera was reworked as La favorite in September 1840. L'Ange finally received its premiere in its original form in 2018 in a concert performance at London's Royal Opera House.

== Composition history ==
=== Sources ===
L'Ange de Nisida incorporated many of the manuscript pages from Adelaide, an unfinished score that Italian composer Gaetano Donizetti was probably working on in 1834, from a libretto of unknown origin. This libretto contained elements from the 1790 Parisian play Les Amants malheureux, ou le comte de Comminges by François-Thomas-Marie de Baculard d'Arnaud. In his book Donizetti and his Operas, musicologist William Ashbrook states that the Adelaide libretto has similarities to that of the Giovanni Pacini opera Adelaide e Comingio, whose libretto was written by Gaetano Rossi. Donizetti is believed to have taken the manuscript for Adelaide to Paris in 1838. Because the subject matter of L'Ange involved the mistress of a Neapolitan king, and may thus have caused difficulties with the Italian censors, Donizetti decided that the opera should be presented in France. Additionally, in September 1839, the French press had announced La Fiancée du Tyrol, a translation of Donizetti's 1833 opera Il furioso all'isola di San Domingo. In October 1839, he wrote to a friend in Naples: "La Fiancée du Tyrol will be Il furioso amplified, L'ange de Nisida will be new." Donizetti began work on L'Ange shortly thereafter; La Fiancée du Tyrol never materialized.

=== Composition ===
Donizetti completed L'Ange de Nisida on 27 December 1839, the date on the final page of the autograph score. He had been working on Le duc d'Albe, but postponed work on the half-completed score in favor of L'Ange and La fille du régiment.

Although Donizetti noted in correspondence to his close friend Tommaso Persico in Naples that L'Ange was "an opera in three acts", both the autograph score and Donizetti's contract with Anténor Joly, the owner of the theater company Donizetti contracted, make clear that L'Ange had four acts. Regardless, Donizetti's letter has caused confusion among opera journalists and scholars. For example, The Musical Times journalist Winton Dean wrote of the Italian version of La favorite in 1979: "[I]t was expanded from an unperformed three-act French opera, L'Ange de Nisida." Ashbrook speculates that Donizetti may have considered the first two acts as one.

=== Contract and cancellation ===
On 5 January 1840, Donizetti signed a rehearsal and performance contract with his librettists and Anténor Joly, who was operating a company named Théâtre de la Renaissance and giving performances at the Salle Ventadour in Paris. Théâtre de la Renaissance chose L'Ange over Richard Wagner's Das Liebesverbot. Joly's company had premiered the French version of Donizetti's Lucia di Lammermoor the previous year, and L'Ange was meant to be its successor. The contract, which is on display at the Bibliothèque-Musée de l'Opéra National de Paris, stipulates that L'Ange be performed uninterrupted twenty times unless three consecutive performances sold poorly, and that Joly could not premiere any other opera until the revenue from L'Ange started to decline. The contract contains nothing about Donizetti's compensation; therefore, it is possible that another contract existed. L'Ange was set to begin rehearsal on 1 February 1840. Donizetti had two other operas in various stages of preparation at other theaters during this time: Les martyrs and La fille du régiment.

Later in January, Joly terminated all opera productions of the Théâtre de la Renaissance company due to financial hardship, despite a reported 5,000-franc loan from Donizetti. Joly tried to keep the operation afloat by staging ballets, but it closed completely in May 1840. He filed for bankruptcy and therefore avoided paying Donizetti the large fee owed for backing out of the production. Writing for the Cambridge Opera Journal, Mark Everist referred to L'Ange as one of "the most spectacular casualties of the collapse of music drama at the Théâtre de la Renaissance".

=== Reworked as La favorite ===
Donizetti managed to retrieve the score of L'Ange de Nisida from Joly's company and reworked it as La favorite (now more commonly known by its Italian title, La favorita) in September 1840 for a December premiere in Italy. To circumvent the Italian censors Donizetti agreed to plot modifications; La favorite is about a medieval King of Castile.

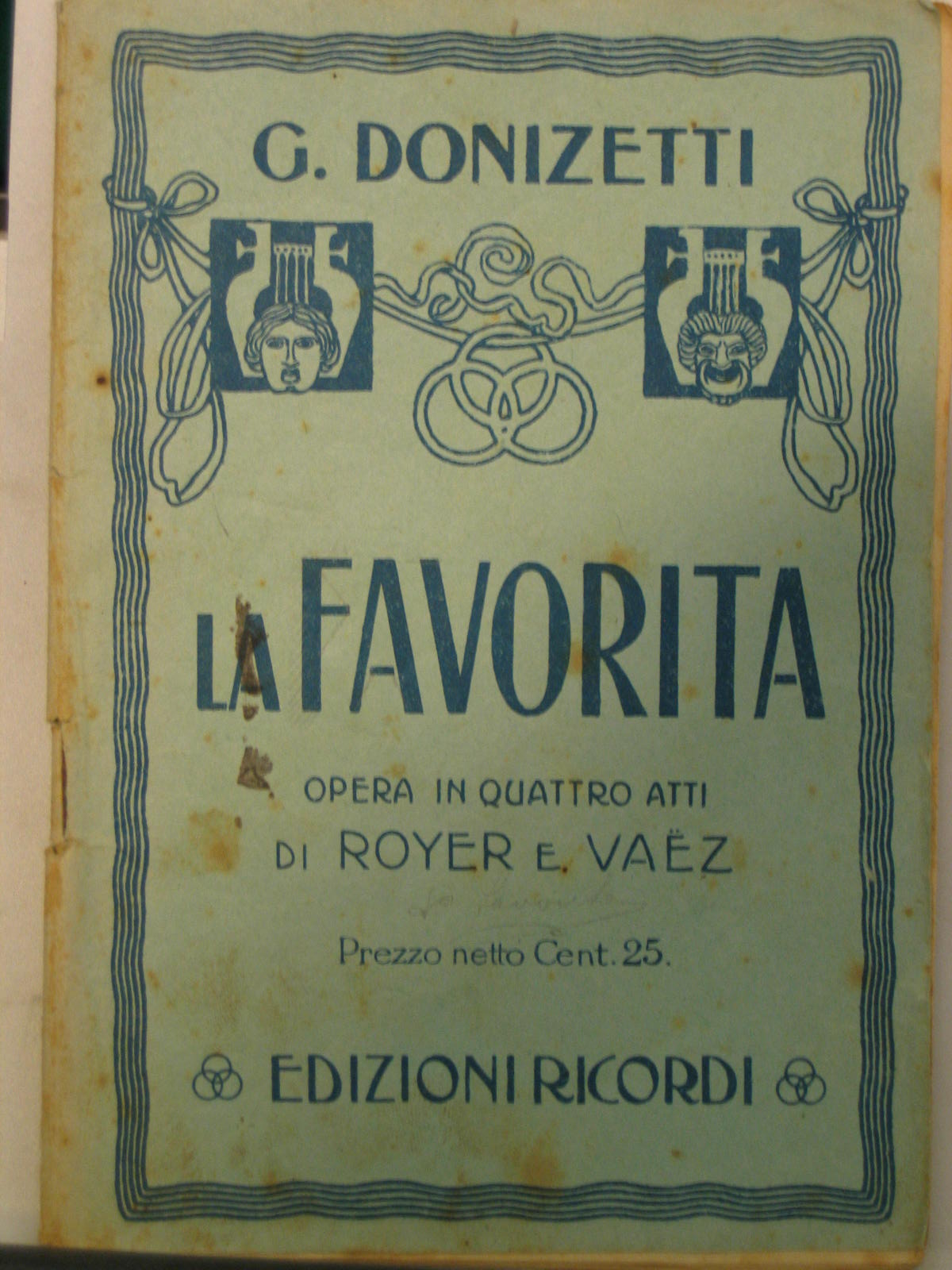
A souvenir libretto from La favorita

The presence and influence of L'Ange is evident in Donizetti's autograph score of La favorite, which features "large chunks cut up and interleaved" in which new character names and text for La favorite overwrite the old. The final page was used as the final page of La favorite; therefore, both operas bear the same finish date on the last page. Donizetti's contract for La favorite demanded a 1 December 1840 premiere, leaving him little time for dramatic changes. In his 1965 biography Donizetti, Ashbrook surmises that this tight deadline gave rise to the legend that Donizetti actually composed the last act of La favorite in a single night. In fact, the libretto of L'Ange and the autograph score of La favorite make clear that the final act of La favorite was completed long before Donizetti began the rest of it in September—Donizetti lifted it from L'Ange with the exception of two solo passages. He brought in librettist Eugène Scribe to oversee the new text, which also required the approval of starring mezzo-soprano Rosine Stoltz. The finished product was an amalgamation of the unfinished Adelaide, the never-performed L'Ange de Nisida, and new material worked into the score by Donizetti and into the libretto by Scribe. La favorite premiered on 2 December 1840.

Ashbrook has compared the surviving autograph scores of L'Ange de Nisida and La favorite to determine precisely how much material it provided for the latter. While the events in L'Ange are set in 1470 in Nisida and Naples, La favorite is set in Santiago de Compostela and Castile, both in Spain, prior to 1350. Donizetti made fundamental changes to the first half of La favorite and little remains of L'Ange. (Note: Donizetti did take a line from the opening of L'Ange, "Douce ange, une fée inconnue", ("Sweet angel, a fairy unknown") and place it in the first scene of La favorite with different music but almost identical text.) The central conflict of the story involving the marriage and subsequent death is essentially the same from one opera to the other, and some of the character names are also similar or identical.

A transcription of the libretto is kept at the Fondazione Donizetti library in Bergamo, and was printed in a 2002 issue of the Italian-language journal for The Donizetti Society.

== 2018 premiere ==
L'Ange de Nisida received its world premiere on 18 July 2018 in a concert performance at the Royal Opera House in London, in association with Opera Rara. The performance was conducted by Mark Elder with the title role sung by Joyce El-Khoury. The score was reconstructed over a period of eight years by musicologist Candida Mantica from pages discovered in the Bibliothèque nationale de France which were scattered in 18 different folders as well as archive research in both Europe and the US. She eventually identified approximately 470 pages of the L'Ange de Nisida score written in Donizetti's hand.

== Roles ==
As the opera never got to the rehearsal stage, little is known about the intended cast. In a letter to his close friend Tommaso Persico, Donizetti expressed his desire to give the title role to Juliette Bourgeois, a temperamental soprano who requested a large sum of money to perform in France. (She was later to create the title role in Donizetti's La fille du régiment)

Roles, voice types, Corresponding role in La favorite
Role	Voice type	Corresponding role in La favorite
Don Fernand d'Aragon, King of Naples	baritone	Alphonse XI of Castile
Don Gaspar, chamberlain of the King	basso buffo	Don Gaspar
Countess Sylvia de Linares	soprano	Léonor
Leone de Casaldi, a soldier	tenor	Fernand, a novice
The Monk	bass	Balthasar

== Synopsis ==
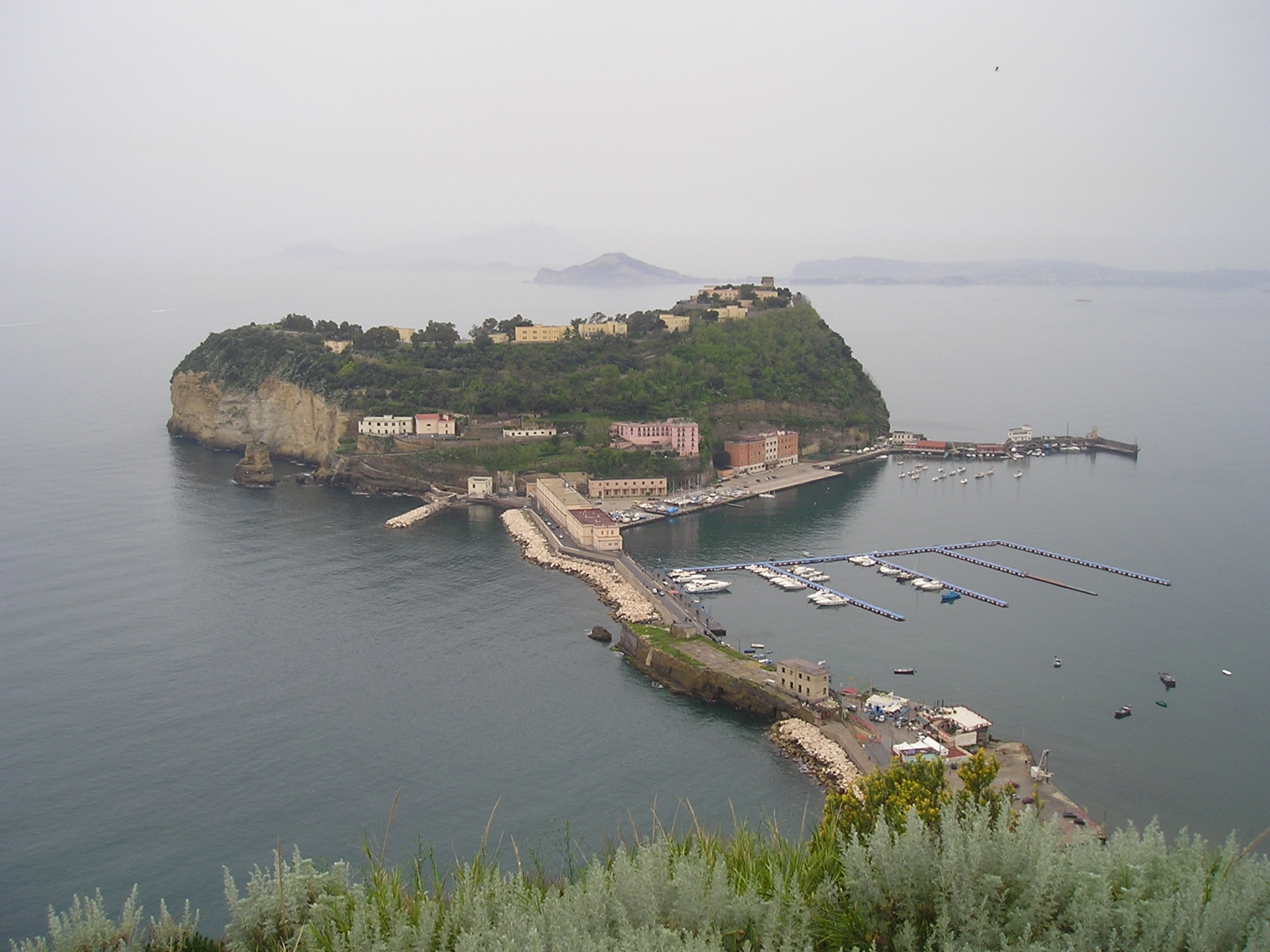
A view of Nisida

Time: 1470
Place: Naples and Nisida

Leone de Casaldi is an exiled soldier who makes a forbidden journey to the island of Nisida, outside Naples, Italy, to see Sylvia, with whom he is infatuated. Leone knows she is a noble but little else. While on Nisida, Leone encounters Don Gaspar, Chamberlain to King Fernand of Naples. After hearing Leone's plight, Don Gaspar convinces him to travel to Naples to have his exile lifted. Leone and Sylvia meet in Naples, at which time Leone discovers that she is actually Sylvia de Linares, the King's mistress. She declares her love for Leone but implores him to abandon her and his plans in Naples. When he refuses, the King discovers him and orders Don Gaspar to arrest and imprison him.

The King expresses to Sylvia his desire that she wed him. However, agents of Rome have been plotting to banish the mistress from Naples. When the King, dismayed, offers to grant her any request, she asks that Leone be set free. A monk appears, brandishing the Papal bull and threatening to banish Sylvia if she remains a mistress to the King. The King plots with Don Gaspar to free Leone and wed him to Sylvia, although Leone would be sent away and Sylvia would remain the King's mistress. Leone and Sylvia marry, but when Leone discovers the plot, he breaks his sword in front of the King and leaves under the monk's escort.

Leone is preparing to take his vows as a monk when Sylvia appears, having followed him disguised as a novice. When she confronts Leone and asks for forgiveness, he realizes his feelings and attempts to flee with her. Sylvia, who has been near death, dies at Leone's feet despite his calls for help.

== Recordings ==
- World premiere recording, Opera Rara ORC58, 2019, Recorded live at Royal Opera House, London, on 18 and 21 July 2018
- Joyce El-Khoury (Countess Sylvia de Linarès), David Junghoon Kim (Leone de Casaldi), Laurent Naouri (Don Gaspar), Vito Priante (Don Fernand d'Aragon), Evgeny Stavinsky (The Monk / Father Superior), Royal Opera Chorus & Orchestra of the Royal Opera House, Sir Mark Elder
