= Michael Spyres =

American operatic tenor (born 1979)

- Born: 1979 (age 46–47); Mansfield, Missouri, U.S.
- Education: University of Music and Performing Arts Vienna
- Occupations: Operatic tenor; Artistic director
- Organizations: Metropolitan Opera; Ozarks Lyric Opera

Michael Spyres (born 1979) is an American operatic tenor. He has a wide vocal range and can also sing baritone roles; he calls himself a "baritenor". He has sung at major international opera houses, including Milan's La Scala, London's Royal Opera, and New York's Metropolitan Opera, and his repertoire includes Handel, Mozart, bel canto, grand opera, and Wagner.

== Life and career ==
Michael Spyres was born in Mansfield, Missouri, and studied singing at the Music and Arts University of the City of Vienna, Austria. He won acclaim and international recognition for his performance in the title role of Rossini's Otello at the Rossini in Wildbad festival in Germany in 2008. He made his debut at La Scala in Milan, in Rossini's Il viaggio a Reims in 2009 and appeared the same year in the demanding leading role of Raoul in Meyerbeer's Les Huguenots at Bard SummerScape in New York. Since then, his career has taken him to the Royal Opera House in London, in the title role of Mozart's Mitridate, re di Ponto under Christophe Rousset, to the Teatro Comunale di Bologna and La Monnaie in Brussels, as Arnold in Rossini's Guillaume Tell, a role he also sang at the Century II Performing Arts & Convention Center in 2014, in a production conducted by Nayden Todorov, to Opéra National de Bordeaux for the title role in Berlioz's La damnation de Faust under Paul Daniel, and to the Liceu in Barcelona, in the title role of Offenbach's Les contes d'Hoffmann under Stéphane Denève. He also performed the title role in a new production of Adam's Le postillon de Lonjumeau at the Opéra-Comique in Paris in 2019, conducted by Sébastien Rouland.

In 2020 Spyres made his debut at the Metropolitan Opera in New York City, as Faust in a concert performance of La Damnation de Faust. Subsequently he sang there the title role in Mozart's Idomeneo in 2022 and Pollione in Bellini's Norma in 2023 with Sonya Yoncheva as Norma. He made his role debut as Tristan in Wagner's Tristan und Isolde at the Metropolitan on March 9, 2026. The cast included Lise Davidsen as Isolde, Ekaterina Gubanova as Brangäne, Tomasz Konieczny as Kurwenal with the Met's music director Yannick Nézet-Séguin conducting. The performance of March 21, 2026, was telecast to theatres as part of the Metropolitan Opera Live in HD series.

His many recordings include Berlioz's Les Troyens (as Énée) and his Requiem, the song cycle Les nuits d'été, La damnation de Faust, Rossini's Otello, Guillaume Tell and Le siège de Corinthe for Naxos Records, Les Huguenots for American Symphony Orchestra and the solo albums Espoir (2017) for Opera Rara, Baritenor (2021) for Erato, In the Shadows (2024) with Les Talens Lyriques conducted by Christophe Rousset.

Spyres is the artistic director of Ozarks Lyric Opera (formerly Springfield Regional Opera) in Springfield, Missouri.

== Recordings ==
=== Audio recordings of complete operas ===
- 2007: Rossini, La gazzetta, Marco Cristarella Orestano (Don Pomponio Storion), Judith Gauthier (Lisetta), Giulio Mastrototaro (Filippo), Vincenzo Bruzzaniti (Don Anselmo), Rossella Bevacqua (Doralice), Michael Spyres (Alberto), Maria Soulis (Madama La Rose), Filippo Polinelli (Monsù Traversen) & Ugo Mahieux (harpsichord). San Pietro a Majella Chorus, Naples; Czech Chamber Soloists, Brno; Christopher Franklin, conductor. Recorded live, July 14, 19 and 22, 2007, Kurhaus, Bad Wildbad, Germany; 19th Rossini in Wildbad Festival. CD: Naxos.
- 2008: Rossini, Otello, Michael Spyres (Otello), Jessica Pratt (Desdemona), Ugo Guagliardo (Elmiro Balberigo), Giorgio Trucco (Iago), Géraldine Chauvet (Emilia), Filippo Adami (Rodrigo), Sean Spyres (Doge), Hugo Colin (Lucio), Leonardo Cortellazzi (Gondoliere). Virtuosi Brunensis & Transylvania State Philharmonic Choir, Cluj, Antonino Fogliani, conductor. Recorded live, Kursaal, Bad Wildbad, Germany, July 12, 17 and 19, 2008, 20th Rossini in Wildbad Festival. CD: Naxos.
- 2009: Meyerbeer, Les Huguenots, Michael Spyres (Raoul de Nagis), Andrew Schroeder (Count de Nevers), Peter Volpe (Marcel), Erin Morley (Marguerite de Valois), Alexandra Deshorties (Valentine), Marie Lenormand (Urbain), John Marcus Bindel (Count de Saint-Bris). American Symphony Orchestra, Leon Botstein, conductor. Recorded live, July 2009, Bard SummerScape. Digital audio: American Symphony Orchestra.
- 2010: Rossini, Le siège de Corinthe, Lorenzo Regazzo (Mahomet II), Majella Cullagh (Pamyra), Marc Sala (Cléomène), Michael Spyres (Néoclès), Matthieu Lécroart (Hiéros), Gustavo Quaresma Ramos (Adraste), Marco Filippo Romano (Omar) & Silvia Beltrami (Ismène). Camerata Bach Choir, Poznań; Virtuosi Brunensis; Jean-Luc Tingaud (conductor). Recorded live, July 18, 20, 23, 2010, 22nd Rossini in Wildbad Festival, Trinkhalle, Bad Wildbad, Germany. CD: Naxos.
- 2011: Mazzoni, Antigono, Michael Spyres (Antigono), Geraldine McGreevy (Berenice), Pamela Lucciarini (Demetrio), Ana Quintans (Ismene), Maria Hinojosa Montenegro (Clearco), Martin Oro (Alessandro). Divino Sospiro (instrumental ensemble), Enrico Onofri, conductor. Recorded live, June 21 and 22, 2011, Grande Auditorium, Centro Cultural de Belem, Lisbon, Portugal. CD: Dynamic.
- 2013: Rossini, Guillaume Tell, Andrew Foster-Williams (Tell), Alessandra Volpe (Hedwige), Judith Howarth (Mathilde), Michael Spyres (Arnold), Tara Stafford (Jemmy), Giulio Pelligra (Rodolphe), Artavazd Sargsyan (Ruodi), Nahuel Di Pierro (Walther Fürst/Melchthal), Raffaele Facciolà (Gesler), Marco Filippo Romano (Leuthold). Camerata Bach Choir, Poznań; Virtuosi Brunensis; Antonino Fogliani, conductor. Recorded live, July 13, 16, 18, 21, 2013, Trinkhalle, Bad Wildbad, Germany, 25th Rossini in Wildbad Festival. CD: Naxos. (See related video below.)
- 2014: Donizetti, Les Martyrs, Michael Spyres (Polyeucte), Joyce El-Khoury (Pauline), David Kempster (Sévère), Brindley Sherratt (Félix), Clive Bayley (Callisthènes), Wynne Evans (Néarque). Orchestra of the Age of Enlightenment, Mark Elder, conductor. Recorded October/November 2014, St. Clement's Church, London. CD: Opera Rara.
- 2015: Hérold, Le pré aux clercs, Marie-Ève Munger (Isabelle de Montal), Marie Lenormand (Marguerite de Navarre), Jeanne Crousaud (Nicette), Michael Spyres (Mergy), Éric Huchet (Cantarelli), Christian Helmer (Girot). Coro e Orquestra Gulbenkian, Paul McCreesh, conductor. Studio recording (based on a stage production at the Opéra-Comique): April 7 and 8, 2015, Grande Auditorio of the Calouste Gulbenkian Foundation. CD: Palazetto Bru Zane/Ediciones Singulares.
- 2015: Donizetti, Le duc d'Albe, Michael Spyres (Henri de Bruges), Angela Meade (Hélène d'Egmont), Laurent Naouri (Le Duc d'Albe), David Stout (Sandoval). Opera Rara Chorus, Hallé Orchestra, Mark Elder, conductor. Studio recording: June 2015, Hallé St. Peter's, Ancoats, Manchester. CD: Opera Rara.
- 2017: Berlioz, Les Troyens, Joyce DiDonato (Didon), Michael Spyres (Énée), Marie-Nicole Lemieux (Cassandre), Stéphane Degout (Chorèbe), Hanna Hipp (Anna), Nicolas Courjal (Narbal), Philippe Sly (Panthée), Marianne Crebassa (Ascagne), Cyrille Dubois (Iopas), Stanislas de Barbeyrac (Hylas/Hélénus). Opéra National du Rhin Chorus; Baden State Opera Chorus; Strasbourg Philharmonic Orchestra and Chorus, John Nelson, conductor. Recorded live, April 15, 17, and 18, 2017, Salle Érasme, Strasbourg. CD: Erato. Includes bonus DVD with highlights from the concert on April 15. Awarded Gramophone's 2018 Recording of the Year.
- 2019: Berlioz, La Damnation de Faust, Michael Spyres- Faust, Joyce DiDonato- Marguerite, Nicolas Courjal- Méphistophélès, Alexandre Duhamel- Brander, Les Petits Chanteurs de Strasbourg, Maîtrise de l'Opéra National du Rhin, Orchestre Philharmonique de Strasbourg, conducted by John Nelson. Recorded live, April 25 and 26, Salle Érasme, Strasbourg. CD: Erato. Includes DVD with highlights of the April 25 concert.
- 2020: Mozart, Mitridate, re di Ponto, Michael Spyres (Mitridate), Julie Fuchs (Aspasia), Sabine Devieilhe (Ismène), Elsa Dreisig (Sifare), Paul-Antoine Bénos-Djian (Farnace), Adriana Bignagni Lesca (Arbate), Cyrille Dubois (Marzio). Les Musiciens du Louvre, Marc Minkowski, conductor. Studio recording: 19–23 November, 2020, SR1, Philharmonie de Paris. CD: Erato.
- 2021: Handel, Theodora, Lisette Oropesa (Theodora), Joyce DiDonato (Irene), Paul-Antoine Bénos-Djian (Didymus), Michael Spyres (Septimius), John Chest (Valens). Il Pomo d'Oro, Maxim Emelyanychev, conductor. Recorded, November 26-29, 2021, Alfried Krupp Saal, Philharmonie Essen. CD: Erato.

=== Video recordings of complete operas ===
- 2013: Rossini, Guillaume Tell, Andrew Foster-Williams (Tell), Alessandra Volpe (Hedwige), Judith Howarth (Mathilde), Michael Spyres (Arnold), Tara Stafford (Jemmy), Giulio Pelligra (Rodolphe), Artavazd Sargsyan (Ruodi), Nahuel Di Pierro (Walther Fürst/Melchthal), Raffaele Facciolà (Gesler), Marco Filippo Romano (Leuthold). Camerata Bach Choir, Poznań; Virtuosi Brunensis; Antonino Fogliani, conductor. DVD: Bongiovanni. (See related audio above.)
- 2015: Mayr, Medea in Corinto, Michael Spyres (Giasone), Davinia Rodriguez (Medea), Roberto Lorenzi (Creonte), Mihaela Marcu (Creusa), Paolo Cauteruccio (Evandro), Marco Stefani (Tideo), Nozomi Kato (Ismene), Enea Scala (Egeo). Orchestra Internazionale d'Italia; Corul Filarmonicii de Stat Transilvania; Fabio Luisi, conductor; Benedetto Sicca, stage director. Recorded live, July-August, 2015, Festival della Valle d'Itria, Palazzo Ducale, Martina Franca, Italy. DVD: Dynamic
- 2016: Mozart, Mitridate, re di Ponto, Michael Spyres (Mitridate), Patricia Petibon (Aspasia), Myrtò Papatanasiu (Sifare), Christophe Dumaux (Farnace), Sabine Devieilhe (Ismene), Cyrille Dubois (Marzio), Jaël Azzaretti (Arbate). Le Concert d’Astrée, Emmanuelle Haïm, conductor; Clément Hervieu-Léger, stage director. Recorded live, February 20, 2016, Théâtre des Champs-Élysées, Paris. Blu-ray/DVD: Erato.
- 2016: Handel, Il trionfo del tempo e del disinganno, HWV46a, Sabine Devieilhe (Bellezza), Franco Fagioli (Piacere), Sara Mingardo (Disinganno), Michael Spyres (Tempo). Le Concert d'Astrée, Emmanuelle Haïm (conductor) & Krzysztof Warlikowski (stage director). Recorded live, July 2016, Théâtre de l'Archevêché, Aix-en-Provence Festival. Blu-ray/DVD: Erato.
- 2018: Gounod, La Nonne sanglante, Michael Spyres (Rodolphe), Marion Lebeque (La nonne sanglante), Vannina Santoni, (Agnès), Jérôme Boutillier (Le Comte), Jodi Devos (Arthur), Jean Teitgen (Pierre L'Ermite), Luc Bertin-Hugault (Le baron), Enquerrand De Hys (Fritz). Accentus (choir); Insula Orchestra; Laurence Equilbey, conductor; David Bobée, stage director. Recorded June 10 and 12, 2018, Opéra-Comique, Paris. Blu-ray/DVD: Naxos 2019.
- 2019: Adam, Le postillon de Lonjumeau, Michael Spyres (Chapelou/Saint-Phar), Florie Valiquette (Madeleine/Madame de Latour), Franck Leguérinel (Le Marquis de Corcy), Laurent Kubla (Biju/Alcindor), Michel Fau (Rose), Yannis Ezziadi (Louis XV), Julien Clément (Bourdon), Accentus (choir), Orchestre de l'Opera de Rouen Normandie, Sébastien Rouland, conductor; Michel Fau, stage director. A co-production by the Opéra-Comique and François Roussillon et Associés. Recorded live, April 5 & 7, 2019, Opéra Comique, Paris. Blu-ray/DVD: Naxos/fRA Prod Cinema.
- 2019: Berlioz, Benvenuto Cellini, Michael Spyres (Benvenuto Cellini), Sophia Burgos (Teresa), Maurizio Muraro (Balducci), Adèle Charvet (Ascanio), Lionel Lhote (Fieramosca), Tareq Nazmi (le Pape Clément). Monteverdi Choir; Orchestre Révolutionnaire et Romantique; John Eliot Gardiner conductor; Sébastien Glas, production director; Noa Naamat, stage director. Recorded, September 8, 2019, Opéra Royal de Versailles. DVD: Château de Versailles spectacles.
- 2026: Wagner, Tristan und Isolde, Michael Spyres (Tristan), Lise Davidsen (Isolde), Ekaterina Gubanova (Brangäne), Ryan Speedo Green (King Marke), Tomasz Konieczny (Kurwenal). Metropolitan Opera Orchestra & Chorus; Yannick Nézet-Séguin, conductor; Yuval Sharon, stage director. Recorded live, March 21, 2026, Metropolitan Opera House (Lincoln Center). Met Opera on Demand.

=== Orchestral works ===
- Robert Schumann: Scenes from Goethe's 'Faust', American Symphony Orchestra, Twyla Robinson, Andrew Schroeder, Kyle Ketelsen, Concert Chorale of New York, Michael Spyres, Matt Boehler, Leon Botstein
- Hector Berlioz, Les Nuits d'été, Michael Spyres (baritenor), Timothy Ridout (viola), Orchestre philharmonique de Strasbourg, John Nelson
- Berlioz, Requiem, Michael Spyres, tenor, London Philharmonic Choir, Philharmonia Chorus, Philharmonia Orchestra, conducted by John Nelson. 2 CD + 1 DVD Erato 2019. Choc de Classica.
- Gioachino Rossini Messa di Gloria, Eleonora Buratto (soprano), Teresa Iervolino (contralto), Lawrence Brownlee (tenor), Michael Spyres (tenor), Carlo Lepore (bass), Orchestra dell'Accademia Nazionale di Santa Cecilia, Coro dell'Accademia Nazionale di Santa Cecilia, Antonio Pappano
- Maurice Ravel, Cantates Pour Le Prix de Rome, Véronique Gens, Vannina Santoni (sopranos), Sophie Koch, Janina Baechle (mezzos), Julien Behr, Michael Spyres (tenors), Jacques Imbrailo (baritone), Choeur et Orchestre National des Pays de La Loire, Pascal Rophé
- Felix Mendelssohn, Symphonies & Overtures, Lucy Crowe (soprano), Jurgita Adamonytė (mezzo), Michael Spyres (tenor), Alexander Knox (Puck), Ceri-lyn Cissone (Titania), Frankie Wakefield (Oberon), Maria Joao Pires (piano), London Symphony Orchestra, The Monteverdi Choir, Sir John Eliot Gardiner
- Antonín Dvořák, Stabat Mater, Op. 58, Eri Nakamura (soprano), Elisabeth Kulman (contralto), Michael Spyres (tenor), Jongmin Park (bass), Czech Philharmonic Orchestra, Prague Philharmonic Choir, Jiří Bělohlávek

=== Recitals ===
- A Fool For Love (2011), Michael Spyres (tenor), Moscow Chamber Orchestra, Constantine Orbelian
- Espoir (2017), Michael Spyres (tenor), Joyce El-Khoury (soprano), The Hallé, Carlo Rizzi
- Gioachino Rossini: Amici e Rivali (2020), Michael Spyres (tenor), Lawrence Brownlee (tenor), I Virtuosi Italiani, Corrado Rovaris. CD: Erato.
- Baritenor (2021), Michael Spyres (baritenor), Orchestre Philharmonique de Strasbourg, Marko Letonja
- In the Shadows (2024) with Les Talens Lyriques conducted by Christophe Rousset; works by Méhul, Beethoven, Rossini, Meyerbeer, von Weber, Auber, Spontini, Bellini, Marschner, Wagner; Erato Records 5419 78798-2

== Awards and titles ==
- 2021: Ordre des Arts et des Lettres (France)
- 2025/2026: 'Singer of the year' by the opera magazine Opernwelt.
