= Les martyrs =

1840 opera by Gaetano Donizetti

- Grand opera by Gaetano Donizetti
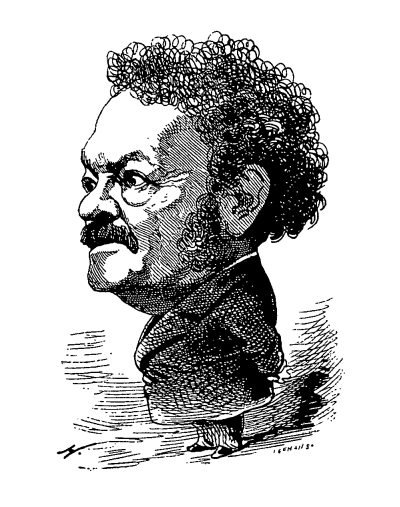
- Gilbert Duprez, who sang the title role in the premiere
- Librettist: Eugène Scribe
- Language: French
- Based on: Corneille's Polyeucte
- Premiere: 10 April 1840; Paris Opéra

Les martyrs (French pronunciation: [le maʁtiʁ], The Martyrs) is a four-act grand opera by Gaetano Donizetti set to a French libretto by Eugène Scribe. The libretto was based on one written by Salvadore Cammarano for an original Italian version known as Poliuto, which was not performed until after the composer's death. Pierre Corneille's play Polyeucte written in 1641–42, the story of which reflected the life of the early Christian martyr Saint Polyeuctus, is the original source for both versions.

When Poliuto was banned by the King of Naples just before it was due to be performed in 1838, Donizetti became angry at this decision and, with a commission from the Paris Opéra due, he paid the penalty to the San Carlo for not producing an original work as a substitute, and left Naples for Paris arriving on 21 October.

As his first of two commissions for the Opéra, he proposed to revise Poliuto and, between 1839 and 1840, a French text was prepared by the noted French librettist and dramatist, Eugène Scribe, which conformed to the conventions of French grand opera but which incorporated 80% of the music from Poliuto. Revised to suit the taste of the Paris opera-going public and with the title changed to Les martyrs, the opera was presented on 10 April 1840.

When eventually given in Italy, Les martyrs was initially presented in a translation from the French version under several titles including I martiri. It took until 30 November 1848, months after the composer's death, in order for Poliuto to finally appear at the San Carlo in its original Italian three-act version, the one which is most frequently performed today.

It is regarded by one writer as Donizetti's "most personal opera" with the music being "some of the finest Donizetti was to compose".

== Composition history ==
=== Composed for Naples as Poliuto ===
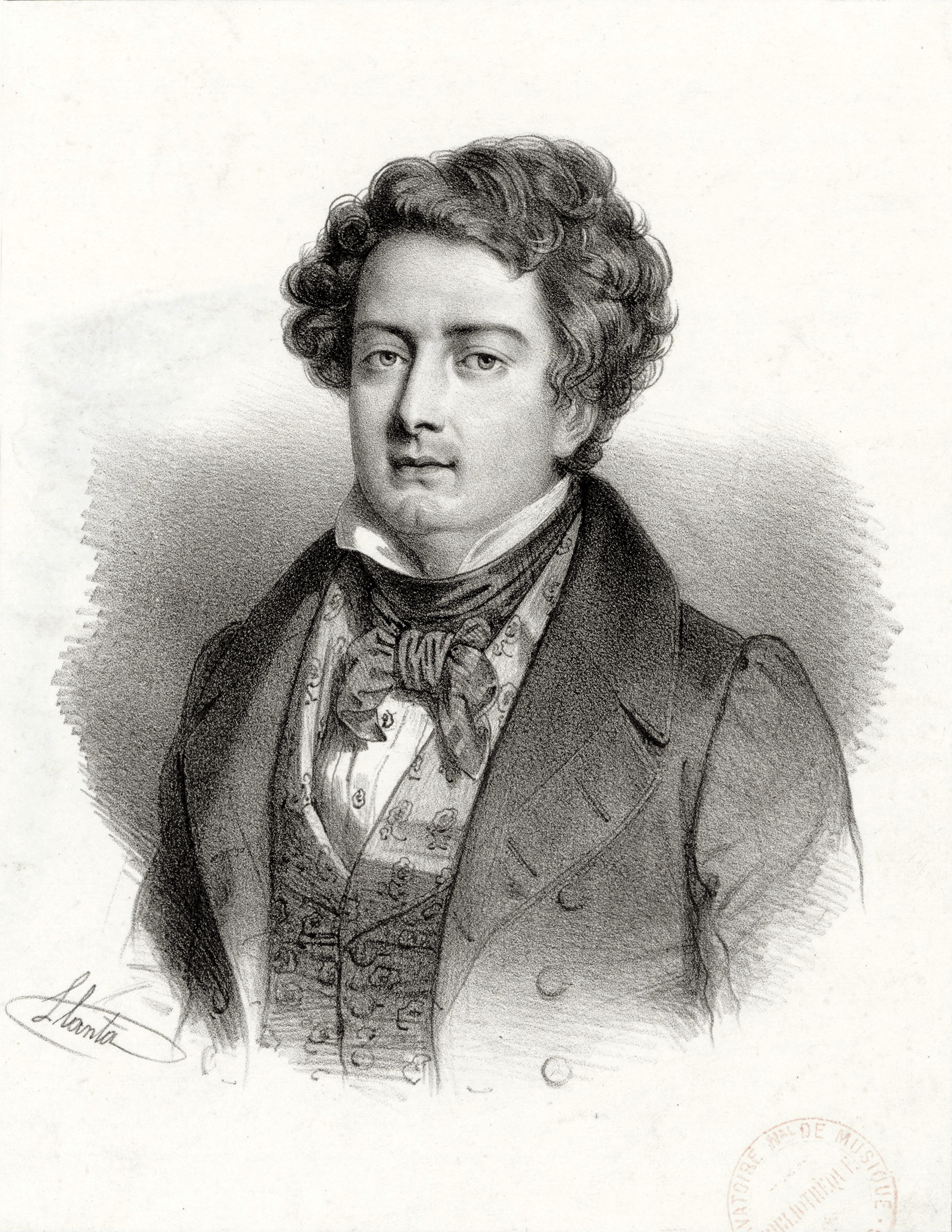
Adolphe Nourrit

Donizetti had been gradually considering further involvement with the Parisian stage after the tremendous success of his Lucia di Lammermoor at the Théâtre-Italien in December 1837. As Roger Parker and William Ashbrook note, "negotiations with Henri Duponchel, the director of the Opéra, took on a positive note for the first time" and "the road to Paris lay open for him", the first Italian to obtain a commission to write a real grand opera.

In addition, while Donizetti was in Venice for the premiere of Maria de Rudenz the following January, he had met and had been impressed with Adolphe Nourrit, who had been the principal tenor in Paris, having sung roles written for him by the major French composers such as Meyerbeer, Auber, Halévy, as well as Rossini (in William Tell) after that composer had moved to Paris in 1829. However, by the late 1830s, Nourrit's popularity in Paris was in decline, and he was in danger of being supplanted in the public's affections by rising star Gilbert Duprez who the composer had tried to interest in a Paris production of L'assedio di Calais (The Siege of Calais) in 1836, but which failed to gain attention outside Italy.

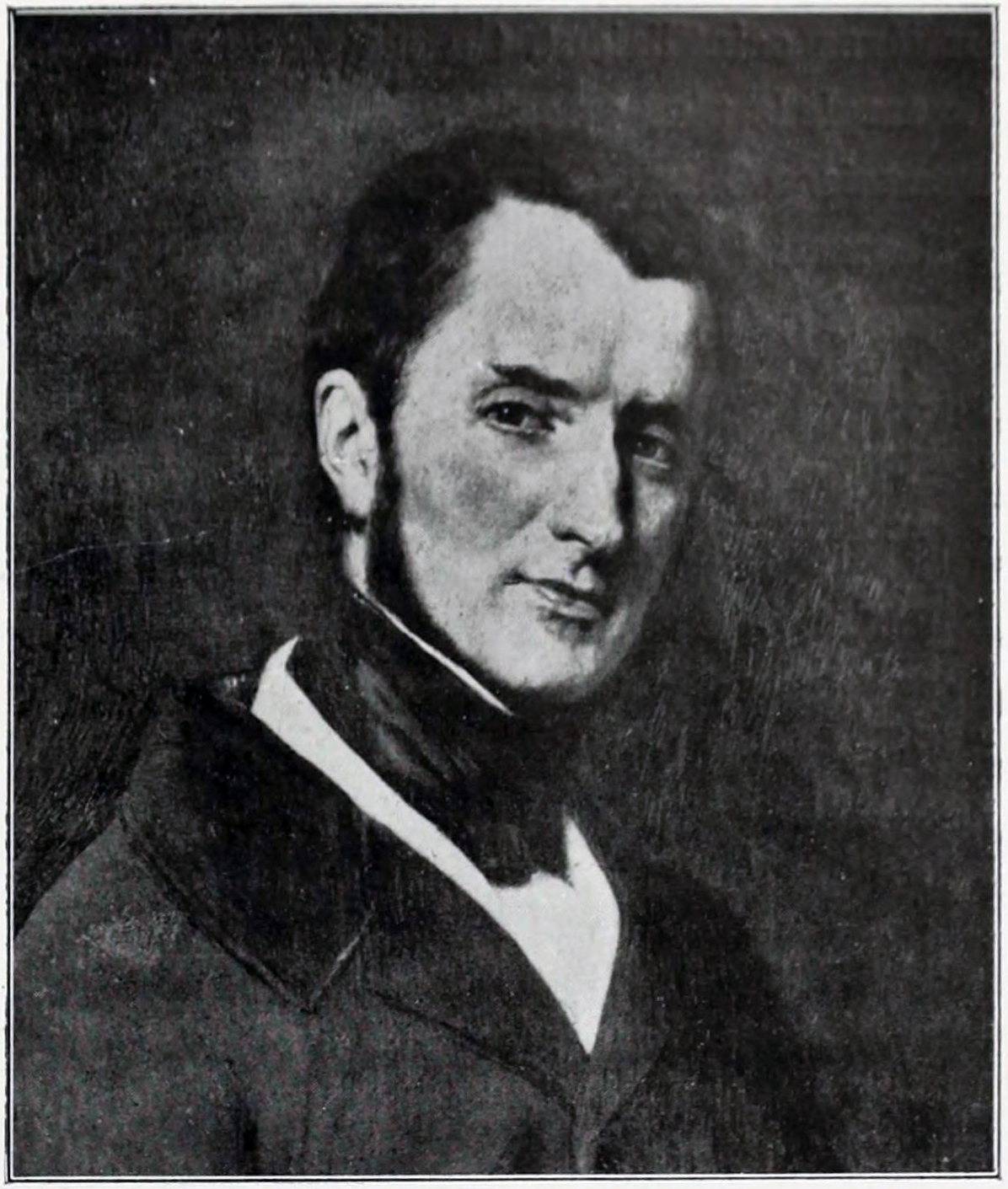
Henri Duponchel, director of the Paris Opéra

Donizetti returned to Naples on 24 February, where he began planning for the production of Poliuto but, at the same time, he had also hoped for a permanent supervisory appointment at the Collegio di San Pietro a Maiella there. However, the post went the composer, Saverio Mercadante. Therefore, on 25 May 1838, Donizetti responded to an invitation from the Paris Opéra to compose two new works, specifying that the contract would require a libretto from Scribe with specific performance dates and a rehearsal periods included. Now committed to produce his next opera for Naples, the composer wrote Poliuto "with more than half an eye to its potential for it being recast as a French grand opera".

Upon arriving in Naples, Donizetti found that Nourrit was also staying there. The tenor was determined to "take on a [singing] technique which was so different from that which he had been taught" and he was grateful to the composer for lessons in that technique. Writing to his wife, he expressed his joy "at being born to a new artistic life" in singing Italian opera under the composer's direction. He added: [Donizetti is] "pulling strings to get me engaged here".

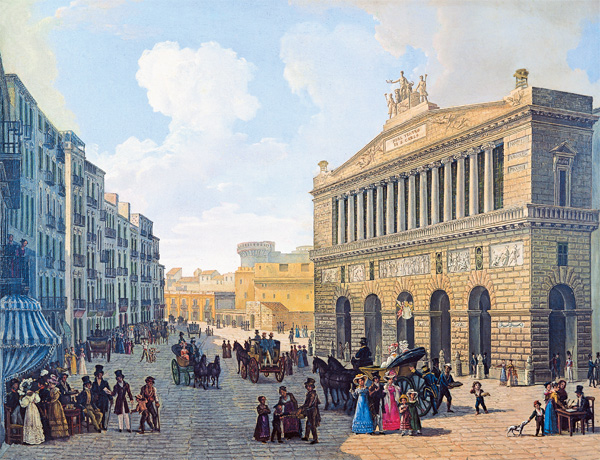
Teatro San Carlo, Naples c. 1830

Nourrit greatly influenced the composer in his choice of subject and in the progress of the new opera, such that Donizetti tailored the title role for the tenor who had, by then, been engaged for the autumn season in Naples. Moreover, Nourrit is also regarded as important in influencing the preparation of Cammarano's libretto as he adapted Corneille's play from what William Ashbrook describes as "a spiritual drama, with its carefully observed unities" into a Romantic melodrama, achieved by adding plot features such as Poliuto's jealousy of his wife's previous relationship with the Roman pro-consul, Severus (Sévère in this opera), which did not exist in the original play. In doing so, the play's narrative perspective of the action (which was originally seen through the eyes of Pauline's confidante, Stratonice) was significantly altered by the use of directly shown dramatic action. This is especially evidenced at the end of act 2 of Poliuto (which became act 3 in Les martyrs) when Polyeucte overthrows the altar.

Work began by 10 May on the music for Poliuto, performances of which appear to have been planned for the autumn season. However, by the middle of June, the first of several difficulties emerged. The San Carlo intendant, Domenico Barbaja, needed the libretto to be first approved by the court censor, Royer, who gave his support. But when the completed libretto finally moved up the chain of command to the king, a response was forthcoming on 11 August to the effect that "His majesty deigned with his own sacred hand to declare that the histories of the martyrs are venerated in the Church and are not presented on the stage".

The opera's last-minute cancellation angered Donizetti so much that he resolved to move to Paris to further his career there. He left Naples in October 1838, vowing never to have any further dealings with the San Carlo administration. But the cancellation dealt a crushing blow to Nourrit's hopes of reviving his flagging career, and even though he appeared in the opera which was substituted, Saverio Mercadante's Il giuramento, as well as productions of Elena da Feltre and Norma which followed, depression overtook him. On 8 March 1839 he jumped to his death from a window of his apartment in Naples.

== Donizetti moves to Paris ==
=== Poliuto adapted to become Les martyrs ===
Prior to Donizetti's letter written from Naples to the Paris Opéra on 25 May 1838, it appears that he had already been told that a libretto written by Scribe, Le Comte Julien, was on its way to him. But on 12 May he had written to the tenor Gilbert Duprez (in which he asks that it not be shown to anyone else) where he laid out some of his objections to Scribe's libretto, mentioning potential issues such as the basic storyline and his concern over the vocal capabilities of the proposed dramatic soprano Cornélie Falcon who would have been available to sing the principal soprano role."A traitor to his country and love also as an episode do not please me". The following month, Donizetti wrote to Count Gaetano Melzi exclaiming that he did not want "warlike things [...] I want emotions on the stage and not battles".

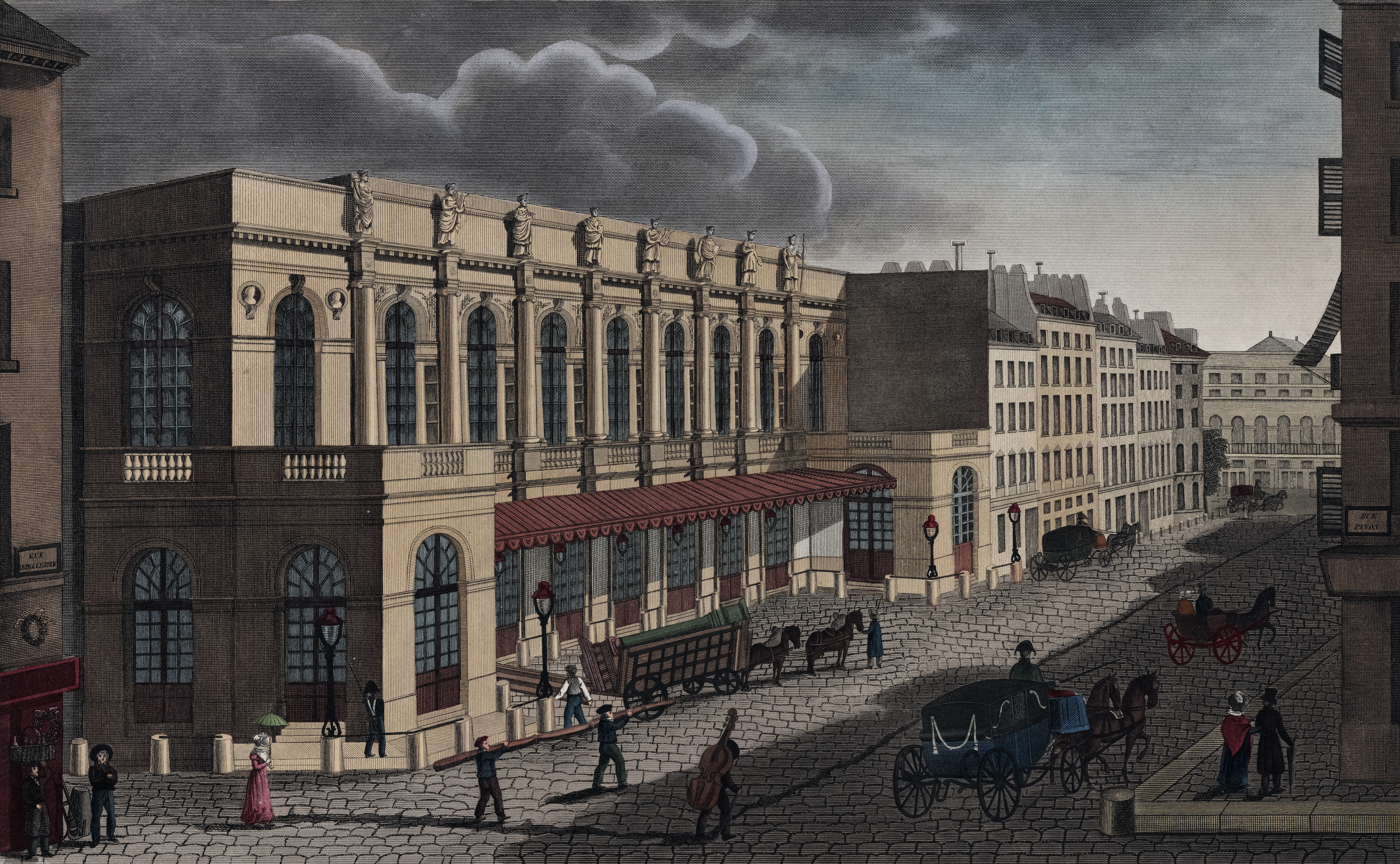
Salle le Peletier, the Théâtre de l'Académie royale de Musique (Paris Opéra) c. 1821)

With the Poliuto disaster behind him, Donizetti arrived in Paris in late October 1838 and quickly met and became friendly with the composer Adolphe Adam, who was living in the same apartment building where he was staying. Donizetti offered his Poliuto to the Académie Royale de Musique and it was accepted for performances to begin in April 1840.

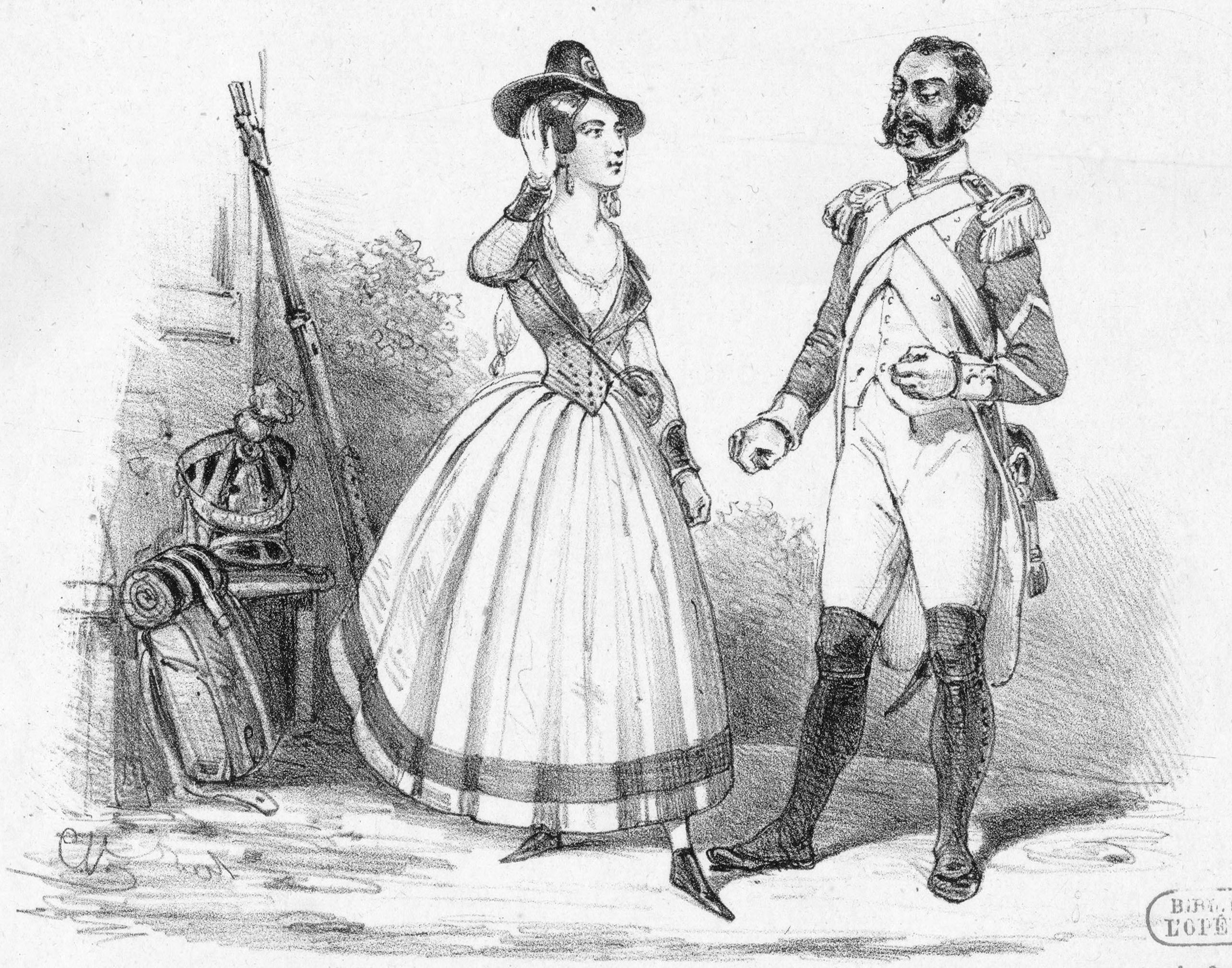
Juliette Borghèse and François-Louis Henry in the premiere of La fille du régiment, 11 February 1840

While in Paris, a city which increasingly he came to dislike, Donizetti oversaw stagings of Roberto Devereux and L'elisir d'amore during the following December and January, and he also negotiated a longer time-frame for the delivery of the completed libretto of Les martyrs from Scribe as well as that for having the completed score of the second commission ready. This commission, which became known as Le duc d'Albe, was never completed.

During 1839, Lucia di Lammermoor, after being somewhat revised and translated into French, became Lucie de Lammermoor, and this version was presented in August. With rehearsals for Les martyrs not planned until early 1840, the composer had time to write yet another opera, La fille du régiment, his first written directly to a French text. It received its premiere on 11 February 1840, by which time Martyrs was in rehearsal for performances in April.

=== The adaptation ===
In re-designing Poliuto as an expanded, four-act French grand opera set to Scribe's French text, Donizetti had to make many changes. In addition to re-writing and expanding the overture, a ballet was needed. Other changes had to accommodate the expanded roles of both the Roman Proconsul Severus (now Sévère) and that of the governor, Felice (now Félix). This latter role was changed from the original tenor to become a deep bass. An additional element was that the tenor arias needed to be rewritten in order to suit the voice of Duprez (as Polyeucte) rather than that of Nourrit, due to the former's capability for reaching high C sharp from the chest, thus far surpassing the vocally declining Nourrit.

Although Donizetti was obliged to shift the placement of arias to other locations within the text, Scribe had to accept the modification of some of his text to fit the existing music. But given the overall expansion of the opera into four acts, new material needed to be created by both the librettist and the composer, most especially for the end of the expanded act 1 and the beginning of new act 2.

But also of significance, according to British conductor Mark Elder, was:

Donizetti's mastery of the preferences of his Parisian audience. The whole sound world is markedly different from the familiar Donizetti of Lucia di Lammermoor or Maria Stuarda ... Gone is the Italian emphasis on display for its own sake. In its place is a more passionate declaration coupled to a richly textured orchestra...

The other principal change was in the plot itself. Although Ashbrook regards it as essentially being the same as "that of Poliuto but without the motivation of the hero's jealousy", he states that Donizetti was in favour of more closely mirroring Corneille's original play for the Paris version, rather than accepting Cammarano's initial attempts to appease the censors in Naples by playing down the religious rivalry, an attempt, which in any case, had been a failure.

Both William Ashbrook and Charles Osborne outline the following major alterations which came about in order to create Les martyrs:

- Overture: a new, longer one was substituted for the original.
- Act 1: Cammarano's first act was divided into two acts and each was expanded with new material. This included new music for what was originally Paolina's Di quai soave lagrime. Pauline is given new motivation for her presence at the catacombs, in that now she does not follow her husband there but comes to pray at her mother's tomb, asking to have her feelings for Sévère removed from her heart: (aria) Qu'ici ta main glacée / "Here may your icy hand bless your child".

Act 1 is extended. It includes Polyeucte's surprised reaction upon finding Pauline near the catacombs immediately after he has been baptised. While he proclaims his new faith, she pleads with him to officially keep silent. The act ends with "a new and beautiful trio, Objet de ma constance / "You are object of your husband's constant love ", which, in addition to the couple, includes Néarque (formerly Nearco) and his chorus of Christians. The trio's music has been described as "exceptionally felicitous".
The original act 1, scene 2, which depicts the arrival of Severus in triumph, is now moved into the second part of act 2, and it now includes the ballet.

- Act 2: In the enlarged first scene, Félix, as principal bass, is given two arias, the first being Dieux des Romains / "Roman gods, I will serve your wrath". When Pauline enters, he makes her read aloud his newly written edict banning Christianity and, although anguished, she disguises her feelings from her father, who then expresses his anti-Christian sentiments in the cabaletta Mort à ces infâmes / "Death to those infamous ones". Up to this point in the opera, Pauline believes that Sévère is dead, but when the High Priest Callisthènes enters to announce the Roman's imminent arrival, her aria Sévère existe! then follows, moved from its original position at the end of the opening scene of the opera.

Act 2, scene 2 begins with Sévère's triumphal arrival, after which the ballet consisting of three numbers is performed. Ashbrook observes that Sévère's second aria—Je te perds que je t'adore / "I lose you, you who I love"—is the only aria in the transfer from one version to another which has been significantly altered from "what in Poliuto had been a simple baritone cabaletta [but], in Les martyrs, [has] become a cross between an aria and a finale".

- Act 3: Both musicologists note that this act is almost identical to the original act 2, with the exception of a few significant alterations, the original aria for Poliuto (Fu macchiato l'onor mio) being one. This is replaced with Polyeucte's cavatina Mon seul trésor / "My only treasure, my supreme goodness" and cabaletta Oui, j'irai dans les temples / "Yes, I shall go into their temples". With jealousy no longer being the motive for some of the character's actions, "the new material has a very different effect" as written for a different tenor voice, Charles Osborne stating that this aria was written to accommodate Duprez's ability to reach "a high C sung in full voice from the chest".
- Act 4: Callisthène's "old fashioned aria con coro" (aria with chorus) at the beginning is replaced with a trio for Félix, Sévère, and Pauline, which made Pauline's role longer and more demanding. In addition, other changes were seen in the final two scenes, one being the expansion of the opening of the choral finale to double its length.

Finally, January 1840 became the time for rehearsals to begin. However, delays due to illness close to the April premiere abounded, much to the composer's frustration and annoyance.

== Performance history ==
19th century

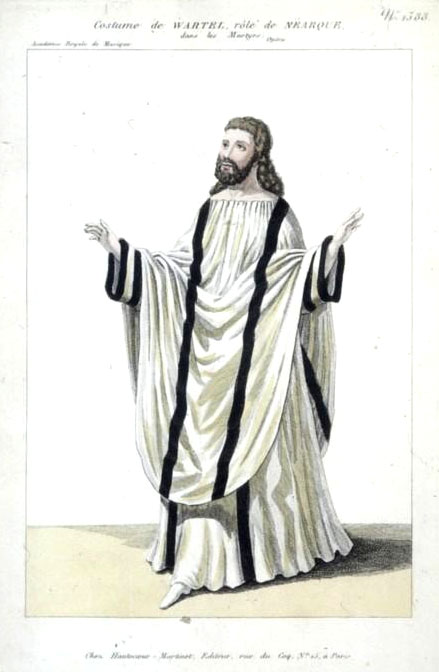
Costume design for Néarque in the 1840 premiere

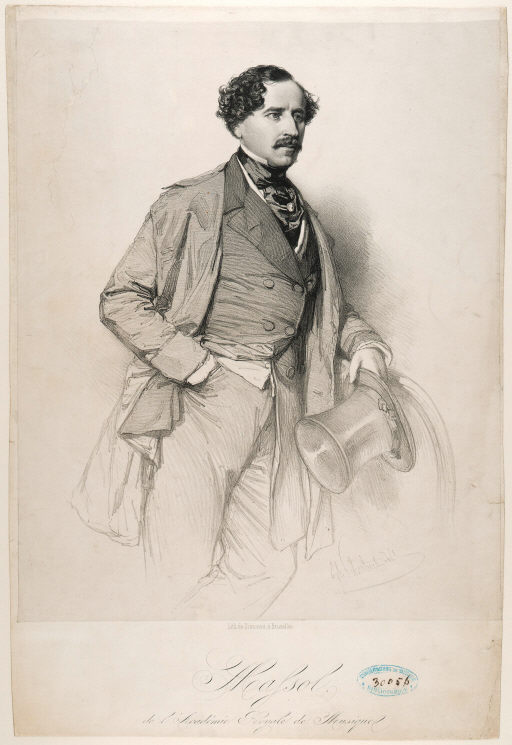
Jean-Étienne-Auguste (aka Eugène) Massol sang Sévėre in the 1840 premiere.

Following the premiere of Les martyrs on 10 April 1840 in Paris, which was popular with audiences, it was presented over twenty times that season in addition to opening the following season.

However, while Ashbrook notes that it was not particularly successful, at the time there was disagreement between those critics who loved and approved of Italian opera, and those who worried that the quality of French opera was being compromised by the introduction of Italian works and features into the French repertoire. For example, Hector Berlioz who disliked Italian operas by Donizetti and Vincenzo Bellini, (a composer who was also popular at the time in Paris), found that for him, Les martyrs was merely a "Credo in four acts," although Théophile Gautier is known to have liked the opera, writing that "M. Donizetti has understood in a superior way all the beauties that this situation could contain." But writer Herbert Weinstock has noted that while twenty performances is no failure, when compared against the popularity of Lucie and L'elisir in France, it did not compare in popularity.

Donizetti himself appears to have been happy with what he saw at the performance on 20 April: "My martiri goes from good to better. Today the fourth performance. From three o'clock on, neither loges nor tickets [were available] ... The performance is of the best." he wrote. The ninth performance was attended by many of the French royal family and, in late May, Donizetti wrote to his friend Tommaso Persico in Italy with the news—quoting the French press as stating—"The success of Les martyrs does not weaken ... One must hurry...to see this work as Duprez begins his leave in June". Donizetti left Paris sometime around 7 June and returned to Rome.

First in translation as Paolina e Poliuto (in 1843) and then as Paolina e Severo (in Rome in December 1849), Les martyrs appeared in Italy, finally becoming I martiri. It was presented in Barcelona in 1850 as Paulina y Poliuto ó Los mártires. However, as written in the original Italian, the "more compact, three-act Poliuto was generally preferred" after it was finally given its Naples premiere on 30 November 1848, a few months after Donizetti's death.

The United States premiere of Les martyrs was presented in New Orleans on 24 March 1848. London also saw the French work in April 1852.

20th century and beyond

Les martyrs received its first performance in modern times in a concert version presented at Imperial College, London on 23 January 1975. The role of Félix was sung by John Tomlinson, that of Pauline by Lois McDonall, Polyeucte by Ian Thompson, Sévère by Terence Sharpe, and Callestènes by Alan Watt. The Pro Opera Orchestra and Chorus were conducted by Leslie Head. The performance was presented on BBC radio and recorded by that organisation.

William Ashbrook mentions a revival of Les martyrs at La Fenice in Venice in 1978, which has been recorded. It was also presented by the Opéra de Nancy in February 1996 as well as at the Teatro Municipale Valli, Reggio Emilia, in March 1997.

A revival of both the French and Italian is in process: Les martyrs was given in a concert performance at the Royal Festival Hall in London on 4 November 2014 sponsored by the specialised recording company, Opera Rara, which recorded the opera using a new critical edition prepared by Dr. Flora Willson of King's College, Cambridge. Presented in partnership with the Orchestra of the Age of Enlightenment under Sir Mark Elder, the performance featured Michael Spyres as Polyeucte, Joyce El-Khoury as Pauline, and David Kempster as Sévère. As part of its 2015 season, the Glyndebourne Festival presented Poliuto with tenor Michael Fabiano in the title role.

== Roles ==
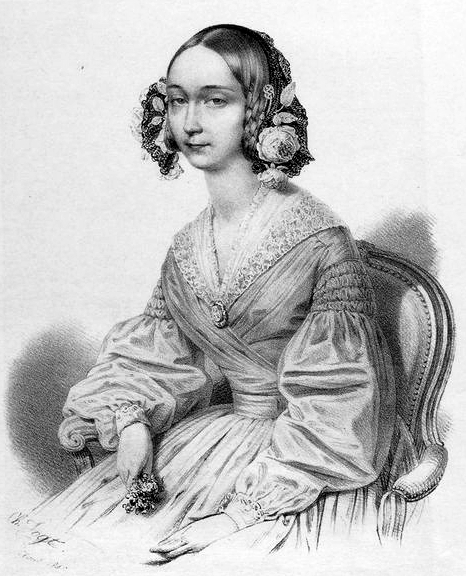
Julie Dorus-Gras sang Pauline in the 1840 premiere.

Role	Voice type	Premiere cast: 10 April 1840
Polyeucte, A magistrate; a convert to Christianity	tenor	Gilbert Duprez
Pauline, Polyeucte's wife	soprano	Julie Dorus-Gras
Sévère, Roman Proconsul	baritone	Jean-Étienne-Auguste Massol
Félix, Pauline's father, Governor of Armenia	bass	Prosper Dérivis
Callisthènes, High Priest of Jupiter	bass	Jacques-Émil Serda
Néarque, A Christian, Polyeucte's friend	tenor	Pierre-François Wartel
A Christian	bass	Molinier
Second Christian	baritone	Wideman

== Synopsis ==
Place: Mytilene
Time: c. 259 A.D.

Armenia has been conquered by the Romans, and they have decreed that Christianity, which has a significant following in the country, must be destroyed and its followers put to death. Pauline had been in love with the Roman general, Sévère, but had married Polyeucte after pressure from her father, Félix, who told her that Sévère had been killed in battle.

=== Act 1 ===
The Catacombs

A secret gathering of Christian worshipers assembles, ready to be baptised into the new faith. Chorus of Christians:
O voûte obscure, ô voûte obscure / "O dark vault, o immense vault, tombs where peace reigns".

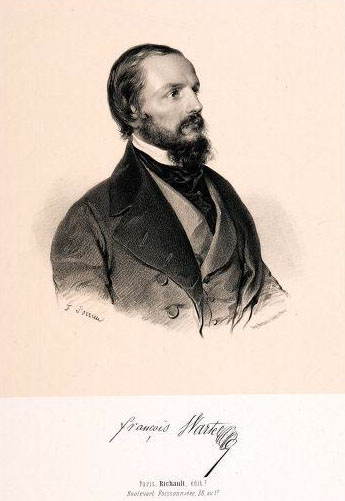
François Wartel sang Néarque at the 1840 premiere.

As they are about to go into the catacombs, Polyeucte, the principal magistrate of Mytilene, is approached by his friend Néarque, the Christian leader, who questions him on his faith: "New Christian, has the God whose law we follow put faith and bravery in your heart?", he asks, continuing to pursue Polyeucte's feelings about how he would reconcile his wife's beliefs with his own. Polyeucte assures him that when his wife was deathly ill, his local gods were deaf to his pleas, but the Christian God provided a signal by means of a clap of thunder and His voice saying "I am waiting for you". Aria: Que l'onde salutaire, s'épanche sur mon front! Et les maux de la terre, pour moi disparaîtront! / "Let the water of salvation / Flow over my brow / And the evils of the earth / For me will disappear!" Néarque pleads for heaven and the angels to receive his friend and the two men enter the catacombs. As they leave, a Christian rushes in to inform them that the governor's soldiers are on their way. Unafraid, Polyeucte declares "Let's go! God expects us!"

Pauline arrives to pray at her mother's tomb. The accompanying soldiers depart, and she offers a sacrifice. Along with the group of young girls who have accompanied her, they sing a hymn to Proserpine, after which she orders all to leave her. Alone, Pauline sings to her dead mother. Aria Toi, qui lis dans mon coeur, ô ma mere! / O toi, qui fus témoin de l'amour de Sévère, de ces nœuds par toi-même approuvés! / "You, who see into my heart, oh mother! Oh you who witnessed the love of Sévère". In her prayer, she tries to balance her feelings for her dead lover with those for her new husband. However, as she prays, she hears the sound of Christian singing coming from the catacombs. Chorus: O toi, notre Père, qui règnes sur terre, comme dans les cieux / "O you, our Father, who reigns on earth as in heaven". She is horrified at hearing the words of "that ungodly sect".

As the Christians leave the catacombs, Polyeucte is surprised to find Pauline there; she is equally shocked and, while he proclaims his faith, she maintains her skepticism. Néarque and the group kneel in prayer for her, while she pleads to Polyeucte to abandon his beliefs. He continues to refuse as the pleading goes on; finally Pauline threatens to reveal the sect's existence to her father, but she is rebuffed. Together the couple plead their cases: his to call upon God's mercy while hers is to beg him to keep silent.

Act finale: Duet and ensemble, first Pauline: Si tu m'aimes, silence! / "Silence, if you love me!"; then Polyeucte: Objet de ma constance, amour de ton époux/ "You are the object of my constant love as your husband"; Néarque and the Christians: "God is our defense; God will watch over us".

=== Act 2 ===
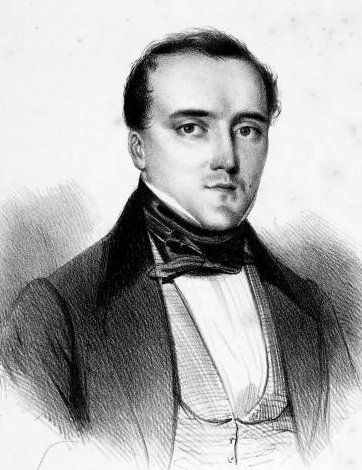
Prosper Dérivis sang the role of Felix in 1840.

Scene 1: The office of Félix, Governor of Armenia

Felix has prepared edicts which condemn the Christians; he proclaims his allegiance to the Roman gods. Aria: Dieux des Romains, dieux [de nos pères] / "Gods of the Romans, [of our fathers], I will serve your wrath". Pauline enters in a rather dream-like state. Her father tells her that he believes that she shares his hatred of the Christians and asks her to read the edict which he has prepared. As she stares at it and, at his insistence hesitatingly reads the edict aloud, she is privately horrified at its strictures. In reinforcing his beliefs, Félix affirms his convictions. (Cabaletta): Mort à ces infâmes, Et livrez aux flammes / "Death to those vile men! And to the flames send, / Their children and their wives,/ Their gold and their goods."

As the edict is proclaimed to the people, Félix is concerned about his daughter's state of mind: "What is the reason for this gloomy sadness, my child?". She appears to be distraught, and he assumes that it may be because of her memories of her unhappy love. As she confesses to some sorrow in losing Sévère, she also insists on her love for her husband: "And whom I love! Yes, my heart belongs to him forever" and she continues (in an aside to herself) "since the dangers he faces have redoubled my love". Then, as martial music is heard from afar, the High Priest Callisthėnes arrives accompanied by other priests and magistrates. He announces the arrival of the Roman proconsul whose standard can be seen in the distance. When asked who it is, Callisthėnes learns that it is the warrior whom all thought to be dead: Sévère. All except Pauline leave to welcome the Roman's arrival.

Alone, she is unable to repress a moment of joy at the news of Sévère's survival. Aria: Sévère existe! Un dieu sauveur / "Sévère is alive! A saviour God [sends him back]". But she quickly represses all emotion: "Be silent!...Be silent my heart!"

Scene 2: The Great Square of Mytilene

A jubilant crowd hails the arrival of Sévère: Gloire à vous, Mars et Bellone! Gloire à toi, jeune héro! / "Glory to you, Mars and Bellona! Glory to you, young hero!". He addresses the people, and without specifying that he is describing the Christians, he tells them that he will sweep away the "this ungodly sect" and then, to himself, expresses his desire to once again see his love. Aria: Amour de mon jeune âge, toi dont la douce image, au sein de l'esclavage, soutint ma vie et mon espoir! / "Love of my youth, You whose sweet image, while in slavery, sustained my life and hope!")

Sévère then sees Félix, greets him while privately wondering where Pauline is. Both men move to a location where they may view the entertainment and dancers appear. A ballet is presented. At its conclusion, Félix assumes that the Emperor will have sent decrees with Sévère, but the pro-consul puts him off, concentrating instead on seeking out Pauline while expressing his continued love for her. Just then, Pauline appears with a group of women – as well as with Polyeucte. Behind them all is Néarque and a group of Christians. The Roman anxiously reaches out to Pauline: "I see Pauline again in this place". "And her husband" Pauline proudly replies, indicating Polyeucte. Sévère expresses his shock and surprise. Cabaletta: Je te perds, toi que j'adore, je te perds et sans retour / "I am losing you, you whom I adore, I am losing you and forever, and still I must conceal My fury and my love!"

During a confrontation between Polyeucte and Sévère in which the former proposes that there may be a higher power than Caesar and the latter expresses surprise and skepticism, Pauline tries to keep the peace. However, the High Priest announces that a new convert has been baptised the previous night, and, in an ensemble finale involving all, Sévère encourages the search for the culprit while at the same time laments the loss of Pauline. Néarque and the Christians express their beliefs and Félix and the High Priest condemn the Christians. The Roman and Armenian officials leave.

=== Act 3 ===
Scene 1: Pauline's bedroom in the women's apartments

Pauline is alone in her room. Aria: Dieux immortels, témoins de mes justes alarmes / Je confie à vous seuls mes tourments et mes larmes / "Immortal gods, witnesses to my just fears / To you alone I entrust my agony and my tears". Suddenly and to her surprise, Sévère enters. He is distraught and expresses his hopes and fears. Aria: En touchant à ce rivage, tout semblait m'offrir l'image, d'un jour pur et sans nuage / "Touching these shores, everything seemed to offer me the picture of a pure and cloudless day". While privately feeling some confusion, she expresses her love for her husband and rebuffs his advances, warning that both will suffer if it continues. Each express his/her feelings. Duet, Pauline and Sévère: Pauline: Ne vois-tu pas qu'hélas! mon cœur / Succombe et cède à sa douleur? / "Do you not see, alas! my heart / Succumbs and yields to its sorrow!"; Sévère: Ne vois-tu pas que ta rigueur / "Do you not see that your severity / Rends and breaks, alas! my heart?". Finally each is able to resolve that they must part, and Sévère leaves.

Polyeucte enters and finds Pauline. He tells her that a sacrifice is being prepared at the temple, and she asks if he will accompany her there. He refuses. "God forbids me to do so!" he declares while she suggests that "if you loved me..."[you would do so]. In response, Polyeucte expresses his supreme love for his wife. Aria: Mon seul trésor, mon bien suprême, tu m'es plus chère que moi-même, et Dieu seul partage avec toi, mon amour et ma foi! / "My only treasure, my supreme happiness, you are dearer to me than myself, and God alone shares with you /My love and my faith!"

Félix then arrives, telling of the capture of Néarque, and announcing that they must all go to the temple. Pauline attempts to dissuade Polyeucte from attending but, as father and daughter leave, he remains steadfast. Aria: Oui, j'irai dans leurs temples! Bientôt tu m'y verras / "Yes, I will go into their temples! Soon you will see me there" and, as they leave, he states: "Yes, the time has come!... God summons me and inspires me! Yes, I must share the martyrdom of a friend!", and he too leaves for the temple.

Scene 2: The Temple of Jupiter

Callisthènes and the Priests have assembled outside the temple. Together with the people who leave the sacred grove, all sing a hymn to Jupiter: Dieu du tonnerre, ton front sévère émeut la terre, et fait aux cieux trembler les dieux! / "God of thunder / Your stern brow / Moves the earth / and makes the gods / temble in heaven!"

Sévère, Félix, and Pauline enter and join the assembled gathering. A chorus of women and then another chorus of priests follows. Death for the godless is proclaimed. Néarque is dragged into the temple in chains, and Callisthènes explains to Sévère that not only is he guilty of worshiping his God but he is seeking new converts. Both officials demand to know the name of the new convert who is thought to have been baptised the previous day. Néarque rebuffs them: "Neither you, nor your torturers, have methods sure enough / Nor your false gods power enough / To force a Christian to betray his oath". As it appears that Néarque is about to be dragged to his death, Polyeucte steps forward and reveals himself to be the man they seek: C'est son complice que vous cherchez?...C'est moi! / "You were looking for his accomplice? It is me!".

All assembled express their reactions. Sévère: Jusqu'au sein du sanctuaire, le parjure qu'il profère, a d'effroi glacé la terre, et le ciel ne tonne pas!/ "The sacrilegious word, still resounds in the temple"; Pauline: L'insensé, le téméraire, se dévoue à leur colère! / "The foolish, reckless one"...; while Polyeucte and Néarque express their joy in their belief: Feu divin, sainte lumière, qui m'embrase et qui m'éclaire / "Divine light, holy light, that embraces me and enlightens me".

Pauline entreats her father to save her husband's life, and then throws herself at Callisthènes' feet, begging him to show mercy. Polyeucte, angry that she has to beg for his life and plead with her gods, breaks free from his captors and climbs to the altar, then smashes the pagan relics: "Your gods are powerless from the force of my blows!".

In a concerted finale, Polyeucte and Néarque proclaim their faith in God as king of heaven and earth; confused, Pauline finds herself praying to the Christian god to intercede, while Sévère, who sees Pauline's anguish, declares that while he wants to intercede for her, "Love wants!...duty forbids!" Félix, Callisthènes, the priests and people all proclaim the Christians as cursed unless they relent, but Polyeucte is steadfast and both he and Néarque are led away.

=== Act 4 ===
Scene 1: Félix's apartment

Pauline continues to plead with her father, but Félix remains firm. Sévère enters and addresses the governor, initially not seeing Pauline. Félix immediately proclaims his allegiance to the emperor and to his gods, and Pauline throws herself at the Proconsul's feet begging him in the name of his love for her to intercede. He is moved and agrees that he will help. In a stirring trio, all three reveal their emotions with Pauline's cries of "O sublime devotion!" in response to Sévère's support, while Félix staunchly maintains his position as the Emperor's representative in opposition to the Roman: "Me! who alone reigns in this province! Me, more than you, am faithful to my honour and to my prince". "Where they will die for their God", he states, "I would die for mine!" But the extended trio continues to close with Félix stating that he will be gracious: "If he repents ... I can save his life!". Pauline immediately runs out of the room.

Scene 2: Inside the prison of the Temple of Jupiter

In his prison cell, Polyeucte is asleep and wakes up, somewhat confused. He has dreamed that Pauline is in truth a loyal and faithful wife and that she has said that "your God will be mine ... and your life is my life". Aria: Réve delicieux dont mon âme est émue, c'était Pauline! / "Delicious dream that moves my soul, it was Pauline. Yes, that is who I saw". Suddenly, Pauline enters and runs to him, saying that she wants to save his life, but he replies that we wishes to save her soul. In her aria Pour toi, ma prière, ardent et sincère / "My ardent and sincere prayer for you has softened the heart of a judge and a father" she explains that her father will not condemn him if he returns to believing in the old gods. He responds: Qu'importe ma vie, sauvée ou ravie / "What good is my life if God doesn't lead you to happiness?".

Suddenly a beam of light enters the prison cell. For Pauline it is the great revelation: "A new ardour inflames my heart", she says as she kneels before Polyeucte who places his hands on her head. She rises, a new Christian, as the sound of celestial harps are heard. Together they express their joy at being united in their faith. Cabaletta: first Pauline, then Polyeucte, then together: O sainte mélodie! Concerts harmonieux / "O holy melody ... It is God who summons us, it is God who waits for us".

Guards enter to take Polyeucte, but embracing each other, the couple leaves together.

Scene 3: At the entrance of the Roman amphitheatre close to the rostrum

In the distance, the people can be seen seated in the amphitheatre; others continue to enter and find seats. The crowd demands that the Christians be delivered to the lions. Sévère and Félix enter, the latter concerned that his daughter has not appeared. From elsewhere, the priests, along with Callisthènes, enter the arena; the High Priest calls upon Félix to pronounce the sentence, which he does from the rostrum.

Polyeucte and Pauline are then led in. The crowd continues to demand action. Seeing his daughter, Félix is horrified and demands to know what she is doing: "My duty!" she declares. "Our God, our faith are the same". Equally horrified, Sévère approaches Pauline pleading with her to consider her father's feelings, but the couple is steadfast; the trumpets sound signalling that the execution is about to begin.

At that moment, singing is heard coming from a group of Christians from outside the arena. Along with Néarque, all are in chains. They are led into the arena and gather around Pauline and Polyeucte as the sound of heavenly harps is heard once again. As the crowd continues to demand that the lions be freed, all the Christians sing in praise of God: "It is God who calls us; it is God who hears us." The signal is given, Sévère pulls out his sword and tries to reach Pauline but is restrained by his men, Félix faints, and the Christians kneel. Pauline rushes into Polyeucte's arms as they stand apart, awaiting death. The roar of the lions is heard.

== Recordings ==
Year	Cast (Polyceute, Pauline, Sévère, Callisthènes, Félix, Néarque)	Conductor, opera house and orchestra	Label
1975	Mario Di Felici, Leyla Gencer, Renato Bruson, Vincenzo Sagona, Luigi Roni, Renato Cazzaniga	Adolfo Camozzo; Teatro Donizetti di Bergamo Orchestra and Chorus (recording of a performance at Bergamo, 22 September)	CD: Myto 3 Cat: MCD 972 154
1978	Ottavio Garaventa, Leyla Gencer, Renato Bruson, Ferruccio Furlanetto, Franco Signor, Oslavio di Credico	Gianluigi Gelmetti; Teatro La Fenice Orchestra and Chorus (recording of performance at La Fenice)	CD: Mondo Musica; Cat: MFOH 10061
2015	Joyce El-Khoury, Michael Spyres, David Kempster, Brindley Sherratt, Clive Bayley, Wynne Evans	Sir Mark Elder, Orchestra of the Age of Enlightenment, Opera Rara Chorus (studio recording, November 2014)	CD: Opera Rara; Cat: ORC52
