= Il proscritto =

1842 opera by Saverio Mercadante

Il proscritto (The Proscribed Man) is an 1842 opera by Saverio Mercadante to a libretto by Salvadore Cammarano based on the 1839 play Le proscrit by Frédéric Soulié. The premiere took place at the San Carlo Theatre in Naples on January 4, 1842.

It was revived by Opera Rara on 28 June 2022 at the Barbican Hall, London.

== Plot ==
Il proscritto concerns a lost love and political treachery in Scotland during the rule of Oliver Cromwell in the middle of the 17th century. Before the opera begins, Malvina Douglas was married to Giorgio Argyll (a supporter of the Royalist cause); but he was caught up in a shipwreck and was believed dead. Malvina's mother, Anna, and Anna's son by an earlier marriage, Guglielmo Ruthven (a supporter of Cromwell), then encourage her to marry Arturo Murray (also a Cromwellian). The opera opens on the day of Malvina and Arturo's planned wedding.

== Roles ==
- Giorgio Argyll (tenor)
- Arturo Murray (tenor)
- Anna Ruthven (mezzo-soprano)
- William Ruthven, her son (bass)
- Odoardo Douglas (mezzo-soprano) and Malvina Douglas (soprano), children of Anna Ruthven's second marriage
- Clara, Malvina's handmaid (mezzo-soprano)
- Osvaldo, first among the guards of the castle (bass)
- One of Cromwell's officers (bass)
- Dames and knights of the Murray and Ruthven families, outlaws, castle guards, archers

== Recording ==
- 2022: Carlo Rizzi, conductor; Alessandro Fisher (tenor), Elizabeth DeShong (mezzo-soprano), Ivan Ayon-Rivas (tenor), Irene Roberts (mezzo-soprano), Goderdzi Janelidze (bass), Ramón Vargas (tenor), Niall Anderson (bass), Sally Matthews (soprano), Susana Gaspar (soprano); Britten Sinfonia, Opera Rara Chorus. Opera Rara, Catalogue Number: ORC62
