= Albina Shagimuratova =

Russian opera singer

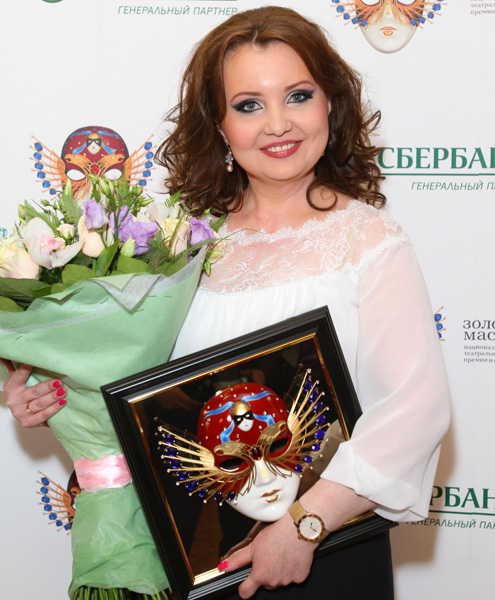
Shagimuratova, receiving the 2012 Golden Mask award

As Lucia in Lucia di Lammermoor, with Houston Grand Opera in 2011

Albina Anvarovna Shagimuratova (Russian: Альбина Анваровна Шагимуратова; born 17 October 1979) is a Russian coloratura soprano. In 2019 her recording of the title role in Semiramide for Opera Rara won the International Opera Awards and the International Classical Music Awards (ICMA), followed by "Neala" in Donizetti's Il paria, again with Mark Elder recorded for Opera Rara. Her worldwide career started at the Salzburg Festival singing the "Queen of the night" in Mozart's Die Zauberflöte, performing at Houston Grand Opera, the Lucerne Festival, San Francisco Opera, Vienna State Opera, Teatro alla Scala, Liceu and The Royal Opera, London. In 2018 Albina recorded the "Queen of the Night" with Yannick Nézet-Séguin for Deutsche Grammophon and performed it in Salzburg, she sang on Moscow's Red Square for the World Cup's opening gala and at the opening of Moscow's new concert hall, Zaryadye both concerts led by Valery Gergiev. 2016 saw her role debut as Konstanze in Mozart's Die Entführung aus dem Serail at the Metropolitan Opera in New York City and the title role in Semiramide at the BBC Proms. Albina Shagimuratova is chair of the jury for the International Glinka Competition and jury member of the International Tchaikovsky Competition.

== Repertoire ==
- Semiramide, Semiramide
- Il paria, Neala
- Die Zauberflöte, Queen of the Night
- Lucia di Lammermoor, Lucia
- Die Entführung aus dem Serail, Konstanze
- La traviata, Violetta
- Mitridate, re di Ponto, Aspasia
- Don Giovanni, Donna Anna
- Rigoletto, Gilda
