= Opera Rara =

London-based opera company and recording label

- Formation: 1970
- Founders: Patric Schmid and Don White
- Type: Opera company
- Location: London
- Artistic director: Carlo Rizzi
- Website: opera-rara.com

Opera Rara is a London-based opera company and recording label which specialises in recording and performing forgotten operatic repertoire from the 19th and early 20th centuries. Founded in 1970 by bel canto enthusiasts Patric Schmid and Don White, Opera Rara's recordings are internationally distributed by Warner Classics. In September 2019, Italian conductor Carlo Rizzi succeeded Sir Mark Elder as artistic director.

== History ==
Opera Rara launched in the 1970s with a series of concerts of 19th-century operatic arias performed at the Southbank Centre, St John's Smith Square and Wigmore Hall in London. The company presented its first complete opera – Meyerbeer's Il crociato in Egitto – in 1972 at the Queen Elizabeth Hall, marking the first performance of the opera for more than 100 years. It subsequently performed at the Bath Festival, Camden Festival (where its first staged production was Donizetti's Le convenienze ed inconvenienze teatrali) and Sadler's Wells. A rise in recordings pirated from BBC Radio 3 broadcasts of Opera Rara performances led to a decision to issue its own recordings. In 1978, it released its first: the world premiere recording of Donizetti's Ugo, conte di Parigi starring Janet Price, Yvonne Kenny, Della Jones and Christian du Plessis. The opera itself had been reconstructed by Patric Schmid from the composer's autograph manuscript.

In July 2018 Opera Rara gave the world premiere of Donizetti's L’Ange de Nisida in collaboration with the Royal Opera House, Covent Garden. A live recording taken from those performances was released in March 2019. The score had been reconstructed over a period of eight years by Italian musicologist Candida Mantica. The first complete staging of L’Ange de Nisida was subsequently given at the 2019 Donizetti Festival in Bergamo.

The company has also performed and recorded works by other 19th-century composers, including Bellini, Massenet, Mayr, Mercadante, Meyerbeer, Pacini, Rossini and Ambroise Thomas. Under artistic director Sir Mark Elder (2011–2019), the company began to explore works by French composers of the same period including Gounod and Offenbach, as well as verismo operas from the turn of the 20th century. In November 2022, Michael Spyres and Ermonela Jaho were announced as Opera Rara's new Artist Ambassadors.

== Performances ==
In recent years, Opera Rara has given annual concert performances of operas either at London's Barbican Centre or The Royal Festival Hall, usually preceded by a week–long recording in the studio. The company has collaborated the BBC Symphony Orchestra, Orchestra of the Age of Enlightenment, the Hallé, Britten Sinfonia and London Philharmonic Orchestra; and with conductors David Parry, Maurizio Benini and Daniele Rustioni. Opera Rara has now worked with Royal Opera House, Covent Garden four times and in addition to past appearances at the Edinburgh International Festival, made its BBC Proms debut with Rossini's Semiramide in 2016. Opera Rara's first international collaboration was in 2019 with the Orquestra de la Comunitat Valenciana.

== Recordings ==
Since 1970, Opera Rara has released over 100 recordings including 60 complete operas – many of which are world premiere recordings – an "Il Salotto" series, artist collections, highlights, anthologies and compilations. Its studio recordings have received awards from the International Opera Awards, International Classical Music Awards, Opus Klassik Awards, Edison Klassiek Awards and Oper! Awards.

Over the years, Opera Rara has established close relationships with a number of singers, including Janet Price, Bruce Ford, Colin Lee, Della Jones, Yvonne Kenny, Jennifer Larmore and Nelly Mircioiu in the early years, and in recent years, Joyce El-Khoury, Michael Spyres, Ermonela Jaho, Albina Shagimuratova and Daniela Barcellona. Opera Rara gave its Patron Renée Fleming her complete opera recording debut in 1994 with the studio recording of Donizetti's Rosmonda d’Inghilterra.

In September 2023, Opera Rara launched the Donizetti Song Project - a multi-year initiative to record and perform all of Donizetti's solo song output, nearly 200 in total. The first recital at London's Wigmore Hall featured Lawrence Brownlee and Carlo Rizzi. The eight recorded volumes include singers Lawrence Brownlee, Nicola Alaimo, Michael Spyres, Marie-Nicole Lemieux, Ermonela Jaho and Rosa Feola.

== Publishing ==
In 2020, Opera Rara announced a new relationship with the Italian publisher Casa Ricordi, making its 47 performing editions of operas available to rent to opera houses and festivals around the world.

The Opera Rara Music Library – now The Foyle Opera Rara Collection – moved to a permanent home at The Royal Welsh College of Music & Drama in 2018. Comprising more than five thousand volumes, the Collection includes first and early editions of 19th-century Italian opera scores by composers such as Rossini, Bellini, Donizetti, Verdi, Puccini, Mayr, Mercadante, Pacini, Ponchielli, Leoncavallo and Mascagni.

== Discography ==
Below are all the operas, listed by composer, of which Opera Rara has produced complete recordings. The recordings indicated by one asterisk (*) are world premiere recordings:

Bellini

- Adelson e Salvini (ORC56)*
- Il pirata (ORC45)
- La straniera (ORC38)*

Donizetti

- Belisario (ORC49)*
- Caterina Cornaro (ORC48)
- Dom Sébastien, roi de Portugal (ORC33)
- Elvida (ORC29)*
- Emilia di Liverpool (ORC8)*
- Francesca di Foix (ORC28)*
- Gabriella di Vergy (ORC3)*
- Il diluvio universale (ORC31)*
- Il paria (ORC60)*
- Imelda de' Lambertazzi (ORC36)*
- La romanzesca e l'uomo nero (ORC19)*
- L'ange de Nisida (ORC58)*
- L'assedio di Calais (ORC9)*
- Le duc d'Albe (ORC54)*
- L'esule di Roma (ORC64)*
- Les Martyrs (ORC52)*
- Linda di Chamounix (ORC43)
- Maria de Rudenz (ORC16)*
- Maria di Rohan (ORC44)*
- Maria Padilla (ORC6)*
- Ne m'oubliez pas (ORC4)*
- Parisina (Donizetti) (ORC40)
- Pia de' Tolomei (ORC30)*
- Rita (ORC50)*
- Roberto Devereux (ORC24)
- Rosmonda d'Inghilterra (ORC13)*
- Ugo, conte di Parigi (ORC1)*
- Zoraida di Granata (ORC17)*

Gounod

- La Colombe (ORC53)

Leoncavallo

- Zazà (ORC55)
- Zingari (ORC61)*

Massenet

- Le Portrait de Manon (ORC47) (includes Berlioz: Les nuits d'été)

Mayr

- Ginevra di Scozia (ORC23)*
- Medea in Corinto (ORC11)

Mercadante

- Emma d'Antiochia (ORC26)*
- Orazi e Curiazi (ORC12)*
- Virginia (ORC39)*
- Il proscritto (ORC62)*

Meyerbeer

- Dinorah (ORC5)*
- Il crociato in Egitto (ORC10)*
- Margherita d'Anjou (ORC25)*

Offenbach

- Christopher Columbus (ORC2)
- Fantasio (ORC51)*
- La Princesse de Trébizonde (ORC63)*
- Robinson Crusoe (ORC7)*
- Vert-Vert (ORC41)*

Pacini

- Alessandro nell'Indie (ORC35)*
- Carlo di Borgogna (ORC21)*
- Maria, regina d'Inghilterra (ORC15)*

Puccini

- Le Willis (ORC59)*

Rossini

- Adelaide di Borgogna (ORC32)
- Aureliano in Palmira (ORC46)*
- Bianca e Falliero (ORC20)*
- Elisabetta, regina d'Inghilterra (ORC22)*
- Ermione (ORC42)
- La donna del lago (ORC34)
- Otello (ORC18)*
- Ricciardo e Zoraide (ORC14)*
- Semiramide (ORC57)
- Zelmira (ORC27)

Thomas

- La cour de Célimène (ORC37)*

Verdi

- Simon Boccanegra (ORC65)* (1857 version)
