= Gaetano Melzi =

Italian bibliographer

Gaetano Melzi (Milan, December 28, 1786 - Milan, September 9, 1851) was an Italian bibliographer and bibliophile.

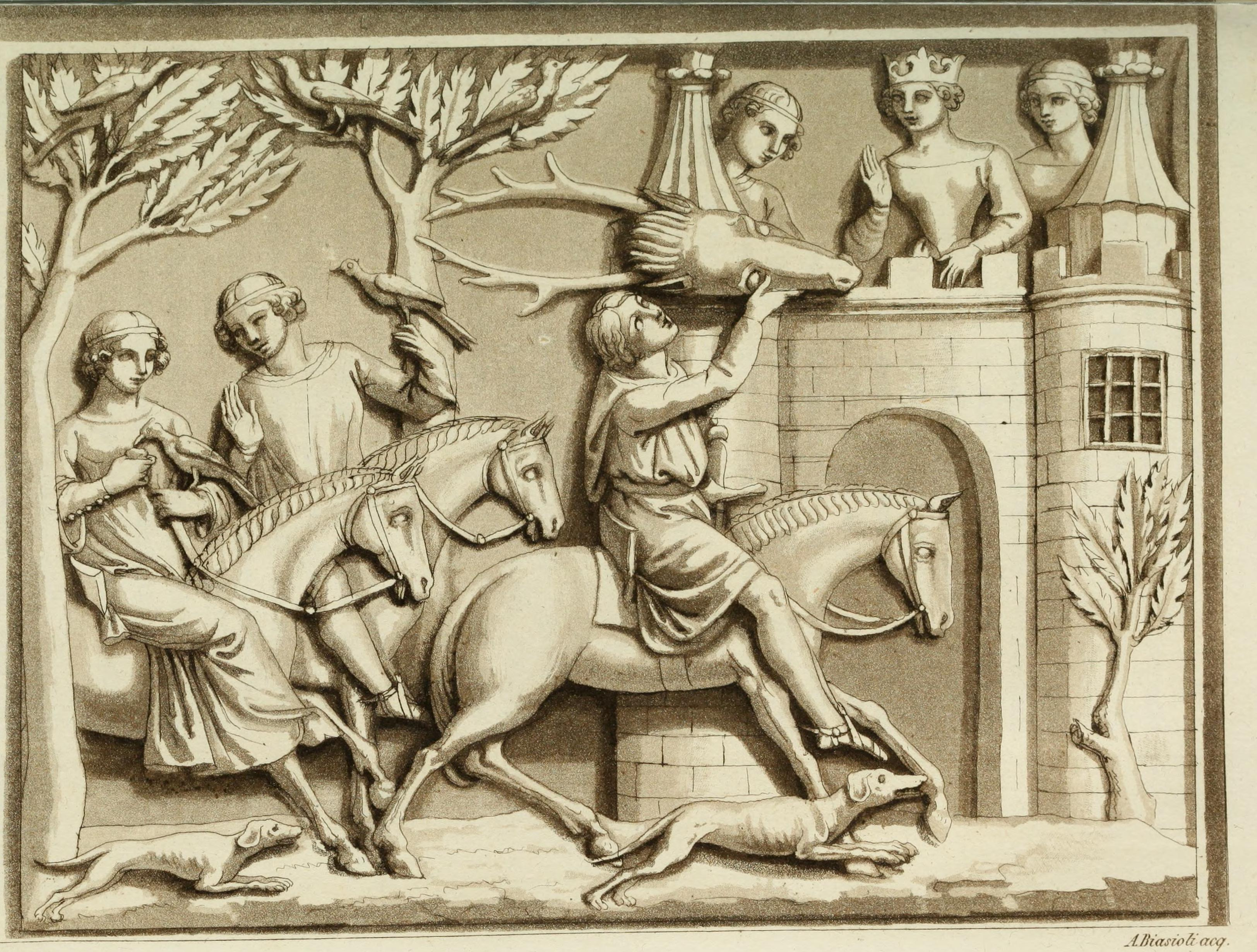
Storia ed analisi degli antichi romanzi di cavalleria e dei poemi romanzeschi d'Italia

== Biography ==
Son of Giuseppe dei Melzi Malingegni and Teresa dei Conti Prata, he was educated in the Collegio dei Nobili of Parma, where he met the Jesuit Juan Andrés, author of Dell'origine, progressi e stato attuale d'ogni letteratura.

His career as a bibliophile began with the collection of incunabula and Greek and Latin classics, which were then dispersed and sold to libraries, such as the Biblioteca Nazionale Braidense, or to private individuals. The part purchased by Frank Hall Standish, a wealthy English collector, including 3500 rare volumes and 250 incunabula, subsequently passed to Louis-Philippe of France, to his son Henri d'Orléans, Duke of Aumale, and after his death became part of the Condé Museum in Chantilly.

Gaetano Melzi later produced two works that have become a working tool for librarians: the "Bibliography of Italian novels and poems of chivalry", and the three volumes of the "Dictionary of anonymous and pseudonymous works of Italian writers", used for the identification of anonymous authors of the past. His library of over 30,000 volumes, inherited in the 1930s by the Meli-Lupi family of Soragna, was gradually dismembered.

Gaetano Melzi was also a passionate music lover: he corresponded with many musicians of his time (including: Rossini, Donizetti, Bellini, Verdi), and left a voluminous correspondence, of considerable interest, currently kept at the Museo Teatrale alla Scala in Milan.

== Bibliography ==
- Marica Roda, «MELZI, Gaetano». In: Dizionario Biografico degli Italiani, Vol. LXXIII, Roma: Istituto della Enciclopedia italiana, 2009
- Tammaro De Marinis, MELZI, Gaetano, in Enciclopedia Italiana, Roma, Istituto dell'Enciclopedia Italiana, 1934. URL consultato il 25 dicembre 2018.

== Related articles ==
- Melzi (Malingegni)

== Sister projects ==
- Wikisource contiene una pagina dedicata a Gaetano Melzi
- Wikimedia Commons contiene immagini o altri file su Gaetano Melzi
