= Maria de Rudenz =

Opera by Gaetano Donizetti

- Opera by Gaetano Donizetti
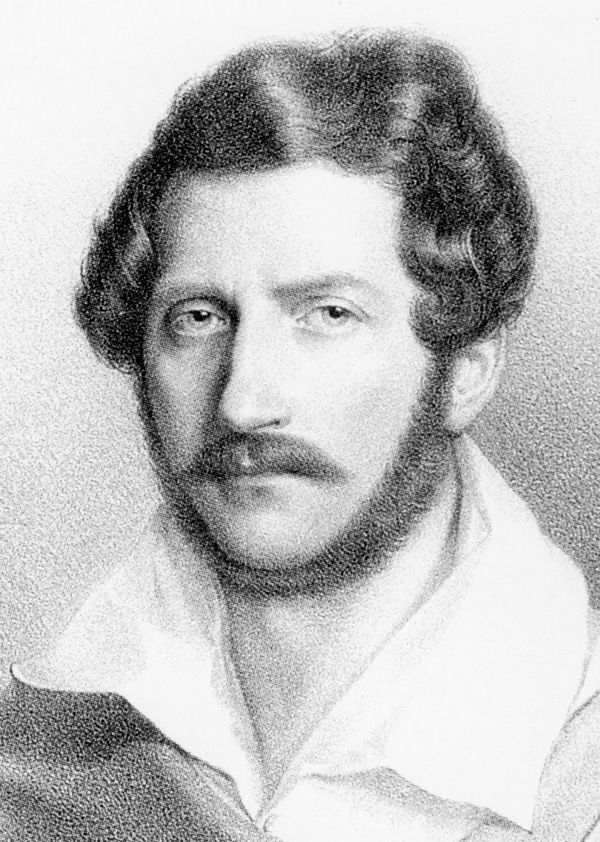
- Gaetano Donizetti c. 1835
- Librettist: Salvadore Cammarano
- Language: Italian
- Premiere: 30 January 1838; La Fenice, Venice

Maria de Rudenz is a dramma tragico, or tragic opera, in three parts by Gaetano Donizetti. The Italian libretto was written by Salvadore Cammarano, based on "a piece of Gothic horror", La nonne sanglante by Auguste Anicet-Bourgeois and Julien de Mallian, and The Monk by Matthew Gregory Lewis. It premiered at La Fenice in Venice, on 30 January 1838.

== Performance history ==
19th century

While the initial performances were not very successful (Donizetti regarded them as "a fiasco"), the opera was withdrawn after two performances. It was given 14 performances in Rome in 1841 but, again, it was received with little enthusiasm. Finally, an "excellent production and superior singing this time won vigorous approval" in a production in Rome in 1841, and this was followed by one in Naples in 1848 at the Teatro Nuovo and three years later for a production at the Teatro San Carlo.

20th century and beyond

The opera did not receive a production in the UK until the Opera Rara concert presentation in London on 27 October 1974. The first staged presentations in the 20th century took place at La Fenice beginning on 21 December 1980 with Katia Ricciarelli in the title role. Both have been recorded. Among other performances, the opera was staged at the Donizetti Festival, Bergamo, in 2013 and by the Wexford Opera Festival in 2016.

In 2024, the opera received its first fully-staged production in the UK by Gothic Opera, with performances at the Battersea Arts Centre, London.

== Roles ==
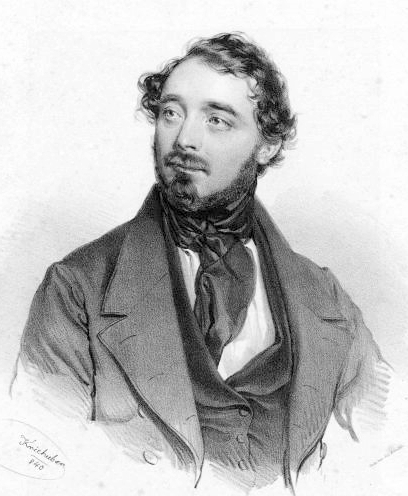
Tenor Napoleone Moriani (by Joseph Kriehuber)

Role	Voice type	Premiere Cast, 30 January 1838 (Conductor: — )
Maria de Rudenz	soprano	Carolina Ungher
Matilde di Wolf, her cousin	soprano	Isabella Casali
Corrado Waldorf	baritone	Giorgio Ronconi
Enrico, his brother	tenor	Napoleone Moriani
Rambaldo, old relative of the Rudenz house	bass	Domenico Raffaeli
The Chancellor of Rudenz	tenor	Alessandro Giacchini
Knights, squires, and vassals of the Rudenz house

== Synopsis ==
Place: Switzerland
Time: 1400

Maria de Rudenz falls in love with Corrado against her father's wishes and flees with him to Venice. In Venice, Corrado suspects that Maria is unfaithful to him, abandons her, returns to Rudenz Castle, and falls in love with Maria's cousin Mathilde.

Maria returns to her ancestor's castle and discovers that her lover is not only going to marry her cousin, but that in fact he is also the son of a murderer. She is ready to keep his secret if only Corrado returns to her. Corrado refuses and in a rage injures her with his sword so that everyone thinks that she is dead.

On the wedding day of Mathilde and Corrado, Maria appears again. Maria reveals Corrado's secret to everyone, murders Mathilde, and commits suicide.

== Recordings ==
Year	Cast: Maria de Rudenz, Matilde di Wolf, Corrado Waldorf, Enrico	Conductor, Opera House and Orchestra	Label
1974	Ludmilla (Milla) Andrew, Merril Jenkins, Christian Du Plessis, Richard Greager	Alun Francis, Philomusica of London and the Opera Rara Chorus, (Recording of a concert performance in the Queen Elizabeth Hall, London, 27 October)	CD: Memories, Cat: HR 4588-4589
1981	Katia Ricciarelli, Silvia Baleani, Leo Nucci, Alberto Cupido	Eliahu Inbal, Orchestra and Chorus of Teatro La Fenice, Venice, (Recorded at the La Fenice, Venice, January)	CD: Fonit Cetra «Italia» Cat: CDC 91; Mondo Musica, Cat: MFOH 10708; Living Stage, Cat: LS 35140
1997	Nelly Miricioiu, Regina Nathan, Robert McFarland, Bruce Ford	David Parry, Philharmonia Orchestra and the Geoffrey Mitchell Choir	CD: Opera Rara, Cat: ORC16
