= Joyce El-Khoury =

Lebanese-Canadian opera singer

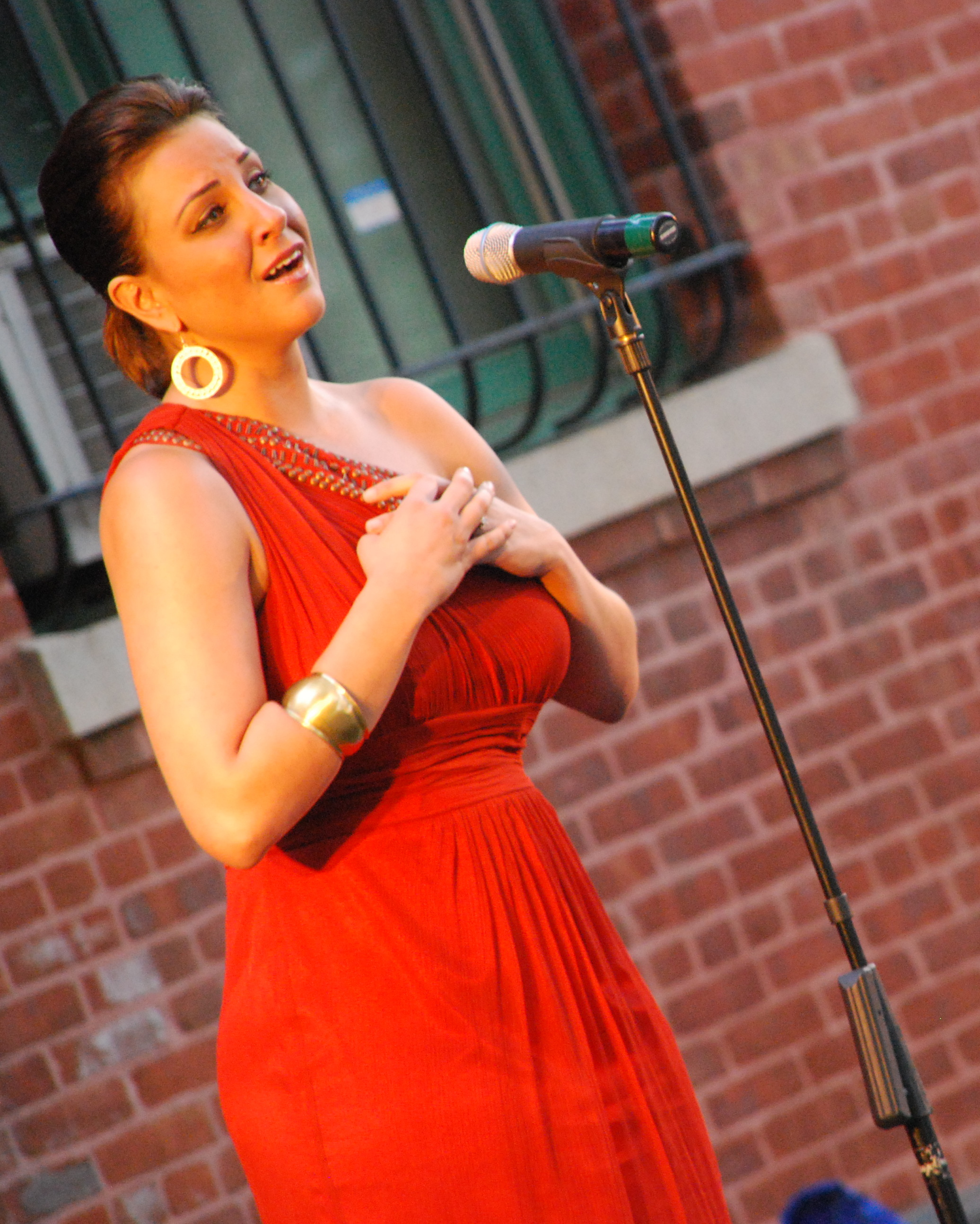
- Portrait of Joyce El-Khoury in New York Metropolitan Opera, performing at Tappan Park, Staten Island.
- Born: Beirut, Lebanon
- Education: Academy of Vocal Arts (AVA)
- Occupation: Operatic soprano
- Years active: 2003–present
- Website: joyceelkhoury.com

Joyce El-Khoury is a Lebanese-Canadian opera singer performing with leading opera companies and symphony orchestras around the world. She is a soprano praised for her bel canto singing.

== Early life and education ==
El-Khoury was born in Beirut, Lebanon, to Jean and Alex El-Khoury. She has two sisters, Cynthia El-Khoury Najm and Krista Jane El-Khoury – the latter also a singer. She came to Ottawa, Ontario, with her family at the age of six, and began taking private voice lessons at the age of 15 with Karen Spicer. With support from her teacher and parents, she pursued voice at the University of Ottawa under the tutelage of Ingemar Korjus. After graduating her Bachelor of Music (Performance) at the University of Ottawa, she pursued her studies at the Academy of Vocal Arts (AVA) in Philadelphia while studying with Bill Schuman. El-Khoury was then invited to study at the Metropolitan Opera's Lindemann Young Artist Development Program while continuing her studies with Schuman. Her musical mentor and vocal coach is Laurent Philippe, with whom she regularly appears in recital.

== Career ==
During the summer of 2010, El-Khoury was engaged by Lorin Maazel and the Castleton Festival to sing Lauretta in Gianni Schicchi and to cover the title role in Suor Angelica. On opening night, she was asked to step in to sing Suor Angelica; this marked the beginning of Maazel's mentorship. She went on to perform Rosina in Rossini's The Barber of Seville in Beijing, Mimì in Puccini's La bohème, the soprano part of Beethoven's Missa Solemnis in Munich and her first Desdemona in Verdi's Otello with Maazel.

She sang Mimì in her Australian debut in 2019 for Opera Australia at the Sydney Opera House.

== Repertory ==
Year	Role	Composer	Opera	Location
2009	Nedda	Ruggiero Leoncavallo	Pagliacci	Knoxville Opera
2010	Frasquita	Georges Bizet	Carmen	Metropolitan Opera
2011	Violetta Valéry	Giuseppe Verdi	La traviata	Knoxville Opera
2012	Violetta Valéry	Giuseppe Verdi	La traviata	Welsh National Opera
2012	Magda	Giacomo Puccini	La rondine	Des Moines Metro Opera
2012	Mimì	Giacomo Puccini	La bohème	Opera Lyra Ottawa
2012	Antonina	Gaetano Donizetti	Belisario	Opera Rara
2013	Violetta Valéry	Giuseppe Verdi	La traviata	Palm Beach Opera
2013	Violetta Valéry	Giuseppe Verdi	La traviata	Opéra Théâtre de Saint-Étienne
2013	Violetta Valéry	Giuseppe Verdi	La traviata	Dutch National Opera
2013	Desdemona	Giuseppe Verdi	Otello	Castleton Festival
2013	Mimì	Giacomo Puccini	La bohème	Canadian Opera Company
2013	Musetta	Giacomo Puccini	La bohème	Canadian Opera Company
2014	Rusalka	Antonín Dvořák	Rusalka	North Carolina Opera
2014	Violetta Valéry	Giuseppe Verdi	La traviata	Korea National Opera
2014	Rusalka	Antonín Dvořák	Rusalka	Concertgebouw
2014	Micaëla	Georges Bizet	Carmen	Santa Fe Opera
2014	Violetta Valéry	Giuseppe Verdi	La traviata	Lyric Opera of Kansas City
2014	Pauline	Gaetano Donizetti	Les martyrs	Opera Rara
2015	Juliette	Charles Gounod	Roméo et Juliette	Austin Opera
2015	Rosalinde	Johann Strauss	Die Fledermaus	Vancouver Opera
2015	Emmeline	Tobias Picker	Emmeline	Opera Theatre of Saint Louis
2015	Violetta Valéry	Giuseppe Verdi	La traviata	Savonlinna Opera Festival
2015	Violetta Valéry	Giuseppe Verdi	La traviata	Canadian Opera Company
2015	Musetta	Giacomo Puccini	La bohème	Bayerische Staatsoper
2016	Tatiana	Pyotr Ilyich Tchaikovsky	Eugene Onegin	North Carolina Opera
2016	Maria Stuarda	Gaetano Donizetti	Maria Stuarda	Seattle Opera
2016	Tatyana Bakst	Jake Heggie	Great Scott	San Diego Opera
2016	Liú	Giacomo Puccini	Turandot	Opera Philadelphia
2016	Salomé	Jules Massenet	Hérodiade	Washington Concert Opera
2017	Violetta Valéry	Giuseppe Verdi	La traviata	Royal Opera House
2017	Leïla	Georges Bizet	Les pêcheurs de perles	Opéra National de Bordeaux
2017	Violetta Valéry	Giuseppe Verdi	La traviata	Glyndebourne
2017	Imogene	Vincenzo Bellini	Il pirata	Opéra National de Bordeaux
2018	Musetta	Giacomo Puccini	La bohème	Teatro Real de Madrid
2018	Imogene	Vincenzo Bellini	Il pirata	Theater St. Gallen

== Recordings ==
- Mirra in Franz Liszt's Sardanapalo with conductor Kirill Karabits and the Staatskapelle Weimar, to be released in 2019, audite
- Antonina in Donizetti's Belisario with conductor Sir Mark Elder with the BBC Symphony Orchestra, released 2012, Opera Rara
- Pauline in Donizetti's Les martyrs with conductor Sir Mark Elder with the Orchestra of the Age of Enlightenment, released 2015, Opera Rara

== Recognition and awards ==
- 2005: First Prize Winner at Brian Law Opera Competition
- 2006: First Prize Winner at Mario Lanza Vocal Competition
- 2006: First Prize Winner and WRTI Radio Audience Favorite at Giargiari and Son Bel Canto Competition
- 2008: First Prize Winner at George London Competition
- 2014: El-Khoury was nominated for Best Young Artist at the International Opera Awards
- 2014: Opera Rara's recording of Donizetti's Belisario with El-Khoury in the role of Antonina was nominated for Best Recording (Complete Opera) at the International Opera Awards
- 2016: Opera Rara's recording of Donizetti's Les martyrs with El-Khoury in the role of Pauline won Best Recording (Complete Opera) at the International Opera Awards
