= Carlo Rizzi (conductor) =

Italian conductor (born 1960)

Carlo Rizzi (born 19 July 1960, Milan, Italy) is an Italian conductor.

== Biography ==
One of three children born to a chemist father and an accountant mother, Rizzi studied music at the Milan Conservatory. He later studied conducting with Vladimir Delman, in Bologna, and with Franco Ferrara in Siena. His opera conducting debut was in 1982, with Donizetti's L'ajo nell'imbarazzo. In 1985, he won the first Toscanini Conductor's Competition in Parma.

Rizzi made his UK conducting debut at the 1988 Buxton Festival with Donizetti's Torquato Tasso, and subsequently conducted productions at the Royal Opera House, Covent Garden and Opera North. In August 1992, he became music director of Welsh National Opera (WNO), and served in the post through 2001. He learned to speak Welsh during his tenure. In 2004, following the sudden resignation of Tugan Sokhiev, Rizzi's successor at WNO, Rizzi returned as WNO's music director, which was expected to be initially for a period of 2 years. He remained in the post through 2007.

In June 2019, Opera Rara announced the appointment of Rizzi as its next music director, effective September 2019. In July 2022, Opera Rara announced an extension of Rizzi's contract as artistic director through June 2025.

Rizzi's recordings include an English-language version of Leoš Janáček's Káťa Kabanová (Chandos), and a DVD set of La Traviata (Deutsche Grammophon).

Rizzi has been married twice. His first marriage, which ended in divorce, produced two children, Steffan and Sofia.

Cultural offices
Preceded by Charles Mackerras	Music Director, Welsh National Opera; 1992-2001	Succeeded by Tugan Sokhiev
Preceded by Tugan Sokhiev	Music Director, Welsh National Opera; 2004-2007	Succeeded by Lothar Koenigs
Preceded by Sir Mark Elder	Artistic Director, Opera Rara; 2019-present	Succeeded by incumbent
