= William Ashbrook =

American musicologist (1922–2009)

William Ashbrook (January 28, 1922 – March 31, 2009) was an American musicologist, writer, journalist, and academic. He was perhaps best noted as a historian, researcher and popularizer of the works of Italian opera composer Gaetano Donizetti.

== Biography ==
Ashbrook was born in Philadelphia, Pennsylvania. He received a Bachelor of Arts degree in English literature from the University of Pennsylvania in 1946, and a Master's degree in musicology from Harvard University in 1947.

Ashbrook began an academic career by teaching humanities and then, for nearly twenty years, was a member of the English Department at Indiana State University at Terre Haute. He retired in 1974 as Distinguished Professor Emeritus. From 1974 to 1984 he was professor of opera at the Philadelphia College of the Performing Arts (now the University of the Arts).

Ashbrook died in Denver, Colorado at the age of 87.

== Ashbrook as opera scholar ==
Although Ashbrook trained to be an English professor, he had a lifelong interest in Italian opera. In reference to his pioneering work in opera scholarship, musicologist Philip Gossett described him as "the father of us all" and his scholarly publications in the field of music far overshadowed his contributions in other areas.

Opera studies were his lifelong passions, especially the life and operas of 19th-century Italian composer Gaetano Donizetti. One result was that "the town of Bergamo, inspired by the local Donizetti Foundation, did itself proud by proclaiming him an honorary citizen of Donizetti's birthplace." He is best remembered for his 1965 biographical work on Donizetti and for the books The Operas of Puccini (1968; rev. 1985) and Donizetti and His Operas (1982), the latter described by Gossett as "for any serious study of a Donizetti opera today, it is with (this book) that one must begin".

Ashbrook was also a regular contributor to several classical music journals, magazines, and other publications, including Opera News, Opera, Donizetti Society Journal and the Grove Dictionary of Music and Musicians. He was editor of Opera Quarterly from 1993 to 1997.

== Publications ==
- Donizetti, London: Cassell (1965). ISBN 978-8870630411
- The Operas of Puccini, Oxford University Press, 1968 ISBN 978-0195003949 (Revised 1985): Cornell University Press ISBN 0801493099, 0-8014-9309-9
- Donizetti and His Operas, Cambridge University Press (1982). ISBN 052123526X, 0-521-23526-X
- (with others) The New Grove Masters of Italian Opera: Rossini, Donizetti, Bellini, Verdi, Puccini, W. W. Norton & Co Inc. (1983). ISBN 0393300897, 0-393-30089-7
