= Mark Elder =

British conductor (born 1947)

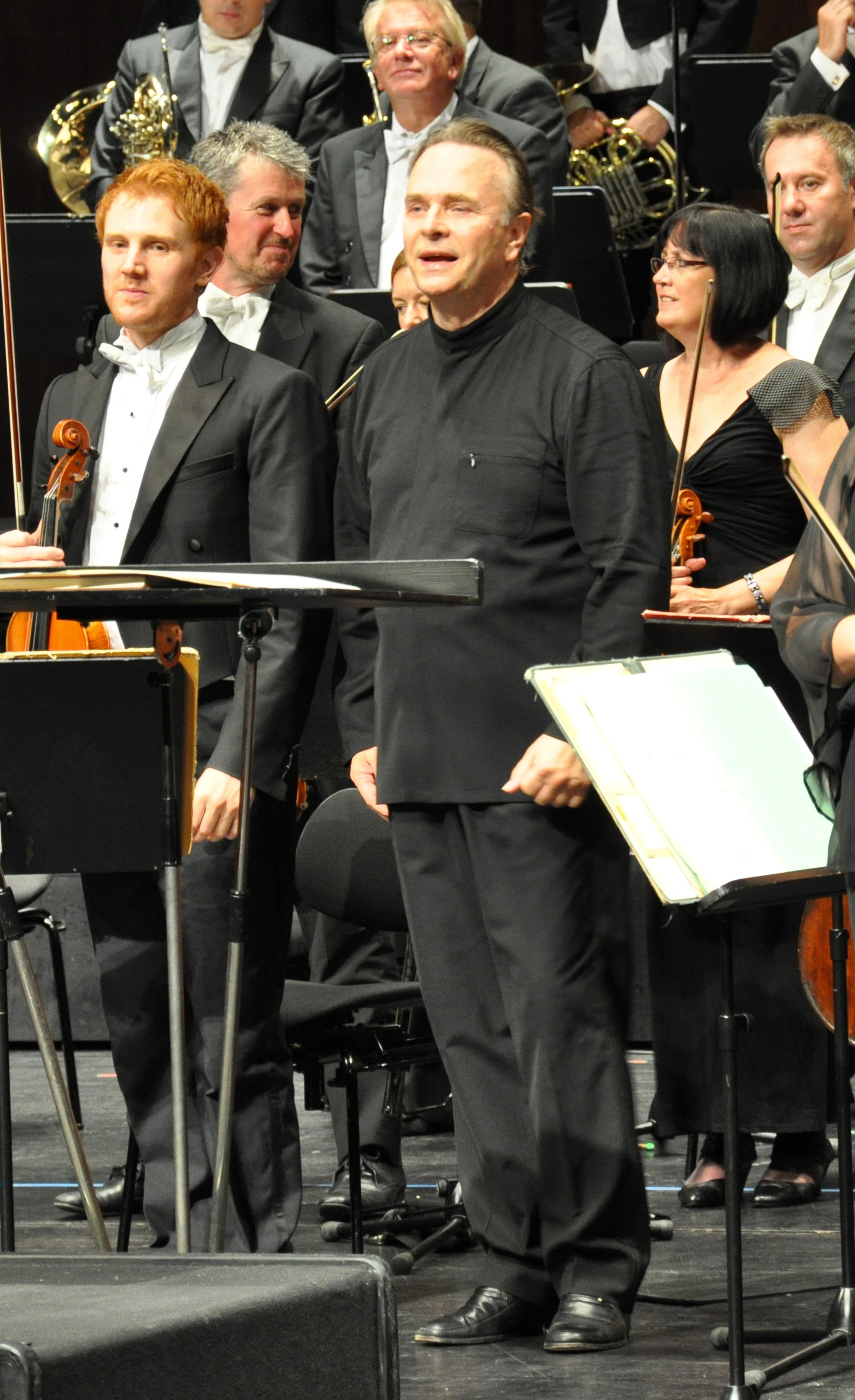
Mark Elder in 2011

Sir Mark Philip Elder CH, CBE (born 2 June 1947) is a British conductor with wide experience in the opera house as music director of English National Opera and at Covent Garden and in the concert hall, serving for over 20 years as music director of the Hallé Orchestra.

== Life and career ==
Elder was born in Hexham, Northumberland, the son of a dentist. He played the bassoon when in primary school, at Bryanston School, Dorset, and in the National Youth Orchestra, where he was one of the foremost musicians (bassoon and keyboard) of his generation. He attended Corpus Christi College, Cambridge as a choral scholar, where he studied music. He later became a protégé of Sir Edward Downes and gained experience conducting Verdi operas (as well as Prokofiev's War and Peace and Wagner's Meistersinger) in Australia, at the Sydney Opera House.

=== Early career ===
Elder made his debut at the Royal Opera House Covent Garden in 1976 with Rigoletto, and returned 50 years later to conduct the same opera, conducting regularly in the preceding years, initially other Verdi operas - Simon Boccanegra, Nabucco, Luisa Miller, La battaglia di Legnano, Attila, Stiffelio, Alzira - widening into repertoire such as Arabella, La Cenerentola, Lohengrin, Cyrano de Bergerac, Elektra, I Capuleti e i Montecchi, Linda di Chamounix, Adriana Lecouvreur, Fidelio, The Tsar's Bride, Wozzeck and L'Étoile.

From 1979 to 1993, Elder was music director of English National Opera (ENO). Elder was part of the "Power House" team at ENO that also included general director Peter Jonas and artistic director David Pountney. He also held positions as principal guest conductor of the BBC Symphony Orchestra (1982–1985) and the London Mozart Players (1980–1983). Elder served as principal guest conductor of the City of Birmingham Symphony Orchestra from 1992 to 1995. In the USA, Elder was music director of the Rochester Philharmonic Orchestra from 1989 to 1994.

=== The Hallé years ===
Elder was appointed music director of The Hallé in 1999. His first concert as music director was in October 2000. He proposed several novel ideas for concerts. These have included the abandonment of traditional concert evening garb.

Elder is generally regarded as having restored The Hallé to high musical standards, after a period where its continuing existence was in doubt. In 2004, he signed a contract to extend his tenure from 2005 to 2008, with an optional two-year extension at the end of that time. A 2005 report indicated Elder's intention to remain with the orchestra until at least 2010.

In May 2009, the orchestra announced the extension of Elder's contract to 2015. In November 2013, The Hallé announced the further extension of Elder's contract through "at least 2020". In February 2023, Elder stated his intention to stand down as music director of The Hallé at the close of the 2023–2024 season. Elder concluded his tenure with The Hallé at the end of the 2023–2024 season and is now its conductor emeritus.

=== Additional career ===
Elder became a principal artist of the Orchestra of the Age of Enlightenment in December 2011. From 2011 to 2019, Elder was artistic director of Opera Rara. Elder has been president of the London Philharmonic Choir since 2014 and is currently the Royal Academy of Music's Barbirolli Chair of Conducting. In November 2021, the Bergen Philharmonic Orchestra announced the appointment of Elder as its next principal guest conductor, effective from 1 August 2022, with an initial contract of three years through 31 July 2025.

Elder first guest-conducted the Orquestra de la Comunitat Valenciana in 2022. In January 2025, the Orquestra de la Comunitat Valenciana announced the appointment of Elder as its next music director, effective 1 September 2025, with an initial contract of two years.

=== Public pronouncements ===
Elder first conducted the Last Night of the Proms in 1987. He was scheduled to conduct again in 1990, but his remarks in an interview in Evening Standard a week before the performance about potentially changing the programme if Britain had engaged in the first Gulf War led to him being replaced in favour of Andrew Davis.

In 2006, he returned to conduct the BBC Symphony Orchestra for his second "Last Night" engagement, and used the traditional speech at the end of the concert to criticise aircraft baggage restrictions, in place following the uncovering of the 2006 transatlantic aircraft plot, which have made it difficult for musicians to carry their instruments on aircraft. In a reference to the fact that laptop computers are now allowed in aircraft cabins, Elder said, "...it seems to me that next year we should all look forward to 'Concerto for Laptop and Orchestra'." He made a plea for children to be given more opportunity to sing at school.

=== Honours ===
Elder was appointed Commander of the Order of the British Empire (CBE) in the 1989 Queen's Birthday Honours. He won an Olivier Award in 1991 for his outstanding work at English National Opera. He received the 2006 conductor prize of the Royal Philharmonic Society. In April 2007, Elder was one of eight conductors of British orchestras to endorse the 10-year classical music outreach manifesto, "Building on Excellence: Orchestras for the 21st Century", to increase the presence of classical music in the UK, including giving free entry to all British schoolchildren to a classical music concert. He was awarded Companionship of the Royal Northern College of Music in Manchester in 2016.

Elder was knighted in the Queen's Birthday Honours of June 2008. He was appointed Member of the Order of the Companions of Honour (CH) in the 2017 Birthday Honours for services to music.

=== Style ===
Describing his own conducting style, Elder has said that in contrast to Sir Adrian Boult, who was famously non-perspirational:

I'm quite a physical conductor. I remember seeing Adrian Boult backstage after the 1978 Proms and he was wearing a freshly ironed light blue M&S shirt and he said to me "I see you're one of the sweaty ones".

=== Recordings and writing ===
Elder has recorded for the Hyperion, NMC, Chandos, Opera Rara, and Glyndebourne record labels, as well as for the Hallé Orchestra's own label. In addition to his conducting and recording activities, Elder also has written on music for The Guardian and other newspapers.

== Personal life ==
Elder and his wife, Mandy, have a daughter, Katie.

Cultural offices
Preceded by Charles Groves	Music Director, English National Opera; 1979–1993	Succeeded by Sîan Edwards
Preceded by James Gaffigan	Music Director, Orquestra de la Comunitat Valenciana; 2025–present	Succeeded by incumbent
