= Seveste =

Seveste is a surname. Notable people with the surname include:

- Jacqueline Seveste (1844–1927), French opera singer
- Jules Seveste (1803–1854), French playwright and theatre manager
