= Reigen =

Reigen may refer to:

- Reigen (play) or La Ronde, a 1900 play by Arthur Schnitzler
  - Reigen (film), a 1973 adaptation directed by Otto Schenk
  - Reigen (opera), a 1993 adaptation by Philippe Boesmans
- Emperor Reigen, 112th emperor of Japan
- Reigen, spin-off manga of Mob Psycho 100.
- Reigen (singer) (born 1985), American singer-songwriter
