= Yvonne, princesse de Bourgogne =

Opera by Philippe Boesmans

- Opera by Philippe Boesmans
- Librettist: Luc Bondy
- Language: French
- Based on: Iwona, księżniczka Burgunda by Witold Gombrowicz
- Premiere: 2009; Paris Opera

Yvonne, princesse de Bourgogne is a 2009 opera by Philippe Boesmans to a libretto by Swiss dramatist and director Luc Bondy based on the anti-conformist play Iwona, księżniczka Burgunda by Witold Gombrowicz. Yvonne is the fourth in a series of operas with librettos by Luc Bondy, and the first of the four to be written in French not German. The libretto for Boesmans' subsequent French opera, Au monde (2014), was provided by Joël Pommerat.

== Recordings ==
- Dorte Lyssewski (Yvonne), Mireille Delunsch (Le Reine Marguerite), Paul Gay (Le Roi Ignace), Yann Beuron (Le Prince Philippe), Victor von Halem (Le Chambellan), Hannah Esther Minutillo (Isabelle), Jason Bridges (Cyrille), Jean-Luc Ballestra (Cyprien), Guillaume Antoine (Innocent), Marc Cossu-Leaonian (Valentin) Klangforum Wien, Sylvain Cambreling, Cypres. The recording was awarded Diapason d'or by the French music magazine Diapason.

== See also ==
- Yvonne, Prinzessin von Burgund, opera in four acts by Boris Blacher
