= Chloé Briot =

French soprano (born 1987)

Chloé Briot (born 18 November 1987) is a French operatic soprano.

== Life ==
Briot was born in Mayenne of parent teachers. She started playing percussion at the age of 4, then started playing the flute and took dance lessons. At the age of 14, the singing teacher at the city's conservatory decided to accept her into her class even though she was too young for the age requirement. She then studied at the Conservatoire de Paris from 2006 onwards, which she left afterwards, judging the atmosphere "too academic". She then went on to study at the Aix-en-Provence Festival, of which she was a laureate in 2014.

In 2018, she was nominated in the "Lyric Artist" category in the Victoires de la musique classique.

In August 2020, she announced that she had filed a complaint for sexual assault.

== Opera ==
- 2014 : Jenůfa by Leoš Janáček, directed by Alvis Hermanis
- 2015 : Alcina by Haendel, directed by Pierre Audi
- 2015 : The Magic Flute by Mozart, directed by Pet Halmen
- 2015 : Le Roi Carotte by Jacques Offenbach, directed by Laurent Pelly
- 2016 : Pelléas et Mélisande by Claude Debussy, directed by René Koering
- 2016 : Lakmé by Léo Delibes, directed by Lilo Baur
- 2016 : Pelléas et Mélisande, directed by Katie Mitchell
- 2016 : Pelléas et Mélisande, directed by Stéphane Braunschweig
- 2017 : Little Nemo by David Chaillou, directed by Olivier Balazuc and Arnaud Delalande
- 2017 : Pinocchio by Philippe Boesmans, directed by Joël Pommerat
- 2018 : La Légende du Roi Dragon by Arthur Lavandier, directed by Johanne Saunier
- 2018 : Pelléas et Mélisande, directed by Stefan Herheim
- 2018 : A Midsummer Night's Dream by Felix Mendelssohn, Juliette Deschamps
- 2019 : The Magic Flute, directed by Robert Carsen
- 2019 : L’Inondation by Francesco Filidei, directed by Joël Pommerat
