= Stéphane Degout =

French opera singer

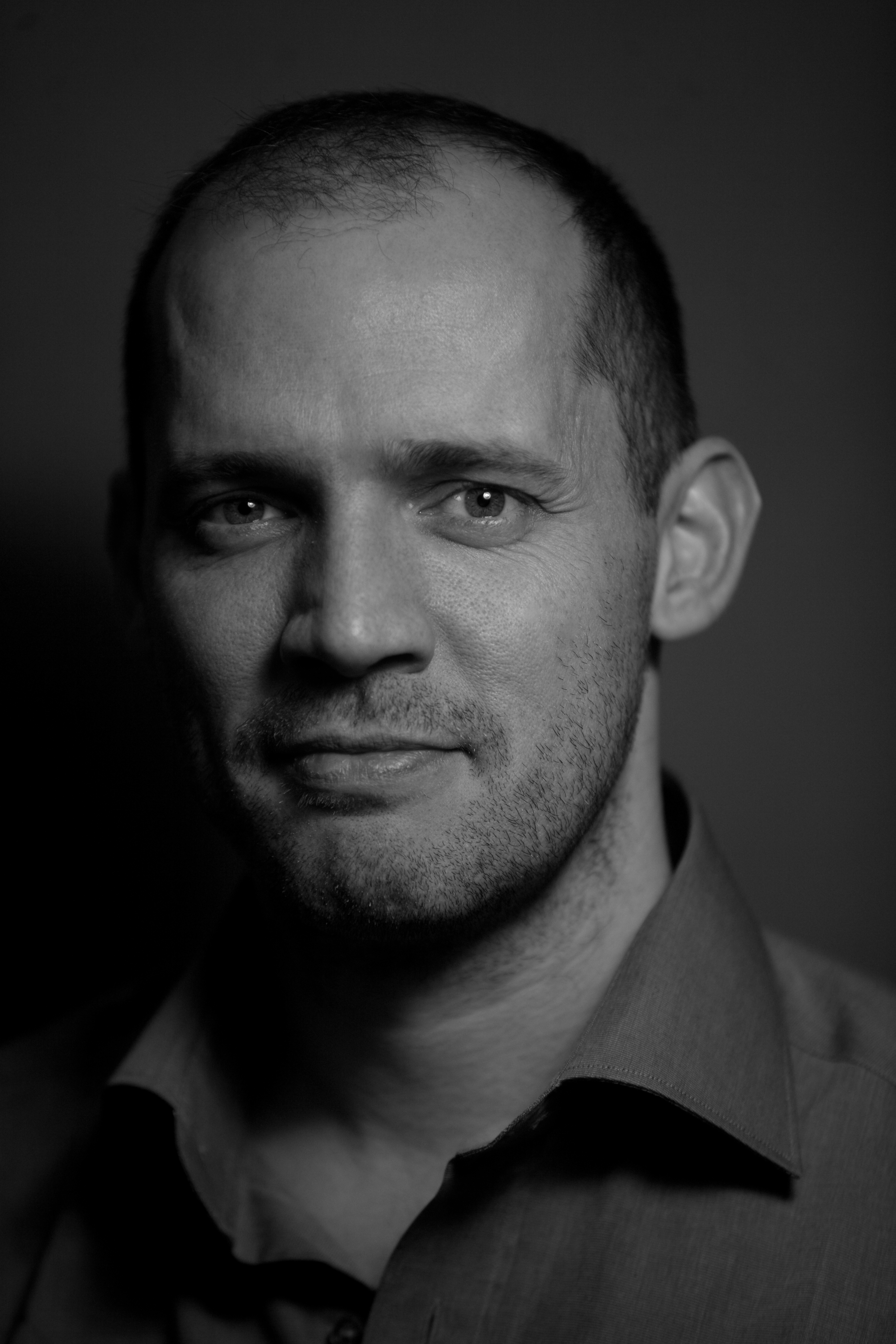
Stéphane Degout

Stéphane Degout (born 9 June 1975 in Bourg-en-Bresse) is a contemporary French baritone. He grew up in Saint-Jean-de-Niost (Ain) and has been living in Lyon since 1995.

== Biography ==
Trained at the lycée Saint-Exupéry in Lyon, the Conservatoire national supérieur de musique et de danse de Lyon in the class of Margreet Honig, then within the troupe of the opéra national de Lyon, Degout began his career in the role of Papageno in The Magic Flute, within the framework of the Académie européenne de musique of the Aix-en-Provence Festival in July 1998. He particularly attended the master classes of Régine Crespin, Gundula Janowitz, Graziella Sciutti and Claudio Desderi. He has been following Gary Magby's teaching from 1998.

Since then, he has been performing a varied repertoire at the Opéra national de Lyon, the Paris Opera, the Opéra-Comique, the Théâtre des Champs Elysées, the Théâtre Royal de la Monnaie in Brussels, the Opéra national de Montpellier, the Berlin State Opera, the Royal Opera House, Covent Garden in London, the Teatro alla Scala de Milan, the Metropolitan Opera of New York, the Lyric Opera of Chicago, the Theater an der Wien, the Dutch National Opera, the Aix-en-Provence International Lyric Art Festival, the Glyndebourne Festival Opera, the Edinburgh Festival, the Salzburg festival, the Verbier Festival, the Chorégies d'Orange, the Ravinia Festival, the Los Angeles Philharmonic, under the direction of René Jacobs, William Christie, Christophe Rousset, Emmanuelle Haïm, Marc Minkowski, Ivor Bolton, Bertrand de Billy, Sylvain Cambreling, Michel Plasson, Georges Prêtre, Jesus Lopez Cobos, Charles Dutoit, Kirill Petrenko, Pinchas Steinberg, Philippe Jordan, Daniel Harding, Simon Rattle, Riccardo Muti, Esa-Pekka Salonen, Raphaël Pichon and with the directors Stéphane Braunschweig, Laurent Pelly, Robert Carsen, Patrice Chéreau, Klaus Michael Grüber, Trisha Brown, Robert Wilson, Barrie Kosky, Torsten Fischer, Krzysztof Warlikowski, Olivier Py, Pierre Audi, Joël Pommerat, Katie Mitchell.

He participated in the world premiere of the opera La Dispute (after Marivaux) by Benoît Mernier in March 2013 and also at the premiere of Philippe Boesmans's operas, Au monde in March/April 2014 at La Monnaie, Pinocchio in July 2017 at the Aix-en-Provence Festival and Lessons in Love and Violence by George Benjamin.

Degout works on the repertoire of "lied" and the French melodie with Ruben Lifschitz and performs regularly in recital with pianists Hélène Lucas, Simon Lepper, Michaël Guido, Alain Planès and Cédric Tiberghien in Paris, Lyon, Montpellier, Toulouse, Bordeaux, Strasbourg, Rouen, Grenoble, Lille, Nantes, Tours, Brussels, London, Edinburg, Berlin, Francfurt, Amsterdam, Venice, Rome, Vienna, New York and Chicago. He has recorded a first disc Mélodie for the Naïve Records label.

He has been represented since the beginning of his career by Peter Wiggins, Sofia Surgutchowa and Myriam Gamichon within IMG Artists, Paris.

Alongside filmed versions of L'Orfeo (2007), La Bohème (2008, voice only), and Faust (2019), he appeared in the funeral scene of a 2013 film Grand départ singing "O du, mein holder Abendstern".

=== Prizes ===
- 2012: Lyric artist of the year of the Victoires de la musique classique
- 2006: Gabriel Dussurget Prize, Aix-en-Provence Festival
- 2002: Second prize in the Placido Domingo competition/Operalia
- 1998: Fifth prize in the France Télécom competition "Les Voix nouvelles"

=== Distinction ===
- 24 September 2012: Named chevalier in the ordre des Arts et des Lettres

== Repertoire (opera, recital and oratorio) ==
- Johann Sebastian Bach: Jesus, St Matthew Passion
- Hector Berlioz: Claudio, Béatrice et Bénédict; Chorèbe, Les Troyens
- Benjamin Britten: Junius, The Rape of Lucretia; Novice’s friend, Billy Budd; Sid, Albert Herring
- Philippe Boesmans: Ori, Au monde (premiere 2014); The director of the troupe, Pinocchio (premiere 2017)
- Johannes Brahms: Requiem
- Marc-Antoine Charpentier: Oronte, Médée
- Ernest Chausson: Poème de l'amour et de la mer
- Francesco Bartolomeo Conti: Don Chisciotte, Don Chisciotte in Sierra Morena
- François Couperin: Ariane Consolée par Bacchus
- Claude Debussy: Pelléas, Golaud, Pelléas et Mélisande
- Gabriel Fauré: Requiem
- Christoph Willibald Ritter von Gluck: Oreste, Iphigénie en Tauride; Le Grand Prêtre et Herlcule, Alceste
- Charles Gounod: Mercutio, Roméo et Juliette
- Joseph Haydn: Orlando, Orlando Paladino
- Erich Wolfgang Korngold: Franck et Fritz, Die tote Stadt
- Ruggero Leoncavallo: Silvio, Pagliacci
- Gustav Mahler: des Knaben Wunderhorn, Kindertotenlieder
- Jules Massenet: Albert, Werther
- Felix Mendelssohn: Elijah, Elijah
- Benoît Mernier: The Prince, La Dispute (premiere)
- Olivier Messiaen: Frère Léon, Saint François d'Assise
- Claudio Monteverdi: Orfeo, L'Orfeo; Ulisse, Il ritorno d'Ulisse in patria
- Mozart: Papageno, Die Zauberflöte; Guglielmo, Così fan tutte; Conte Almaviva, Le Nozze di Figaro; Don Giovanni, Don Giovanni
- Jacques Offenbach: Jupiter, Orphée aux Enfers
- Giacomo Puccini: Schaunard, La Bohème
- Jean-Philippe Rameau: Borilée and Adamas, Les Boréades; Adario, les Indes Galantes; Thésée, Hippolyte et Aricie
- Maurice Ravel: l’Horloge et le Chat, L'Enfant et les Sortilèges
- Gioachino Rossini: Dandini, La Cenerentola; Raimbaud, Le Comte Ory
- Johann Strauss II: Gabriel von Eisenstein, La Chauve-Souris
- Richard Strauss: Harlekin, Ariadne auf Naxos
- Ambroise Thomas: Hamlet, Hamlet
- Richard Wagner: Wolfram von Eschenbach, Tannhäuser
- Mélodies and Lieder by Hector Berlioz, Johannes Brahms, Ernest Chausson, Claude Debussy, Henri Duparc, Gabriel Fauré, Franz Liszt, Gustav Mahler, Francis Poulenc, Maurice Ravel, Franz Schubert, Robert Schumann, Richard Strauss, Hugo Wolf.
