= Robin Adams (baritone) =

English lyric baritone

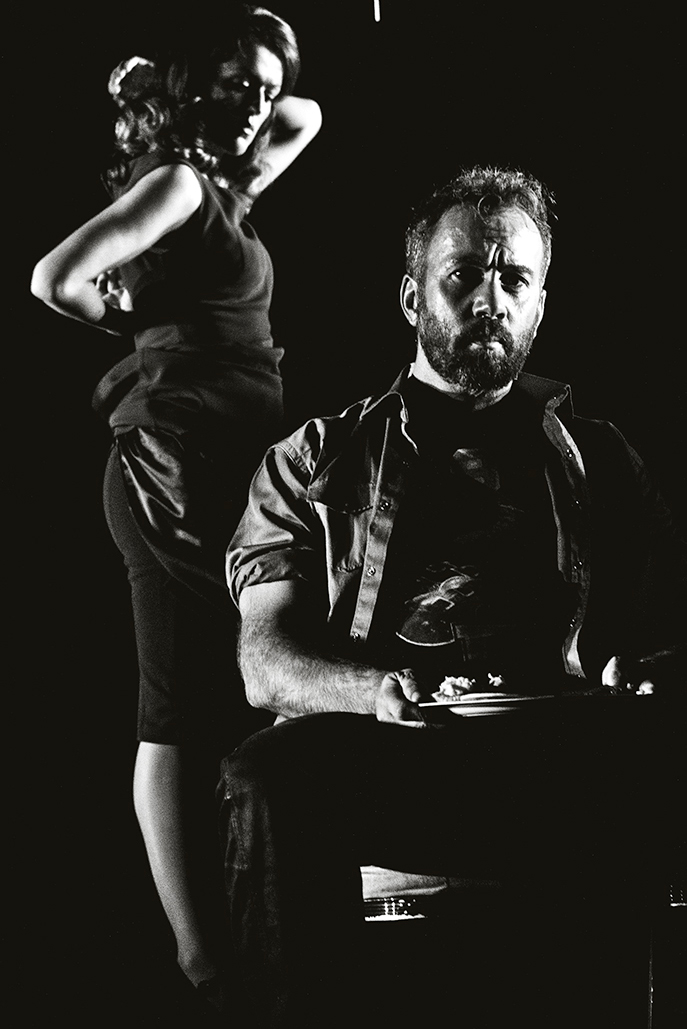
Claudia Boyle and Robin Adams, The Last Hotel by Enda Walsh and Donnacha Dennehy, Edinburgh International Festival 2015

Robin Adams is an English lyric baritone, a classical singer who has appeared in several major opera houses and concert halls.

== Life and career ==
Adams studied singing with Patricia MacMahon and Peter Alexander Wilson as well as piano and cello at the Royal Scottish Academy of Music & Drama in Glasgow and later on with Carol Blaickner-Mayo in Vienna. He won several awards and scholarships and started his career in 1996 singing the Ferryman in Curlew River by Benjamin Britten at the Edinburgh International Festival and at a Japan tour. Two other Britten roles – Billy Budd and Tarquinius in The Rape of Lucretia – paved his way to Glasgow and Vienna. Thereafter he was invited by the Wiener Kammeroper to sing in Strauss and Mozart productions.

After his successful Malatesta debut at the Landestheater Linz in 1999, Adams was invited to join the ensemble of this traditional Austrian opera company. He remained in Linz for two years singing principal parts from all eras of opera history. In 2002, Adams was invited to Stadttheater Bern, he moved to Switzerland and stayed there till today. His repertoire is very broad, it reaches from Claudio Monteverdi to contemporary classical music to Operetta, Pop and Musical. In Bern he has been performing in leading opera roles, but has also succeeded with a program called No opera allowed. He has taught singing at the Swiss Musical Academy as well as at the London College of Music and has also been invited to major opera houses of Europa and South America. At the Frankfurt Opera House he sang Traveller, Don Cassandro and Schaunard, at the Parisian Théâtre du Châtelet he debuted as Captain in Die Bassariden by Hans Werner Henze. At the Oper Leipzig he performed as Danilo and he is a frequent guest at the Theater Augsburg, the Theatre de la Monnaie in Bruxelles, the Teatro Liceo in Barcelone and the Edinburgh International Festival.

As a noted performer of contemporary music, his appearances have included Blazes (in The Lighthouse by Peter Maxwell Davies) for La Monnaie and Muziektheater Transparant, as well as Antigonus and Pickpocket II (in Boesmans' Wintermärchen) at the Liceu. He also took part in a series of world premieres:

- in 2000 as Kunstenaar Beck in Triumph of Spirit over Matter by Johan Thielemans and Wim Henderickx for La Monnaie,
- in 2004 as Leonce in Leonce and Lena by Georg Büchner and Christian Henking for Theater Bern,
- in 2011 as Vicomte De Valmont in Quartett by Heiner Müller and Luca Francesconi at the Scala of Milano and
- in 2015 as Husband in The Last Hotel by Enda Walsh and Donnacha Dennehy at the Edinburgh International Festival.

The original Quartett production by La Fura dels Baus from La Scala was since seen at Wiener Festwochen in Vienna, at Cité de la Musique in Paris, at Opéra de Lille and at the Holland Festival. In 2015 the production was presented at the Gulbenkian in Lisboa. In June 2015, Adams sang this role also at the Teatro Colón in Buenos Aires.

Adams is also active as a concert singer. He sang Alexander Zemlinsky's Lyric Symphony with the Moscow Symphony Orchestra, Bach's Magnificat with the English Chamber Orchestra at the Barbican in London and a recital of Hugo Wolf in Wolf's birth house. His concert repertoire also includes works by Henry Purcell, Handel's Messiah, Orff's Carmina Burana, Brahms' Deutsches Requiem, as well as Bach Cantatas and Passions and Mahler's Das klagende Lied.

== Roles ==
Composer	Work	Role
Ludwig van Beethoven	Fidelio	Don Pizarro
Vincenzo Bellini	I puritani	Riccardo
Alban Berg	Wozzeck	Wozzeck
Leonard Bernstein	West Side Story	Tony
Georges Bizet	La jolie fille de Perth	Duc de Rothsay
Philippe Boesmans	Wintermärchen	Antigonus/Pickpocket II
Benjamin Britten	Peter Grimes	Balstrode
	Billy Budd	Billy Budd
	A Midsummer Night's Dream	Demetrius
	The Rape of Lucretia	Tarquinius
	Curlew River	Ferryman, Traveller
Marc-Antoine Charpentier	Médée	Oronte
Peter Maxwell Davies	The Lighthouse	Blazes
Donnacha Dennehy	The Last Hotel (World premiere)	Husband
Gaetano Donizetti	L'elisir d'amore	Belcore
	Lucia di Lammermoor	Enrico
	Don Pasquale	Malatesta
Luca Francesconi	Quartett (World premiere)	Vicomte De Valmont
Christoph Willibald Gluck	Armide	Le Chevalier Danois
Wim Henderickx	Triumph of Spirit over Matter (World premiere)	Kunstenaar Beck
Christian Henking	Leonce and Lena (World premiere)	Leonce
Hans Werner Henze	Die Bassariden	Captain
Leoš Janáček	The Cunning Little Vixen	Forester
Erich Wolfgang Korngold	Die tote Stadt	Frank/Fritz
Franz Lehár	Die lustige Witwe	Danilo
Jules Massenet	Manon	Lescaut
Claudio Monteverdi	Il ritorno d'Ulisse in patria	Ulisse
Wolfgang Amadeus Mozart	La finta semplice	Cassandro
	Le nozze di Figaro	Count Almaviva
	Don Giovanni	Don Giovanni
	Così fan tutte	Guglielmo
	Die Zauberflöte	Papageno
Giacomo Puccini	La bohème	Marcello, Schaunard
	Madama Butterfly	Sharpless
Gioachino Rossini	Il barbiere di Siviglia	Figaro
	La Cenerentola	Dandini
Johann Strauss	Die Fledermaus	Falke, Eisenstein
Richard Strauss	Der Rosenkavalier	Faninal
	Arabella	Graf Dominik
Igor Stravinsky	The Rake's Progress	Nick Shadow
Pyotr Ilyich Tchaikovsky	Eugene Onegin	Eugene Onegin
Giuseppe Verdi	Macbeth	Macbeth
	La traviata	Germont
	Falstaff	Ford
Richard Wagner	Tannhäuser	Wolfram
	Das Rheingold	Donner

== Discography ==
- Lieder und Klavierwerke by Walter Courvoisier, with Jeannine Hirzel (soprano) and Edward Rushton (piano accompaniment)

== Accolades ==
- Silver Medal of the Worshipful Company of the City of London
- Countess of Munster Scholarship, dedicated by Dame Janet Baker
- Lied Award of the Royal Academy
