= Charlotte Salomon (opera) =

Opera by Marc-André Dalbavie

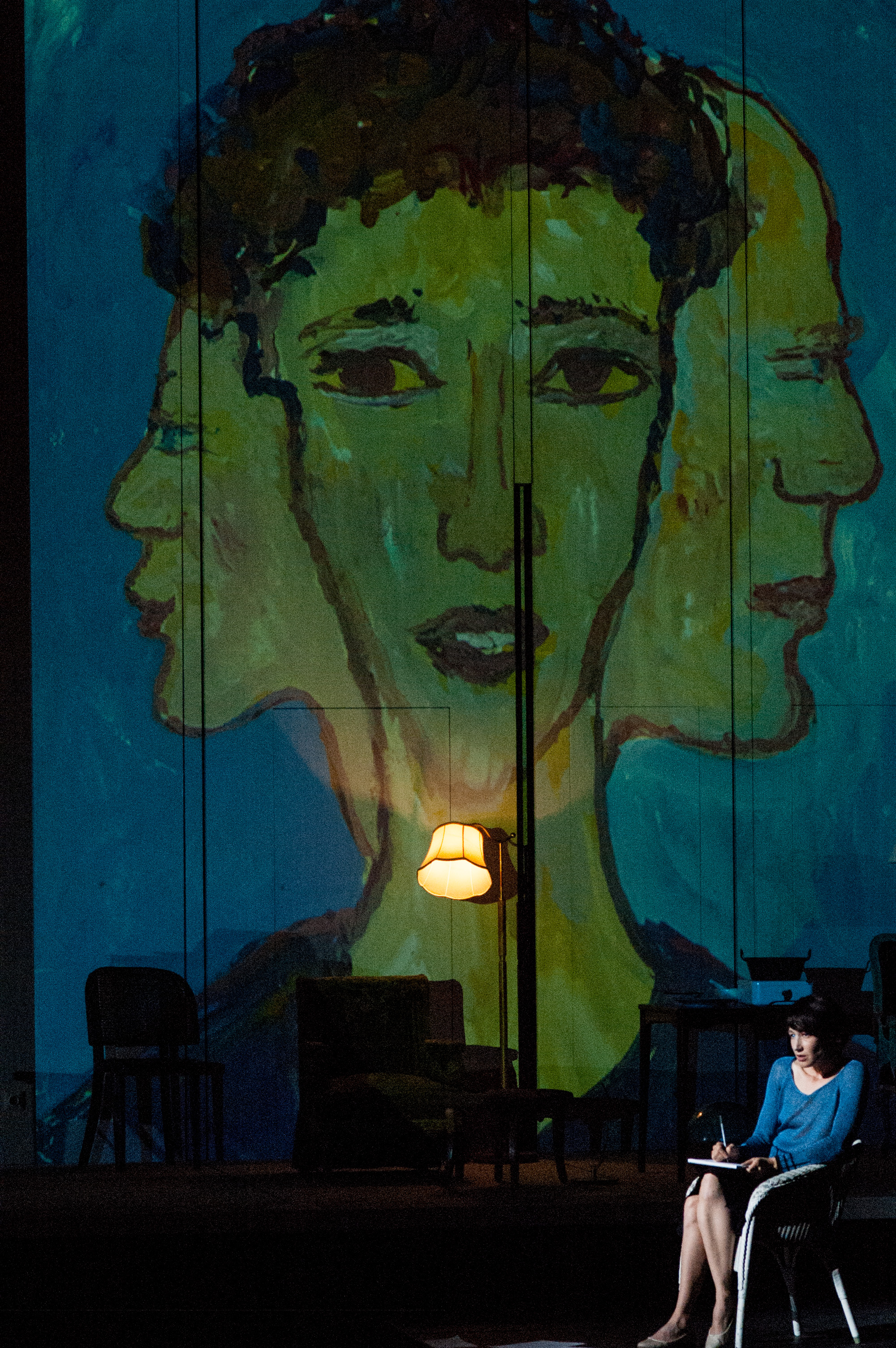
Charlotte Salomon, World Premiere at the Salzburg Festival 2014

Charlotte Salomon is an opera by Marc-André Dalbavie. The libretto is by Barbara Honigmann (portions translated into French by Johannes Honigmann) who based much of it on Charlotte Salomon's autobiographical and posthumous work Leben? Oder Theater? The opera was first performed at the Salzburg Festival on July 28, 2014.

== Composition ==
The nature of Leben? Oder Theater? is of an artist fashioning her own life into an artistic creation. Dalbavie said that the "intrinsically musical and even cinematic qualities of 'Leben? Oder Theater?'" combined with an attraction to real-life drama inspired him to compose an opera based on Charlotte Salomon. Since Salomon was aiming for a form of communication that combined various arts, Dalbalvie felt that her story needed music. He was quoted as saying "She recreated her life through a work of art." Just as Dalbavie's opera Gesualdo (based on the life of Carlo Gesualdo) incorporates portions of his subject's compositions, so too does Dalbavie incorporate existing music into his opera, such as the "Habañera" from Bizet's Carmen and "Wir winden dir den Jungfernkranz" from Weber's Der Freischütz.

The opera includes a character representing the author Charlotte Salomon (speaking role), and also her fictive creation, named Charlotte Kann (mezzo-soprano). While the opera (including the role of Charlotte Kann) is sung in French, the character named Charlotte Salomon comments on the action in German. By the end of the opera, the languages are reversed, representing the integration of the artist her subject.

Dalbavie's orchestrations derives from his analysis of the human voice's acoustic frequencies, a technique used in spectral music as well as alluding to a singing teacher's character in the opera. Dalbavie described the scoring of the opera—for 65 orchestral musicians (the size of the Salzburg Mozarteum Orchestra)—as one designed not as much for dramatic impact as for "maximum tonal richness."

== Premiere ==
Charlotte Salomon is in two acts and an epilogue. It was first performed at the Salzburg Festival on July 28, 2014, where it was directed by Luc Bondy. The production involved twenty projections of Salomon's artwork.

== Roles ==
Role	Voice type	Premiere Cast, July 28, 2014 Conductor: Marc-André Dalbavie
Charlotte Salomon	speaking role	Johanna Wokalek
Charlotte Kann	Mezzo-soprano	Marianne Crebassa
Frau Knarre, her grandmother	Mezzo-soprano	Cornelia Kallisch
Franziska Kann, her mother / A woman	Mezzo-soprano	Géraldine Chauvet
Paulinka Bimbam, a singer, her stepmother	Mezzo-soprano	Anaik Morel
Amadeus Daberlohn, a singing teacher	Tenor	Frédéric Antoun
Herr Knarre / Fourth Nazi	Bass-Baritone	Vincent LeTexier
Doktor Kann, a doctor, her father / First emigrant	Baritone	Jean Sébastien Bou
Professor Klingklang / An art student / Second Nazi / Policeman	Baritone	Michal Partyka
Art teacher / The Minister of Propaganda / First Nazi / A man / Second emigrant	Tenor	Éric Huchet
An art student from Tirol	Mezzo-soprano	Annika Schlicht
Third Nazi	Baritone	Wolfgang Resch
