= Luc Bondy =

Swiss theatre and film director (1948–2015)

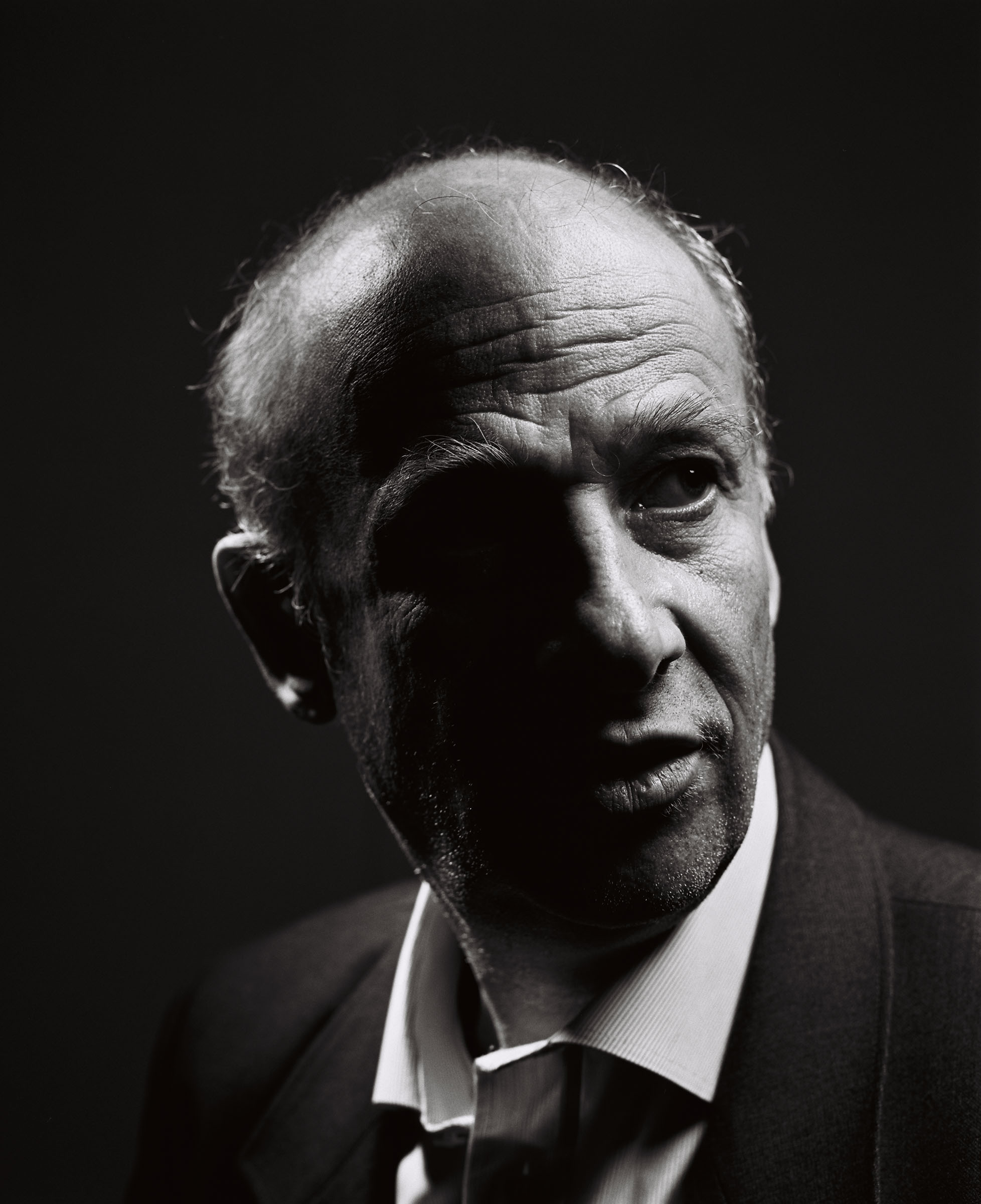
- 2006 portrait by Oliver Mark
- Born: 17 July 1948; Zurich, Switzerland
- Died: 28 November 2015 (aged 67); Zurich
- Occupations: Theatre and film director, screenwriter
- Years active: 1970–2015

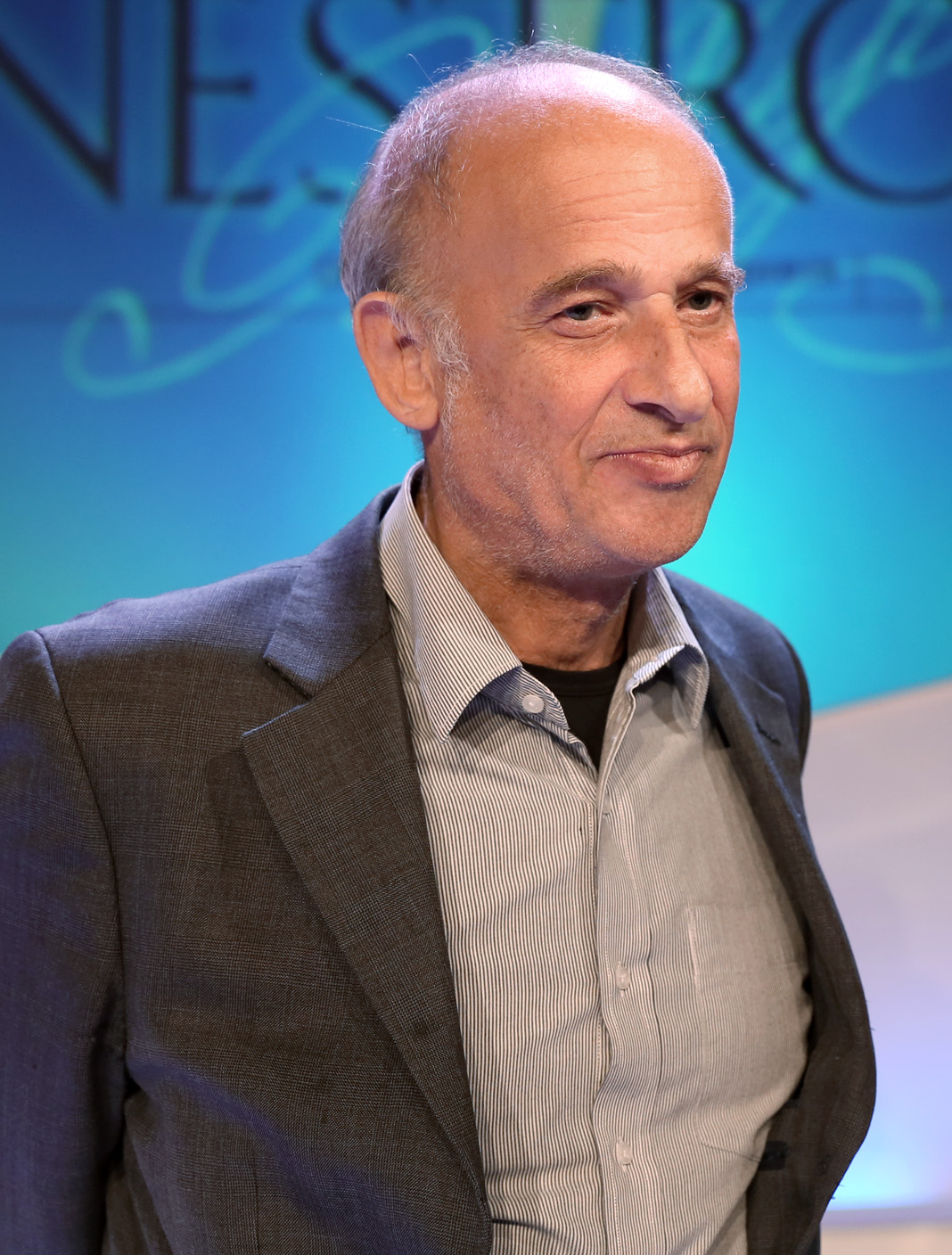
Bondy in 2013

Luc Bondy (17 July 1948 – 28 November 2015) was a Swiss theatre and film director.

== Life and career ==
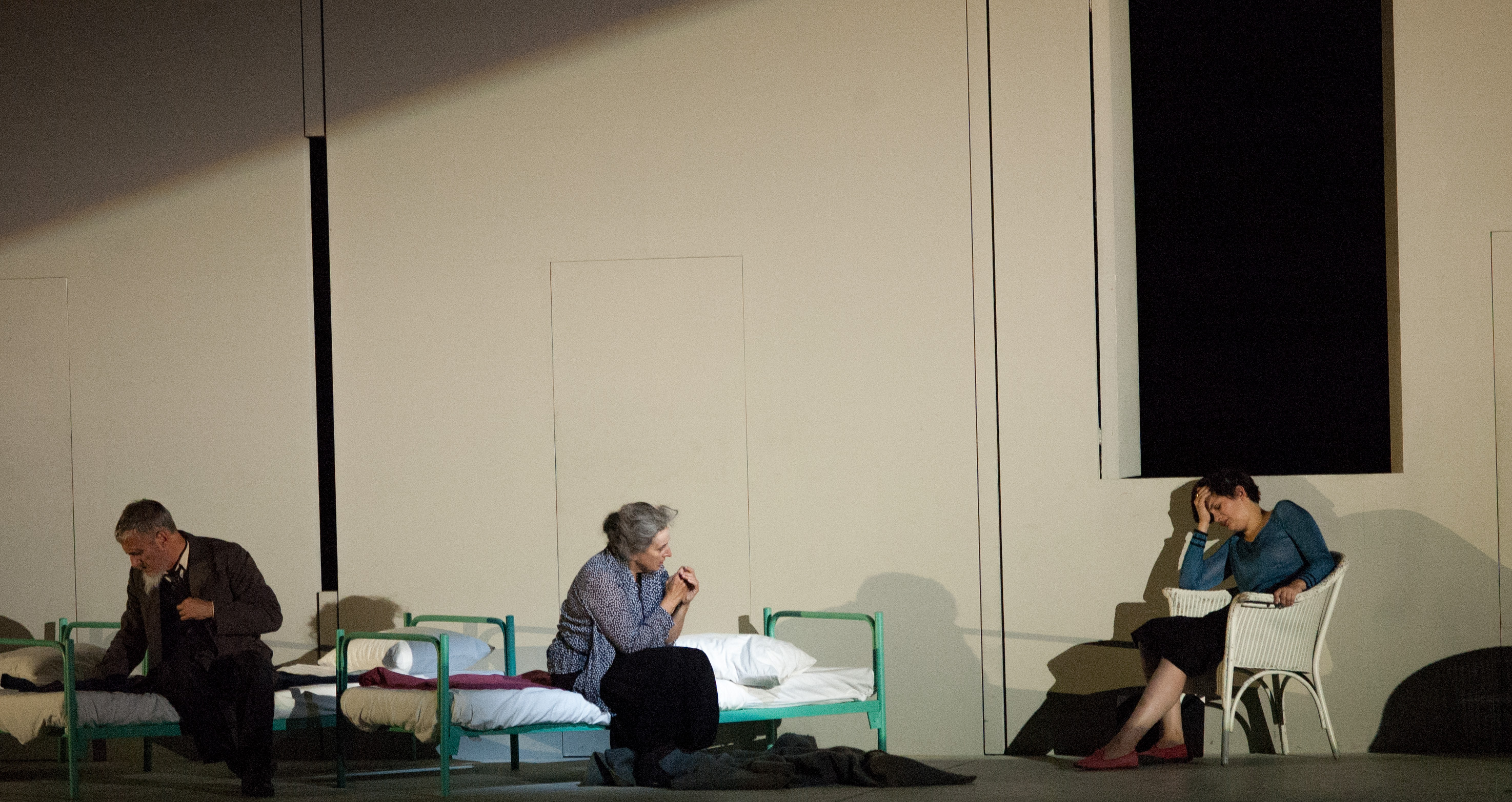
Charlotte Salomon at the Salzburg Festival 2014

Trained in Paris with the theatre teacher Jacques Lecoq, he received a job in 1969 as an assistant at the Hamburg Thalia Theatre. In a surprise, he took over in 1985 after the resignation of Peter Stein at the Schaubühne in Berlin. He also worked as a producer of both plays and operas at the Salzburg Festival, and in 1985 as a director at the Vienna Festival.

He directed a staging of Tosca, by Puccini, at the Metropolitan Opera in New York. Both the opera, as well as the director, were greeted by loud boos on opening night, 21 September 2009. The reception was generally negative. James Levine, the music director at the Metropolitan Opera likened the production to a 'Hitchcock movie' and the cultural critic for the New York Times, Charles McGrath, felt that the new production was a part of Gelb's mission to transform the Met by emphasizing theatricality.

In an interview after the premiere of Marc-André Dalbavie's opera Charlotte Salomon, Bondy was asked whether his being Jewish had anything to do with his having directed the production. "So I said to her this is a production about a Jewish artist...the subject is the story of Charlotte Salomon" said Bondy, who then walked out on the interviewer.

He died on 28 November 2015 in Zurich.

== Direction ==
=== Stage productions ===
- 1971 : Der Narr und die Nonne (The Fool and the Nun) by Stanisław Ignacy Witkiewicz at Göttingen
- 1973 : Die See (The Sea) by Edward Bond at the Munich Residenztheater
- 1974 : Glaube, Liebe, Hoffnung (Faith, Love, Hope) by Ödön von Horvath at Hamburg
- 1977 : Man spielt nicht mit der Liebe by Alfred de Musset at the Schaubühne, Berlin
- 1980 : Happy Days by Samuel Beckett at Cologne
- 1980 : Yvonne, die Burgunderprinzessin (Yvonne, the Princess of Burgundy) by Witold Gombrowicz at Cologne
- 1982 : Macbeth by William Shakespeare at Cologne
- 1983 : Sommer (Summer) by Edward Bond at Munich
- 1984 : Das weite Land (The Far Country) by Arthur Schnitzler at the Théâtre des Amandiers in Nanterre
- 1985 : Triumph der Liebe (The Triumph of Love) by Marivaux
- 1989 : Le conte d'hiver by Shakespeare, at Nanterre-Amandier
- 1989 : Die Zeit und das Zimmer (The Time and the Room) by Botho Strauß, at Berlin (premiere)
- 1990 : The Winter's Tale by Shakespeare, at the Lehniner Palace
- 1992 : Schlußchor by Botho Strauß at Berlin (premiere)
- 1993 : John Gabriel Borkman by Henrik Ibsen at the Théâtre de l'Odéon, Paris
- 1993 : Das Gleichgewicht (The Equilibrium) by Botho Strauß, at the Salzburg Festival (premiere)
- 1994 : Die Stunde da wir nichts voneinander wußten by Peter Handke
- 1999 : Waiting for Godot by Samuel Beckett, at the Vienna Festival
- 2000 : Drei Mal Leben by Yasmina Reza, at the Burgtheater in Vienna (premiere)
- 2002 : Anatol by Arthur Schnitzler, at the Burgtheater in Vienna
- 2004 : Cruel & Tender by Martin Crimp, at Young Vic, London (premiere)
- 2005 : Die eine und die andere by Botho Strauß, at Berlin
- 2005 : Viol by Botho Strauß, after Titus Andronicus, at Odéon, Atelier Berthier, Paris
- 2010 : Sweet Nothings by David Harrower from Arthur Schnitzler's Liebelei at Young Vic, London (premiere)

=== Opera productions ===
- 1986: Così fan tutte by Mozart (conducted by Sylvain Cambreling), at Amandier, La Monnaie, Wiener Festwochen
- 1989: L'incoronazione di Poppea by Monteverdi, revised Philippe Boesmans, at Amandier, La Monnaie
- 1990/1: Don Giovanni by Mozart (conducted by Claudio Abbado, starring Ruggero Raimondi), at Wiener Festwochen
- 1992: Salome by Richard Strauss (conducted by Christoph von Dohnányi, starring Catherine Malfitano and Anja Silja), at the Salzburg Festival, Royal Opera House
- 1993: Reigen by Philippe Boesmans (libretto by Luc Bondy, after "La ronde" by Schnitzler) at La Monnaie
- 1995: Le nozze di Figaro by Mozart (conducted by Nikolaus Harnoncourt), at the Salzburg Festival
- 1996: Don Carlos by Giuseppe Verdi (conducted by Antonio Pappano, starring Roberto Alagna, José van Dam, Karita Mattila), at Châtelet, Royal Opera House, Opéra de Lyon, Edinburgh Festival
- 1999: Wintermärchen by Philippe Boesmans (libretto by Luc Bondy, after The Winter's Tale by Shakespeare), at La Monnaie
- 2000: Macbeth by Giuseppe Verdi (conducted Richard Armstrong), at Wiener Festwochen, Scottish Opera
- 2001: The Turn of the Screw by Benjamin Britten (conducted by Daniel Harding), at Festival d'Aix-en-Provence (reprise 2005)
- 2003: Hercules by Handel (conducted by William Christie with Les Arts Florissants) at Festival d'Aix-en-Provence, Opéra National de Paris, Wiener Festwochen, De Nederlandse Opera
- 2005: Julie by Philippe Boesmans (libretto by Luc Bondy, after Miss Julie by Strindberg), at La Monnaie, Festival d'Aix-en-Provence
- 2005: Idomeneo by Mozart (conducted by Daniel Harding), at Teatro alla Scala, Opéra National de Paris (2006)
- 2009: Tosca by Puccini (conducted by James Levine), at the Metropolitan Opera, New York City (2009); seen later in Munich and Milan
- 2009: libretto for Yvonne, princesse de Bourgogne
- 2014: Charlotte Salomon (conducted by Marc-André Dalbavie), at the Salzburg Festival, 2014

== Honors ==
- 1984 Deutscher Kritikerpreis, Theater
- 1990 Grand Prix Dominique de la mise en scène
- 1992 Inszenierung des Jahres, Theater heute, for Schlusschor
- 1997 Hans-Reinhart-Ring
- 1998 Theaterpreis der Stiftung Preußische Seehandlung
- 2000 Nestroy Theatre Prize 2000, Best Director, for Die Möwe The Seagull
- 2001 Stanislawskij-Preis in Moskau for Die Möwe
- 2008 Zürcher Festspielpreis für La seconde surprise de l'amour
- 2009 Preis der Kythera-Kulturstiftung Düsseldorf
- 2013 Goldenes Ehrenzeichen für Verdienste um das Land Wien
- 2014 Prix de l'Académie de Berlin
