= Pinocchio (opera) =

Opera by Philippe Boesmans

Pinocchio is a 2017 French-language opera by Philippe Boesmans to a libretto by Joël Pommerat, based on the 1883 novel The Adventures of Pinocchio by Carlo Collodi. The opera was commissioned by the Aix-en-Provence Festival in France and premiered there in July 2017. The opera reopened the restored La Monnaie in Brussels in September 2017.

== Recordings ==
- Chloé Briot (Pinocchio), Stéphane Degout (the theater director, the circus ringleader), Yann Beuron (Second crook, the cabaret director, the judge, first murderer, the donkey dealer), Julie Boulianne (The cabaret singer, the bad pupil), Vincent Le Texier (The father, third murderer, the schoolmaster), Marie-Eve Munger (the fairy). Orchestre Symphonique De La Monnaie, Patrick Davin CD + DVD Cypres 2018
