= Au monde =

Opera by Philippe Boesmans

- Opera by Philippe Boesmans
- Librettist: Joël Pommerat
- Language: French
- Based on: Au monde by Pommerat
- Premiere: 30 March 2014; La Monnaie, Brussels

Au monde is a 2014 French-language opera by Philippe Boesmans in twenty scenes to a libretto by French dramatist Joël Pommerat after his own 2004 play of the same name. The opera premiered at the Théâtre royal de la Monnaie Brussels on 30 March 2014. The plot concerns the gathering of the children of an ailing rich businessman, as the family awaits the return of the younger son to whom the father has decided to transfer his businesses.

== Cast ==
- Le père (bass)
- Le fils aîné (bass-baritone)
- Le fils cadet, Ori (baritone)
- La fille aînée (mezzo-soprano)
- La deuxième fille (soprano)
- La plus jeune fille
- Le mari de la fille aînée (tenor)
- La femme étrangère

== Recording ==
- Au monde – Patricia Petibon (La deuxième fille), Charlotte Hellekant (La fille aînée), Yann Beuron (Le mari de la fille aînée), Stéphane Degout (Ori), Werner Van Mechelen (Le fils aîné), Frode Olsen (Le père), Orchestre Symphonique de la Monnaie, Patrick Davin. Cypres.
