= Robin Adams =

Robin Adams may refer to:

- Robin Adams (baritone)
- Robin Adams (politician)
- Robin Adams, musician with String Driven Thing
