= Marianne Crebassa =

French mezzo-soprano (born 1986)

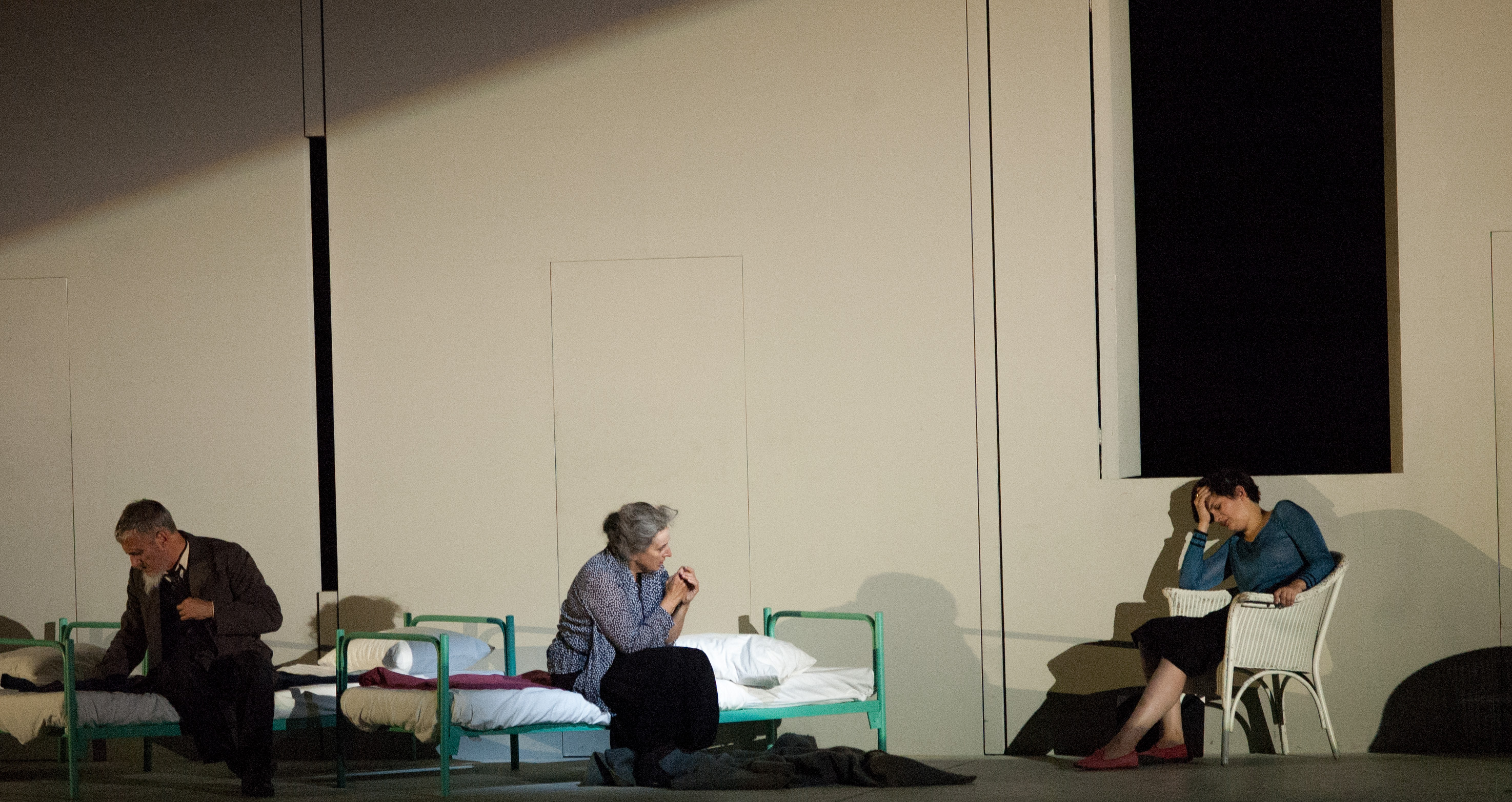
World premiere of Charlotte Salomon at the Salzburg Festival 2014, Marianne Crebassa on the right

Marianne Crebassa (born 14 December 1986) is a French mezzo-soprano.

== Life and career ==
Crebassa was born in Béziers and grew up in Agde, where her parents encouraged her interest in music, starting with piano and continuing when she was 14 with singing. She continued her music education at the music conservatory in Sète. At the conservatory in Montpellier, she studied musicology, voice and piano. Whilst at Montpellier, in 2008, she appeared in the Montpellier Opera production of Manfred, which at the instigation of the director René Koering was followed by concerts around the region. She attained greater recognition with a concert performance as Isabella Linton in a Festival de Radio France presentation, in Montpellier, of Bernard Herrmann's opera Wuthering Heights, in which she also impressed the critics by playing the piano on stage.

In 2010, rather than writing her musicology thesis in Montpellier, Crebassa joined the Young Artist Program (studio) of the Opéra National de Paris, singing leading roles in the studio productions and supporting parts in main Opéra productions of Lulu, Rigoletto and Madama Butterfly. In 2012, she made her Salzburg Festival debut in a concert performance of Handel's Tamerlano, as Irene, which she swiftly repeated in a stage production at La Scala updated to early 20th century Russia. In 2014, she returned to the Salzburg Festival as one of the title role performers in Charlotte Salomon by Marc-André Dalbavie. Having sung Orphée in the Berlioz version at the Opéra studio in 2011, she reprised the part at the Opéra-Comique in 2018. In February 2017 for the Opéra Comique, she appeared in the title role of the company's production of Fantasio by Jacques Offenbach at the Théâtre du Châtelet. The Opera critic commented that "tall and lanky in britches or cropped trousers, she brought her lovely, focused mezzo to her portrayal of the penniless student" while noting that her "diction, however, too often encouraged recourse to the surtitles".

Her considerable Mozart work has included Cecilio in Lucio Silla (in Salzburg and Milan), Sesto in La clemenza di Tito (Salzburg and Paris), Cherubino in Le nozze di Figaro (Berlin, Vienna, New York, Amsterdam) and Dorabella in Così fan tutte (Chicago).

Crebassa made her US debut in May 2015 with the Chicago Symphony Orchestra. Her stage debut in the US was with Lyric Opera of Chicago in February 2016, in Gounod's Roméo et Juliette as Stephano. In August 2017, she made her debut at The Proms singing Shéhérazade by Ravel. She added Mélisande to her repertoire in 2018 in Berlin; originally at the instigation of Daniel Barenboim, she said that she felt she had "sung it my whole life" and found new colours in her voice and relishing the text.

In 2017, Crebassa's first commercial recording, Oh Boy!, was released on the Erato label, and her second solo CD, Secrets: French Songs, also on Erato, consisting of Debussy's Trois chansons de Bilitis and Trois Mélodies de Verlaine, Fauré's Mirages, Op. 113, Ravel's Shéhérazade, four mélodies by Duparc and Fazıl Say's Gezi Park 3, won a Gramophone Award. Filmed DVDs of her include Mozart's Lucio Silla and Le nozze di Figaro, Gluck's Orphée et Eurydice, Berlioz's Les Troyens, and Ravel's Shéhérazade in concert at the Waldbühne in 2019.
