= Le roi Carotte =

Opéra-bouffe-féerie with music by Jacques Offenbach

Jacques Offenbach by Nadar, c. 1860s

Le roi Carotte (French pronunciation: [lə ʁwa kaʁɔt], King Carrot) is a 4-act opéra-bouffe-féerie with music by Jacques Offenbach and libretto by Victorien Sardou, after E. T. A. Hoffmann. The libretto, written before the French defeat in the Franco-Prussian War, lampooned Bonapartists, monarchists and republicans. Staging the piece required elaborate costumes and grand spectacle, including a wide range of locations and numerous scene changes.

== Performance history ==
The opera premiered at the Théâtre de la Gaîté on 15 January 1872. The first run lasted 195 performances, making a daily profit of 3,000 francs, and introducing Anna Judic in a principal operetta role.

The work was seen in London in 1872 and Vienna in 1876. The U.S. premiere of Le roi Carotte took place in New York on 26 August 1872. The New York Times said that "the music is to be given with additions and alterations made for this country by Offenbach himself". Its run lasted until late autumn.

After small-scale performances by Opéra Éclaté in 2007, the Opéra de Lyon staged the work in December 2015 in a production by Laurent Pelly, who had already directed several successful Offenbach revivals. The production, which included Christophe Mortagne in the title role, Julie Boulianne as Robin-Leuron, Yann Beuron as Fridolin and Antoinette Dennenfeld, conducted by Victor Aviat was broadcast on radio and television and was widely praised. "Le Roi Carotte" in this production won "Best Rediscovered Work" in the International Opera Awards 2016. This production has subsequently been given in other opera houses in France.

The piece was given a production in German translation by the Staatsoper Hannover in 2019. The same production was then performed at the Volksoper Vienna in 2019 and 2020.

== Roles ==
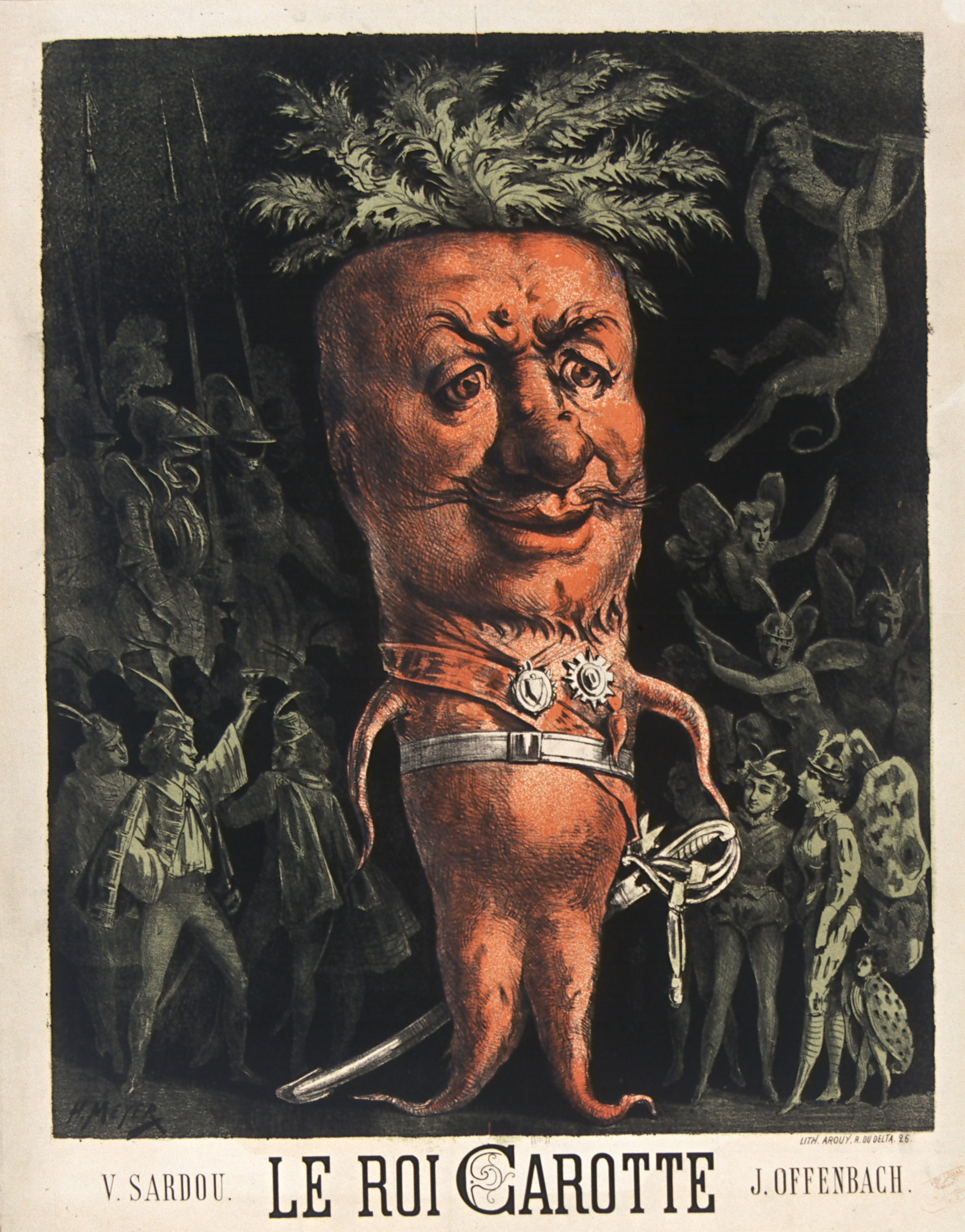
A contemporary poster depicting Le roi Carotte; by Henri Meyer

Role	Voice type	Premiere Cast, 15 January 1872 (Conductor: Jacques Offenbach)
Prince Fridolin XXIV	tenor	Charles Masset
Princess Cunégonde	soprano	Anna Judic
Robin-Luron	mezzo-soprano	Zulma Bouffar
Rosée du soir	soprano	Jacqueline Seveste
Roi Carotte	tenor	Vicini
The sorceress Coloquinte	mezzo-soprano	Mariani
Pipertrunck, chief of police	bass	Soto
Quiribibi, an enchanter		Aurèle
Truck, grand necromancer	bass	Alexandre
Baron Koffre, grand paymaster		Pierre Grivot
Comte Schopp, a councillor		Colleuille
Comtesse Schopp, his wife		Stéphane
Fieldmarshal Trac, a minister	tenor	Delorme
Young men and women, Townsfolk, Students, Knights, Armed-men, Cortege of the Roi Carotte, Carrots, Beetroots, Turnips, Radishes, Horseradishes; various merchants of Pompeii, Priests of Cybèle, Flautists, Ethiopian clowns, Guitarists and Harp-players, Syrian and Greek dancers, Slaves, Freemen, Children, Peasants, Soldiers, Townspeople, Porters of the litter; Ants, Scarabs, Grass-hoppers, Fleas, Maybugs, Cicadas, Butterflies, Dragonflies, Bees, Wasps; Musicians, Courtiers, Ladies, Waiters

== Synopsis ==
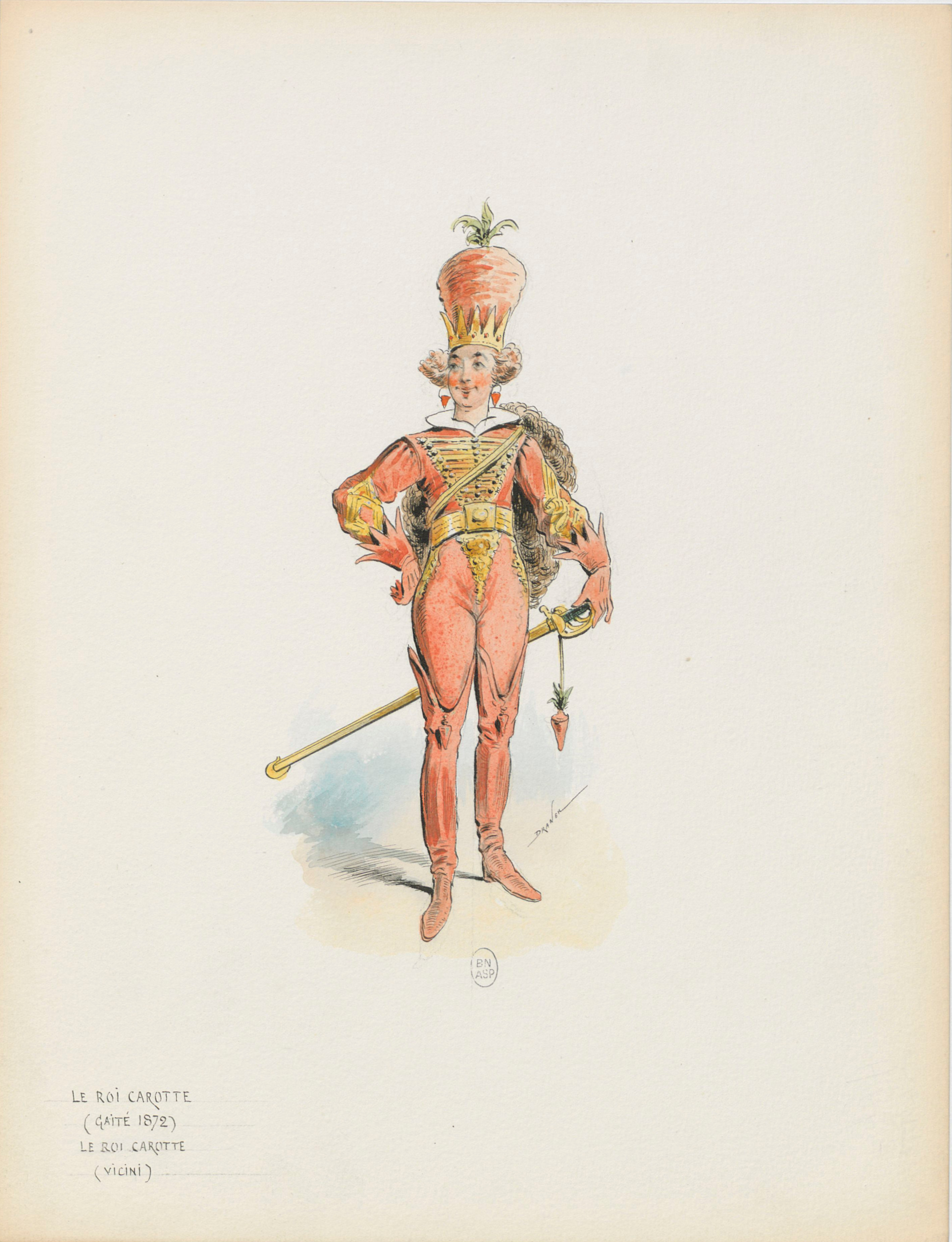
Draner - Costume for le Roi Carotte - 1872

The libretto is in three acts.

Act I. Scene 1.

It is sundown. At a brasserie, King Fridolin XXIV, disguised as a student, explains to his chief ministers that the frivolous behaviour of his youth has all but bankrupted the kingdom. He therefore plans to wed Cunégonde, the princess of another kingdom. Uncertain whether she is at all attractive, he hopes to observe her arrival surreptitiously. Robin-Luron, a student, sings about the dissolute pleasures of student life. Fridolin asks Robin-Luron what he thinks of the king and his government. Robin-Luron responds with mockery. He knows of Fridolin's need to marry for money and, when he at last recognizes Fridolin, offers to purchase all the armor in the king's palace. As Fridolin considers his offer, Cunégonde arrives, traveling incognito in hopes of glimpsing Fridolin surreptitiously before agreeing to marry him. Fridolin and Cunégonde flirt and she asks his opinion of the king, whom Fridolin praises. She sings an aria describing her life since leaving the convent and learning the ways of Parisian society. He decides he will marry her and she leaves for the palace anticipating life in a kingdom that governs its people by festivities and spectacles. Fridolin and his ministers discuss whether his collection of armor is under a spell or if his old palace is haunted. Night has fallen as they march off to inspect it.

Act I. Scene 2.

In the garret of the witch Coloquinte. Rosée du soir, daughter of the paladin of Moravia, is waking. She has been dreaming of Fridolin, whom she has loved while being held captive here six years. Robin-Luron arrives, claiming students have secret knowledge of hidden places, and magically completes her embroidery work. They plan her escape. Coloquinte enters and she and Robin-Luron argue about their magic powers and rival allegiances. He leaves and Coloquinte scolds Rosée du soir for letting him visit. Rosée du soir, alone, dreams of her escape.

Act I. Scene 3.

The gardens of the royal palace. Cunégonde is welcomed with a fanfare. Fridolin enters late and presents himself to Cunégonde as the king. They continue their flirtation and everyone prepares to dance until the scene is interrupted by the entrance of a stranger with a large escort accompanied by bizarre music. King Carotte and his court of dancing vegetables enter. Robin-Luron recognizes Carotte as a rival sorcerer, while Fridolin is amused. Coloquinte, unseen by the royal court, waves her magic wand and controls the crowd's movements. First the women generally and then Cunégonde are entranced by Carotte. Carotte sings an aria explaining his nature, the sovereign of a subterranean realm, who enjoys himself by making fools of mankind. Cunégonde is in awe of Carotte, who sneezes once and sets Fridolin sneezing. He drinks and Fridolin appears drunk. Fridolin tries to dance to prove he is sober but makes a fool of himself. The crowd is stunned by a strange sound. The royal collection of antique armor is marching, cursing Fridolin. The crowd calls for Fridolin's death but Robin-Luron protects Fridolin. The crowd praises Carotte, who replaces Fridolin as king, as Cunégonde falls into his arms.

Act II

Fridolin, accompanied by his faithful followers Truck, Pipertrunck, Rosée du soir and Robin-Luron, reaches the old magician Kiribibi to ask for his assistance in breaking Coloquinte's spell. The magician asks them to kill him to release a curse. They do so and he reappears as a young man. Then he sends them off to ancient Pompeii to find an enchanted ring that will allow them to defeat Carotte.

They leave for Pompeii and arrive just before the eruption of Vesuvius. After singing a quartet about the eventual collapse of all civilisations, they go off again, thanks to a magic lamp, and arrive at Pompeii. By use of a depiction of railway trains, they trick Pompeii's gladiators and senators and depart with the magic ring.

Act III

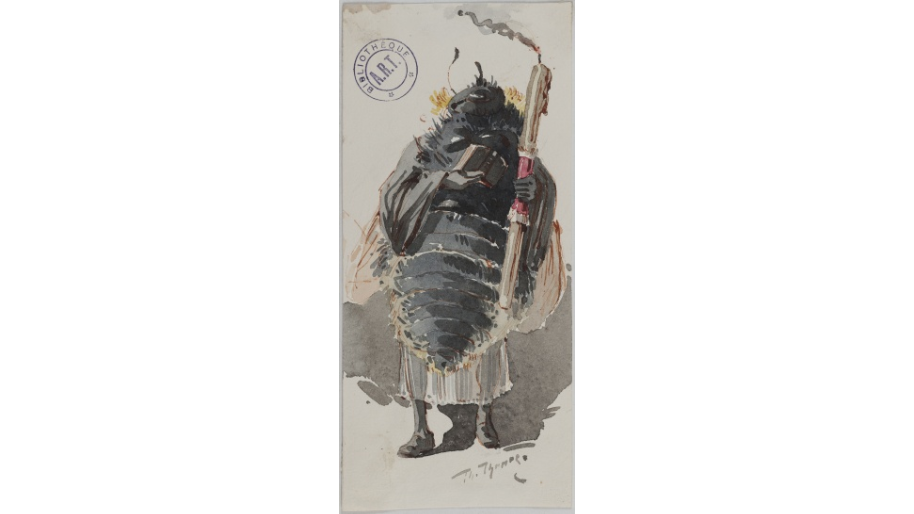
Costume design for the Ballet of insects,Le Roi Carotte

King Carotte is met by some peddlers (Robin-Luron, Pipertrunck and Rosée du soir in disguise) looking for Fridolin, who has disappeared, but they cannot find him in the palace.

Cunégonde meets Fridolin and steals the magic ring to prevent him from destroying Carotte. The witch sends Fridolin to the land of insects where, after a swift triumph, he finds himself alone again.

Fridolin and his band find themselves in the middle of an uprising against King Carotte because of rising prices and injustice. The crowd recognises Fridolin and restores him to the throne. Carotte is carried off by the witch. Fridolin marries Rosée du soir as the populace rejoice.
