= Jacqueline Seveste =

French opera singer (1844–1927)

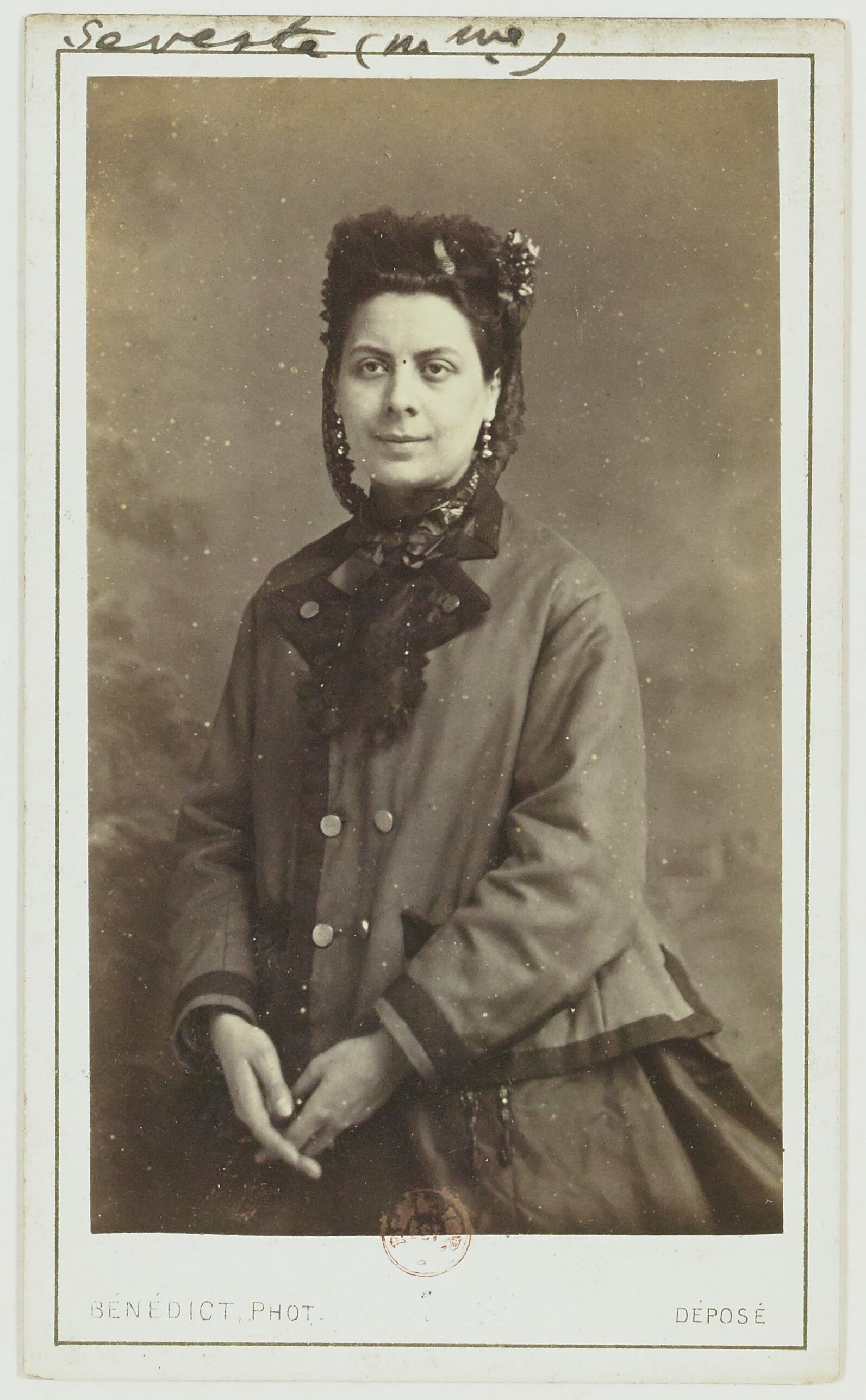
Jacqueline Seveste in 1870, photo: Bénédict

Jacqueline Angélique Julie Laure Seveste called Madame Normand (7 August 1844 – 13 December 1927) was a 19th-century French opera singer.

== Biography ==
Born in Montmartre, the daughter of Jules Seveste and sister of Jules-Didier Seveste. Seveste was raised at the Maison d'éducation de la Légion d'honneur where she graduated as a teacher (1862).

She entered the Conservatoire de Paris in 1865 and made her debut at the Opéra-Comique in September 1866 as mezzo-soprano. In 1871, she performed in Cairo then sang at the Théâtre de la Gaîté in Le Roi Carotte (1872) before being engaged in January 1875 at the Royal Theater of The Hague where she obtained great success in the main roles of operas and opéras comiques.

She also toured around the provinces and performed at the casino of Vichy and in Moulins to help the flooded. In 1875-1876, she entered the Theatre of Montpellier.

On 25 June 1888, she married Édouard Normand. After the death of her husband in 1896, she founded and financed at her home on 12 quai Ernest-Renaud in Nantes, a kindergarten for about fifty children per day.

Chevalier of the Légion d'honneur (14 February 1910), she died in Nantes on 13 December 1927.

== Bibliography ==
- Volker Dehs: Le Théâtre lyrique sous les frères Seveste, Bulletin de la Société Jules-Verne n° 192, August 2016, p. 35-36
