= Wintermärchen =

Opera by Philippe Boesmans

- Opera by Philippe Boesmans
- Librettist: Luc Bondy; Marie-Louise Bischofberger
- Language: German / English
- Based on: Shakespeare's The Winter's Tale
- Premiere: 10 December 1999; La Monnaie, Brussels

Wintermärchen is an opera by Philippe Boesmans to a libretto by Luc Bondy and Marie-Louise Bischofberger after Shakespeare's The Winter's Tale. It was premiered on 10 December 1999 at La Monnaie in Brussels. The German premiere followed in 2001 at the Staatstheater Braunschweig.

== History ==
Philippe Boesmans has been composer-in-residence at Théâtre Royal de la Monnaie in Brussels, where he successfully showed Reigen in 1993, a literary opera after the play Reigen by Arthur Schnitzler, on a libretto by Luc Bondy. Now assisted by the writer Marie-Louise Bischofberger, Boesmans and Bondy created Wintermärchen after Shakespeare's play The Winter's Tale.

The opera is dedicated to Bernard, Annick Foccroulle, and Harry Halbreich. The premiere on 10 December 1999 at La Monnaie was staged by Bondy on a set by Erich Wonder, conducted by Antonio Pappano and choreographed by Lucinda Childs. It was a great success, selling out eleven times. The production was shown in November 2000 at the Festival d’Automne in Paris.

The opera was performed in 2001 in Braunschweig, in 2002 at the Neue Oper Wien and in Nürnberg, and in 2004 at the Liceu in Barcelona. A recording of the Brussels performance was recorded, and presented on 29 November 2000 on TV (Arte) and in 2015/2016 on internet TV (ARTE Concert).

== Roles ==
Roles, voice types, premiere cast
Role	Voice type	Premiere cast, 10 December 1999 Conductor: Antonio Pappano
Leontes, King of Sicily	baritone	Dale Duesing
Hermione, his wife	soprano	Susan Chilcott
Mamillius, their son	child's voice	
Polixenes, King of Bohemia	tenor	Anthony Rolfe Johnson
Camillo, confident of Leontes	bass	Franz-Josef Selig
Paulina	mezzo-soprano	Cornelia Kallisch
Antigonus, her husband	baritone	Juha Kotilainen
Green	tenor	Heinz Zednik
Perdita	(dancer)	Johanne Saunier
Florizel, son of Polixenes	jazz-rock singer	Kris Dane
Oracle	bass	Franz-Josef Selig
Bohemian soldier		Arthur Debski
Ladies and gentlemen in waiting, Bohemians	choir	

== Music ==
The libretto stays close to Shakespeare's play, and is "skilfully abbreviated and adapted", according to one reviewer, but because "neither [Boesmans nor Bondy] could bear to cut Shakespeare's original", they wrote the Sicilian scenes mostly in German, a language in which both librettist and composer were fluent. The scenes on the seacoast of Bohemia, in the third act, are mostly in English, accompanied by jazz-rock music. In the premiere and the first recording this was performed by the Belgian group Aka Moon. They invented the role of Green, who personifies Time and is a Shakespearean jester holding the scenes together.

The music at times alludes to Mozart, Richard Strauss, and Alban Berg. Claudio Monteverdi is quoted literally. Boesmans writes lyrical and singable parts, and finely detailed orchestration. He uses music described as expressionist to characterize Leontes who is insane with jealousy, causing pain and guilt. The music for Hermione, his wife, is full of passion and warmth. A reviewer summarizes that "the sometimes eclectic melodic and harmonic characteristics of his music [are] accessible yet challenging".

== Recordings ==
- Wintermärchen, Dale Duesing (Leontes), Susan Chilcott (Hermione), Cornelia Kallisch (Paulina), Anthony Rolfe Johnson (Polixenes), Franz-Joseph Selig (Camillo), Heinz Zednik (Le Temps), Juha Kotilainen (Antigonus), Johanne Saunier (Perdita), with the jazz band Aka Moon, conducted by Antonio Pappano on Deutsche Grammophon.
