= David Chaillou =

French music composer

David Chaillou is a French composer, born in 1971.

== Biography ==
Chaillou is a senior lecturer at the University of Lille

His music has been released by Preiser Records, Gérard Billaudot and Universal Editions.

Chaillou's works have been broadcast among others by France Musique, RTS (Switzerland), RAI3, and RBBKultur.

His music combines for some a form of modern impressionism and post-minimalism.

== Works ==
=== Concert pieces ===
==== Solo instruments ====
- Les mains nues for piano. World premiere by Moisès Fernàndez Via. La Puda. Festival Les Serenates d'Estiu
- Empreintes for piano. World premiere by François-Frédéric Guy at the Beethovenfest, Beethoven Hall, Bonn (Allemagne)
- Une voix for piano. World premiere by Nina Barkalaya at the Conservatoire Tchaikovsky, Moscow
- Diableries for piano. Public world premiere by Jeffrey Grice at the Sorbone amphithéâtre Richelieu, Paris. Published by Gérard Billaudot ISBN: M-043-07351-2.
- Légende for piano
- Mirages for piano
- Blocs for piano
- Temps inverses for piano
- Pluie blanche for piano
- Temps inverses for piano
- Plein air for piano
- Final for piano
- Au piano de Sibelius for piano
- Seul for cello. World premiere by Emmanuel Bellanger at the Conservatoire National Supérieur de Musique et de Danse de Paris. Published by Gérard Billaudot
- Solo for cello, World premiere in 2020
- Solliloquy for flute solo
- Solo Solo for violin, premiered by Valeria Zorina (dédicataire) at the Madrid National Auditorium in 2019.

==== Chamber music ====
- Gulf stream for string quartet. Commission by orchestre de Bretagne for the 100 years anniversary of the writer Louis Guilloux. Gérard Billaudot Publishing
- Sur un visage for wind sextet
- Rappoport for string trio with voice. Commission by Ariam Ile de France, selected for the 30 years anniversary of Ariam. Premiered at the Cité internationale des Arts of Paris.
- Duo violon violoncelle premiered by Christophe Pantillon and Clara Fleider, Austrian radio (ORF). Mozarteum

==== Orchestral ====
- Symphonie du bout des terres, commission by Orchestre de Bretagne. Conducted by Stefan Sanderling. Gérard Billaudot Publishing.
- Rhapsodie pour orchestre
- Paris miniature (Paris IXème arrondissement), mouvement concertant for violin and orchestra. Commission by Mairie de Paris. Premiered at Auditorium Saint-Germain, Paris (Orchestre du Conservatoire supérieur de Paris, conducted by Xavier Delette

==== Vocal ====
- Nunc Dimittis for a cappella choir. Premiered by the Choeur sacré de Paris (conducted by Till Ally)
- Magnificat for mixed choir and organ. Commission for the 500 years anniversary of La Trinité-des-Mont, Roma. Premiered at La Trinité-des-Monts
- Une mélodie upon a text by Pauline Bernon-Bruley for countertenor and piano
- Prose du suaire upon a text by Michel Deguy for three women voices. Premiered by the Trio Chrysilis (Isabelle de Biron, Sylvie Deguy, Christine Raphaël) at the Maison de l’Amérique latine, Paris
- Mémoire de Loire upon a text by Michel Chaillou for mezzo, an actor, mixed choir and instrumental ensemble. Premiered at Salle Vasse with Jean-Louis Vicart and Isabelle Sokoja.
- Le chêne et le roseau according to Jean de la Fontaine for cembalo and children's choir
- Tableaux, melody from a poetry by Picasso premiered at the Musée d’Orsay, Paris (Chloé Briot, Julien Beaudiment). Broadcast by France Musique

=== Stage music ===
- Little Nemo opera all audience in 3 acts (libretto Arnaude Delalande, Olivier Balazuc)
- Conrad original music for a series of shows for France-Culture (Radio France). Produced by Philippe Taroni
- Léger au front for three instruments and magnetic tape with Jacques Gamblin and Patrice Alexandre. Commission of the Marne county and the conseil général of Champagne-Ardenne, France.
- Philomène et les ogres tale for children upon a text by Arnaud Delalande, premiered by Jean-Pierre Marielle and Agathe Nathanson

=== Music for motion pictures ===
- A la lisière directed by Fabianny Deschamps
- La mort de Jean-Philippe Gatien directed by Christophe Régin on a screenplay of Denis Podalydes
- Caserne 52 minutes directed by François Barat. Broadcast on France 3
- Léger au front 52 minutes directed by Philippe Lanfranci. Broadcast on La chaine Histoire
- David et la mort de Marat directed by Martin Fraudeau, produced by Caméra Lucida / Arte production)

=== Music for young audiences and educational pieces ===
- Philomène with Jean-Pierre Marielle et Agathe Nathanson. Theatre version (2015)
- L’orchestre d’Odilon Le Grillon (quintett and narrator) CD-book Gallimard Jeunesse. Selected by the Crédit Mutuel
- Trois petites miniatures for piano, commission by Argenteuil, premiered at Argenteuil, France
- Philomène et les Ogres piece for flute, percussions, piano and children's choir narrated by Jean-Pierre Marielle. CD-book Gallimard Jeunesse

=== Music films ===
- Nocturne, directed by Grégoire Pont and produced by Stéphan Aubé for the Louisiana Museum of Modern Art, Denmark (2018)
- Solo, interpreted by Annabelle Berthomé-Reynolds (violin), directed by Philippe Mottet (2020).

=== Recent works ===
- Little Nemo(libretto by Arnaud Delalande and Olivier Balazuc), an opera first performed at Angers-Nantes Opéra and the Opéra de Dijon in 2017 with the mezzo-soprano Chloé Briot and the Ensemble Ars Nova.The opera was awarded the Prix de l’Association Beaumarchais (SACD).
- Léger au front, music theatre performed at the Théâtre de l'Athénée in Paris in 2018 with the sculptor Patrice Alexandre, staging by Jacques Gamblin. Léger au front has been performed in German by Karl Markovics in Vienna (Theater Odeon), Bonn (LVR museum), The Carinthian Summer Music Festival (2015). Léger au front is Laureate of the French National Centenary Committee.
- Tableaux, a song to a poem by Picasso first performed at the Musée d’Orsay in Paris.
- Solo for violon, first performed by Valeria Zorina at the Auditorio Nacional de Música in Madrid in 2019.

== Discography ==
- Légendes by Laura Mikkola, piano. Monographic CD published by Fuga Libera/Outhere (2020).
- Les mains nues by Moisès Fernandez Via, Lili Boulanger, David Chaillou and Federico Mompou. Published by Urtext Digital classics (2015)
- Paroles de violoncelle by Christophe Pantillon, David Chaillou. ‘’Seul’’, monologue for violoncelle. Published by Gramola (2013)
- Paris-Vienne-Moscou par Aron Quartett, David Chaillou, Maurice Ravel, Dmitri Shostakovich. Published by Preiser Records (2010)
- Philomène et les ogres, fantastic tale read by Jean-Pierre Marielle and Agathe Nathanson, set to music by David Chaillou. Published by Gallimard Jeunesse
- L'orchestre d'Odilon le Grillon.text Antoon Krings Published by Gallimard Jeunesse

== Publications ==
- Napoléon et l'Opéra (Fayard publishing)

== Awards and distinctions ==
- 2004 – Grand prix of the Fondation Napoléon for his book Napoléon et l'Opéra (Fayard publishing)
- 2014 – Laureate of the French National Centenary Committee for Léger au front .
- 2015 - Awarded of the Prix de l’Association Beaumarchais (SACD) for Little Nemo, children 'opera.
