= Victor Aviat =

French oboist and conductor (1982–2025)

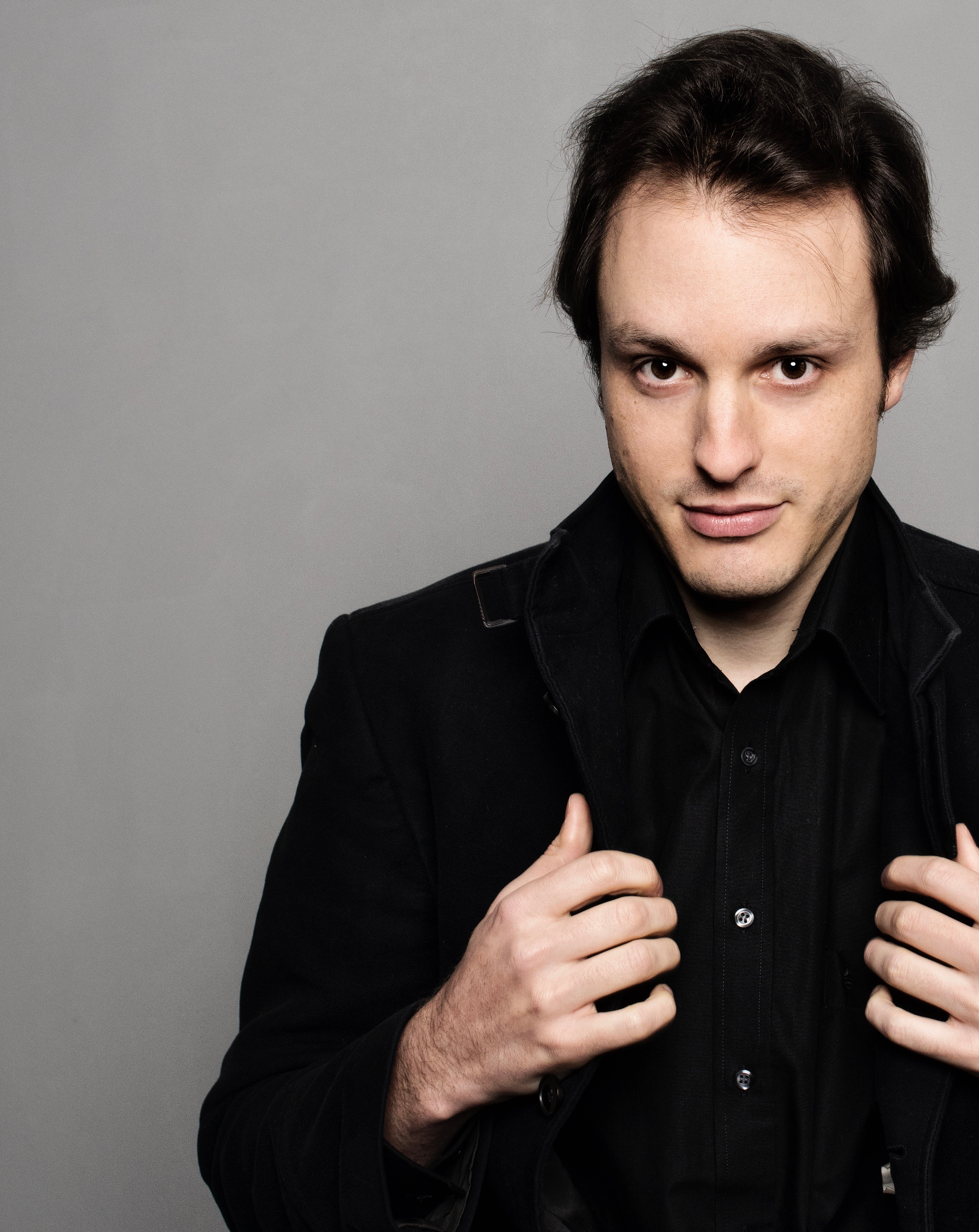
- Born: 1982; Montpellier, France
- Died: 1 May 2025 (aged 42); Berlin, Germany
- Occupations: Oboist; conductor
- Years active: 2002–2025
- Website: victoraviat.com

Victor Aviat (1982 – 1 May 2025) was a French oboist and conductor of classical music and opera.

== Life and career ==
Born in Montpellier, Aviat studied oboe, piano and conducting in Paris, Zurich (Zurich University of the Arts) and Geneva. He was an orchestra musician and worked regularly as principal oboe with the Zurich Opera House, the Lucerne Festival Orchestra, the Chamber Orchestra of Europe, the Budapest Festival Orchestra, the Orchestra Mozart among others. After further study, Aviat began a career as a conductor parallel to his activities and has led performances with the Orchestre national de Lille, the Luxembourg Philharmonic Orchestra, the Royal Philharmonic Orchestra and others.

In the season 2015/16, Aviat conducted a new production of Offenbach's operetta Le roi Carotte at the Opéra de Lyon which was broadcast on radio and television and was widely praised. This production of Le roi Carotte under the musical direction of Aviat won "Best Rediscovered Work" in the International Opera Awards 2016. From 2016 to 2018 Aviat was the Bournemouth Symphony Orchestra Leverhulme Young Conductor in Association of the Bournemouth Symphony Orchestra. Later, Aviat showed interests in composition. His first orchestral piece, Sur le Danube, was performed by the Orchestre National de France conducted by Emmanuel Krivine at a New Year's concert in the Maison de la Radio et de la Musique in December 2019.

On 1 May 2025, Aviat died from a brain tumour, at the age of 42.
