= Bern Theatre =

Theatre in Bern, Switzerland

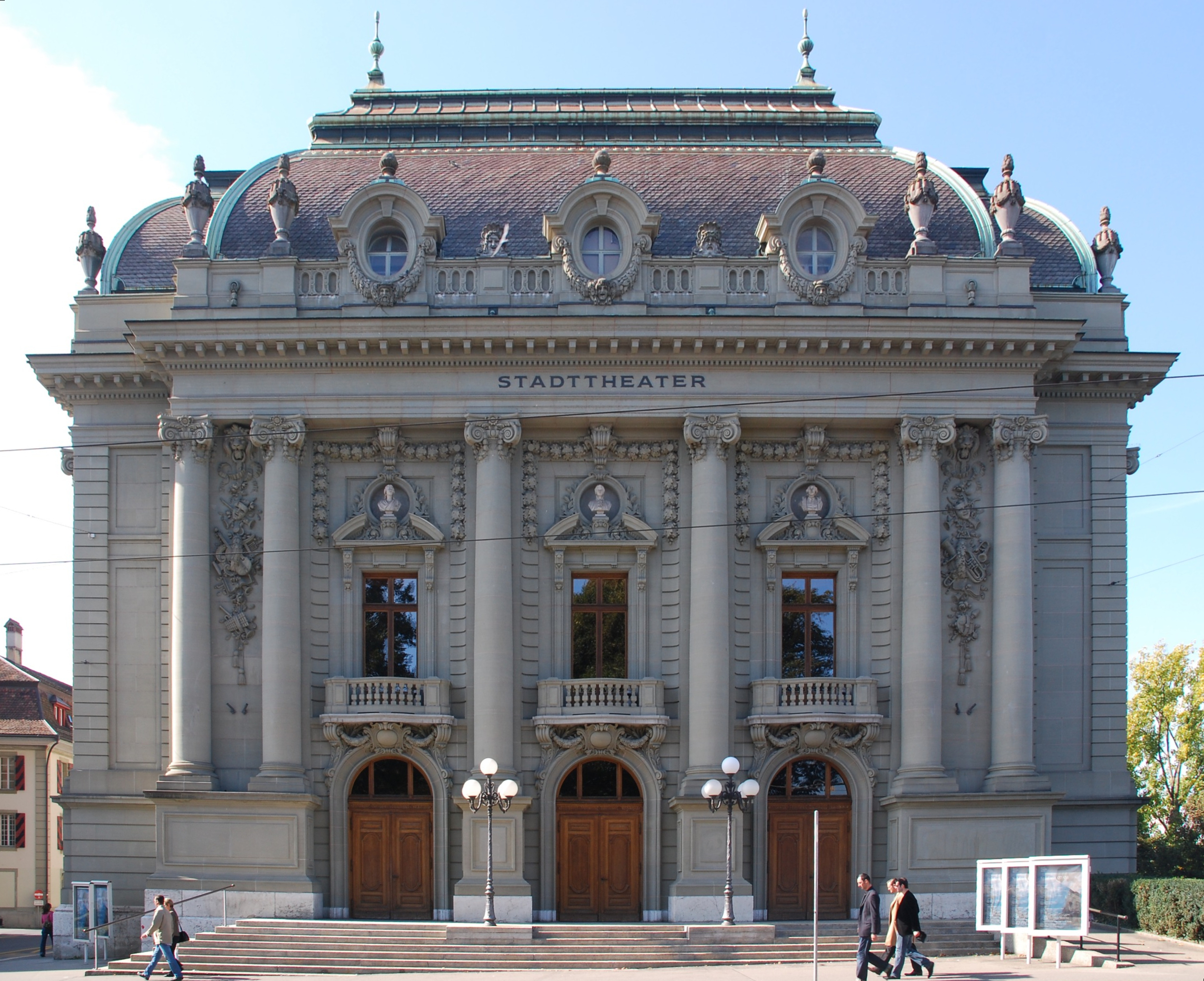
- Interactive map of Bern Theatre

General information
- Type: opera house; theatre
- Location: Bern, Switzerland
- Coordinates: 46°56′58″N 7°26′51″E

Website
- https://buehnenbern.ch/

Bern Theatre, known in the city as Stadttheater Bern, is an opera house and theatre in Bern, Switzerland. The theatre works in four areas: Bern Symphony Orchestra, Musiktheater (opera), Schauspiel (theatre) and Tanz (dance).

== History ==
The theatre opened in 1903 and was modernised between 2015–2016, including significant structural changes.

The theatre was renamed Konzert Theatre Bern from the 2011/2012 season through the 2020/2021 season.

In 2021, the theatre became known as Bühnen Bern. That year, Nicholas Carter became its chief conductor.

Famous performers include Robin Adams, Agnes Baltsa, Inge Borkh, Renato Bruson, Grace Bumbry, José Carreras, Plácido Domingo, Salvatore Fisichella, Käthe Gold, Norma Sharp, Alexander Moissi, Jessye Norman, Liselotte Pulver, Will Quadflieg, Nello Santi, Christine Schäfer, Maria Schell, and Rolf Schimpf.

== Season ==
Every season, the Bern Theatre offers more than 400 performances and concerts. Each season lasts from the end of August to the following July. The shows span classics, musicals, new choreographies of Bern’s ballet, world premieres, and debut performances. Well-known performances include Richard Wagner's Ring cycle and The Black Spider.

The theatre hosts rehearsal visits, introductions to plays, and various programs for children and young adults, such as drama clubs, dance projects, and premiere classes.

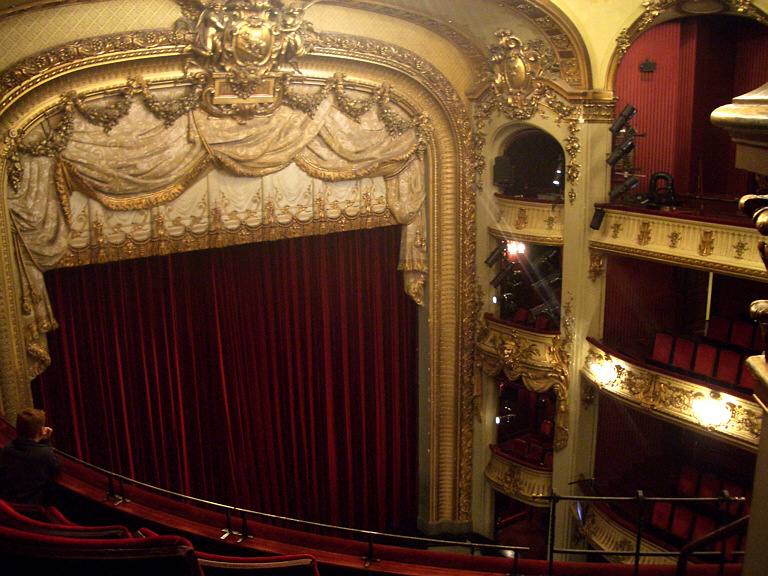
Interior of the Bern Theatre

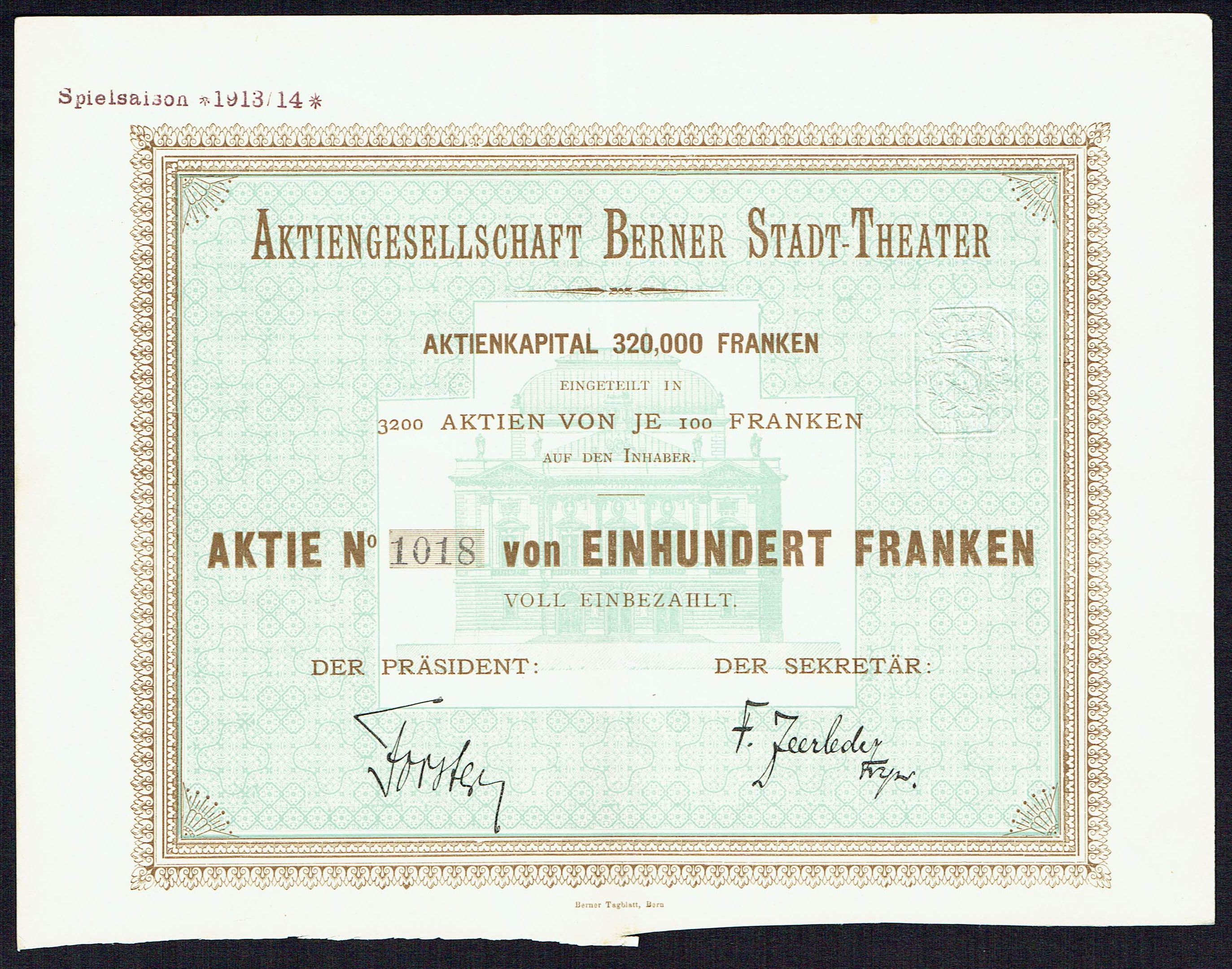
Share of the Aktiengesellschaft Berner Stadt-Theater from 1896

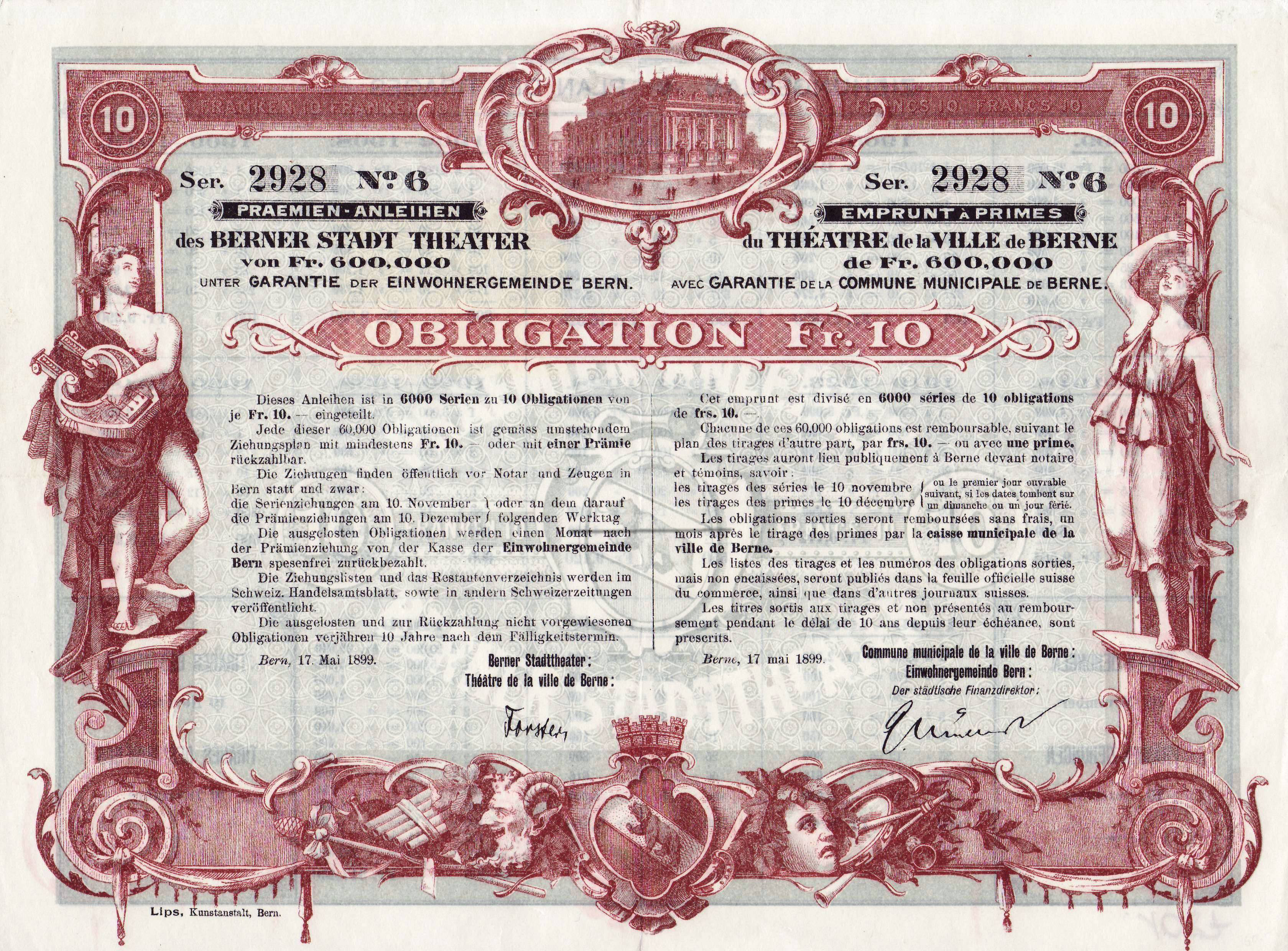
Bond for the construction of the Bern Theatre, issued 17. May 1899
