= Roberto Saccà =

Italian singer and opera singer (born 1961)

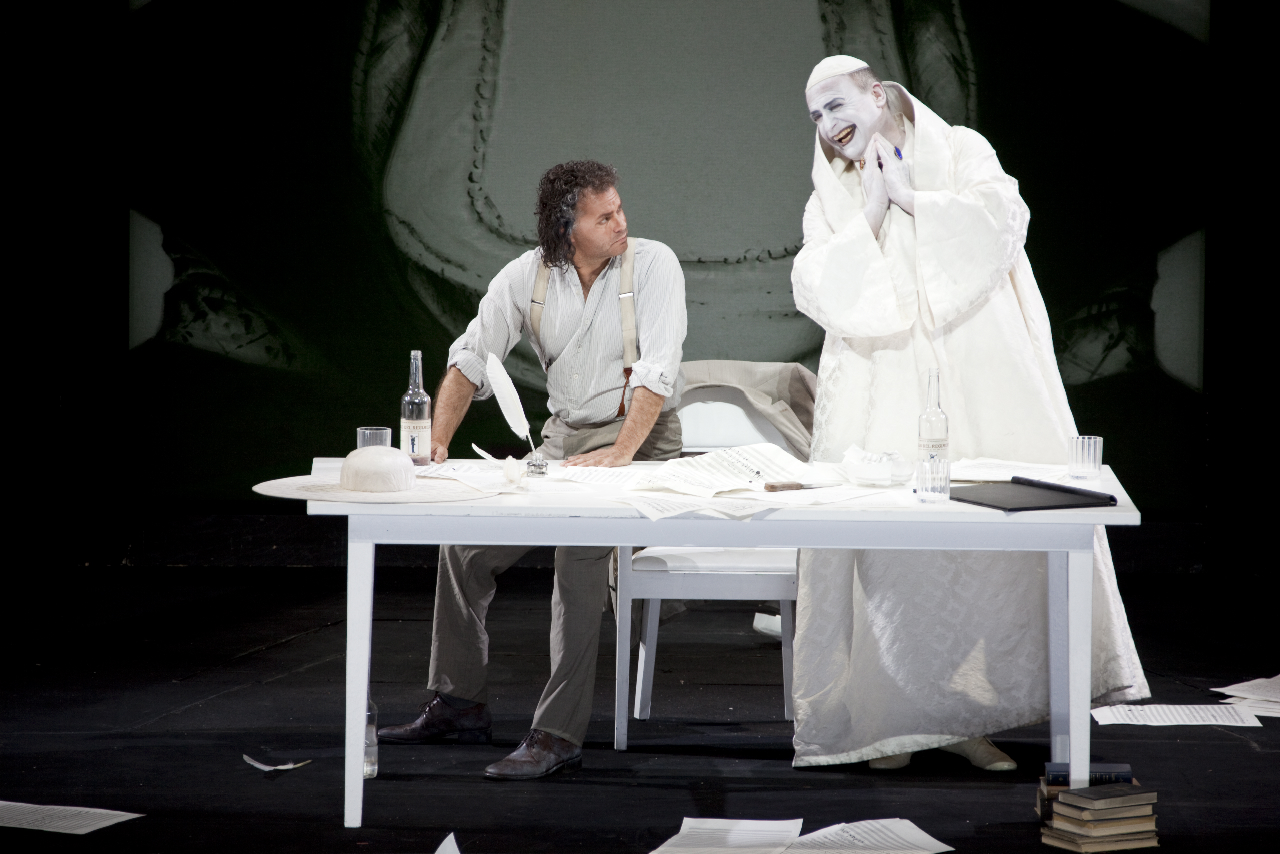
- Roberto Saccà (left) as Palestrina at the Hamburg State Opera in 2011
- Born: 12 September 1961 (age 64); Sendenhorst, West Germany
- Education: Stuttgarter Hymnus-Chorknaben; Musikhochschule Stuttgart; Hochschule für Musik Karlsruhe
- Occupation: Operatic tenor
- Organizations: Mainfranken Theater Würzburg; Hessisches Staatstheater Wiesbaden; Zürich Opera House

Roberto Saccà (born 12 September 1961) is a German operatic tenor. He was a member of the Hessisches Staatstheater Wiesbaden and the Zürich Opera House, and has appeared in major European opera houses and festivals, first with a focus on roles such as Mozart's Ferrando and Rossini's Lindoro. He performed in world premieres such as Boesman's Reigen and Herbert Willi's Schlafes Bruder.

== Life ==
Saccà was born in Sendenhorst to an Italian father and a German mother. He grew up in Stuttgart where he sang as a member of the Stuttgarter Hymnus-Chorknaben. He studied singing at the Musikhochschule Stuttgart with Bruce Abel, and further at the Hochschule für Musik Karlsruhe with Aldo Baldin. He was a member of the Mainfranken Theater Würzburg from 1987, and of the Hessisches Staatstheater Wiesbaden from 1988. He appeared there in 1990 as Noboku in Henze's Das verratene Meer, repeating the role in the first production of the opera in Italy at the Teatro Lirico in Milan a year later. He appeared as a guest at European opera houses and festivals, singing Tamino in Mozart's Die Zauberflöte at both the Berlin State Opera and the Vienna Volksoper, and David in Wagner's Die Meistersinger von Nürnberg at La Monnaie in Brussels, where he also performed in the world premiere of Boesman's Reigen in 1993.

Saccà joined the company at the Zürich Opera House from 1993 to 2002. Roles there included Ferrando in Mozart's Così fan tutte, Lindoro in Rossini's L'italiana in Algeri, and on 28 April 1996 the lead role of Elias in the world premiere of Herbert Willi's opera based on the novel Schlafes Bruder. He appeared as Orfeo in Haydn's L'anima del filosofo, conducted by Nikolaus Harnoncourt, at the Vienna Festival in 1995. He first appeared at the Royal Opera House in 2001, as Orfeo in Haydn's L'anima del filosofo, followed by a concert performance of Richard Strauss's Daphne as Leukippos. He also performed there the double role of Tenor and Bacchus in Strauss's Ariadne auf Naxos, and as Alexy Ivanovitch in Prokofiev's The Gambler.

While he is regarded as a leading Mozart tenor, he included 20th-century roles in his repertoire, such as Fritz in Schreker's Der ferne Klang, Walter in Weinberg's Die Passagierin, the Emperor in Die Frau ohne Schatten, and the title roles of Pfitzner's Palestrina and Britten's Peter Grimes. At the Bayreuth Festival, he appeared as Loge in Das Rheingold, staged by Frank Castorf in 2016 and 2017.
