= Cornelia Kallisch =

German operatic mezzo-soprano (born 1956)

- Born: 1956 (age 69–70); Marbach am Neckar, Germany
- Occupation: Operatic mezzo-soprano
- Organizations: Zürich Opera; Salzburg Festival

Cornelia Kallisch (born 1956) is a German operatic mezzo-soprano who made an international career. She has participated in premieres of operas and in concert, and in award-winning recordings.

== Early life ==
Born in Marbach am Neckar, Kallisch first studied violin and piano. She studied voice with Josef Metternich and the opera studio of the Bavarian State Opera. She also studied with Siglind Bruhn and Anna Reynolds.

== Career ==
Kallisch joined the ensemble of the Zürich Opera in 1991, where she performed parts such as Cherubino in Mozart's Le nozze di Figaro and the title role of Der Rosenkavalier by Richard Strauss. She took part in premieres of operas, such as in 1998 Heinz Holliger's Schneewittchen in Zürich, conducted by the composer, HK Gruber's Der Herr Nordwind and in 1999 Philippe Boesmans' Wintermärchen at La Monnaie in Brussels, conducted by Antonio Pappano.

In concert, she recorded Mahler's Kindertotenlieder in 1998, with Michael Gielen conducting the SWR Sinfonieorchester Baden-Baden und Freiburg. A reviewer noted: "There is a level of emotion in her singing which conjures up for us the right amount of both compassion and horror with Mahler's texts. She sings with a clear tone, some but not excessive vibrato, and handles Mahler's complex writing very ably." She sang the alto solo part in the premiere of Wolfgang Rihm's Deus Passus – Passions-Stücke nach Lukas on 29 August 2000, with Helmuth Rilling conducting the Gächinger Kantorei and Bach-Collegium Stuttgart, alongside Juliane Banse, Iris Vermillion, Christoph Prégardien and Andreas Schmidt. She recorded in 2002 the mezzo-soprano part of Mahler's Das Lied von der Erde, again with Gielen conducting the orchestra of the SWR. A detailed review mentions "the closing pages are suitably inward and lonely, her final, murmured Ewig seemingly emerging from silence".

Three recordings in which she participated were nominated for a Grammy Award: in 1994 Wagner's Die Meistersinger von Nürnberg in the category Best Opera Recording, in 2001 Rihm's Deus Passus in the category Best Choral Performance, and in 2003 her performance of Judith, the leading female role in Bartók's opera Bluebeard’s Castle, conducted by Péter Eötvös.
