= Patrick Davin =

Belgian orchestra conductor (1962–2020)

- Born: 16 February 1962; Huy, Belgium
- Died: 9 September 2020 (aged 58); Brussels, Belgium
- Occupation: Orchestra conductor

Patrick Davin (16 February 1962 – 9 September 2020) was a Belgian orchestra conductor.

== Biography ==
Davin began studying violin at the Académie de Huy, then at the Royal Conservatory of Liège, where he took courses in violin, piano, harmonics, and fugue. He continued his education at the Conservatoire de Toulon.

Davin was a pupil of René Defossez, Pierre Boulez, and Peter Eötvös. He helped many contemporary composers create their works, such as Philippe Boesmans, Henri Pousseur, Bruno Mantovani, Jean-Louis Agobet, Marco Stroppa, and Vinko Globokar. He served as musical and artistic director of the Orchestre symphonique de Mulhouse from 2013 to 2020. In July 2020, he became director of the music department of the Royal Conservatory of Liège.

Patrick Davin died in Brussels on 9 September 2020 at the age of 58.
