= Marc-André Dalbavie =

French composer (born 1961)

Marc-André Dalbavie (born 10 February 1961 at Neuilly-sur-Seine, France) is a French composer. He had his first music lessons at age 6. He attended the Conservatoire de Paris, where he studied composition with Marius Constant and orchestration with Pierre Boulez. In 1985 he joined the research department of IRCAM where he studied digital synthesis, computer assisted composition and spectral analysis. In the early 1990s he moved to Berlin. Currently he lives in the town of St. Cyprien and teaches orchestration at the Conservatoire de Paris.

In 1994 he was awarded the Rome Prize. The same year he was one of three composers who won the Ernst von Siemens Composers' Prize. In 1998, the Cleveland Orchestra appointed him the composer-in-residence (a Daniel Lewis Fellow) for two years. In 2004, he was made a Chevalier des Arts et Lettres by the French Ministry of Culture. In 2018 he was awarded the Chamber Music Society of Lincoln Center's Elise L. Stoeger Prize.

== Selected works ==
=== Orchestral ===
- Les miroirs transparents (1986)
- Concertino (1994)
- The Dream of the Unified Space, concerto for orchestra (1999)
- Concertate il suono (2000)
- Color (2001)
- Ciaccona (2002)
- Palimpseste (2002)
- Rocks under the Water (2002)
- Sinfonietta (2005)
- Variations orchestrales (2006)
- La source d'un regard (2007)
- Melodia (2008)

=== Concertante ===
- Diadèmes for viola solo, instrumental ensemble and electronic ensemble (1986)
- Violin Concerto (1996)
- Antiphonie, double concerto for clarinet, basset horn and orchestra (1999)
- La marche des transitoires for oboe and ensemble (2005)
- Piano Concerto (2005)
- Flute Concerto (2006)
- Concertino for Piano and String Orchestra (2007)
- Fantaisies for cello and ensemble (2008–09)
- Oboe Concerto (2009–10)
- Cello Concerto (2013)
- Vivaldi Fantasie for violin and orchestra or ensemble (2013)

=== Chamber ===
- Les paradis mécaniques for piccolo, flute, two clarinets, two trumpets, horn, two trombones, tuba and piano (1986)
- Élégie for flute solo (1990)
- Petit interlude for tuba or bass saxhorn solo (1992)
- Petit interlude for viola and piano (1992)
- In Advance of the Broken Time for flute, clarinet, violin, viola, cello and piano (1994)
- Tactus for clarinet, bassoon, horn, string quintet and piano (1996)
- Palimpseste, sextet for flute, clarinet, violin, viola, cello and piano (2002)
- Axiom, quartet for clarinet, bassoon, trumpet and piano (2004)
- Trio for Violin, Horn and Piano (2005)
- Chant Récitation Danse for six percussionists (2007)
- Piano Trio (2008)
- Interlude for solo cello (2010)
- Piano Quartet (2012)
- String Quartet (2012)
- Nocturne for flute and piano (2012)

=== Vocal ===
- Seuils for soprano, orchestra and electronics (1991)
- Correspondances for soprano, alto, baritone, chamber ensemble and electronics (1997)
- Sextine Cyclus for soprano and chamber orchestra (2000)
- Ligne de fuite for solo voice (2001); words by Guy Lelong
- Double Jeu for soprano and two ensembles (2003); text by Ezra Pound
- Sonnets sur un poème de Louise Labé for countertenor and orchestra (2008)
- Trois Chansons Populaires for voice and orchestra (2013)
- Trois mélodies pour voix et piano (2013)

=== Choral ===
- Instances for chorus (12 voices) and orchestra (1989)
- Offertoire for male chorus and orchestra (1995, for the Requiem of Reconciliation)
- Non-lieu for four groups of female chorus and ensemble (1997)
- Mobiles for chorus and orchestra (2001); words by Guy Lelong
- Chants for six men's voices, with percussion, harp, and piano (2003)
- Comptines for children's chorus, harp, piano, and percussion (2005)

=== Operas ===
- Gesualdo (premiered in Zürich in 2010)
- Charlotte Salomon (Salzburg Festival, 28 July 2014)
- Le Soulier de satin (premiered at Opéra national de Paris in 2021)
- Melancholie des Widerstands / Mélancolie de la résistance, Filmische Oper – (premiered at Berlin State Opera 30 July 2024)
