= Reigen (opera) =

Opera by Philippe Boesmans

- Opera by Philippe Boesmans
- Translation: Round Dance
- Librettist: Luc Bondy
- Language: German
- Based on: Arthur Schnitzler's Der Reigen
- Premiere: 1993; La Monnaie, Brussels

Reigen (German 'Round Dance') is a German-language opera in ten scenes by Philippe Boesmans to a libretto by Luc Bondy after Arthur Schnitzler's play La Ronde (1897). The opera was premiered at La Monnaie, Brussels in 1993.

== Scenes ==
1. The Whore and the Soldier
2. The Soldier and the Parlor Maid
3. The Parlor Maid and the Young Gentleman
4. The Young Gentleman and the Young Wife
5. The Young Wife and The Husband
6. The Husband and the Little Miss
7. The Little Miss and the Poet
8. The Poet and the Actress
9. The Actress and the Count
10. The Count and the Whore

== Roles ==
- Die Dirne, Leocadia (soprano)
- Der Soldat, Franz (tenor)
- Das Stubenmädchen, Mizzi (mezzosoprano)
- Der junge Herr, Alfred (tenor)
- Die junge Frau, Emma (soprano)
- Der Gatte, Gottfried (baritone)
- Das süße Mädel (mezzosoprano)
- Der Dichter, Robert (tenor)
- Die Sängerin (soprano)
- Der Graf (baritone)

== Recordings ==
- 1994 – Deborah Raymond (Die Dirne), Mark Curtis (Der Soldat), Elzbieta Ardam (Das Stubenmädchen), Roberto Saccà (Der junge Herr), Solveig Kringelborn (Die junge Frau), Franz-Ferdinand Nentwig (Der Gatte), Randi Stene (Das süße Mädel), Ronald Hamilton (Der Dichter), Françoise Pollet (Die Sängerin), Dale Duesing (Der Graf). Ricercar 133122/123, Orchestre Symphonique de la Monnaie, Sylvain Cambreling reissued digitally Cypres. OCLC 659244085
