= Jules Seveste =

Jules Seveste (full name Désiré Henri Jules Seveste; 1803 in Paris – 30 June 1854 in Meudon) was a French playwright and theatre manager of the first half of the 19th century.

== Short biography ==
In 1822 his father Pierre Seveste (1773–1825) appointed Jules and his brother Edmond to his theatre agency (founded c. 1810) which in 1817 had been granted a privilege to open suburban theaters. Pierre had opened the Théâtre Montparnasse in 1819, and he and his sons opened the Théâtre de Montmartre in 1822. After Pierre's death, his widow and sons opened the Théâtre de Belleville in 1827 and the Théâtre Grenelle in 1830. In 1848, Jules asked for the reopening of the Belleville and Montmartre theatres.

On 1 September 1852, Jules succeeded his brother Edmond as managing director of the Opéra-National, after Adolphe Adam refused the position. On 12 April 1853, he renamed it Théâtre Lyrique. Jules Verne, co-librettist with Michel Carré of the one-act opéra-comique Le Colin-Maillard, which Seveste produced on 28 April 1853, became the secretary with a salary of 1,200 francs a year, an office Verne would leave in 1855.

Jules Seveste died of a massive stroke Friday, 30 June 1854, at ten o'clock at night and not from cholera as often indicated.

== Works ==
- 1825: Christophe et Lubin, comédie vaudeville in 1 act, with Edmond Seveste
- 1827: La Lanterne, vaudeville, avec Edmond Seveste
- 1832: La Sylphide, drama in 2 acts, with Ernest Jaime
- 1833: L'Élève de la nature, ou Jeanne et Jenny, play in 5 acts and 2 parts, with E. Jaime
- 1836: Amaglia ou la Fille du diable, drame fantastique in 5 acts, with Émile Vanderbuck
- 1852: Les fiançailles des roses, opéra comique, with Charles Deslys

== Bibliography ==
- Discours prononcés sur la tombe de M. Jules Seveste, 1854
- Philippe Chauveau, Les théâtres parisiens disparus: 1402-1986, 1999, (p. 322)
- Jules Verne et la musique, Revue Jules Verne n°24, 2007, (p. 97)
- McCormick, John (1995). "Seveste, Pierre-Jacques", pp. 977–978, in The Cambridge Guide to the Theatre, edited by Martin Banham. Cambridge: Cambridge University Press. ISBN 9780521434379.
