= Yann Beuron =

French operatic tenor

Yann Beuron (born 1969) is a French operatic tenor.

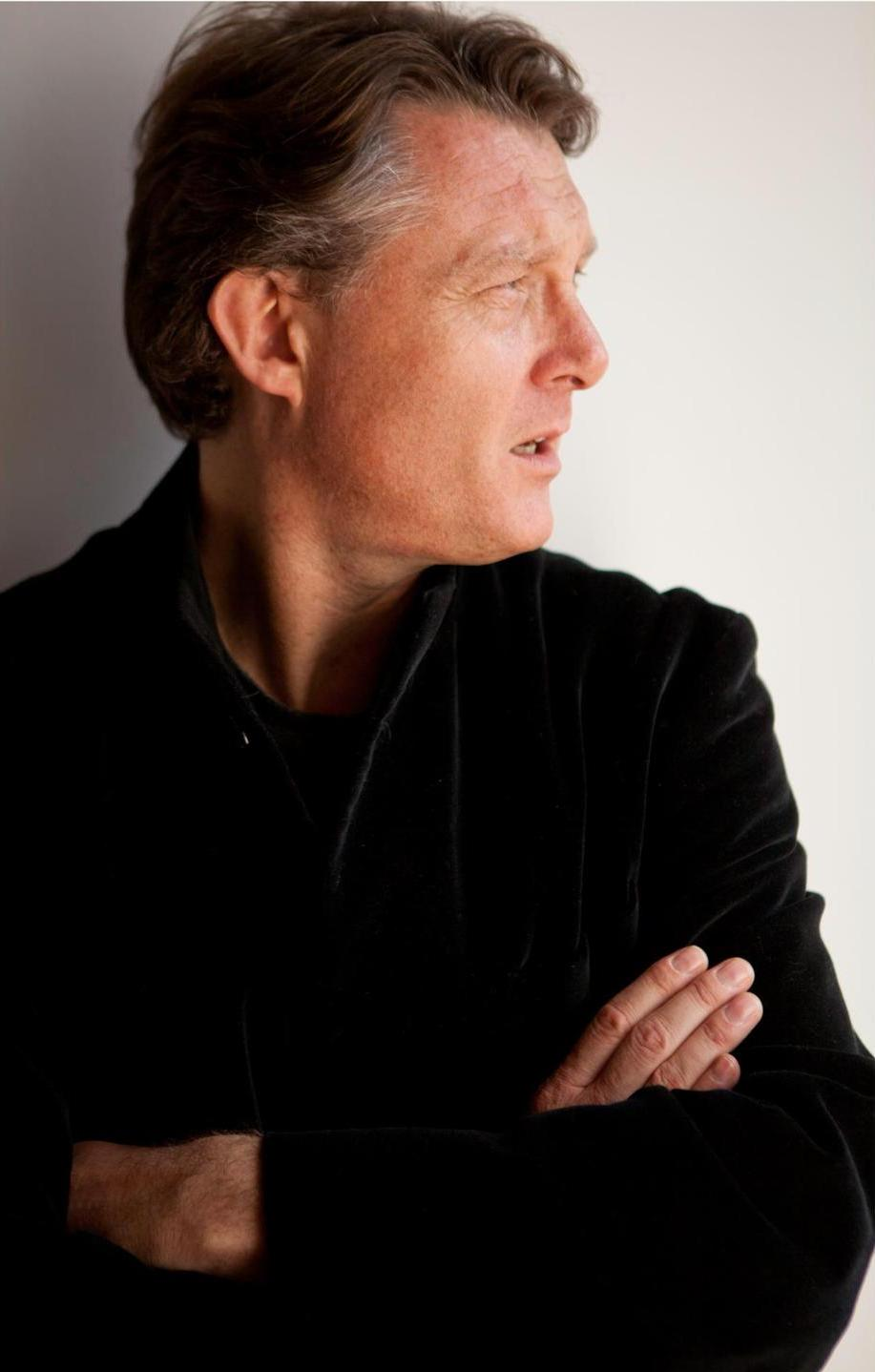
Yann Beuron

== Biography ==
Yann Beuron studied at the Conservatoire de Paris where he won first prize in singing and graduated in 1996. He made his debut in 1995 at the Opéra national du Rhin in 1995 in the role of Belmonte in Mozart's Die Entführung aus dem Serail and his Paris Opera debut in Hippolyte et Aricie by Rameau in 1996. Yann Beuron is particularly associated with the music of Mozart and French music and has appeared as Pelléas in Debussy's Pelléas et Mélisande in numerous European opera houses. Yann Beuron has also appeared in a number of highly acclaimed productions of Offenbach operettas directed by Laurent Pelly, including the role of Orpheus in Orphée aux enfers in Geneva in 1997, Paris in La belle Hélène at the Théâtre du Châtelet, Paris in 2000, Fritz in La Grande-Duchesse de Gérolstein, in 2004, also at the Châtelet, and as Fridolin XXIV in Le roi Carotte at the Opéra de Lyon in 2015, all of which were filmed and televised.

In June 2020 Beuron announced that he would be retiring from the opera stage and this was confirmed after he sang Don Pelage in the world premiere in Paris of Manoel de Oliveira's Le Soulier de satin, based on the 1943 play by Paul Claudel.
