= Philippe Boesmans =

Belgian pianist, composer and teacher (1936–2022)

- Born: 17 May 1936; Tongeren, Belgium
- Died: 10 April 2022 (aged 85); Brussels, Belgium
- Education: Royal Conservatory of Liège
- Occupations: Pianist; Composer; Academic teacher
- Organizations: RTBF; La Monnaie; Royal Conservatory of Liège
- Awards: International Opera Award

Philippe Boesmans (17 May 1936 – 10 April 2022) was a Belgian pianist, composer and academic teacher. He studied to be a pianist at the Royal Conservatory of Liège, and was self-taught as a composer, influenced by the Liège Group of Henri Pousseur, André Souris, and Célestin Deliège, and by attending the Darmstädter Ferienkurse. He worked for the Radio Télévision Belge de la Communauté Française (RTBF) from 1961, as a producer from 1971.

Boesman became primarily recognised for his operas, with works written for the Royal Opera House La Monnaie in Brussels as composer in residence since 1985. Four operas were written in collaboration with Luc Bondy who adapted plays for him, Schnitzler's La Ronde, Shakespeare's The Winter's Tale, Strindberg's Miss Julie and Iwona, księżniczka Burgunda by Witold Gombrowicz, and who directed the world premieres of the operas. Au monde was honoured with an International Opera Award in 2015. His last opera based on Feydeau's vaudeville 'On purge bébé' had its world premiere at La Monnaie in Brussels in December 2022.

== Life ==
Boesmans was born in Tongeren and studied piano at the Royal Conservatory of Liège, He studied first with Robert Leudiran, then with Stefan Askenase who advised him to not pursue a career as a concert pianist. At the conservatoire, he was also introduced to serial composition techniques by Pierre Froidebise. However, it was only after coming into contact with the "Liège Group" of Henri Pousseur, André Souris, and Célestin Deliège) in 1957 that he began to write music, as a self-taught composer. He attended courses at Darmstädter Ferienkurse. He was also active as a pianist with the Ensemble Musique Nouvelle. In 1961 he became assistant, and in 1971 producer, at the Radio Télévision Belge de la Communauté Française (RTBF), working with the radio orchestra there. From this experience he learned much about composing and orchestrating music. In 1965, he became a member of the Communist Party. In 1971 he won the Prix Italia for his composition Upon La-Mi for horn and voice which won him international recognition. In 1971, he participated in productions of the Centre de Recherches Musicales de Wallonie, collaborating with Pousseur. His works have been performed at the most important festivals of contemporary music, such as Darmstadt, Warsaw, Brussels, Royan, Metz, Avignon, Zagreb, Montréal and Paris. For a short time, Boesmans taught piano and composition at the Royal Conservatory of Liège.

He was composer in residence at the La Monnaie opera house in Brussels. Luc Bondy adapted four operas for him and subsequently staged their world premieres. When his opera Reigen was premiered in 1993, a reviewer of Le Monde wrote: "Reigen is perhaps the most successful opera of the last seventy years." His opera Au monde won the International Opera Award 2015 in the category World Premiere. He was bilingual in German and French.

Boesmans died after a short illness on 10 April 2022 in Brussels, at the age of 85. He was honoured in a tribute concert at the Royal Opera House La Monnaie/De Munt on 19 April 2022.

== Composition style ==
Boesmans early works were strongly influenced by serialism. After that, clear structures, periodically recurring rhythms, consonances and melodic elements characterise his musical language. The aesthetics of his works has been called "trompe l'oreille" (trick the ear). His instrumentations are characterised by intense timbre constellations. He alluded to works of others not by exact quotations, but so-called "stylistic quotations" or "gestural quotations".

== Works ==
Operas

- La Passion de Gilles (1983), libretto by Pierre Mertens
- Reigen (1993); libretto by Luc Bondy based on Schnitzler's Der Reigen (La Ronde).
- Wintermärchen (1999), libretto by Bondy based on Shakespeare's The Winter's Tale.
- Julie (2005); libretto by Bondy based on Strindberg's Miss Julie.
- Yvonne, princesse de Bourgogne (2009), libretto by Bondy based on Iwona, księżniczka Burgunda.
- Poppea e Nerone (2012), new orchestration for a modern chamber orchestra of Monteverdi's L'incoronazione di Poppea. First performed at Teatro Real in Madrid, conducted by Sylvain Cambreling and directed by Krzysztof Warlikowski.
- Au monde (2014), libretto by Joël Pommerat after his own play.
- Pinocchio (2017), libretto by Pommerat after Collodi's 1883 The Adventures of Pinocchio.
- On Purge bébé! (2022), libretto by Richard Brunel after a play by Georges Feydeau, to be premiered posthumously in December 2022.

Other compositions

- Violin Concerto (1980)
- String Quartet No. 1 (1988)
- Surfing for viola and orchestra (1990)
- Love and Dance Tunes for baritone and piano (1993); settings from Shakespeare's sonnets
- Summer Dreams, String Quartet No. 2 (1994)

== Discography ==
- Trakl Lieder; String Quartet [No. 1]; Surfing. Françoise Pollet (soprano), Orchestre du Théâtre Royal de la Monnaie, conducted by Sylvain Cambreling; Arditti String Quartet; Christophe Desjardins (viola), Ensemble Musique Nouvelle, conducted by Georges Elie Octors. Trakl Lieder recorded live, Palais des Beaux-Arts, Brussels, 14 April 1990; String Quartet recorded at the Royal Conservatory of Liège, 24 March 1990; Surfing recorded at the Palais des Beaux-Arts, Brussels, 4 June 1990. CD recording, 1 audio disc: digital, 12 cm, stereo. Ricercar RIC 083065. Anloy: SPRL Ricercar, [n.d.]. OCLC 25875206
- Reigen (in German), Ricercar; Distrib. Musidisc, 1995, OCLC 659244085
- Wintermärchen (in German), Deutsche Grammophon; distribution: Universal Division Polydor, 2001, OCLC 658728338 Dale Duesing; Susan Chilcott; Antonio Pappano. Sung in German; in scene four, the language changes from German to English and Boesmans introduces AKA Moon, a jazz/funk group.
- Julie. Garry Magee, Malena Ernman, Monnaie Chamber Orchestra, Kazushi Ōno. CD recording. Cypres (CYP4626), 2005. OCLC 315734451
- Yvonne, princesse de Bourgogne (in French), Kastafior, 2010, OCLC 873502768 Opéra National de Paris Mireille Delunsch and Yann Beuron. Cypres, 2011 Klangforum Wien, Sylvain Cambreling. Diapason d'Or

== Filmography ==
- Julie. Garry Magee, Malena Ernman, Kerstin Avemo, Monnaie Chamber Orchestra, Kazushi Ōno. DVD recording. BelAir, 2005. OCLC 605048279

== Awards ==
- 1971: Prix Italia
- 2000: Prix Arthur Honegger
- 2004: SACD Music Prize
