= Laurent Pelly =

French opera and theatre director (born 1962)

Laurent Pelly (born 14 January 1962 in Paris) is a French opera and theatre director.

== Biography ==
In 1980 (at the age of 18) he founded the Compagnie Théâtrale du Pélican which, from 1982, he co-directed with Agathe Mélinand. In 1994, he became an artist in association with Le Centre Dramatique National des Alpes (CDNA), Grenoble being appointed director from 1997 to 2007. From 2008 to 2018 he was co-director, with Agathe Mélinand, of Théâtre national de Toulouse Midi-Pyrénées (TNT).

Many of Laurent Pelly's productions have been filmed for DVD and broadcast on worldwide television.

== Theatre productions ==
1977 : L'Ombre by Evguéni Schwartz, Théâtre Daniel Sorano Vincennes

== Le Pélican ==
1980 : Si jamais je te pince !... by Eugène Labiche, Théâtre Daniel Sorano Vincennes
1982 : Le Dîner bourgeois by Henry Monnier, Théâtre Daniel Sorano Vincennes
1983 : Le Dîner bourgeois by Henry Monnier, Théâtre de la Plaine
1984 : Chambres calmes vue sur la mer by Michel Jourdheuil, Théâtre de la Plaine
1984 : En cas de pluie by Philippe Beglia
1984 : Quel amour d'enfant ! by Comtesse de Ségur
1984 : Comment ça va ? Au secours ! by Vladimir Maïakovski
1984 : Comment j'ai écrit certains de mes livres by Raymond Roussel
1986 : Chat en poche by Georges Feydeau, Centre dramatique national de Béthune
1987 : Chat en poche by Georges Feydeau, Théâtre Firmin Gémier Antony
1989 : Madame Angot by Maillot, Théâtre national de Chaillot
1990 : Un cœur sous une soutane-Tentative de commémoration production based upon Arthur Rimbaud, Théâtre national de Chaillot
1991 : Eva Perón by Copi, Théâtre national de Chaillot
1994 : Talking Heads by Alan Bennett, Théâtre Paris-Villette
1994 : La Famille Fenouillard by Christophe

== Centre Dramatique National des Alpes ==
1995 : L'Heureux Stratagème by Marivaux
1996 : En caravane by Elizabeth von Arnim, Théâtre Paris-Villette
1996 : La Baye by Philippe Adrien
1996 : La Danse de mort by August Strindberg
1997 : Souingue!
1998 : Et Vian! En avant la zique!
1998 : Loretta Strong by Copi
2001 : C'est pas la vie ? by Laurent Pelly and Agathe Mélinand, Théâtre de Sartrouville
2002 : Le Voyage de monsieur Perrichon by Eugène Labiche
2002 : J'en ai marre de l'amour
2003 : Vendre by Laurent Pelly and Agathe Mélinand
2003 : Les Chaises by Eugène Ionesco, Théâtre de la Criée
2004 : Le Roi nu by Evguéni Schwartz
2005 : Foi, amour, espérance by Ödön von Horváth
2005 : I cosmonauti russi
2006 : Le Songe by August Strindberg
2006 : Les Aventures d'Alice au pays des merveilles by Lewis Carroll
2006 : Une visite inopportune by Copi, Théâtre de l'Ouest parisien
2006 : Les Malices de Plick et Plock by Christophe, Théâtre de Sartrouville

== TNT-Théâtre national de Toulouse Midi-Pyrénées ==
2008 : Le Roi nu byEvguéni Schwartz
2008 : Les Aventures d'Alice au pays des merveilles by Lewis Carroll
2008 : Jacques ou la soumission and L'avenir est dans les œufs by Eugène Ionesco, Théâtre de l'Athénée-Louis-Jouvet
2008 : Le Menteur by Carlo Goldoni
2009 : Renseignements généraux by Serge Valletti
2009 : Talking Heads by Alan Bennett, Théâtre du Rond-Point, Théâtre Marigny
2009 : Cami la vie drôle ! by Pierre Henri Cami
2009 : Natalie Dessay, songs by Michel Legrand
2010 : Le Roi nu by Evguéni Schwartz, Théâtre de la Tempête
2010 : Mille francs de récompense by Victor Hugo
2010 : Funérailles d'hiver by Hanoch Levin
2011 : Les Aventures de Sindbad le Marin by Agathe Mélinand
2011 : J'ai examiné une ampoule électrique et j'en ai été satisfait, script by Daniil Harms
2012 : Macbeth by William Shakespeare
2013 : Mangeront-ils ? by Victor Hugo
2014 : Songe d'une nuit d'été de William Shakespeare
2015 : L'Oiseau vert de Carlo Gozzi
2016 : La Cantatrice chauve de Eugène Ionesco
2017 : Les Oiseaux d'Aristophane
2017 : Sur la tête - Jacques Prévert

== Odéon-Théâtre de l'Europe ==
1995 : Peines d'amour perdues by William Shakespeare
2011: Mille francs de récompense by Victor Hugo

== Festival d'Avignon ==
1997 : Des Héros et des dieux from Hymnes homériques
1998 : Vie et mort du roi Jean by William Shakespeare

== Comédie-Française ==
2011 : L'Opéra de quat'sous by Bertolt Brecht and Kurt Weill

== Théâtre Nanterre-Amandiers ==
2013: Macbeth by William Shakespeare

== Pel-Mel Groupe ==
2021 : Harvey by Mary Chase, TNP-VilleurbanneLyon, Théâtre du Rond Point Paris and on tour
2022 : L'Imprésario de Smyrne/Scènes de la vie d'Opéra by Goldoni Théâtre Le Vilar Louvain-la-Neuve, Théâtre Royal du Parc Brussels, L'Athenée Théâtre Louis Jouvet Paris and on tour
2023 : Objet Inanimés after Hans Christian Andersen on tour Bourgogne-Franche-Comté

== Opera productions ==
1997 : Orphée aux Enfers, by Jacques Offenbach, Lyon and Genève
1999 : Platée, by Jean-Philippe Rameau, Opéra national de Paris. Revival: Santa Fe Opera
2000 : La Belle Hélène, by Jacques Offenbach, Théâtre du Châtelet, Paris. Revival: English National Opera, Santa Fe Opera
2001 : Les Sept Péchés capitaux, by Kurt Weill and Bertolt Brecht, Opéra national de Paris
2002 : La Périchole, by Jacques Offenbach, Opéra de Marseille 2003,
2004 : Ariadne auf Naxos, by Richard Strauss, Opéra national de Paris
2003 : Les Contes d'Hoffmann, by Jacques Offenbach, Lausanne Opera, Opéra de Lyon
2004 : La Grande-duchesse de Gérolstein, by Jacques Offenbach, Théâtre du Châtelet, Paris. Revival: Grand Théâtre de Genève
2004 : Les Boréades, by Jean-Philippe Rameau, Opéra de Lyon
2004 : L'heure espagnole, by Maurice Ravel / Gianni Schicchi, by Puccini, Opéra national de Paris. Revival: Seiji Ozawa Festival
2006 : Le Roi malgré lui, by Emmanuel Chabrier, Opéra de Lyon
2006 : L'Amour des trois oranges, by Sergey Prokofiev, Dutch National Opera. Revival: Theater Essen
2006 : Cendrillon, by Jules Massenet, Santa Fe Opera
2006 : L'élisir d'amore by Gaetano Donizetti, Opéra national de Paris. Co-production Royal Opera House, London. Revival: Maarinsky Theatre
2007 : La fille du régiment, by Donizetti, Royal Opera House, Covent Garden. Co-production Wiener Staatsoper, Metropolitan Opera New York. Revival: Opéra national de Paris, Teatro Real Madrid, Teatr de la Maestranza Seville, Chicago Lyric Opera
2007 : La vie parisienne, by Jacques Offenbach, Opéra de Lyon Revival: TNT Théâtre de Toulouse Midi-Pyrénées
2007 : La finta semplice, by Mozart, Theater an der Wien
2007 : Le château de Barbe-Bleue, by Béla Bartók, Opéra de Lyon
2007 : Parlez-moi d'amour, Théâtre Royal de la Monnaie (staged songs with Felicity Lott)
2007 : La voix humaine, by Francis Poulenc, Opéra de Lyon
2008 : Hänsel und Gretel, by Humperdinck, Glyndebourne Festival Revival: Opéra de Lyon, Teatro Real Madrid, Seattle Opera
2009 : Pelléas et Mélisande, by Claude Debussy Theater an der Wien
2009 : La traviata, by Giuseppe Verdi, Santa Fe Opera, Revival: Teatro Massimo, Palermo, Teatro Regio Turin
2009 : Le Roi malgré lui, by Emmanuel Chabrier, Opéra-Comique, Paris
2010 : Manon, by Jules Massenet, Royal Opera House, Covent Garden Co-production Teatro all Scala Milan, Metropolitan Opera New York, Grand Théâtre du Capitôle de Toulouse
2010 : Don Quichotte, by Jules Massenet, La Monnaie/de Munt
2011 : Giulio Cesare, by Handel, Opéra national de Paris. Revival: Teatro Regio Turin, NNTT Tokyo
2011 : Cendrillon, by Jules Massenet, Royal Opera House, Covent Garden. Co-production La Monnaie Brussels, Opéra de Lille. Revivals: Chicago Lyric Opera, Metropolitan Opera New York, Teatro Real Madrid, National Taichung Theatre Taiwan
2012 : L'enfant et les sortilèges/L'heure espagnol, by Ravel, Glyndebourne Festival. Revival: Ozawa Matsumoto Festival, Teatro alla Scala Milan
2012 : Robert le Diable, by Meyerbeer, Royal Opera House, Covent Garden
2013 : Les contes d'Hoffmann, by Jacques Offenbach, Opéra de Lyon. Co-production Teatre del Liceu Barcelona, San Francisco Opera. Revival Deutsche Oper Berlin
2013 : I Puritani, by Bellini, Opéra national de Paris (Bastille)
2014 : Le Comte Ory, by Rossini, Opéra de Lyon. Co-production Tearo alla Scala Milan
2014 : Don Pasquale, by Donizetti, Santa Fe Opera, Co-production Teatre del Liceu Barcelona, San Francisco Opera. Revival La Monnaie Brussels
2014 : L'Étoile, by Emmanuel Chabrier, Dutch National Opera
2015 : Le Roi Carotte, by Jacques Offenbach, l'Opéra de Lyon. Revival": Opéra de Lille
2016 : Le médecin malgré lui, By Gounod, Théâtre des nations, Geneva
2016 : Béatrice et Bénédict, by Hector Berlioz, Glyndebourne Festival
2016 : Le Coq d'or, by Rimski Korsakov, La Monnaie/de Munt. Co-production Teatro Real Madrid, Opéran national de Lorraine
2017 : Viva la mamma! by Donizetti, Opéra de Lyon. Co-production Teatro Real Madrid, Grand Théâtre de Genève (Théâtre des Nations)
2017 : Il barbiere di Siviglia, by Rossini, Théâtre des Champs-Élysées. Co-production Opéra de Marseille, Grand Théâtre de Luxembourg, Edinburgh Festival, Opéra national de Bordeaux
2018 : Candide de Leonard Bernstein à L'Opéra de Santa Fé
2018 : Lucia di Lammermoor, by Donizetti, Philadelphia Opera. Co-production Vienna State Opera
2019 : Falstaff, by Verdi, Teatro Real, Madrid, Co-production Nikikai Opera Foundation, La Monnaie Brussels
2019 : Barbe bleue, by Jacques Offenbach, Opéra de Lyon. Co-production Opéra de Marseille
2019 : La Cenerentola by Rossini, Dutch National Opera. Co-production Palau de les Arts Reina Sofia, Valencia. Revival: Los Angeles Opera
2021 : Il nozze di Figaro by Mozart, Santa Fe Opera [archive] . Revival: Seiji Ozawa Matsumoto Festival
2021 : Cendrillon by Massenet, Metropolitan Opera New York (new holiday version, new English translation)
2022 : Cosí fan tutte by Mozart, Théâtre des Champs Elysés, Paris. Coproduction Nikikai Opera Foundation
2022 : A Midsummer Night's Dream by Britten, Opéra de Lille
2022 : La Voix Humaine / Les Mamelles de Tirésias by Poulenc, Glyndebourne Festival
2022 : Lakmé by Delibes, Opéra Comique. Co-production Opéra national du Rhin
2022 : La Périchole by Offenbach, Théâtre des Champs Elysées. Co-production Opéra de Dijon
2023 : Le Voyage dans la Lune by Offenbach, Opéra Comique. Co-production Greek National Opera. Revival: Vienna Volksoper
2023 : Eugene Onegin by Tchaikovsky, La Monnaie, Bruxelles. Co-production Royal Danish Opera [archive], Copenhagen
2023 : Il Turco in Italia by Rossini, Teatro Real, Madrid
2024 : Die Meistersinger von Nürnberg by Wagner, Teatro Real, Madrid
2024 : Le Chauve Souris by Johann Strauss, Opéra de Lille
2026 : The Bartered Bride by Smetana, Teatro Real, Madrid

== See also ==
- List of opera directors
