= Les Troyens discography =

This is a partial discography of Hector Berlioz's opera, Les Troyens. Its first performance on 4 November 1863 consisted of Acts 3 to 5 only. The first staged performance of the whole opera took place in 1890, 21 years after Berlioz's death.

Colin Davis's recording in 1969 (released in 1970) was the first complete recording of this opera.

== Audio recordings ==
Year	Cast (Enée, Chorèbe, Panthée, Narbal, Iopas, Hylas, Ascagne, Cassandre, Didon, Anna)	Conductor, Opera house and orchestra	Label
1947	Jean Giraudeau, Charles Cambon, Charles Paul, Charles Cambon, Frans Vroons, Colin Cunningham, Irène Joachim, Marisa Ferrer, Marisa Ferrer, Yvonne Corke	Thomas Beecham; Royal Philharmonic Orchestra; BBC Theatre chorus (Recorded live, June–July)	CD: Malibran Music; Cat: CDRG 162
1957	Jon Vickers, Jess Walters, Michael Langdon, David Kelly, Richard Verreau, Dermot Troy, Joan Carlyle, Amy Shuard, Blanche Thebom, Lauris Elms	Rafael Kubelík; Royal Opera House orchestra and chorus (Recorded live, 20 June); In English	CD: Testament; Cat: SBT4 1443
1959–1960	Richard Cassilly, Martial Singher, Kenneth Smith, John Dennison, William Lewis, Glade Peterson, Frances Wyatt, Eleanor Steber, Regina Resnik, Regina Sarfaty	Robert Lawrence; American Opera Society orchestra and chorus (Recorded live at Carnegie Hall, acts 1 & 2 on 29 December and acts 3–5 on 12 January)	CD: Vai Audio; Cat: VAIA 1006-3
1965	Guy Chauvet, N/A, Jean-Pierre Hurteau, Lucien Vernet, Gérard Dunan, N/A, Jane Berbié, Régine Crespin, Régine Crespin, Marie-Luce Bellary	Georges Prêtre; Opéra national de Paris orchestra and chorus Excerpts only	LP: His Master's Voice; Cat: SLS771; ASD 2276-2277
1969	Nicolai Gedda, Robert Massard, Robert Amis El Hage, Boris Carmeli, Veriano Luchetti, Carlo Gaifa, Rosina Cavicchiola, Marilyn Horne, Shirley Verrett, Giovanna Fioroni	Georges Prêtre; RAI National Symphony Orchestra and chorus (Recorded live, 11 December)	CD: Arkadia; Cat: 461
1969	Jon Vickers, Peter Glossop, Anthony Raffell, Roger Soyer, Ian Partridge, Ryland Davies, Anne Howells, Berit Lindholm, Josephine Veasey, Heather Begg	Colin Davis; Royal Opera House orchestra and chorus The Wandsworth School Boys' Choir (Recorded at Walthamstow Town Hall, September–October) (1971 Grammy Award for Best Opera Recording)	LP: Philips; Cat: 6709 002; CD: Philips; Cat: 416 432-2
1976	Guy Chauvet, Wolfgang Schöne, Peter Wimberger, Nicola Ghiuselev, Horst Laubenthal, N/A, Sona Ghazarian, Helga Dernesch, Christa Ludwig, Margarita Lilowa	Gerd Albrecht, Vienna State Opera orchestra and chorus (Recorded live, 17 October)	CD: Gala; Cat: GL 100.609
1984	Edward Sooter, Allan Monk, John Cheek, Paul Plishka, Douglas Ahlstedt, Philip Creech, Claudia Catania, Jessye Norman, Jessye Norman, Jocelyne Taillon	James Levine; Metropolitan Opera orchestra and chorus (Recorded live, 18 February)	Streaming audio: Met Opera on Demand
1994	Gary Lakes, Gino Quilico, Michel Philippe, Jean-Philippe Courtis, Jean-Luc Maurette, John Mark Ainsley, Catherine Dubosc, Deborah Voigt, Françoise Pollet, Hélène Perraguin	Charles Dutoit; Montreal Symphony Orchestra orchestra and chorus	CD: Decca; Cat: 443 693-2
2000	Ben Heppner, Peter Mattei, Tigran Martirossian, Stephen Milling, Kenneth Tarver, Toby Spence, Isabelle Cals, Petra Lang, Michelle DeYoung, Sara Mingardo	Colin Davis; London Symphony Orchestra; London Symphony chorus (Recorded live at the Barbican Hall, December)	CD: LSO Live; Cat: LSO0010
2017	Michael Spyres, Stéphane Degout, Philippe Sly, Nicolas Courjal, Cyrille Dubois, Stanlislas de Barbeyrac, Marianne Crebassa; Marie-Nicole Lemieux, Joyce DiDonato, Hanna Hipp	John Nelson; Orchestre philharmonique de Strasbourg; Les Chœurs de l'Opéra national du Rhin; Badischer Staatsopernchor; Chœur philharmonique de Strasbourg (Recorded live at the Salle Érasme, 11–18 April)	CD: Erato; Cat: 0190295762209 (includes bonus DVD)

== Video recordings ==
Year	Cast (Enée, Chorèbe, Panthée, Narbal, Iopas, Hylas, Ascagne, Cassandre, Didon, Anna)	Conductor, Opera house and orchestra	Label
1983	Plácido Domingo, Allan Monk, John Cheek, Paul Plishka, Douglas Ahlstedt, Philip Creech, Claudia Catania, Jessye Norman, Tatiana Troyanos, Jocelyne Taillon	James Levine; Metropolitan Opera orchestra and chorus Designer: Peter Wexler (Recorded live, 4–8 October)	DVD: Deutsche Grammophon; Cat: 00440 073 4310; CD: Laser Disc: Pioneer Artists; Cat: PA-85-137; SD streaming video: Met Opera on Demand
2000	Jon Villars, Russell Braun, Tigran Martirossian, Robert Lloyd, Ilya Lavinsky, Toby Spence, Gaële Le Roi, Deborah Polaski, Deborah Polaski, Yvonne Naef	Sylvain Cambreling; Orchestre de Paris; Vienna State Opera chorus Slovak Philharmonic choir Tölzer Knabenchor (Recorded live at the Salzburg Festival, August)	DVD: Arthaus; Cat: 100 350/1
2003	Gregory Kunde, Ludovic Tézier, Nicolas Testé, Laurent Naouri, Mark Padmore, Topi Lehtipuu, Stéphanie d'Oustrac, Anna Caterina Antonacci, Susan Graham, Renata Pokupić	John Eliot Gardiner; Théâtre du Châtelet; Orchestre Révolutionnaire et Romantique; Monteverdi Choir; Théâtre du Châtelet chorus (Recorded live, October)	DVD/Blu-ray: Opus Arte; Cat: OA 0900 D
2010	Lance Ryan, Gabriele Viviani, Gorgio Guiseppini, Stephen Milling, Éric Cutler, Dmitri Voropaev, Oksana Shilova, Elisabete Matos; Daniele Barcellona, Zlata Bulicheva	Valery Gergiev; Orquestra de la Comunitat Valenciana; Cor de la Generalitat Valenciana	DVD/Blu-ray: C Major; Cat: 706008; Cat: 706104
2012	Bryan Hymel, Fabio Capitanucci, Ashley Holland, Brindley Sherratt, Ji-Min Park, Ed Lyon, Barbara Senator, Anna Caterina Antonacci, Eva-Maria Westbroek, Hanna Hipp	Antonio Pappano; Royal Opera House orchestra and chorus (Recorded live, 5–8 July)	DVD/Blu-ray: Opus Arte; Cat: 1097 D Cat: OABD7113D
2013	Bryan Hymel, Dwayne Croft, Richard Bernstein, Kwangchul Youn, Eric Cutler, Paul Appleby, Julie Boulianne, Deborah Voigt, Susan Graham, Karen Cargill	Fabio Luisi; Metropolitan Opera orchestra and chorus Production: Francesca Zambello (Recorded live, 5 January)	HD streaming video; Met Opera on Demand
2019	Brandon Jovanovich, Stéphane Degout, Christian Helmer, Christian Van Horn, Cyrille Dubois, Bror Magnus Tødenes, Michèle Losier, Stéphanie d'Oustrac, Ekaterina Semenchuk, Aude Extrémo	Philippe Jordan; Paris Opera Orchestra and Chorus; Stage director: Dmitri Tcherniakov (Recorded live, January, Opéra Bastille)	HD streaming video; Paris Opera Play
