= The Tales of Hoffmann discography =

This is a list of audio and video recordings (discography) of the 1881 French opera Les contes d'Hoffmann (The Tales of Hoffmann) by Jacques Offenbach.

== Audio recordings ==
1937: Maurice Abravanel, Metropolitan Opera; CD: Naxos Historical, Cat: 8.110011-2
Hoffmann: René Maison; Stella, Olympia, Giulietta, Antonia: Vina Bovy; Antonia's mother: Anna Kaskas; Nathanael: George Rasely; Hermann: Wilfred Engelmann	Coppélius, Dapertutto, Miracle, Lindorf: Lawrence Tibbett; Nicklausse: Irra Petina; Andrès/Cochenille/Pitichinaccio/Frantz: Angelo Badà; Spallanzani\Crespel: Louis d'Angelo; Schlemil: Norman Cordon
1948: André Cluytens, Theatre National de l'Opéra-Comique orchestra and chorus; CD: Naxos, Cat: 8.110214-15
Hoffmann: Raoul Jobin; Olympia: Renée Doria; Giulietta: Vina Bovy; Antonia: Géori Boué; Dapertutto: Charles Soix	Coppélius: André Pernet; Lindorf: Louis Musy; Miracle: Roger Bourdin; Nicklausse: Fanély Revoil; Andres\Cochenille\Pitichinaccio\Frantz: Bourvil
1950: Thomas Beecham, Royal Philharmonic Orchestra, sung in English (Note: This and the following German-language version were made simultaneously, primarily as a basis for the 1951 Powell and Pressburger film The Tales of Hoffmann); CD: SOMM «Beecham Edition» 13-2 (2002).
Hoffmann: Robert Rounseville; Olympia: Dorothy Bond; Giulietta: Margherita Grandi; Antonia: Ann Ayars	Coppélius, Dapertutto, Miracle, Lindorf: Bruce Dargavel; Nicklausse: Monica Sinclair; Frantz\Spallanzani: Grahame Clifford; Hermann\Schlemil\Crespel: Owen Brannigan; Cochenille: Murray Dickie; Pittichinaccio: René Soames
1950: Thomas Beecham, Royal Philharmonic Orchestra, sung in German; CD: Walhall, Cat: WLCD0022
Hoffmann: Rudolf Schock; Olympia: Rita Streich; Giulietta: Anny Schlemm; Antonia: Maria Reith	Coppélius, Dapertutto, Miracle, Lindorf: Josef Metternich; Nicklausse: Anneliese Müller
1955: Pierre Monteux, Metropolitan Opera & Chorus; CD: Sony Met Matinées, Cat: 88697961902
Hoffmann: Richard Tucker; Olympia: Roberta Peters; Giulietta: Risë Stevens; Antonia: Lucine Amara	Coppélius, Dapertutto, Miracle, Lindorf: Martial Singher; Nicklausse: Mildred Miller; Andres\Cochenille\Pitichinaccio\Frantz: Alessio De Paolis
1956: Rudolf Moralt, Bavarian Radio, sung in German; CD: Walhall, Cat: WLCD0196
Hoffmann: Waldemar Kmentt; Olympia: Rita Streich; Giulietta: Anny Schlemm; Antonia: Teresa Stich-Randall	Coppélius, Dapertutto, Miracle, Lindorf: George London; Nicklausse: Gisa Nerz
1958: Pierre-Michel Le Conte, Chorus and orchestra of the Concerts de Paris; LP: Concert Hall Record Club, Cat: BM2108
Hoffmann: Léopold Simoneau; Olympia, Antonia: Mattiwilda Dobbs; Giulietta: Uta Graf	Coppélius, Dapertutto, Lindorf, Miracle: Heinz Rehfuss; Nicklausse: Nata Tuescher; Andres\Cochenille\Pitichinaccio\Frantz: Aimé Doniat
1964–65: André Cluytens, Paris Conservatoire Orchestra, Rene Duclos Choir; EMI, Cat: 5 67983-2
Hoffmann: Nicolai Gedda; Olympia: Gianna D'Angelo; Giulietta: Elisabeth Schwarzkopf; Antonia: Victoria de los Ángeles	Coppélius, Miracle: George London; Dapertutto: Ernest Blanc; Lindorf: Nicola Ghiuselev; Nicklausse: Jean-Christophe Benoît; Andres\Cochenille\Pitichinaccio\Frantz: Jacques Loreau
1971: Serge Baudo, Metropolitan Opera Orchestra & Chorus (recorded live, 10 April); streaming audio: Met Opera on Demand
Hoffmann: Nicolai Gedda; Olympia: Colette Boky; Giulietta: Régine Crespin; Antonia: Lucine Amara; Stella: Pauline Andrey; Lindorf, Coppélius, Dapertutto, Miracle: Gabriel Bacquier; Niklausse: Frederica von Stade	Andrès, Frantz, Pittichinaccio, Cochenille: Andrea Velis; Luther: Richard Best; Nathanael: Leo Goeke; Hermann: Gene Boucher; Schlemil: Clifford Harvuot; Crespel: Paul Plishka; Antonia's mother: Batvah Godfrey Ben-David
1971: Richard Bonynge, Orchestre de la Suisse Romande, Du Brassus Chorus, Lausanne Pro Arte Chorus, Radio Suisse Romande Chorus; Decca, Cat: 417 363-2
Hoffmann: Plácido Domingo; Stella, Olympia, Giulietta, Antonia: Joan Sutherland; Coppélius, Dapertutto, Lindorf, Miracle: Gabriel Bacquier	Nicklausse, the Muse: Huguette Tourangeau; Andres, Frantz, Pittichinaccio, Cochenille: Hugues Cuénod
1972: Julius Rudel, John Alldis Choir, London Symphony Orchestra; CD: Westminster, Cat: 477 247
Hoffmann: Stuart Burrows; Stella, Olympia, Giulietta, Antonia: Beverly Sills	Coppélius, Dapertutto, Lindorf, Miracle: Norman Treigle; Nicklausse\The Muse: Susanne Marsee; Andres\Cochenille\Pitichinaccio\Frantz: Nico Castel
1974: Jean Périsson, Opéra National de Paris orchestra and chorus; Open reel tape: mr. tape, Cat: 1996
Hoffmann: Kenneth Riegel; Olympia: Danièle Chlostawa; Giulietta: Suzanne Sarroca; Antonia: Christiane Eda-Pierre	Coppélius, Dapertutto: José van Dam; Lindorf: Marc Vento; Miracle: Michel Philippe
1986: Seiji Ozawa, Radio France Chorus, Orchestre National de France; Deutsche Grammophon, Cat: 427 682-2
Hoffmann: Plácido Domingo; Olympia, Giulietta, Antonia: Edita Gruberová; Coppélius: Gabriel Bacquier; Dapertutto: Justino Díaz	Lindorf: Andreas Schmidt; Miracle: James Morris; Nicklausse: Claudia Eder; Frantz: Michel Sénéchal
1987-88: Jeffrey Tate, Leipzig Radio Chorus, Sächsische Staatskapelle Dresden; CD: Philips Cat: 422 374-2
Hoffmann: Francisco Araiza; Olympia: Eva Lind; Giulietta: Cheryl Studer; Antonia: Jessye Norman; Antonia's mother: Felicity Palmer	Coppélius, Miracle, Dapertutto, Lindorf: Samuel Ramey; The Muse\Nicklausse: Anne Sofie von Otter; Andrès\Cochenille\Frantz\Pittichinaccio: George Gautier; Nathanael: Peter Menzel; Hermann: Jurgen Hartfiel
1988: Sylvain Cambreling, Brussels Opéra National du Théâtre Royal de la Monnaie; EMI, Cat: 358613-2
Hoffmann: Neil Shicoff; Olympia: Luciana Serra; Giulietta: Jessye Norman; Antonia: Rosalind Plowright	Coppélius, Dapertutto, Lindorf, Miracle: José van Dam; Nicklausse/Muse: Ann Murray; Andrès\Cochenille\Frantz\Pittichinaccio: Robert Tear
1994-96: Kent Nagano, Chorus and Orchestra of the Opéra National de Lyon; Erato, Cat: 0630-14330-2
Hoffmann: Roberto Alagna; Stella: Juanita Lascarro; Olympia: Natalie Dessay; Giulietta: Sumi Jo; Antonia: Leontina Vaduva	Coppélius, Dapertutto, Lindorf, Miracle: José van Dam; Nicklausse\The Muse: Catherine Dubosc; Andrès\Cochenille\Frantz\Pittichinaccio: Gilles Ragon; Spallanzani: Michel Sénéchal; Crespel: Gabriel Bacquier

== Video recordings ==
1981: Georges Prêtre, Royal Opera House orchestra and chorus; DVD: Warner Music, Cat: 06301 93922
Hoffmann: Plácido Domingo; Olympia: Luciana Serra; Giulietta: Agnes Baltsa; Antonia: Ileana Cotrubaș; Stella: Deanne Bergsma	Coppélius: Geraint Evans; Dapertutto: Siegmund Nimsgern; Lindorf: Robert Lloyd; Miracle: Nicolai Ghiuselev; Muse, Nicklausse: Claire Powell
1988: Charles Dutoit, Metropolitan Opera Orchestra & Chorus (Production: Otto Schenk, recorded live, 8 January); streaming video: Met Opera on Demand
Hoffmann: Neil Shicoff; Olympia: Gwendolyn Bradley; Giulietta: Tatiana Troyanos; Antonia: Roberta Alexander; Stella: Pauline Andrey; Lindorf, Coppélius, Dapertutto, Miracle: James Morris; Nicklausse, Muse: Susan Quittmeyer; Andrès, Cochenille, Pitichinaccio, Frantz: Anthony Laciura	Luther: Spiro Malas; Nathanaël: Mark Baker; Hermann: David Bernard; Spalanzani: Andrea Velis; Schlémil: Morley Meredith; Crespel: John Macurdy; Antonia's mother: Gweneth Bean
1988: Alain Guingal, Orchestra and Chorus of Teatro Regio, Parma (Stage director: Beppe De Tomasi; recorded live, 17 February); DVD: Hardy, Cat: HCD4012
Hoffmann: Alfredo Kraus; Olympia: Ruth Welting; Giulietta: Jolanta Omilian; Antonia: Barbara Hendricks	Coppélius, Dapertutto, Lindorf, Miracle: Nicola Ghiuselev; Nicklausse: Elena Zilio; Andrès, Cochenille, Pitichinaccio, Frantz: Francis Egerton
2002: Jesús López-Cobos, Orchestra and Chorus of The Opéra National De Paris; DVD: Arthaus Musik, Cat: 107027
Hoffmann: Neil Shicoff; Olympia: Désirée Rancatore; Giulietta: Béatrice Uria-Monzon; Antonia: Ruth Ann Swenson	Coppélius, Miracle, Dapertutto, Lindorf: Bryn Terfel; Nicklausse, Muse: Susanne Mentzer; Andres, Cochenille, Frantz, Pitichinaccio: Michel Sénéchal
2009: Patrick Davin, Orchestre de la Suisse Romande, Choeur du Grand Théâtre de Genève; DVD: Bel Air Classiques, Cat: BAC049
Hoffmann: Marc Laho; Olympia: Patricia Petibon; Giulietta: Maria Riccarda Wesseling; Antonia: Rachel Harnisch	Coppélius, Miracle, Dapertutto, Lindorf: Nicolas Cavallier; Nicklausse, Muse: Stella Doufexis; Andres, Cochenille, Frantz, Pitichinaccio: Éric Huchet
2009: James Levine, Metropolitan Opera Orchestra, Chorus & Ballet (Production: Bartlett Sher; sets: Michael Yeargan; costumes: Catherine Zuber; recorded live, 19 December); HD video: Met Opera on Demand
Hoffmann: Joseph Calleja; Olympia: Kathleen Kim; Antonia, Stella: Anna Netrebko; Giulietta: Ekaterina Gubanova; Lindorf, Coppélius, Dapertutto, Miracle: Alan Held; Nicklausse, Muse: Kate Lindsey	Andrès, Cochenille, Pitichinaccio, Frantz: Alan Oke; Luther, Crespel: Dean Peterson; Nathanaël: Rodell Rosel; Spalanzani: Mark Schowalter; Hermann, Schlémil: Michael Todd Simpson; Antonia's mother: Wendy White
2014: Sylvain Cambreling, Teatro Real de Madrid Orchestra and Chorus (Stage director: Christoph Marthaler; recorded live, May); Blu-ray/DVD: Bel Air Classiques
Hoffmann: Eric Cutler; Muse, Nicklausse: Anne Sofie von Otter; Olympia: Ana Durlovski; Antonia, Giulietta: Measha Brueggergosman	Lindorf, Coppélius, Miracle, Dapertutto: Vito Priante; Andrès, Cochenille, Frantz, Pitichinaccio: Christoph Homberger; Stella: Altea Garrido; Luther, Crespel: Jean-Philippe Lafont
2015: Yves Abel, Metropolitan Opera Orchestra, Chorus & Ballet (Production: Bartlett Sher; sets: Michael Yeargan; costumes: Catherine Zuber; recorded live, 31 January); HD video: Met Opera on Demand
Hoffmann: Vittorio Grigolo; Olympia: Erin Morley; Antonia, Stella: Hibla Gerzmava; Giulietta: Christine Rice; Lindorf, Coppélius, Dapertutto, Miracle: Thomas Hampson; Nicklausse, Muse: Kate Lindsey	Andrès, Cochenille, Pitichinaccio, Frantz: Tony Stevenson; Luther, Crespel: David Pittsinger; Nathanaël, Spalanzani: Dennis Petersen; Hermann, Schlémil: David Crawford; Antonia's mother: Olesya Petrova
2016: Philippe Jordan, Paris Opera Orchestra & Chorus (Production: Robert Carsen, recorded live, Opéra Bastille); HD video: Paris Opera Play
Hoffmann: Ramón Vargas; Olympia: Nadine Koutcher; Giulietta: Kate Aldrich; Antonia: Ermonela Jaho; Muse, Nicklausse: Stéphanie d'Oustrac; Lindorf, Coppélius, Dapertutto, Miracle: Roberto Tagliavini; Antonia's mother: Doris Soffel	Spalanzani: Rodolphe Briand; Nathanaël: Cyrille Lovighi; Luther, Crespel: Paul Gay; Andres, Cochenille, Pitichinaccio, Frantz: Yann Beuron; Hermann: Laurent Laberdesque; Schlémil: François Lis
2016: Evelino Pidò, Royal Opera House Orchestra & Chorus (Stage director: John Schlesinger, recorded live, Royal Opera House); HD video: Royal Opera House Covent Garden Foundation
Hoffmann: Vittorio Grigolo; Lindorf, Coppélius, Dapertutto, Miracle: Thomas Hampson; Olympia: Sofia Fomina; Giulietta: Christine Rice; Antonia: Sonya Yoncheva; Nicklausse: Kate Lindsey; Spalanzani: Christophe Mortagne; Crespel: Eric Halfvarson	Andres, Cochenille, Pitichinaccio, Frantz: Vincent Ordonneau; Antonia's mother: Catherine Carby; Nathanaël: David Junghoon Kim; Hermann: Charles Rice; Schlémil: Yuriy Yurchuk; Luther: Jeremy White; Stella: Olga Sabadoch
2018: Carlo Rizzi, Dutch National Opera, Rotterdam Philharmonic Orchestra & Dutch National Opera Chorus (Stage director: Tobias Kratzer, recorded live, Het Muziektheater); HD video: C Major/Unitel
Hoffmann: John Osborn; Olympia: Nina Minasyan; Giulietta: Christine Rice; Antonia: Ermonela Jaho; Muse: Irene Roberts; Lindorf, Coppélius, Miracle, Dapertutto: Erwin Schrott	Spalanzani: Rodolphe Briand; Schlémil: François Lis; Luther, Crespel: Paul Gay; Antonia's mother: Eva Kroon; Andrès, Cochenille, Frantz, Pitichinaccio: Sunnyboy Dladla
2021: Kent Nagano, Hamburg State Opera Orchestra & Chorus (Stage director: Daniele Finzi Pasca, recorded live); HD video: EuroArts
Hoffmann: Benjamin Bernheim; Olympia, Antonia, Stella, Giulietta: Olga Peretyatko; Muse, Nicklausse: Angela Brower; Lindorf, Coppélius, Miracle, Dapertutto: Luca Pisaroni; Andrès, Cochenille, Frantz, Pitichinaccio: Gideon Poppe	Antonia's mother: Kristina Stanek; Luther, Crespel: Martin Summer; Nathanaël: Dongwon Kang; Spalanzani: Jürgen Sacher; Schlémil, Hermann: Bernhard Hansky
2024: Marc Minkowski, Salzburg Festival, Vienna Philharmonic Orchestra, Vienna State Opera Chorus (Stage director: Mariame Clément, recorded live, Großes Festspielhaus); HD video: Unitel
Hoffmann: Benjamin Bernheim; Stella, Olympia, Antonia, Giulietta: Kathryn Lewek; Lindorf, Coppélius, Miracle, Dapertutto: Christian Van Horn; Muse, Nicklausse: Kate Lindsey; Andrès, Cochenille, Frantz, Pitichinaccio: Marc Mauillon; Antonia's mother: Géraldine Chauvet	Spalanzani: Michael Laurenz; Crespel, Luther: Jérôme Varnier; Hermann, Schlémil: Philippe-Nicolas Martin; Nathanaël: Paco Garcia; Wilhelm: Yevheniy Kapitula
2024: Marco Armiliato, Metropolitan Opera Orchestra, Chorus & Ballet (Production: Bartlett Sher, recorded live, 5 October); HD video: Met Opera on Demand
Hoffmann: Benjamin Bernheim; Olympia: Erin Morley; Antonia, Stella: Pretty Yende; Giulietta: Clémentine Margaine; Lindorf, Coppélius, Miracle, Dapertutto: Christian Van Horn; Nicklausse, Muse: Vasilisa Berzhanskaya	Andrès, Cochenille, Frantz, Pitichinaccio: Aaron Blake; Nathanaël, Spalanzani: Tony Stevenson; Luther, Crespel: Bradley Garvin; Antonia's mother: Eve Gigliotti; Hermann, Schlémil: Jeongcheol Cha
2024: Antonello Manacorda, Royal Opera House Orchestra & Chorus (Stage director: Damiano Michieletto, recorded live, 28 November); HD video: Royal Ballet & Opera Stream
Hoffmann: Juan Diego Flórez; Lindorf, Coppélius, Miracle, Dapertutto: Alex Esposito; Olympia: Olga Pudova; Antonia: Ermonela Jaho; Giulietta: Marina Costa-Jackson; Nicklausse: Julie Boulianne; Muse, Antonia's mother: Christine Rice	Andrès, Cochenille, Frantz, Pitichinaccio: Christophe Mortagne; Stella, Wife, Nurse: María León; Luther: Jeremy White; Hermann, Schlémil: Grisha Martirosyan; Nathanaël: Ryan Vaughan Davies; Spalanzani: Vincent Ordonneau; Crespel: Alastair Miles
