= Arabella discography =

Recordings of the Richard Strauss opera

This is a list of recordings of Arabella, a three-act opera by Richard Strauss with a German-language libretto by Hugo von Hofmannsthal. It was first performed on 1 July 1933, at the Dresden Sächsisches Staatstheater. The music critic Richard Lawrence compared 10 audio and 3 video recordings in the December 2021 issue of Gramophone. He favored the 1957 Vienna audio recording with Lisa Della Casa in the title role (partly because it is uncut) and the 1977 Vienna film with Gundula Janowitz, both conducted by Georg Solti.

== Audio recordings ==
Year	Cast (Arabella, Zdenka, Mandryka)	Conductor, Opera house and orchestra	Label
1942	Viorica Ursuleac; Trude Eipperle; Hans Reinmar	Clemens Krauss; Salzburg Festival	CD: Opera Depot; Cat: OD 11496-2
1947	Maria Reining; Lisa della Casa; Hans Hotter	Karl Böhm; Vienna Philharmonic orchestra and chorus	CD: DG; Cat: 445 342-2
1953	Lisa della Casa; Elfride Trötschel; Hermann Uhde	Rudolf Kempe; Bavarian State Opera orchestra and chorus (recorded at Royal Opera House on 21 Sept)	CD: Testament; Cat: SBT2 1367
1955	Eleanor Steber; Hilde Güden; George London	Rudolf Kempe; Metropolitan Opera orchestra and chorus (recorded on 26 February; sung in English)	CD: Andromeda; Cat: ANDRCD 5013
1957	Lisa della Casa; Hilde Güden; George London	Georg Solti; Vienna Philharmonic orchestra and chorus	CD: Decca; Cat: 478 1400
1958	Lisa della Casa; Anneliese Rothenberger; Dietrich Fischer-Dieskau	Joseph Keilberth; Vienna Philharmonic orchestra and chorus	CD: Orfeo; Cat: C651053D
1963	Lisa della Casa; Anneliese Rothenberger; Dietrich Fischer-Dieskau	Joseph Keilberth; Bavarian State Opera orchestra and chorus	CD: DG; Cat: 477 5625
1977	Julia Varady; Edith Mathis; Dietrich Fischer-Dieskau	Wolfgang Sawallisch; Bavarian State Opera orchestra and chorus	CD: Golden Melodram; Cat: 3.0046-2
1981	Julia Varady; Helen Donath; Dietrich Fischer-Dieskau	Wolfgang Sawallisch; Bavarian State Opera orchestra and chorus	CD: Orfeo; Cat: C169882H
1986	Kiri te Kanawa; Gabriele Fontana; Franz Grundheber	Jeffrey Tate; Royal Opera House orchestra and chorus	CD: Decca; Cat: 417 623-2
2015	Jacquelyn Wagner; Agneta Eichenholz, James Rutherford	Marc Albrecht; Netherlands Philharmonic Orchestra	CD: Challenge Classics; Cat: 72686

== Video recordings ==
Year	Cast (Arabella, Zdenka, Adelaide, Fiakermilli, Matteo, Mandryka, Count Waldner)	Conductor, Opera house and orchestra (Production details)	Label
1977	Gundula Janowitz, Sona Ghazarian, Margarita Lilowa, Edita Gruberova, René Kollo, Bernd Weikl, Hans Kraemmer	Georg Solti, Vienna Philharmonic Orchestra & Vienna State Opera Chorus (Director: Otto Schenk, lip-synched film of 1977 Vienna production)	DVD: Decca/Unitel; Cat: B0011WMWX4
1984	Ashley Putnam, Gianna Rolandi, Regina Sarfaty, Gwendolyn Bradley, Keith Lewis, John Bröcheler, Artur Korn	Bernard Haitink, Glyndebourne Festival Opera, London Philharmonic Orchestra, Glyndebourne Chorus (Staging: John Cox; recorded live, 22 August, Glyndebourne)	DVD: Warner Music Vision; Cat: 0630-16912-2
1994	Kiri te Kanawa, Marie McLaughlin, Helga Dernesch, Natalie Dessay, David Kuebler, Wolfgang Brendel, Donald McIntyre	Christian Thielemann, Metropolitan Opera Orchestra & Chorus (Production: Otto Schenk; recorded live, 3 November 1994)	DVD: DGG; Cat: 073 005-9; Streaming video: Met Opera on Demand
2007	Renée Fleming, Julia Kleiter, Cornelia Kallisch, Sen Guo, Johan Weigel, Morten Frank Larsen, Alfred Muff	Franz Welser-Möst, Zürich Opera House Orchestra & Chorus (Director: Götz Friedrich; recorded live, June 2007)	DVD: Decca; Cat: 074 3263; Cat: 11380
2012	Emily Magee, Genia Kühmeier, Zoryana Kushpler, Daniela Fally, Michael Schade, Tomasz Konieczny, Wolfgang Bankl	Franz Welser-Möst, Vienna State Opera Orchestra & Chorus (Stage director: Sven-Eric Bechtolf; recorded live, 6 & 9 May 2012)	Blu-ray/DVD: Electric Picture; Cat: EPC04BD/ EPC03DVD
2014	Renée Fleming, Hanna-Elisabeth Müller, Gabriela Beňačková, Daniela Fally, Daniel Behle, Thomas Hampson, Albert Dohmen	Christian Thielemann, Salzburg Easter Festival, Staatskapelle Dresden, Sächsischer Staatsopernchor (Stage director: Florentine Klepper; recorded live, April 2014, Großes Festspielhaus)	Full HD: Unitel Classica; Blu-ray: C Major
2023	Sara Jakubiak, Elena Tsallagova, Doris Soffel, Hye-Young Moon, Robert Watson, Russell Braun, Albert Pesendorfer	Donald Runnicles, Deutsche Oper Berlin Orchestra & Chorus (Stage director: Tobias Kratzer; recorded live, 18 & 23 March 2023)	Blu-ray/DVD: Naxos; Streaming video: medici.tv
2025	Rachel Willis-Sørensen, Louise Alder, Karen Cargill, Julie Roset, Pavol Breslik, Tomasz Konieczny, Brindley Sherratt	Nicholas Carter, Metropolitan Opera Orchestra & Chorus (Production: Otto Schenk; recorded live, 22 November 2025)	HD video: Met Opera on Demand
