= Horst Laubenthal =

German opera singer (born 1939)

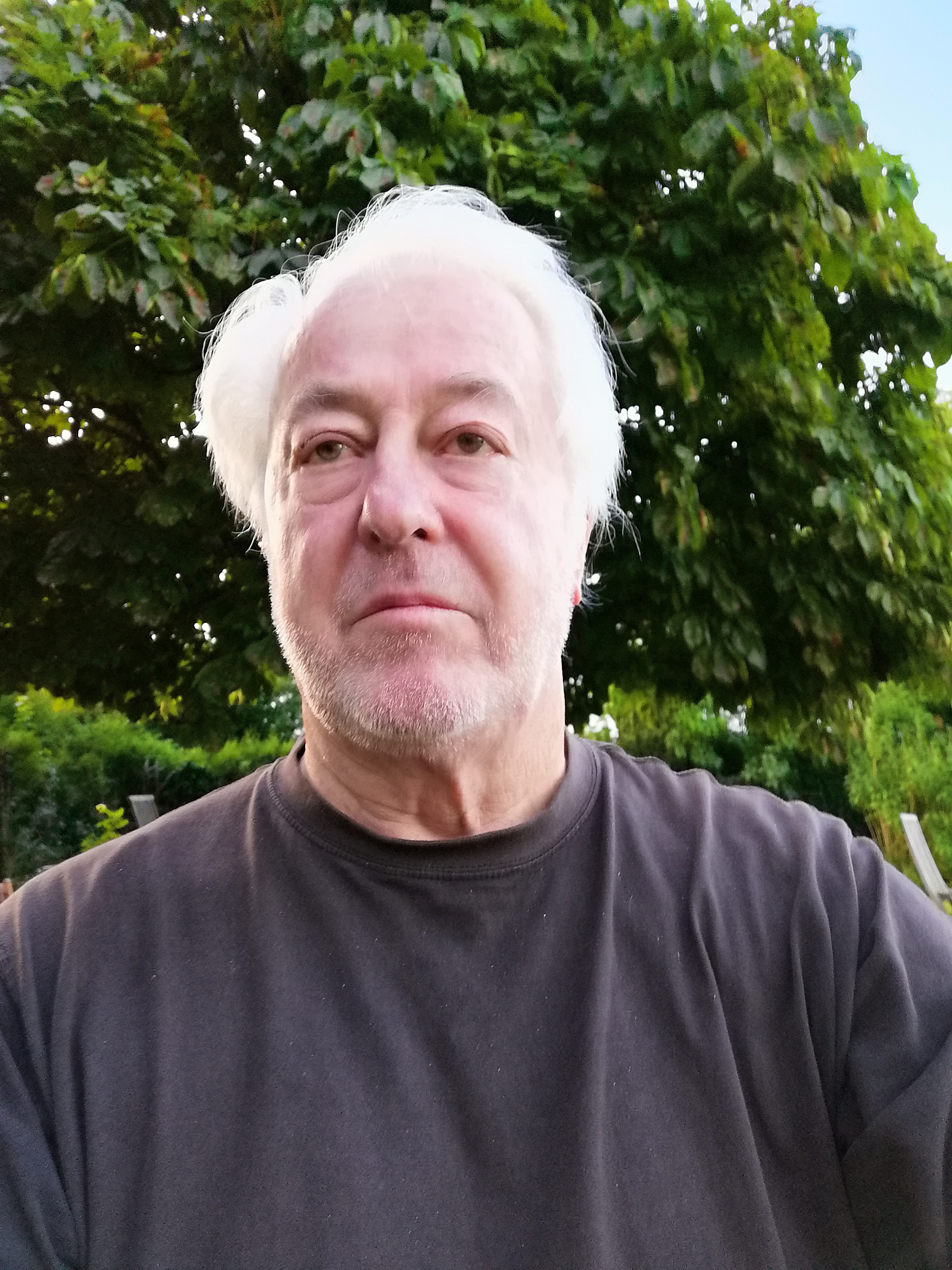
- Horst Laubenthal in 2019
- Born: Horst Neumaier; 8 March 1939 (age 87); Eisfeld, Thuringia, Germany
- Other names: Horst Neumann; Horst R. Laubenthal
- Education: Musikhochschule München
- Occupations: Operatic tenor; Academic voice teacher
- Organizations: Staatsoper Stuttgart; Theater Basel; Zürich Opera; Deutsche Oper Berlin; Hochschule für Musik Würzburg
- Spouse: Marga Schiml

Horst Laubenthal (born 8 March 1939), real name Horst Neumaier, (Note: Kutsch & Riemens (2012) give as birth name Horst Neumann. According to other sources, however, Horst Neumeier is the correct officially documented birth name.) is a German operatic tenor and academic voice teacher. He is known internationally, both as an opera singer, especially in Mozart roles such as Belmonte, Don Ottavio and Tamino, and as a concert and recital singer, with a focus on works by Johann Sebastian Bach. He has appeared at major opera houses and festivals, including the Glyndebourne Festival and the Salzburg Festival, and made many recordings, including rarely performed works such as Korngold's Violanta.

== Career ==
Horst Neumaier was born in Eisfeld, Thuringia. He studied voice at the Musikhochschule München from 1960 to 1965. His teacher was Kammersänger Rudolf Laubenthal, who adopted him.

Laubenthal made his debut in 1967 as Don Ottavio in Mozart's Don Giovanni at the Mozart Festival Würzburg. From 1967, he was a member of the ensemble at the Staatsoper Stuttgart, from 1969, at the Theater Basel, from 1970, at the Zürich Opera, and from 1973, he worked at the Deutsche Oper Berlin.

Laubenthal appeared at the Bayreuth Festival in 1970, as the steersman in Der fliegende Holländer and as Kunz Vogelgesang in Die Meistersinger von Nürnberg. He performed as a guest internationally, in 1972 as Belmonte in Mozart's Die Entführung aus dem Serail at the Glyndebourne Festival, in 1977 at the Paris Opera as Tamino in his Die Zauberflöte, in 1987 at the Teatro Regio in Turin as Ottavio, also at the Hamburg State Opera, Bavarian State Opera in Munich, and the Teatro Colón in Buenos Aires. At the Vienna State Opera, he performed major roles, besides his Mozart roles also David in Die Meistersinger, Lenski in Tchaikovsky's Eugene Onegin, Rinucchio in Puccini's Gianni Schicchi and the title role in Pfitzner's Palestrina. His roles also include the Prince in Rusalka and Wilhelm in Henze's Der junge Lord.

As a lieder and concert singer, he is known especially as a Bach singer. He recorded Bach's Mass in B minor, and the tenor arias in his St John Passion and St Matthew Passion with Karl Richter. He appeared at the Salzburg Festival in church concerts from 1973 to 1978, such as Mozart's Great Mass in C minor. Until 2004, he was a professor of voice at the Hochschule für Musik Würzburg. He is married to the mezzo-soprano Marga Schiml.

== Recordings ==
Laubenthal recorded rarely played operas, such as Der Barbier von Bagdad by Peter Cornelius, singing Nurredin alongside Helen Donath and Hans Sotin, conducted by Ferdinand Leitner in 1974. A reviewer noted: "He has a mellifluous lyric tenor, ideally suited to Mozart and the lyric German tenor roles. He is also a vivid actor." In a 1980 recording of Korngold's Violanta, he sang the role of Giovanni Bracca alongside Éva Marton in the title role and Siegfried Jerusalem as Alfonso, conducted by Marek Janowski.

Recordings with Laubenthal are held by the German National Library, including:

- Beethoven: Fidelio, with José van Dam, Siegfried Rudolf Frese, Helen Donath, Helga Dernesch, Horst Laubenthal, Jon Vickers, Werner Hollweg, conductor Herbert von Karajan, Berlin Philharmonic, recorded in Berlin 1970
- Franz Schubert: Duette, Terzette, Quartette, with Elly Ameling, Janet Baker, Peter Schreier, Horst Laubenthal, RIAS Kammerchor, Brilliant Classics 2010
- Berlioz: Les Troyens, Guy Chauvet, Wolfgang Schöne, Peter Wimberger, Nicola Ghiuselev, Horst Laubenthal (Iopas), N/A, Sona Ghazarian, Helga Dernesch, Christa Ludwig, Margarita Lilowa, Vienna State Opera orchestra and chorus, conductor Gerd Albrecht, CD: Gala, Cat: GL 100.609
