= Gilbert Py =

French singer (1933–2021)

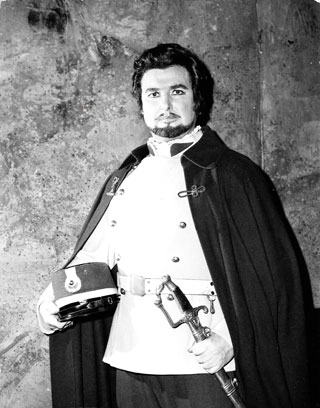
Py in 1974

Gilbert Py (9 December 1933 – 9 October 2021) was a French tenor. The power of his voice ranks him among the heroic tenors, the fullest and most powerful of the tenors (Samson), also called tenore robusto (Verdi's Otello) and whose German equivalent is the Wagnerian (Tristan, Siegfried) Heldentenor. It is characterized by fullness, roundness and equal timbre, even in the treble.

== Biography: the saltimbanque at the Opera ==
Py was born on 9 December 1933 in Sète in the department of Hérault. He spent his youth in a caravan on the fairgrounds with his family. They lived in Montpellier for a rather short stay, while continuing to travel, because the fairground profession made them live. Gilbert was five years old when he took his first piano lesson. His parents having no money, he didn't have an instrument to work with. He made his exercises on an accordion. The following year he began violin lessons. Mr. Anzi Batal, concertist exiled in France, offered him his first violin.

His mother enrolled him in a dance class. He took his first lesson in Montpellier when he was eight years old. With the ballet corps, he danced in Die Fledermaus and the Polovtsian Dances from Prince Igor. He asked the ballet mistress to regulate the dances of gypsy, Russian and Spanish styles. Together, they prepared extracts from Brahms' Hungarian Danses, and l’Arlésienne. She taught him how to use castanets.

== The lyrical career ==
=== Debuts ===
He entered the Cannes contest (which was previously won by tenors Tony Poncet, Alain Vanzo, Guy Chauvet, Gustave Botiaux. The winner was given the chance to sing a great role, Miss Janine Arcangoli, First Prize, chose Butterfly. Master Fichefet, organizer of the competition, confided Pinkerton to young tenor Gilbert Py who had won only a second prize. The concert took place on La Croisette.

He made his debut on 14 November 1964 at Verviers (Belgium), as Pinkerton in Madame Butterfly, with Janine Arcangioli (once she married him, she gave up her own career to devote herself exclusively to her husband's one).

On 14 March 1965, he sang his first grand role: Mario Cavaradossi in Tosca at Tourcoing.

His career began on that day. He sang John the Baptist in Herodiade at Tourcoing and in Carmen in Rennes. Aida at Liège (Belgium), the same season, Otello at Tourcoing, in 1966, Samson in Ghent (Belgium) with Rita Gorr as Delilah… Otello, Radamés, Fidelio, Samson, Don José, Mathis der Mahler, Nemrod in la Tour de Babel, on the occasion of the reopening of the Opéra Royal de Wallonie in Liège (Belgium), in 1966.

Fidelio at Bordeaux in 1968, Adoniram in La reine de Saba at Toulouse in 1969, debut at Nice, with Turridu, and Canio in Pagliacci, then on the same year at the Théâtre de verdure de Cimiez: Samson, with Rita Gorr, Ernest Blanc. René Nicoli administrator of the Paris Opera and Jean Giraudeau director of the Opéra Comique, present at the show, decided that evening, to bring him into the troupe of the Opera Raskolnikoff of Sutermeister in Nice, in December 1969. On 16 January 1970, the audience in Nice discovered "an Otello who swept all at once, all those who since Luccioni had approached the role, including the famous Del Monaco I".

=== Debut in Paris ===
In 1969, he made his debut at the Paris Opera, with Carmen, Berlioz's La Damnation de Faust, production Maurice Béjart, then Mario Caravadossi with Hana Janků. Role of Manrico in Il trovatore on 13 June 1973.

At the Opéra Comique: Werther, Hoffmann, Pagliacci, Tosca. The arrival of Rolf Liebermann as Administrator of the Opera was followed by the closure of the Opéra Comique and the dislocation of the troupe.

=== The United States and the World ===
Py made his debut in the United States with Berlioz's Damnation of Faust in Miami.

His career normally continued in France, Germany, Austria, Belgium and the world.

== Discography ==
| Work | Composer | Recording date | Cast | Orchestra | Conductor | Label | Origin | Format | Catalogue numbers with capitals |
|---|---|---|---|---|---|---|---|---|---|
| Carmen | Bizet | 1975 | Régine Crespin, Gilbert Py, José Van Dam, Jeannette Pilou. | Phil. de Strasbourg | Alain Lombard | Erato Records | Studio | 3 × 33 rpm | 45573 2 |
| La reine de Saba | Gounod | 20 March 1969 | Suzanne Sarroca, Gilbert Py, Gérard Serkoyan | Capitole de Toulouse | Michel Plasson | BJR | Live | 2 × 33 rpm | BJR-123(2) |
| La vestale | Spontini | 1974 | Gundula Janowitz, Gilbert Py, Ruza Baldini, Gian Paolo Corradi | RAI Roma | Jesús López-Cobos | MRF | Live | Coffret 3x33rpm | MRF-124S |
| Sacred songs at Notre-Dame de Paris | Various | 1984 | Gilbert Py, Claudine Granger | Organs of ND de Paris | Jacques Marichal | ZETA ADES | Live | CD | ? |
| Hérodiade/Salomé (extracts French version) | Massenet/ Richard Strauss | 1987/1989 | Grace Bumbry, Leona Mitchell, Gilbert Py/ Cynthia Makris, Nadine Denize | Phil. Nice/ Phil. Strasbourg | Georges Prêtre/ Theodor Guschlbauer | Gala | Live | 3 CD | GL 100.631 |
