= Jolanta Omilian =

Polish opera singer

- Born: Jolanta Omiljanowicz-Quattrini; 1953 (age 72–73)
- Occupation: Opera singer (soprano)

Jolanta Omilian, real name: Jolanta Omiljanowicz-Quattrini (born 1953) is a Polish opera singer, singing mainly belcanto and dramatic soprano parts.

== Education ==
Jolanta Omilian is a graduate of Fryderyk Chopin University of Music in Warsaw. She won 1st Prize in the International Vocal Competition in Belgrade in 1975. After moving to Italy, she perfected her vocal technique in Milan with Prof. Rodolfo Celletti, mainly on Italian belcanto repertoire.

== Operatic career ==
She debuted as Violetta in Verdi's La Traviata in Grand Theater in Warsaw. Her international debut took place in La Fenice, also as Traviata (with Maestro Bruno Bartoletti conducting and Giancarlo Menotti's stage directions. She also sang Rosina in Rossini's Il barbiere di Siviglia, Fiorilla in Rossini's Il Turco in Italia and Lina in Verdi's Stiffelio.

She sang in Italian theatres and festivals such as La Scala, Opera di Roma, Arena di Verona, Teatro di San Carlo in Naples, Teatro Regio in Torino, Teatro Regio in Parma, Teatro Comunale in Genova, Teatro Massimo in Palermo, Teatro Filarmonico in Verona and many international stages in Austria and Germany (Vienna State Opera, Bavarian State Opera in Munich). Spain and Portugal (Liceu in Barcelona, Las Palmas Opera, Santa Cruz de Tenerife, Bilbao, Santander, Lisboa); France (opera houses in Limoges, Rouen, Montpellier and Marseille); Switzerland (Basel, Zurich, St. Gallen), Japan, Korea (Opera Tokyo, Daegu Opera House); United States (Opera Houston, Opera Dallas, Opera Palm Beach, Art Center Philadelphia), South America (Opera Rio de Janeiro, Opera di Santo Domingo) and many others.

She took part in opera music festivals: Festival Arena di Verona Sferisterio Macerata, Martina Franca, Benevento, Malatesta Fano, RAI Roma, Paris Musique, Festival Budapest, Schwetzingen Festival, Menotti Festival dei Due Mondi: Spoleto-Charleston, Festival Internazionale Musica Sacra Virgo Lauretana.

She has in her repertoire 60 major operatic main soprano parts, a. o. Bellini's Norma and La Straniera, Donizetti's Tudor Queens – Maria Stuarda, Anna Bolena, Roberto Devereux (Elisabeth I), Parisina, many Verdi's parts: Traviata, Aida, Attila (Odabella), Il Trovatore (Leonora), Macbeth (Lady Macbeth), Falstaff (Alice), Rigoletto (Gilda), Simon Boccanegra (Amelia), Ballo in maschera (Amelia), Stiffelio, Luisa Miller, Nabucco (Abigaille). She created Rossinian repertoires: Il barbiere di Siviglia, Semiramide, La gazza ladra, TancrediIl turco in Italia. She sang two Medeas: in the operas by Pacini and Cherubini.

She sang with, a. o: with: Alfredo Kraus, Piero Cappuccilli, Marilyn Horne. Cesare Siepi, Rolando Panerai, Leo Nucci, Renato Bruson, Giorgio Zancanaro, Flaviano Labo, Barbara Hendricks, Eva Marton, Enzo Dara, Samuel Ramey, Luigi Alva, Rockwell Blake, Ernesto Palacio, Nicola Martinucci, Gianfranco Cecchele, Giuseppe Giacomini, Nicolo Ghiuselev, Bonaldo Giaiotti.

Antonio Braga dedicated especially for her the part of Queen Anacaona in his opera 1492 Epopea lirica d’America.

== Prizes ==
During her studies in Warsaw, she gained 1st Prize in the International Vocal Competition in Belgrade in 1975.

She was awarded by the Italian Society for International Organizations (1995).

== Discography ==
Studio and live recordings

Opera:

- A. Braga, 1492 Epopea lirica d’America (Anacaona) – Bongiovanni, BON 5036
- V. Bellini, La Straniera (Alaide), Teatro Comunale di Treviso – House of Opera
- V. Bellini, Norma (Norma), Opera Municipal Rio de Janeiro, Teatro Como – House of Opera
- G. Bizet, Pecheurs de perles (Leila), Dallas – House of Opera
- G. Donizetti, Lucia di Lammermoor, Opera di Santa Cruz de Tenerife – House of Opera
- G. Donizetti, Parisina (Parisina), Opernhaus Basel – House of Opera
- G. Donizetti, Roberto Devereux (Elisabetta I), Festival Martina Franca/Opera di Roma – House of Opera
- S. Mercadante, Il Giuramento (Elaisa), Festival Martina Franca, Teatro Petruzzelli Bari – Fonit Cetra
- J. Offenbach, Les Contes d’Hoffmann (Giulietta), Teatro Regio di Parma – Hardy Classic, HARDY 4012 DVD
- G. Pacini, Medea, Opera Festival di Savona – Arkadia, Bongiovanni
- G. Pergolesi, Adriano in Siria (Principe Farnaspe), RAI Napoli – Bongiovanni, BON 2078 80
- G. Rossini, Il Barbiere di Siviglia (Rosina), Teatro Regio Parma – House of Opera
- G. Rossini, Semiramide (Semiramide), Teatro San Carlo Napoli – House of Opera
- G. Rossini, Turco in Italia (Fiorilla), Teatro La Fenice – House of Opera
- T. Traetta, Iphigenia in Tauride (Ifigenia), Festival Martina Franca – House of Opera
- G. Verdi, Attila (Odabella), Festival Martina Franca, Teatro San Carlo Napoli – House of Opera
- G. Verdi, Nabucco (Abigaille), Arena di Verona – House of Opera
- G. Verdi, Simon Boccanegra (Amelia), Opera di Roma – House of Opera
- G. Verdi, Traviata (Violetta), La Fenice di Venezia, Santa Cruz de Tenerife – House of Opera

Oratorios:

- J. Mysliveček, Abramo ed Isacco (Angelo) Festival Schwetzingen-Monachium – Teldec Telefunken Decca
- P. Raimondi, Giudizio universale, BON 2438

Recital:

- Recital Arie di Bellini, Bongiovanni

== Sources ==
- Jolanta Omilian's discography: CLOR : Indexed Electronic Catalogue (IEC)
- Jolanta Omilian in archives of Teatro La Fenice
- Musiałam iść w stronę belcanta. Interview with Jolantą Omilian, on Portal Maestro
