= Charles Luce-Varlet =

French composer and violinist

Charles Luce-Varlet (born Douai 1 December 1781 – 1853) was a French composer and violinist. His noted compositions include a violin concerto, and L'élève de Presbourg, a comic opera on the youth of Haydn.

== Selected recordings ==
- aria from L'élève de Presbourg : "De ses illusions… Viens, ô mélodie" (Haydn). Cyrille Dubois Orchestre National de Lille Pierre Dumoussaud Alpha 2023
