= Suzanne Sarroca =

French singer (1927–2023)

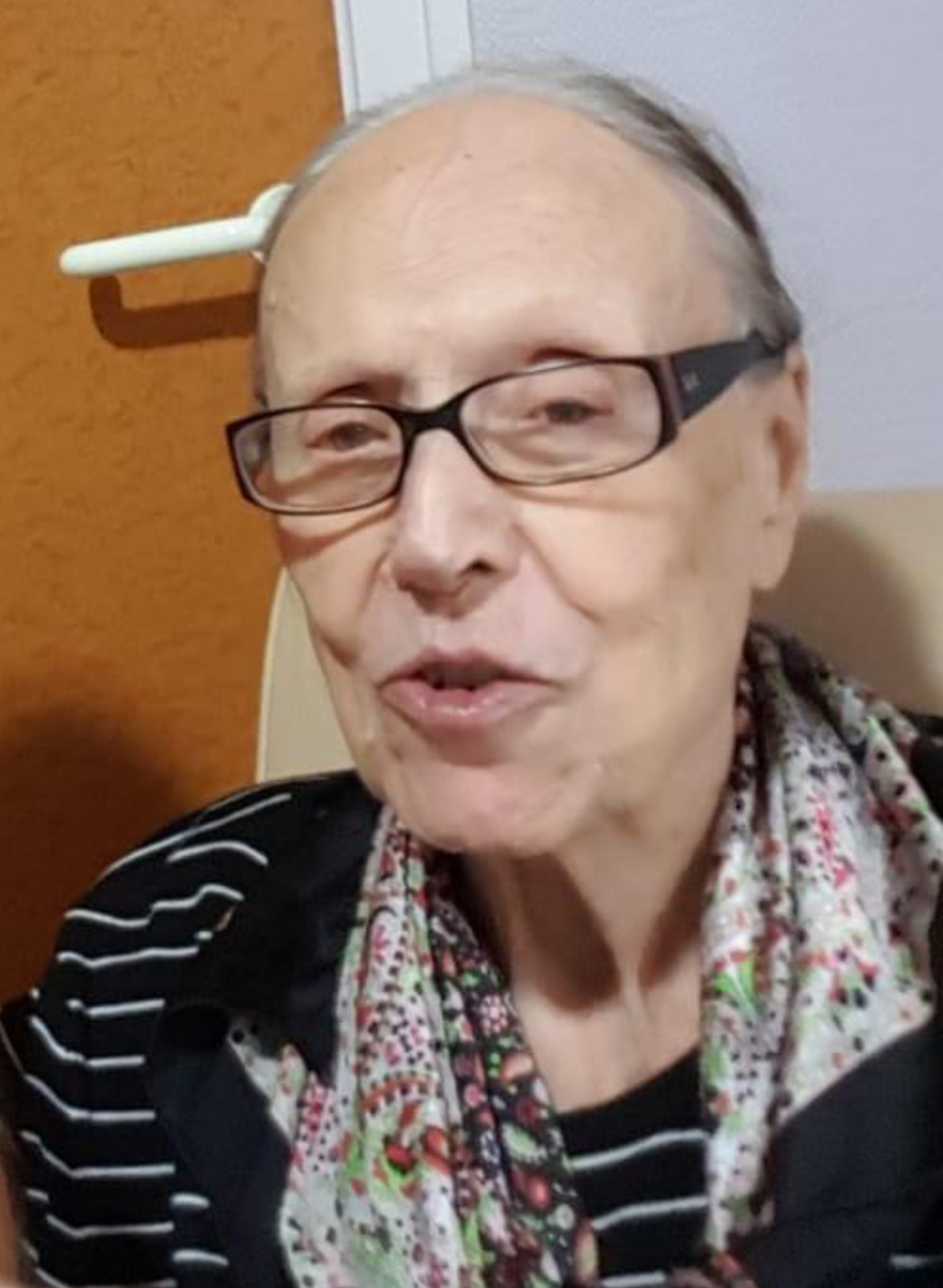
- Born: 21 April 1927; Carcassonne, France
- Died: 15 September 2023 (aged 96)
- Occupation: Operatic soprano

Suzanne Sarroca (21 April 1927 – 15 September 2023) was a 20th-century French operatic soprano.

== Biography ==
Born in Carcassonne, Sarroca studied singing at the Conservatoire de Toulouse (1946–1948). She began her career as a mezzo-soprano in the role of Charlotte in Massenet's Werther in Carcassonne, a role she revived the same year at the Capitole de Toulouse. In 1951, she sang Bizet's Carmen at la Monnaie of Brussels.

Sarroca then addressed the great roles of lyrico-dramatic soprano: in 1952, she made a remarkable debut at the Paris Opera where she sang at both the Opéra Garnier and the Opéra-Comique:

- Rezia in Weber's Oberon
- Senta in Wagner's The Flying Dutchman
- Santuzza in Mascagni's Cavalleria rusticana
- the title role of Verdi's Aida
- Musetta in Puccini's La Bohème
- Elisabeth in Verdi's Don Carlos.

Sarroca created Henry Barraud's Numance, interpreted the title role of Charpentier's Louise, Blanche de la Force in Poulenc's Le Dialogue des Carmélites, Tatiana in Tchaikovsky's Eugene Onegin, and also Octavian in Strauss's Rosenkavalier alongside Régine Crespin or Elisabeth Schwarzkopf.

For more than thirty years, she was active in the major theatres of the provinces: Toulouse, Strasbourg, Marseille (Donna Anna in Don Giovanni, 1956), Bordeaux and Nice (Tosca with Franco Corelli in 1970).

Especially sought abroad for her embodiments of Puccini's Tosca, and Verdi's Aida and Elisabeth in Don Carlos, she triumphed in these roles in Buenos Aires, Brussels, Geneva, Rome, Rio, Naples, London (Covent Garden in 1958–1959 and 1964–1965).

Starting in the 1980s, she again took on certain mezzo roles, notably Mère Marie de l'Incarnation in Dialogues des Carmélites in Strasbourg in 1982.

Sarroca was the director of the Atelier lyrique of the Opéra national du Rhin (1983–1985) and teacher at the 9th arrondissement of Paris conservatory until 1992.

Sarroca also can be heard in excerpts form Cavalleria Rusticana (role of Santuzza) with Alain Vanzo, Giulietta in Offenbach's Tales of Hoffmann published at Adès. She also recorded Tosca in French with Gustave Botiaux and Adrien Legros. Another testimony of this role exists in LP at London with José Luccioni. Her interpretation of Balkis in Gounod's La Reine de Saba alongside Gilbert Py and Gérard Serkoyan (Toulouse, 1970) is available at Gala. In the volume devoted to the French song of the Encyclopedia on CD-ROM by Richters (available at imagemogul and houseofopera), she can be heard in her complete incarnations of Salome in Massenet's Hérodiade (1963) and Elisabeth in Don Carlos (1968 French version in 5 acts). Her interpretation of Rachel in Halévy's La Juive in a concert at Carnegie Hall with Richard Tucker and Norman Treigle in 1964 has been briefly available on CD and in large excerpts from Monna Vanna by Henry Fevrier.

Suzanne Sarroca later lived and taught in Paris. She died on 15 September 2023, at the age of 96.
