= San Domenico di Guzman (oratorio) =

San Domenico di Guzman is an oratorio for narrator, soloists, chorus, and orchestra composed by Antonio Braga who also wrote the libretto. Based on the life of Saint Dominic, the work premiered on 12 June 1997 at the Teatro San Carlo in Naples conducted by Carlos Piantini with Giorgio Albertazzi as the narrator. A live recording of the premiere performance was released in 1998 on the Bongiovanni label.
