= Sona Ghazarian =

Armenian-Austrian operatic soprano (born 1945)

Sona Ghazarian (born September 2, 1945) is a Lebanese-Austrian operatic soprano. A Kammersängerin of the Republic of Austria, she has sung over 70 roles in the major opera houses of both Europe and the United States.

== Biography ==
Sona Ghazarian was born in Beirut in 1945, where she studied psychology at the American University of Beirut and singing at the National Conservatory. After further study at the Accademia Musicale Chigiana in Siena and the Accademia di Santa Cecilia in Rome, she joined the Vienna State Opera in 1972 and sang there for many years where her roles have included Oscar in Un ballo in maschera and Violetta in La Traviata. She made her Salzburg Festival debut in 1973 as Barbarina in Le nozze di Figaro and subsequently sang there in 1975 as Blonde in Die Entführung aus dem Serail and in 1983 as Marzelline in Fidelio. Her Metropolitan Opera debut came in 1987 as Adina in L'elisir d'amore. She returned there in 1989 as Musetta in La bohème.

== Selected recordings ==
- Beethoven: Fidelio (Theo Adam, Hildegard Behrens, Sona Ghazarian, Peter Hofmann, Gwynne Howell et al.; Chicago Symphony Orchestra; Sir Georg Solti, conductor). Label: Decca (CD)
- Bellini: I Capuleti e i Montecchi (Sona Ghazarian, Ottavio Garaventa, Agnes Baltsa, Tugomir Franc, Kurt Rydl; Vienna State Opera Orchestra and Chorus; Giuseppe Patané, conductor). Live recording 10 August 1977. Label: Gala (CD)
- Strauss: Arabella (Gundula Janowitz, Sona Ghazarian, René Kollo, Edita Gruberova, Bernd Weikl; Vienna Philharmonic Orchestra; Sir Georg Solti, conductor). Label: Decca (DVD)
- Verdi: Un ballo in maschera (Montserrat Caballé, José Carreras, Patricia Payne, Sona Ghazarian, Ingvar Wixell et al.; Royal Opera House Orchestra and Chorus; Colin Davis, conductor). Label: Decca (CD)
- Berlioz: Les Troyens, Guy Chauvet, Wolfgang Schöne, Peter Wimberger, Nicola Ghiuselev, Horst Laubenthal (Iopas), N/A, Sona Ghazarian (Ascagne), Helga Dernesch, Christa Ludwig, Margarita Lilowa, Vienna State Opera orchestra and chorus, conductor Gerd Albrecht, CD: Gala, Cat: GL 100.609
