= Margarita Lilowa =

Austrian singer and opera singer (1935–2012)

Margarita Lilowa (26 July 1935 – 13 April 2012)) was a Bulgarian-Austrian opera singer (mezzo-soprano/alto).

== Life ==
Born in Cherven Bryag, (Bulgaria), Lilowa studied singing and choral conducting at the National Academy of Music in Sofia with Maria Zibulka and Michail Jankow. In 1959 she made her debut as Maddalena in Rigoletto at the opera of Varna. In 1962 she made a guest appearance in London, afterwards she was engaged by the Vienna State Opera and on 1 January 1963 made her debut as Amneris in Aida. She belonged to the Staatsoper-Ensemble until 1995 and sang 46 roles in 1135 performances, including Marcellina in The Marriage of Figaro 143 times and Annina in Der Rosenkavalier 115 times .

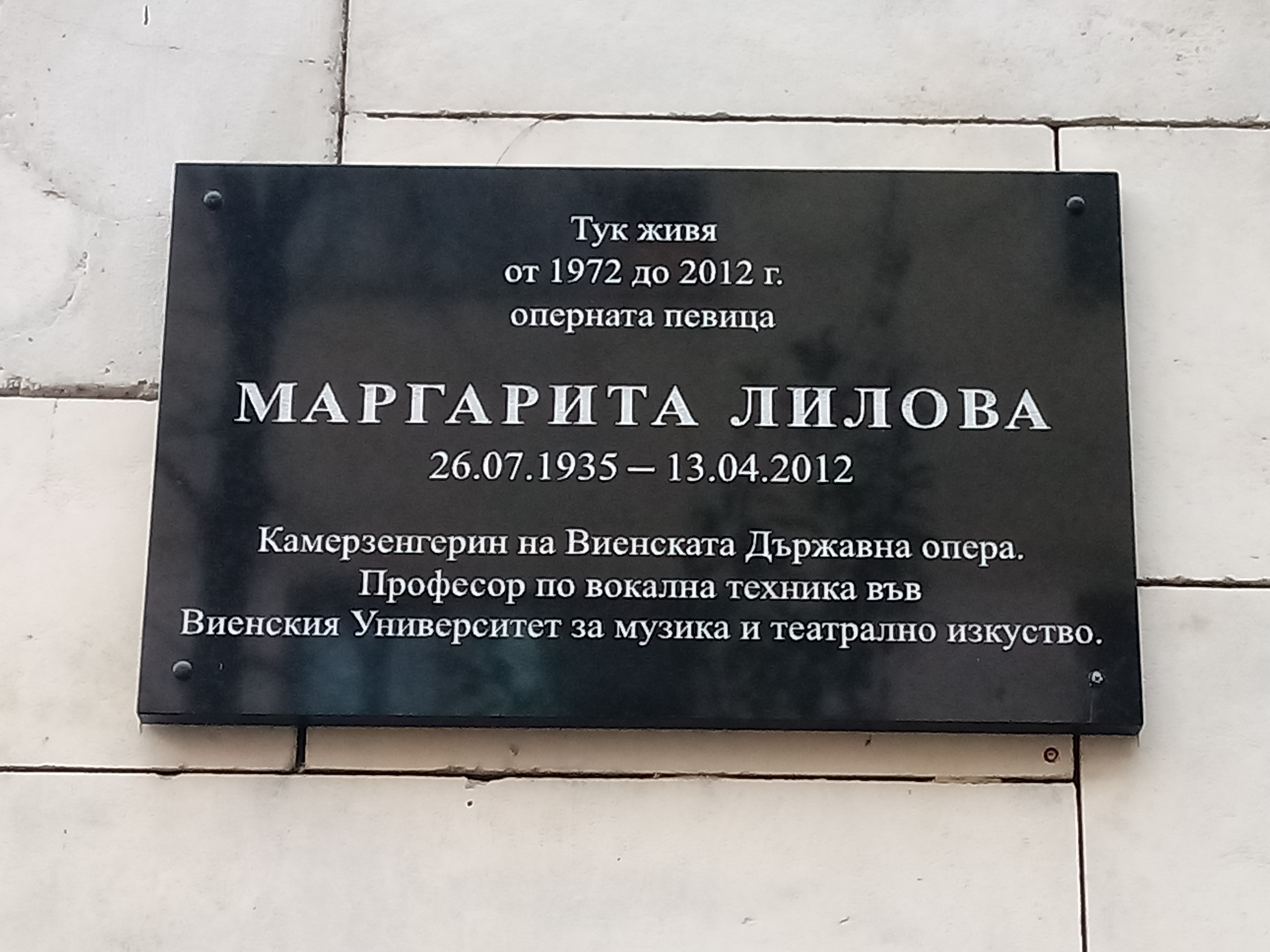
Memorial plaque for Lilowa in Sofia

Lilowa also sang for twelve years at the Komische Oper Berlin and eleven years at the San Francisco Opera in the USA. She appeared at the Salzburg Festival from 1965. In 1992 she started teaching at the University of Music and Performing Arts Vienna.

In 1969 she was awarded the Berliner Kritikerpreis and in 1984 she was appointed Kammersängerin.

Lilowa died in Vienna on 13 April 2012 at age 76.

== Selected recordings ==
- Berlioz: Les Troyens, Guy Chauvet, Wolfgang Schöne, Peter Wimberger, Nicola Ghiuselev, Horst Laubenthal (Iopas), N/A, Sona Ghazarian, Helga Dernesch, Christa Ludwig, Margarita Lilowa (Anna), Vienna State Opera orchestra and chorus, conductor Gerd Albrecht, CD: Gala, Cat: GL 100.609
