= Benjamin Bernheim =

French opera singer

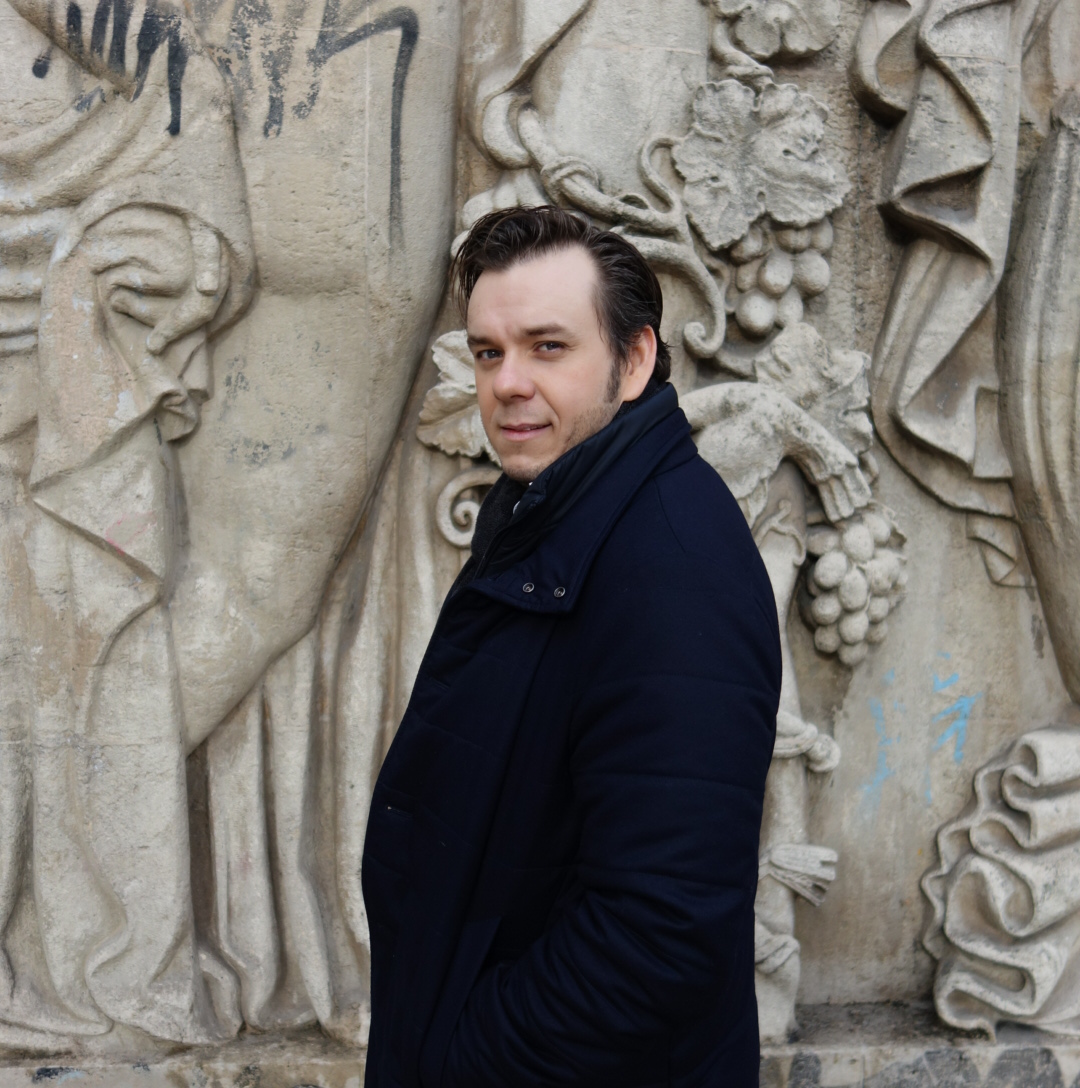
- Born: 9 June 1985 (age 41); Paris, France
- Education: Lausanne Conservatory
- Occupation: Opera singer (tenor)
- Years active: 2008–present
- Website: https://benjaminbernheim.com

Signature
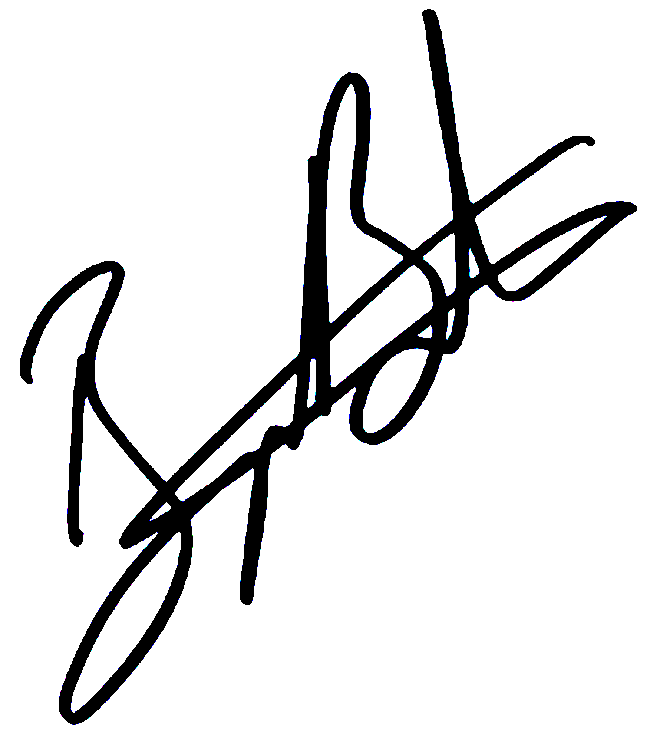

Benjamin Bernheim (9 June 1985) is a French-Swiss lyric tenor known for his interpretation of Italian and French roles.

== Education ==
Born in Paris, Benjamin Bernheim grew up in Geneva, where he studied violin and piano, before starting singing lessons at age 10 at the local conservatory. At age 18, he began his studies at the Lausanne Conservatory, under the tutelage of Gary Magby. Following the completion of his studies, he was accepted into the Opera Studio at Opernhaus Zürich for the 2008/2009 season.

== Career ==
Bernheim's repertoire currently includes: Rodolfo in La Bohème, Des Grieux (Manon), Alfredo in La traviata, title role in Faust, Nemorino in L'elisir d'amore, Verdi's Requiem, Puccini's Messa di Gloria, and Lenski in Eugene Onegin. He is now a frequent guest of the Opernhaus Zürich, the Royal Opera House in London, the Staatsoper Berlin, Deutsche Oper, the Semperoper Dresden, the Wiener Staatsoper, the Opéra national de Paris, the Théâtre des Champs-Élysées, Opera national de Bordeaux, Teatro alla Scala in Milan, and the Salzburg Whitsun Festival and Salzburg Festival.

Bernheim joined the Opernhaus Zürich troupe in 2010, where he was engaged to perform in myriad productions, including: Emmanuele in the world premiere of Marc-André Dalbavie's Gesualdo, directed by Patrice Caurier et Moshe Leiser.

In 2012, he made his Salzburg Festival debut as Agenore in Il re pastore by Mozart in the concert version of the opera, conducted by William Christie. Between 2012 and 2015 he added multiple roles to his repertoire, most notedly: Cassio (Otello), Narraboth (Salome), Tebaldo (I Capuleti e I Montechi), Matteo (Arabella), Tamino (Die Zauberflöte), Spakos (Cléopatre), and Eginhard (Fierrabras). He also made his debut at the Opéra national de Bordeaux, Semperoper Dresden and the Whitsun and Summer Festival in Salzburg.

The 2015/16 season marked a turning point in his career, as he began making his debut in leading tenor roles at opera houses throughout Europe and the United States. He performed as Rodolfo (La bohème) at Opernhaus Zürich, Erik (Der Fliegende Holländer) and Matteo (Arabella) at Semperoper Dresden, Cassio (Otello) at Salzburg Osterfestspiele, Tebaldo (I Capuleti e i Montecchi) at Opernhaus Zurich, Italian Singer (Der Rosenkavalier) at Teatro alla Scala, and as Roméo in Gounod's Roméo et Juliette at Dutch National Opera. He also performed at the Salzburger Festspiele (Pfingsten) Gala Concert.

Bernheim's international success continued to grow in the 2016/17 season. He returned to Opernhaus Zürich as Rodolfo in La bohème, and also performed there as Cassio in their production of Otello. Other roles included Edmondo (Manon Lescaut) and Nicias (Thaïs) at Salzburger Festspiele, Rodolfo (La bohème) at Semperoper Dresden, Lenski in Eugene Onegin at Deutsche Oper Berlin, Laërtes (Hamlet) at Opéra de Lausanne, and the title role of Faust at Latvian National Opera and Ballet. In addition to these performances, Bernheim performed with Orchestra dell'Accademia Teatro alla Scala and Philharmonie de Paris in 2017, and also performed a recital presented by L’instant Lyrique.

In the 2017/18 season, Bernheim championed the role of Rodolfo in La bohème, performing it in two productions at Royal Opera House London and once at Opéra national de Paris. He performed as Alfredo (La traviata) at Staatsoper Berlin and Opernhaus Zürich, and as the title role of Faust at Lyric Opera of Chicago and Théâtre des Champs-Elysées. In 2018, he made his role debuts of Nemorino in L'Elisir d'amore at Wiener Staatsoper, and Piquillo in La Périchole at Salzburger Festspiele, performed a recital at Opéra national de Bordeaux, and returned for a concert with Philharmonie de Paris.

Bernheim's 2018/2019 season began with La Boheme at the Zurich Opera House where he sang Rofolfo, a role he reprised at the Vienna State Opera. This was followed by Tamino in The Magic Flute directly afterwards. Other performances included La Traviata at the Royal Opera House in London, La Scala in Milan, the Opéra national de Paris, and Nemorino (L'Elisir d'amore) at Wiener Staatsoper. He also made his role debut as Des Grieux in Manon at the Opéra national de Bordeaux. His second role debut of the season was Ismaele in Verdi's Nabucco at the Zurich Opera House. In concert Bernheim performed Puccini's Messa di Gloria with the London Symphony Orchestra conducted by Sir Antonio Pappano and at the Wiener Staatsoper celebration commemorating 150 Years Vienna State Opera being on the Ring. Additionally, he performed a concert with soprano Ermonela Jaho at Opera Oviedo, as well as a recital presented by L’instant Lyrique.

In his 2019/20 season, he made his role debut as Il Duca di Mantova (Rigoletto) at the Bayerische Staatsoper, sang Rodolfo (La bohème) at the Staatsoper Berlin, Alfredo (La traviata) at the Staatsoper Berlin and Opéra national de Paris (new production), Des Grieux (Manon, new production) at the Opéra national de Paris and concerts at the Opéra national de Bordeaux, La Grange au Lac and Opernhaus Zürich, and a lied recital with Sabine Devieilhe and Carrie-Ann Matheson at Opernhaus Zürich.

Bernheim began his 2020/21 season as Alfredo (La traviata) at the Opéra national de Bordeaux. He performed at Salzburger Festspiele, opened Le Festival de Paris with a recital with Carrie-Ann Matheson, and Philharmonie Luxembourg (also a recital with Matheson). Bernheim performed the title role in Faust at the Opéra national de Paris in a new production which was broadcast on France TV5. He was scheduled to make his debut at the Metropolitan Opera in New York City as Roméo in Gounod's Roméo et Juliette, but the production was cancelled due to the Coronavirus pandemic.

In his 2021/22 season, Bernheim began with a role and house debut at the Staatsoper Hamburg in the opening production of their 2021/22 season, Les contes d’Hoffmann, in which he played the title role. He performed recitals at the Théâtre des Champs-Elysées and at the Wiener Konzerthaus. Bernheim then performed as the Duke in Verdi's Rigoletto, a house debut at Gran Teatre del Liceu in Barcelona, and made his role debut as Werther in a new production by Romain Gilbert at the Opéra national de Bordeaux.

In 2020 he was named "Artiste lyrique de l'année" at Les Victoires de la Musique Classique in France, among other awards (see Awards section). He began his season as Alfredo (La Traviata) at the Opéra national de Bordeaux.

Bernheim began his 2022/23 season with a house debut at Opéra national du Rhin, performing Verdi’s Requiem. He then reprises the role of Des Grieux in Manon at the Staatsoper Hamburg. In October, Bernheim made a return to the Wiener Staatsoper to perform the role of the Duke of Mantua in Verdi's Rigoletto. He continued performing this role at the Metropolitan Opera in November, marking his house debut. Bernheim entered into the New Year with his highly anticipated role debut as Roméo in Gounod's Roméo et Juliette in Switzerland. He then returned to the Wiener Staatsoper to perform Rodolfo in Franco Zeffirelli's production of La bohème alongside Rachel Willis-Sørensen.

To begin the 2023/24 season, Bernheim performed the role of Ruggero Lastouc in the new Christof Loy production of Puccini’s opera, La rondine, opposite Ermonela Jaho at the Opernhaus Zürich. He then gave a recital with pianist Carie-Ann Matheson at the Teatro alla Scala. Bernheim made a return to the Opéra Bastille to reprise the title-role in Offenbach’s Les Contes d’Hoffmann under the baton of Eun Sun Kim. Bernheim returned to the Opernhaus Zürich for the second time this season to perform the title-role in Massenet's Werther.

He signed an exclusive contract with Deutsche Grammophon in 2018, and his debut album, recorded with the PKF - Prague Philharmonia, conducted by Emmanuel Villaume was released on November 8, 2019. His second album, Boulevard des Italiens, was released on April 9, 2022.

== Recordings ==
- Boulevard des Italiens, April 9, 2022, Deutsche Grammophon, Orchestra del Teatro Comunale di Bologna, conducted by Frédéric Chaselin
- Les Contes d'Hoffmann, DVD, February 25, 2022, Recorded live at the Staatsoper Hamburg
- Benjamin Bernheim (debut album), 2019, Deutsche Grammophon, the PKF - Prague Philharmonia, conducted by Emmanuel Villaume.
- Faust by Gounod, 2019, singing the role of Faust, Bru Zane, Théâtre des Champs-Élysées with LES TALENS LYRIQUES conducted by Christophe Rousset.
- Œdipus rex by Igor Stravinsky, 2014 (DVD) singing the role of Berger. Théâtre des Champs-Élysées with the Orchestre national de France conducted by Daniele Gatti. CLC Production
- Fierrabras by Franz Schubert, 2014 (DVD) singing the role of Eginhard. Salzburger Festspiele production, conducted by Ingo Metzmacher, and directed by Peter Stein. Unitel Classica
- Capuleti e i Montecchi by Vincenzo Bellini, 2015 (DVD) singing the role of Tebaldo at the Opernhaus Zürich conducted by Fabio Luisi and directed by Christof Loy. Accentus Music
- Otello by Giuseppe Verdi, 2016 (DVD) singing the role of Cassio in a production at the Salzburger Osterfestspiele, conducted by Christian Thielemann, directed by Vincent Boussard. Unitel
- Manon Lescaut by Giacomo Puccini, 2016, singing the role of Edmondo conducted by Marco Armiliato, Deutsche Grammophon

== Awards ==
- Artiste Lyrique de l'Année (Artist of the Year) at the Victoires de la musique classique Awards in France, 2024
- Artiste Lyrique de l’Année (Opera Singer of the Year) at the Les Victoires de la Musique Awards in France, 2020
- Personnalité musicale de l'année” (Musical Personality of the Year) by Le Syndicat professionnel de la critique de théâtre, musique et danse, 2020
- Nachwuchskünstler (Newcomer of the year) by Opus Klassik, 2020
- Choc de Classica for his debut album by Classica Magazine, 2020
- Diapason d’Or by Diapason, 2020
- Chevalier des Arts et des Lettres, 2021
