= Iassen Ghiuselev =

Bulgarian illustrator (born 1964)

Iassen Ghiuselev (born 1964) is a Bulgarian illustrator of many classic stories including Pinocchio, Alice in Wonderland and The King of the Golden River.

Ghiuselev was born in Sofia, Bulgaria, in 1964. His father is the Bulgarian opera singer Nicola Ghiuselev. Iassen Ghiuselev attended the School of Art in Sofia and then studied at the National Academy of Art. He graduated in 1990 and started work as a freelance illustrator.

Ghuiselev creates cover pictures, graphics and other illustrations for some of the best-known publishers and magazines in Sofia. He also works with the magazines Vanity Fair and Vogue in Italy.

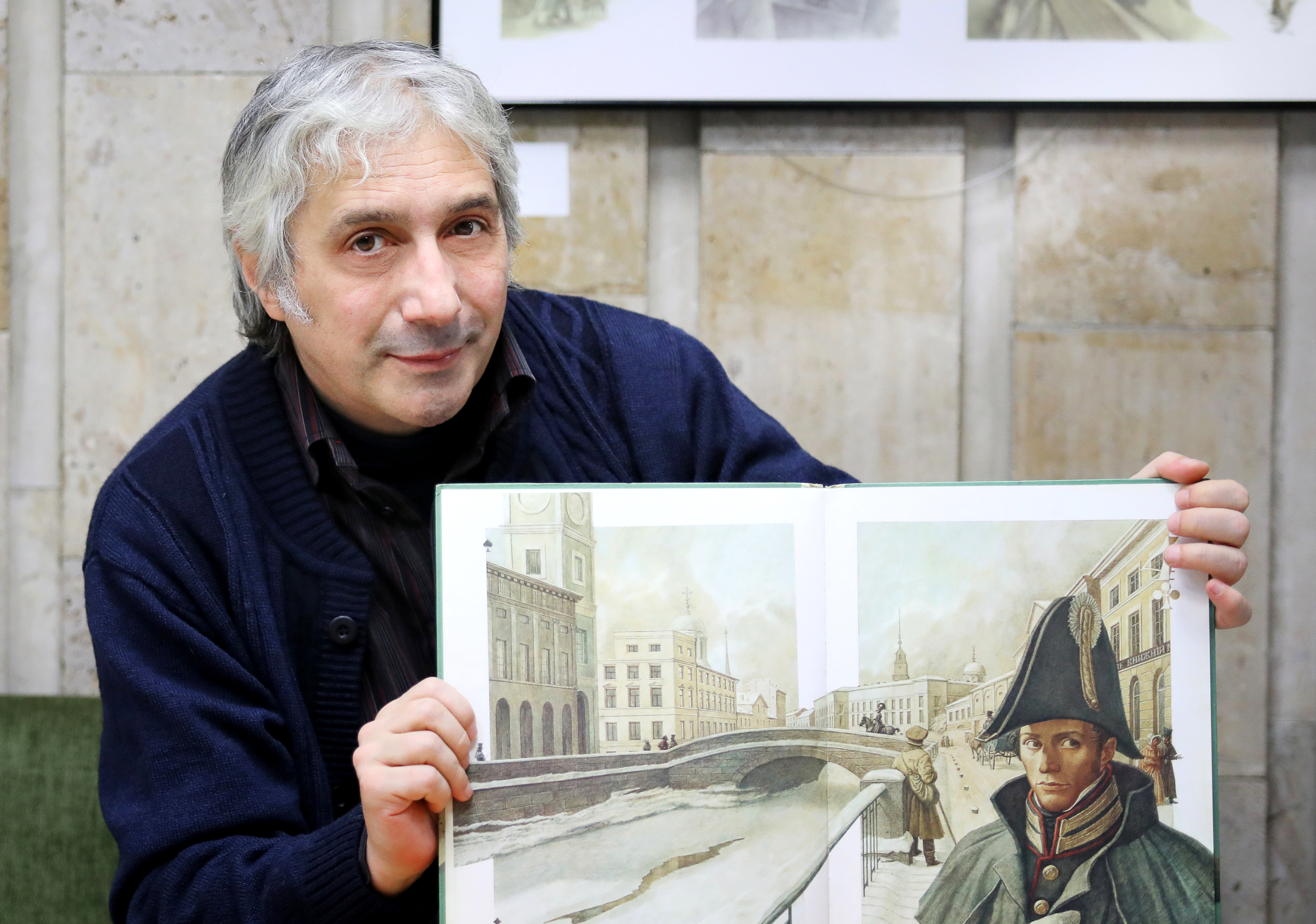
Iassen Ghiuselev

== Awards ==
Die Zeit and Radio Bremen awarded him the LUCHS 93 prize for his illustrations in The Queen Bee, published by Esslinger. The American Institute of Graphic Arts designated Pinocchio as one of the Fifty Best Books of 2001 in its annual juried contest. Pinocchio also won the 2002 Independent Publisher award for juvenile fiction, and was the recipient of the Alcuin Society Book Design honorable mention in 2001. Alice's Adventures in Wonderland took 3rd Prize at the 22nd Annual Awards for Excellence in Book Design in Canada (2003) from The Alcuin Society.

== Bibliography ==
- Lewis Carroll's Alice 2007 Calendar (2006) ISBN 978-1-894965-45-3
- Da Vinci Tarot Kit (2006) ISBN 978-0-7387-0894-2
- The King of the Golden River (2005) ISBN 978-1-894965-15-6
- Pendulum Power Magic/Pendulo poder y magia (2005) ISBN 978-0-7387-0609-2
- Alice's Adventures in Wonderland (2003) ISBN 978-1-894965-00-2
- The Queen Bee (2003) ISBN 978-0-9688768-4-8
- Las aventuras de Pinocho (2003) ISBN 978-84-261-3289-5
- Pinocchio: The Story of A Puppet (2002) ISBN 978-0-9688768-0-0
- Michelangelo: Renaissance Artist (Great Names) (2002) ISBN 978-1-59084-156-3
- Socrates: Greek Philosopher (Great Names) (2002) ISBN 978-1-59084-150-1
- Tarot of the III Millennium (2001) ISBN 978-0-7387-0167-7
- Orpheus and Eurydice (2001) ISBN 978-0-89236-624-8
- Orpheus und Euridike (1997) ISBN 978-3-480-20094-8
- Arthur and Excalibur: The Legend of King Arthur and the Great Magic Sword (1995) ISBN 978-0-7500-2086-2
