= 1492 epopea lirica d'America =

1992 opera by Antonio Braga

1492 epopea lirica d'America (1492 American lyric epic) is an opera in four acts by Antonio Braga. Composed from 1985 to 1989, it stage premiered on 13 October 1992 at the Teatro Nacional in Santo Domingo to mark the Columbus Quincentenary.

== Recordings ==
- 1492 epopea lirica d'America with the Orchestra Nazionale di San Domingo and conductor Carlos Piantini, Jolanta Omilian (soprano), Salvatore Ragonese, Danilo Serraiocco (bass-baritone), and Gwendolyn Jones (soprano) (Bongiovanni 1994)
