= Antonio Braga =

Italian composer (1929–2009)

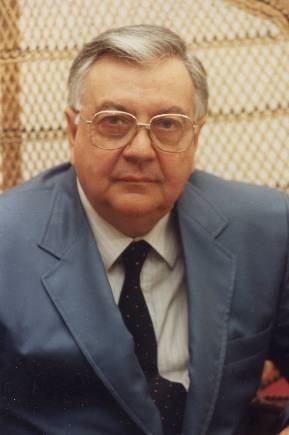
Antonio Braga

Antonio Braga (22 January 1929 – 26 May 2009 in Naples) was an Italian classical composer. Born in Naples, he wrote ballets, concerto, ouvertures, symphonies and three operas.

== Works ==
=== Ballets ===
- Les Abeilles a Naples (1955)
- C’è un albero a New York (1960)
- El trono de Abomè (1988)

=== Symphony and Concertos ===
- Ouverture napolitaine (1955)
- Concerto exotique (1959)
- Travel into Latins (1969)
- Hispaniola (1969)
- My four city (1997)

=== Operas and oratorios ===
- 1492 epopea lirica d'America (1992)
- San Domenico di Guzman (1997)
- San Francesco d'Assisi

=== Adaptation ===
Translation from Neapolitan language to French of Miseria e nobiltà (1887) (Misère et Noblesse, 1956) by Eduardo Scarpetta.

== Bibliography ==
- Andrea Jelardi, Il maestro Antonio Braga, in: Realtà Sannita n.11 del 16.10.1998
