= Christine Rice =

English mezzo-soprano

Christine Imogen Rice MBE is an English operatic mezzo-soprano. She has performed across Europe at venues including the Royal Opera House, the Bavarian State Opera, the Frankfurt Opera, the Teatro Real and the English National Opera. From 2004 to 2006 she was a BBC Radio 3 New Generation Artist.

== Education ==
Rice comes from Manchester, England. Her father was a chemistry lecturer and she intended to pursue a career in science. She attended Withington Girls' School and went on to study physics at Balliol College, Oxford before beginning a DPhil which she did not finish. Rice spent a gap year at the Royal Northern College of Music, after which she decided to embark upon a career as a singer.

== Musical career ==
Her first singing job was as part of the chorus of the Glyndebourne Festival Opera. Soon after, she signed a four-year contract with the English National Opera, also singing at other opera houses such as La Monnaie, where she was spotted by Antonio Pappano. When he became the music director at the Royal Opera House, he invited her to sing there.

== Repertoire ==
Rice's roles include:

- Angelina in Rossini's La Cenerentola at the Glyndebourne Festival Opera
- Ariadne in Birtwistle's The Minotaur at the Royal Opera House
- Ariodante in Handel's Ariodante at the Bavarian State Opera
- Arsace in Handel's Partenope at the English National Opera
- Béatrice in Berlioz's Béatrice et Bénédict at the Opéra-Comique
- Carmen in Bizet's Carmen at the Glyndebourne Festival Opera, the Royal Opera House (3D Blue-Ray Opus Arte 3D7096) and the Deutsche Oper Berlin
- Concepción in Ravel's L'heure espagnole at the Royal Opera House
- Diana in Cavalli's La Calisto at the Grand Théâtre de Genève
- Dorabella in Mozart's Così fan tutte at the Bavarian State Opera
- Dritte Dame in Mozart's Die Zauberflöte at the Royal Opera House
- Giulietta in Offenbach's Les contes d'Hoffmann at the Royal Opera House, the DNO and the Met
- Hansel in Humperdinck's Hansel and Gretel at the Royal Opera House
- Irene in Handel's Theodora at Glasgow City Halls and the Glyndebourne Festival Opera
- Judith in Bartók's Bluebeard's Castle at the Royal Opera House
- Lucretia in Britten's The Rape of Lucretia at the Royal Opera House
- Marguerite in Berlioz's La damnation de Faust at the English National Opera
- Miranda in Adès's The Tempest at the Royal Opera House
- Nerone in Handel's Agrippina at the English National Opera
- Penelope in Monteverdi's Il ritorno d'Ulisse in patria at the Frankurt Opera
- Rinaldo in Handel's Rinaldo at the Bavarian State Opera
- Rosina in Rossini's Il barbiere di Siviglia at the Garsington Opera
- Siébel in Gounod's Faust at the Royal Opera House
- Suzuki in Puccini's Madama Butterfly at the Royal Opera House

== Honours, awards and nominations ==
Rice was nominated for a Laurence Olivier Award in 2009 for Outstanding Achievement in Opera for her performance in Partenope at The English National Opera and The Minotaur at The Royal Opera House. She was later nominated for an Olivier Award in the same category in 2022 for her performance in 4/4 at The Royal Opera House.

Rice was appointed Member of the Order of the British Empire (MBE) in the 2023 New Year Honours for services to opera.
