= Michael Langdon =

British bass opera singer

Langdon as Baron Ochs in Der Rosenkavalier

Michael Langdon CBE (born Frank Birtles; 12 November 1920 – 12 March 1991) was a British bass opera singer. Despite little musical training, he joined the chorus of the Covent Garden Opera Company after the Second World War, graduating to minor and then major solo roles. Covent Garden remained his base throughout his career, but he sang as a guest in opera houses in Continental Europe and the Americas.

Langdon was particularly noted for his performance as Baron Ochs in Richard Strauss's Der Rosenkavalier, which he sang more than a hundred times in opera houses from London to Paris, Buenos Aires, New York and Vienna. Although known for playing comic roles like Ochs, he could be menacing when required, as in the role of Claggart in Benjamin Britten's Billy Budd or the villains in Wagner's Der Ring Des Nibelungen.

Langdon announced his retirement from the stage in 1977, and became the founding director of the National Opera Studio, training the next generation of singers for the operatic stage.

== Life and career ==
=== Early years ===
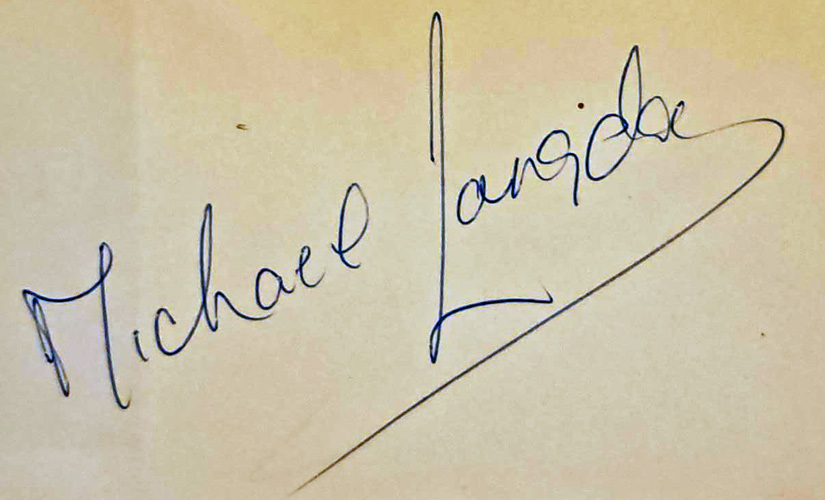
Michael Langdons signature

Langdon was born in Wolverhampton on 12 November 1920, the only child of Henry Birtles (1867–1931), licensed victualler, and his wife, Violet Mary, née Price (1881–1966). Both parents had been married before, and his father, the landlord of The Traveller's Rest, already had six children, who were all grown-up when Langdon was born. As a boy, Langdon was given piano lessons, and although as he recalled in his memoirs he would much rather have been playing football he was later grateful for his early musical education: "Although I never became an accomplished pianist, I did learn to read music and to play straightforward accompaniments". He sang rarely as a boy, and it was not until he was sixteen and his voice broke that he became interested in singing.

He attended a local school, Bushbury Hill, after which he was taken on as a junior clerk at the Wolverhampton and District Permanent Building Society. He disliked the job and at the age of nineteen he joined the Royal Air Force. During the Second World War his singing in concerts impressed his comrades, including his future wife, Vera Laura Duffield. They married on 19 June 1947 and had two daughters.

Returning to the building society after the war was not a prospect Langdon relished. He took singing lessons and successfully auditioned for the 1946 Christmas pantomime at the Grand Theatre, Wolverhampton, singing in a vocal quartet. The manager of the theatre advised him to change his name from Frank Birtles:

"People will call you Beetles, Bottles, Battles, everything but Birtles," he said. At that very moment he happened to look out of his office window and saw a bread van going past. On its side was emblazoned "Langdon's Bread". "That's it", said [the manager]. "Langdon. That has a nice ring to it. Now what about a first name? How about Michael? Michael Langdon sounds right." And so Michael Langdon I became.

=== Covent Garden ===
The Langdons moved to London. Michael hoped for lucrative engagements in pantomimes or summer seasons of popular shows, pending which he reluctantly took an office job as a clerk. That job was short-lived as Langdon successfully auditioned for the chorus of the new opera company being formed by David Webster at Covent Garden. He quickly abandoned thoughts of pantomimes and summer seasons and became firmly committed to opera. The musical director, Karl Rankl, when taking Langdon on for the chorus had warned him not to expect promotion into solo roles, but after covering for an absent singer as the King in Aida and an ailing one in Bliss's The Olympians Langdon was given the role of the King in his own right and understudied the roles of Varlaam in Boris Godunov, Sparafucile in Rigoletto and Zuniga in Carmen. By the end of 1950, he had added other small roles to his repertoire, appearing in Tosca, Il trovatore and The Queen of Spades. In 1951, he created the roles of Apollyon in Vaughan Williams's The Pilgrim's Progress and Lieutenant Ratcliffe in Britten's Billy Budd and played Titurel in Parsifal.

Langdon's progress in the Covent Garden company, encouraged by Rankl, seemed at risk when a new musical director, Rafael Kubelik, took over. Langdon contemplated an offer from the Deutsche Oper am Rhein, Düsseldorf, but decided against it, not wishing to disrupt his settled family life in Britain (or, he said, to miss seeing football matches featuring Wolverhampton Wanderers, of whom he was a devoted supporter). His position at Covent Garden was assured when at short notice he stepped in to take the brief but pivotal role of the Grand Inquisitor in Luchino Visconti's starry new production of Verdi's Don Carlos in a cast including Boris Christoff, Tito Gobbi and Jon Vickers, conducted by Carlo Maria Giulini. This established him as a leading performer at the house.

During his Royal Opera career Langdon created the roles of the Recorder of Norwich in Britten's Gloriana (1953), the He-Ancient in Tippet's The Midsummer Marriage (1955) and the Doctor in Henze's We Come to the River (1976). His other roles included from the German repertoire: Osmin (Die Entführung aus dem Serail), Sarastro (The Magic Flute), Fafner, Hunding and Hagen (Der Ring des Nibelungen), Daland (Der Fliegende Holländer), Rocco (Fidelio), Count Waldner (Arabella), and his best-known part, Baron Ochs in Der Rosenkavalier, which he studied in Vienna with Alfred Jerger, who had sung the role under the composer. Basses without a real bottom E are known to disguise the fact by singing into a glass of wine in their hand when the note comes. Jerger heard what Langdon could do and said "Aha! Mer Brauch'n ka' Wein" – no wine needed. Langdon sang Ochs more than a hundred times in Britain and at overseas houses including Paris, Vienna, Buenos Aires and New York.

His Italian roles included Don Basilio (The Barber of Seville), the title role in Don Pasquale (for Scottish Opera), as well as the Grand Inquisitor in Don Carlos. He sang Kecal in The Bartered Bride and Pantheus in Les Troyens. He played Bottom in Britten's A Midsummer Night's Dream, and moved up from the supporting role of Ratcliffe to a key part as the evil Claggart in Billy Budd, which he never performed at Covent Garden, but played on television and, under the direction of the composer, in the recording studio.

=== Later years ===
In 1977 Langdon announced his retirement, although he reappeared the following year as Colonel Frank in Covent Garden's Die Fledermaus. In 1979 he became the first director of the National Opera Studio. He came out of retirement to make further appearances as Colonel Frank in the 1983–84 season at Covent Garden, his farewell to the stage.

Langdon was awarded the CBE in 1973. He died in Hove on 12 March 1991, aged 70, survived by his widow and daughters. His granddaughter is Pippa Taylor, Executive producer on the Chris Moyles radio show.

== Recordings ==
Langdon recorded few of the performances for which he was known. Decca recorded his Claggart, and was to have recorded his Ochs, but for unexplained reasons this did not happen. Excerpts of his performance in the role for Scottish Opera, with Helga Dernesch, were recorded, and he is heard in part of Act Two in a 1968 Decca set celebrating Covent Garden. He sang in Sir Thomas Beecham's recording of Haydn's The Seasons, and as Dr Bartolo in Otto Klemperer's set of The Marriage of Figaro.

In addition, Langdon sang Bardolph to the Falstaff of Fernando Corena in a 1963 set of scenes from Falstaff, and Louis in a 1974 recording of Holst's The Wandering Scholar. For David Willcocks, Langdon recorded music by Thomas Tallis and two of Handel's Chandos Anthems, both in 1965. Langdon also played L'ombra del nino in a 1966 set of Rossini's Semiramide, starring his old colleague Joan Sutherland.

== Sources ==
- Langdon, Michael (1982). Notes From a Low Singer. London and New York: Julia MacRae. ISBN 978-0-53-109877-6.
