= Cyrille Dubois =

French tenor (born 1984)

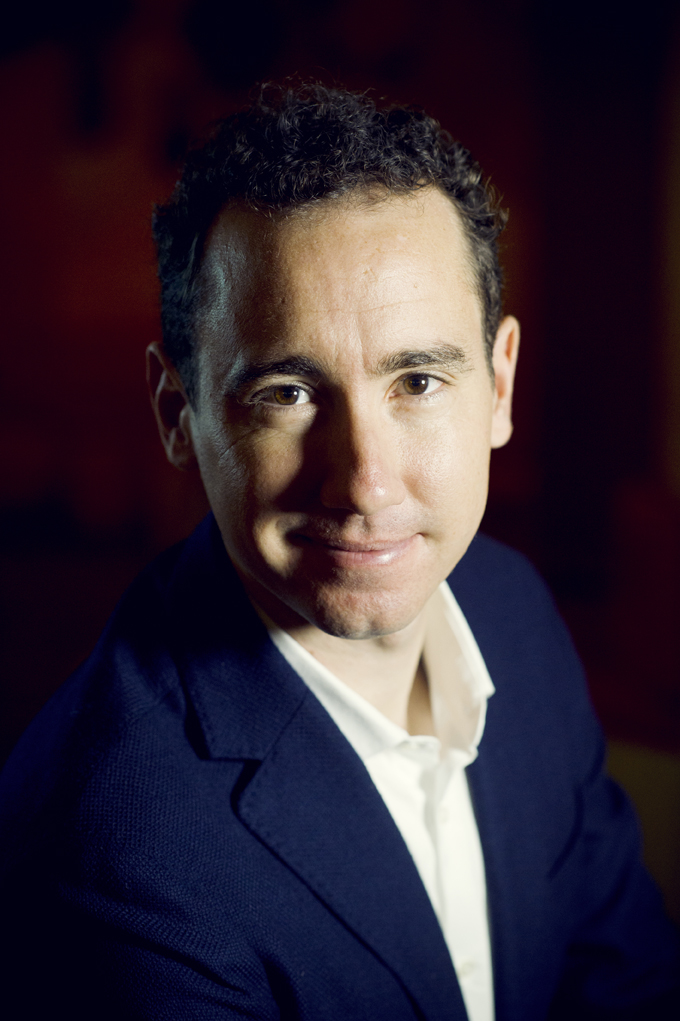

Background information
- Born: 27 September 1984 (age 41)
- Origin: France
- Occupation: Classical tenor
- Website: cyrille-dubois.fr

Cyrille Dubois (born 27 September 1984) is a French tenor performing as an opera and lieder singer.

== Early life and education ==
Cyrille Dubois spent his childhood in Ouistreham in Normandy, France. As a child he demonstrated an early talent for singing and joined the Maîtrise de Caen (Note: a choir linked to a school with special arranged schedules) as a soprano where he read music and studied the organ. At age 14 he was Miles in the Turn of the Screw at the Opéra de Lyon. While studying at the Rennes Superior School for Agronomy where he took his degree in fisheries science, he continued practising singing as a tenor at the Rennes Conservatory. In 2008 he was admitted to the Conservatoire de Paris and in 2010 to the Paris Opera workshop that gave him the opportunity to sing and play major opera parts.

== Career ==
In 2010 Dubois created the Duo Contraste with pianist Tristan Raës. Together they have performed recitals in France at Opéra Bastille and other concert halls, such as in Venice, Italy, at Wigmore Hall, England, and the Hermitage Theatre in St Petersburg, Russia.

In 2012 he portrayed Nathanaël in les Contes d'Hoffmann at La Scala. The following year he made his début with the Théatre de la Monnaie in Brussels as Azor in La Dispute, a contemporary opera by Benoît Mernier. A performance as Gérald in Lakmé followed. In 2014 he sang Oronte in Alcina, Pâris in La Belle Hélène and was Coelio in les Caprices de Marianne by Henri Sauguet and toured around France. In 2015, he performed as Narciso in Il Turco in Italia and made his début at the Glyndebourne Festival Opera in Maurice Ravel's L'heure espagnole. The same year he appeared as Brighella in Ariadne auf Naxos and Worker in Le Roi Arthus. In 2016 he performed as Marzio in Mitridate, re di Ponto and Belmonte in Die Entführung aus dem Serail.

== Awards ==
- In 2010 the Duo Contraste won first prize of the Lili and Nadia Boulanger competition.
- In 2013 the Duo Contraste was awarded a further three prizes at the Lyon Chamber Music Competition.
- In 2015 Dubois won the Opera Singer-Best Newcomer prize at les Victoires de la musique classique
- In 2023 Cyrille Dubois and his pianist Tristan Raës were awarded the Gramophone Classical Music Awards for their performance in Fauré Complete Songs

== Discography ==
=== Chamber music ===
- Les Clairières dans le ciel, Cyrille Dubois, ténor, Tristan Raës, piano. 2015Classica (magazine)
- Portrait de Félicien David, Mélodies conducted by Hervé Niquet, 2017
- LISZT : "O LIEB!", lieder. Cyrille Dubois, ténor / Tristan Raës, piano.2018. Diapason d'Or et choc classica
- Mélodies de Lili et Nadia Boulanger, Cyrille Dubois, ténor/Tristan Raës, piano, 2020, choix de France Musique
- Canticles (Britten) : Cyrille Dubois (tenor) and Anne Le Bozec (piano); Wladimir Dubois (horn); Pauline Haas (harp); Marc Mauillon (baritone); Paul-Antoine Bénos-Djian (countertenor), 2020
- Alfred Bruneau, La nuit de mai with pianist Jeff Cohen, 2020
- Gabriel Fauré, Complete Songs, with Tristan Raës, 2022
- Louis Beydts, Melodies & Songs, with Tristan Raës, 2024
- Gabriel Dupont, The Complete Songs, with Tristan Raës, 2025

=== Opera ===
Dubois has appeared as leading role on opera recordings such as Saint-Phar in Grétry's La Caravane du Caire conducted by Guy Van Waas; Marzio in Mozart's Mitridate conducted by Emmanuelle Haïm, Mercury in Lully, Persée 1770 with Hervé Niquet in 2017; title role of Pygmalion (Rameau) with Christophe Rousset, 2017; Iopas in Les Troyens (Hector Berlioz), with John Nelson, 2017; Curiace in les Horaces (Salieri) with Christophe Rousset, 2017; Nadir in Les Pêcheurs de Perles (Bizet) with Alexandre Bloch, 2018; (Note: Dubois's aria La romance de Nadir is used on the soundtrack of the film the Father) Gérard in La Reine de Chypre (Fromental Halévy) with Hervé Niquet, 2018; Colin in Le Devin du Village (Jean-Jacques Rousseau) with Sébastien d'Hérin, recorded at Versailles, 2018; title role in Fortunio (André Messager), 2019; title role in Tarare (Salieri) with Christophe Rousset, 2019; Loti in L'île du Rêve (Reynaldo Hahn) with Hervé Niquet, 2020; Dardanus (Jean-Philippe Rameau) with György Vashegyi, 2021; L'Autre in Point-d'Orgue, music by Thierry Escaich, libretto and staging by Olivier Py, 2021; Jason in Médée (Marc-Antoine Charpentier), with Hervé Niquet, 2023;
