= Julie Roset =

French soprano

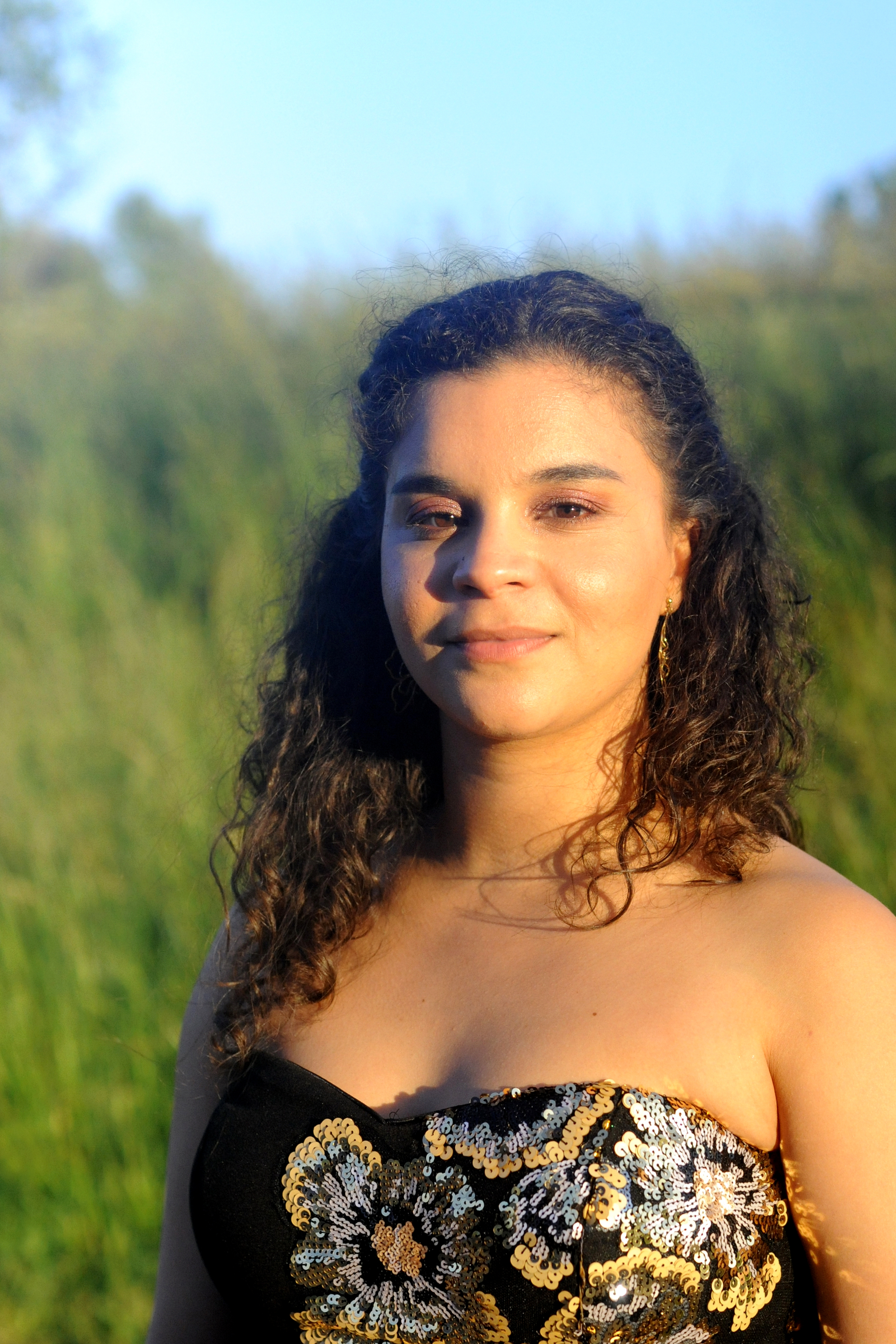
2026 portrait by Sylvain lasco

Julie Thyana Roset is a French operatic soprano.

She won the 2022 Metropolitan Opera Laffont Competition.

== Biography ==
Julie Roset was born in Avignon, and began singing at the age of 7, at the Grand Avignon Conservatory and at the Opera's Choir School. She studied operatic singing with Valérie Marestin from the age of 15.

She graduated with honors from the Geneva University of Music in 2019 in the class of Lucien Kandel. In 2019, she met Edith Wiens, at the Aix-en-Provence Academy, which opened the door to the Juilliard School. She studied there, two years and in 2022 won the Laffont Competition Prize at the Metropolitan Opera. She recorded Handel's Salve Regina, Gloria, and motet Silete venti, with the Millennium Orchestra conducted by Leonardo García-Alarcón.

In July 2022, she was Amour/Valetto in L'incoronazione di Poppea staged by Ted Huffman and conducted by Leonardo García Alarcón at the Aix-en-Provence Festival.

In January 2023, she participated in Renée Fleming's Song Studio Academy at Carmegie Hall. In June 2023, she played in André Grétry's Zémire et Azor, at the Opéra-Comique. She performed twice at the Basilica of Saint-Denis as part of the Saint-Denis Festival, singing Haydn in a new work by Julien Chauvin and under the direction of conductor Leonardo García-Alarcón for Pasion Argentina. In August 2023, she made her Salzburg Festival debut, in the role of Tamiri in Il Re Pastore, directed by Adam Fischer.

In November 2023, she won the first opera prize of the Operalia competition.

In September 2023, she released the first album dedicated to Luzzasco Luzzaschi by the ensemble La Néréide, which she co-founded with soprano singers Camille Allérat and Ana Vieira Leite. In May 2024, she was featured at the Saint-Denis Festival, with the ensemble La Néréide.

In January 2024, she performed at the Nancy Opera for Joseph Haydn 's Die Schöpfung (The Creation), conducted by Marta Gardolinska. In May 2024, she appeared at the Paris Opera as Amour (Medea) created by David McVicar and conducted by William Christie. In July 2024, she returned to the Aix-en-Provence Festival in Rameau 's Samson conducted by Raphaël Pichon.

La Néréide's second album, "Le cœur et la raison", was released in September 2025, around Clérambault 's Miserere and serious airs.

In 2025, she won the Victoire de la musique classique award, in the category of new operatic artist .

In November 2025, she made her Metropolitan Opera debut in Richard Strauss 's Arabella. In January 2026, she performed at the Opéra-Comique in the role of Sophie in Jules Massenet 's Werther.

On 16 January 2026, she released a new album "M'a dit Amour", accompanied by pianist Susan Manoff. They will perform at Opera Comique, Lied Festival Victoria de los Ángeles, and the Edinburgh International Festival.
