= Ermonela Jaho =

Albanian operatic soprano (born 1974)

- Born: July 18, 1974 (age 52); Tirana, Albania
- Genres: Opera
- Occupation: Opera singer (soprano)
- Years active: 1992–present
- Website: www.ermonelajaho.com

Ermonela Jaho (born July 18, 1974) is an Albanian operatic soprano. She was described in The Economist as "the world’s most acclaimed soprano". The Financial Times said "Ermonela Jaho throws heart and soul into her singing... Don't even try to resist".

The Guardian has described her as "one of the great verismo interpreters". and on another article "Ermonela Jaho triumphs in Madama Butterfly".

== Education ==
Jaho began studying singing at the age of six. After completing her studies at the Liceu Artistik "Jordan Misja" in Tirana in 1992, she entered the Academy of Fine Arts in Tirana where she studied for one year. After winning a competition organized by the Italian soprano Katia Ricciarelli in Albania, she moved to Italy in 1993 where she studied for one year at the Academy of Mantova. After completing her studies she joined the Accademia Nazionale di Santa Cecilia in Rome, where she studied singing and piano for five years. She has also studied with mezzo-soprano Catherine Green, wife of Alan Green, Jaho's manager.

== Career ==
She has won many international competitions including the Giacomo Puccini competition in Milan, Italy 1997, Spontini International Competition in Ancona, Italy 1998, Zandonai in Rovereto, Italy 1999, and The Best Singer at the Wexford Festival, 2000. She has performed in opera houses worldwide including the Royal Opera in London, the Metropolitan Opera, Teatro Real Madrid, the Berlin Staatsoper, Opera National de Paris, Theatre des Champs-Élysées, Staatsoper Vienna, Bayerische Staatsoper, Opera Australia, Teatro Colón Buenos Aires, Gran Teatre del Liceu Barcelona, Teatro alla Scala, Teatro San Carlo Naples, Theatro Municipal de Sae Paulo, Opera Company of Philadelphia, Opéra de Marseille, Arena di Verona, etc. Her repertoire includes Violetta in La traviata, Maria Stuarda, Madame Butterfly, Manon, Mireille, Amina in La sonnambula, Mimi in La bohème, Michaela in Carmen, Giulietta in I Capuleti e i Montecchi, Angelica in Suor Angelica, Anna Bolena, etc.

In 2016 she won the Readers' award (public's award) at International Opera Awards in London.
