= Gérard Serkoyan =

French opera singer

Gérard Serkoyan (14 July 1922 – 8 February 2004) was an operatic bass.

== Life ==
Serkoyan was born in Istanbul. His father was a choir director at the Armenian church and a composer. He began his vocal training very early on. Leaving his studies as a dentist, he perfected his vocal technique with tenor Paul Razavet, a former tenor of La Monnaie in Brussels and the Opéra-Comique, in 1947. After an audition, he began his career at the Opéra de Nice in 1949 where he remained in the troupe for two years, notably alongside the French baritone Gabriel Bacquier. Before taking in the role of Colline in La Bohème, he was given various small roles including the Chiffonnier in Charpentier's' Louise.

He joined the Opéra de Lyon in 1950 and performed his major roles there for the first time, Sarastro in Mozart's Die Zauberflöte, also including Rangoni in Moussorgski's Boris Godunov and the King in Wagner's Lohengrin. After a six-month stint at the Opéra de Strasbourg, he joined the Paris Opera troupe in 1952. At the Opéra Garnier and the Salle Favart he distinguished himself in the greatest bass roles: Sparafucile (Rigoletto), Daland (Der Fliegende Holländer), Ramfis (Aida), Pimen (Boris Godunov), Mephistopheles (Faust), Raimondo (Lucia di Lammermoor), and Hunding (Die Walküre).

Serkoyan is buried in Cadière d'Azur cemetery.

== Bibliography and sources ==
- Stéphane Wolff, Un demi-siècle d'Opéra-Comique (1900-1950), éd. André Bonne, Paris, 1953
- Revue Le Guide du concert et du disque, years 1959-1960
- Revue L'Entracte, years 1960-1967
- Stéphane Wolff, L'Opéra au Palais Garnier (1875-1962), L'Entracte, Paris, 1962 - Rééd. coll. Ressources, Champion-Slatkine, Geneva, 1983 ISBN 2-05-000214-9
- Étienne Ducarme and Jean Gabriel, Vingt deux années d'art lyrique à Saint-Étienne (1964-1986), Imprilux, Saint-Étienne, 1987
- Jean-Philippe Mousnier, Albert Wolff – Eugène Bigot, coll. Univers musical, L'Harmattan, Paris, 2001 ISBN 978-2747513678
- Georges Farret, Alain Vanzo, le Werther du palais Garnier, coll. Temps Mémoire, éditions Autres Temps, Paris, 2007 ISBN 978-2845213067
- Erik Baeck, André Cluytens, itinéraire d'un chef d'orchestre, Mardaga, Wavre, 2009 ISBN 978-2804700119
