= Gustave Botiaux =

French tenor (1926–2025)

Gustave Botiaux (14 July 1926 – 28 December 2025) was a French tenor.

== Life and career ==
Botiaux was born in Puteaux on 14 July 1926. He was the winner of the 1954 Cannes tenor competition and performed at La Monnaie in Brussels in the 1955–56 season as Pinkerton in Puccini's Madama Butterfly. He then moved in 1956 to the Opéra Garnier where he appeared in leading roles for several years, as well as to the Salle Favart.

His vocal timbre and athletic physique led him to perform in many theatres in France and abroad, where roles included Samson in Samson et Dalila by Camille Saint-Saëns, Radames in Verdi's Aida, the title roles in Gounod's Roméo et Juliette and Faust, and in Massenet's Werther, Don José in Bizet's Carmen, Julien in Louise, Mario in Puccini's Tosca, the Duke of Mantua in Verdi's Rigoletto and Turiddu in Mascagni's Cavalleria rusticana. At this time at the Opéra-Comique the frequent programming of Cavalleria Rusticana and Leoncavallo's Pagliacci allowed Botiaux to shine in this double-bill. His reputation in these roles during the 1960s spread to Japan and the USSR.

The French provincial opera houses gave him two of his most noted roles: Vasco de Gama in Meyerbeer's L'Africaine, and Sigurd in the eponymous opera by Reyer. In the same period, he was also involved in the French-language revival of Puccini's La fanciulla del West, a work little represented in French-speaking countries at the time. He also appeared at major summer festivals, particularly at the Chorégies d'Orange and at the Arena of Nîmes in the role of Jean in Hérodiade.

A period of ill health led him to a break in his career from 1964 to 1968. He resumed in Hérodiade in Aix-en-Provence, and re-joined the RTLN troupe until 1973. There he undertook the role of Canio in Pagliacci again, and, outside his normal repertoire, Alfred in La Chauve-Souris by Johann Strauss. He also continued his career in the provinces, notably with many performances of Rigoletto, Carmen, and Tosca. In 1973, he retired from the stage.

Botiaux was married to soprano Jacqueline Silvy (1926–2024). He died on 28 December 2025 at the age of 99.

== Recordings ==
In the 1960s, Botiaux recorded four recitals of operatic arias as well as some extracts from Faust, Carmen, Das Land des Lächelns, Tosca, and Sigurd.
