= Guy Chauvet =

French opera singer

- Born: 2 October 1933; Montluçon, Allier, France
- Died: 25 March 2007 (aged 73)
- Occupation: Operatic tenor

Guy Chauvet (2 October 1933 – 25 March 2007) was a French operatic tenor.

== Biography ==
Guy Chauvet was born in Montluçon, Allier, on 2 October 1933. He began singing as a child in the choir of the cathedral of his town. He took voice lessons in his native city with Bernard Baillour. He began winning a series of singing competitions in 1952 and in 1953 he won a prestigious international singing competition in Cannes. Hee was the youngest member of the tenor competition and one of five prizewinners, with Alain Vanzo, Tony Poncet, Roger Gardes and Gustave Botiaux. In 1955 he won first prize in the International Singing Competition of Toulouse, and in 1957 he won the Voix d'Or prize which earned him a contract with the Paris Opera.

Chauvet made his professional opera debut at the Palais Garnier as an Armored Man in The Magic Flute on 12 January 1959. To begin with, he held third roles in Aida with Renata Tebaldi and Rita Gorr and also in Samson et Dalila with Mario Del Monaco. He became the youngest tenor of the Paris Opera in the role of Faust in La Damnation de Faust on 20 September 1959. He has the same singing teachers as Georges Thill. His career as a strong tenor was thwarted by his teachers, and he only acquired his C at the age of 32.

Régine Crespin choose him as Énée in Les Troyens by Berlioz; he next sang Arturo with Joan Sutherland as Lucia. He triumphed by interpreting Florestan and also sang in the world premiere of Jean-Jacques Grunenwald's Sardanapale, produced at the Opéra de Monte-Carlo on 25 April 1961.

Régine Crespin, Fiorenza Cossotto (with whom he sang Samson and Delilah), Gabriel Bacquier and Jon Vickers all worked with him, and he regarded Andréa Guiot as a sister. After a performance of Samson and Delilah at the Metropolitan Opera (Met), he obtained a standing ovation from the audience.

When Placido Domingo sang his first Otello in Paris, Chauvet was dressed and ready in case it was required he intervene.

He was the only French tenor to have sung Aida in Verona alternating the role of Radames with Carlo Bergonzi in August 1971 during the centenary of the opera's creation.

He was part of the revival of Meyerbeer's Le prophète with Marilyn Horne at the Met in 1977.

Chauvet distinguished himself above all by the power of his emission, the timbre remaining clear and coppery throughout the whole range. He specialized in wide-ranging roles such as Faust of la damnation, Samson, Pagliacci, Otello, Radamès, Enée, Siegmund, Lohengrin, around the world and above all in performances with the Deutsche Oper Berlin. He was also the advocate of such little known operas as Cherubini's Les Abencérages.

Chauvet died in on 25 March 2007.
