= Helga Dernesch =

Austrian soprano and mezzo-soprano

- Helga Dernesch in The Force of Destiny, an opera by Giuseppe Verdi, 1961
- Born: 3 February 1939 (age 87); Vienna, Austria
- Education: Vienna Hochschule für Musik
- Occupation: Opera singer
- Organizations: Hessisches Staatstheater Wiesbaden; Cologne Opera; Bayreuth Festival

Helga Dernesch (born 3 February 1939) is an Austrian soprano and mezzo-soprano. Her career has taken her through four successive phases: from mezzo-soprano to lyric soprano to dramatic soprano, and after about 1980 back to mezzo again. "Her voice had great richness and power, and her strikingly handsome stage appearance and intense acting made her a compelling performer."

== Life and career ==
Born in Vienna, Dernesch studied at the Vienna Hochschule für Musik before making her debut in 1961 singing Marina in Boris Godunov in Bern. She continued to sing in Bern from 1961 to 1963, in Wiesbaden 1963-1965 and at the Cologne Opera from 1965 to 1968. She made her first appearance in Bayreuth (as Wellgunde in Der Ring des Nibelungen) in 1965. Two years later she was singing Elisabeth in Tannhäuser there, and Sieglinde with the Bayreuth Festival on tour in Osaka. She made her first appearance at the Salzburg Easter Festival in 1969. With Scottish Opera she performed Gutrune (1968), her first Leonore (1970), the Marschallin (1971), Brünnhilde, Isolde, Ariadne, and Cassandra.

She has also appeared in most of the world's other great opera houses, including Zürich, Amsterdam, Glyndebourne, London, Paris, San Francisco, New York and Chicago in such roles as Leonore, Sieglinde and Brünnhilde in Die Walküre, Isolde, The Dyer's Wife in Die Frau ohne Schatten, Clytemnestra in Elektra, Kabanicha in Káťa Kabanová, The Countess in Pique Dame, and Larina in Eugen Onegin. She continued to sing regularly at the Bavarian State Opera where she sang the Marschallin in 1979 and created the role of Goneril in the premiere of Aribert Reimann's Lear in 1978, a role she also sang in several other German houses and, in an English translation, at San Francisco Opera in 1981. In October 2000, she created the title role in another Reimann opera, Bernarda Albas Haus in Munich.

She made her Metropolitan Opera debut in 1985 as Marfa in Khovanshchina and subsequently sang Prince Orlofsky in Die Fledermaus (1986), Herodias in Salome, Fricka in Das Rheingold and Die Walküre, Waltraute in Götterdämmerung, and the Nurse Die Frau ohne Schatten (all during the 1989-1990 season). She returned to Met in 1994 for performances as Madame de Croissy in Dialogues des Carmélites and Adelaide in Arabella, and in 1995 as Leocadia Begbick in Rise and Fall of the City of Mahagonny.

In 1998 she sang Herodias for the Los Angeles Opera, and in 2009 she appeared as Grandmother Buryjovka in Jenufa at the Bavarian State Opera.

She is married to the Austrian tenor Werner Krenn (born 1943).

== Recordings ==
- During the late 1960s, Dernesch was a favorite interpreter of Herbert von Karajan, with whom she recorded Siegfried, Götterdämmerung, Tristan und Isolde, and Fidelio: in each case she sang the main female role. While she may not have been able to demonstrate power and steel like her colleague Birgit Nilsson on these recordings, her great emotional expression and her good vocal technique are shown to full advantage. A further highpoint in her discography is her recording of Tannhäuser with Georg Solti. She also recorded the Symphony #3 of Mahler with Solti and the Chicago Symphony.
- Highlights from Scottish Opera's production of Der Rosenkavalier were recorded in September 1974 for EMI's Classics for Pleasure label, sung in German with Dernesch as the Marschallin, Anne Howells as Octavian, Teresa Cahill as Sophie, and Michael Langdon as Baron Ochs, conducted by Alexander Gibson.
- There exists a live recording of Scottish Opera's 1971 Rosenkavalier sung in English, with Dernesch as the Marschallin, Dame Janet Baker as Octavian and Elizabeth Harwood as Sophie, from the King’s Theatre, Glasgow, conducted by Alexander Gibson.
- There is also a live-recording of Dernesch singing Sieglinde (with Silja, Adam, Thomas, Hoffmann, Nienstedt, conducted by Thomas Schippers) made in 1967 in Osaka with the Bayreuth festival on tour, in Wieland Wagner's production.

== Sources ==
- The Harvard Biographical Dictionary of Music article about Dernesch is available at
