= Nicola Ghiuselev =

Bulgarian bass singer (1936–2014)

- Никола Гюзелев
- Born: 17 August 1936; Pavlikeni, Kingdom of Bulgaria
- Died: 16 May 2014 (aged 77); Sofia, Republic of Bulgaria
- Resting place: Central Sofia Cemetery; 42°42′41.2″N 023°20′06.7″E
- Citizenship: Bulgarian
- Education: National Academy of Art, Sofia, Bulgaria
- Occupation: Opera singer (bass)
- Spouses: Roumiana Ghiuseleva (m. 1960; div. 1973) Annamaria Petrova-Ghiuseleva (m. 1984)
- Children: 3, including Iassen Ghiuselev
- Parents: Nicolai Ghiuselev (father); Elisaveta Ghiuseleva (mother)
- Awards: Commendatore dell'Ordine della Stella d'Italia (2005)

Nicola Ghiuselev (Bulgarian: Никола Гюзелев) (also Gyuzelev; 17 August 1936 – 16 May 2014) was a Bulgarian operatic bass, particularly associated with the Italian and Russian repertories.

== Biography ==
Ghiuselev was born on 17 August 1936 in Pavlikeni. He was the son of Nicolai Ghiuselev and Elisaveta Ghiuseleva. He studied painting at the Academy of Arts in Sofia, and later voice at the school of the National Opera of Sofia, with Christo Brambarov. He made his stage debut with that company, as Timur in Turandot, in 1960. In 1965, with the Sofia Opera, he toured Germany, the Netherlands and France, and made his debut at the Metropolitan Opera of New York, as Ramfis in Aida, quickly followed by King Philip II in Don Carlo, and the title role in Boris Godunov. In two seasons with the Met, he sang as Raimondo in Lucia di Lammermoor, the Commendatore in Don Giovanni, Colline in La bohème.

Important debuts followed at the Berlin State Opera, La Scala in Milan, the Vienna State Opera, the Monte Carlo Opera, the Palais Garnier in Paris, the Liceo in Barcelona, the San Carlo in Naples, the Royal Opera House in London, the Verona Arena, the Salzburg Festival, the Holland Festival, he also appeared in Moscow, Saint Petersburg, Prague, Budapest, Warsaw, Marseille, Toulouse, Chicago, Houston, among others.

Other notable roles include; Narbal in Les Troyens, Mephistopheles in Faust, Creonte in Medea, Padre Guardiano in La forza del destino, Banquo in Macbeth, Zaccaria in Nabucco, Silva in Ernani, Enrico in Anna Bolena, Galitzky in Prince Igor, the four villains in The Tales of Hoffmann, Mosè in Mosè in Egitto, Marcel in Les Huguenots, Gremin in Eugene Onegin, etc.

He died on 16 May 2014, aged 77.

== Selected recordings ==
- 1967 - La Gioconda - Renata Tebaldi, Carlo Bergonzi, Robert Merrill, Marilyn Horne, Nicola Ghiuselev - Coro e Orchestra dell'Accademia di Santa Cecilia, Lamberto Gardelli - (Decca)
- 1969 - Les Huguenots - Joan Sutherland, Martina Arroyo, Huguette Tourangeau, Anastasios Vrenios, Nicola Ghiuselev, Gabriel Bacquier, Dominic Cossa - Ambrosian Opera Chorus, New Philharmonia Orchestra, Richard Bonynge - (Decca)
- 1973 - "Boris Godunov" - Nicola Ghiuselev, Dimeter Damyanov, Alexandrina Milcheva - Sofia National Opera Chorus and Orchestra, Assen Naidenov - (Fidelio)
- 1986 - Faust - Alfredo Kraus, Ana Maria Gonzalez, Nicola Ghiuselev, Roberto Coviello - Orchestra Sinfonica dell'Emilia Romagna Arturo Toscanini e Coro del Teatro Regio di Parma, Alain Guingal - (Hardy Classic Video, Milan)
- 2004 - a new digital recording of the Bulgarian national anthem, with Raina Kabaivanska, Nicola Ghiuselev, Roberta and Orlin Goranov, with the Sofia Philharmonic Orchestra and the National Philharmonic Choir under Nayden Todorov.

== Honours ==
- Mount Ghiuselev on Brabant Island, Antarctica is named after Nicola Ghiuselev.
- Commendatore dell'Ordine della Stella d'Italia
- Doctor Honoris Causa of the Bulgarian Academy of Sciences

== Sources ==
- Anderson, James (1993). "Ghiuselev, Nicola". The Complete Dictionary of Opera & Operetta. Wings Book. p. 229. ISBN 0-517-09156-9.
- Brashovanova, Lada (1990). "Gyuzelev, Nikola". In Sadie, Stanley (ed.). New Grove Dictionary of Music and Musicians. Vol. 7 (1st ed.). Macmillan Publishers Limited. p. 872. ISBN 9781561591749.

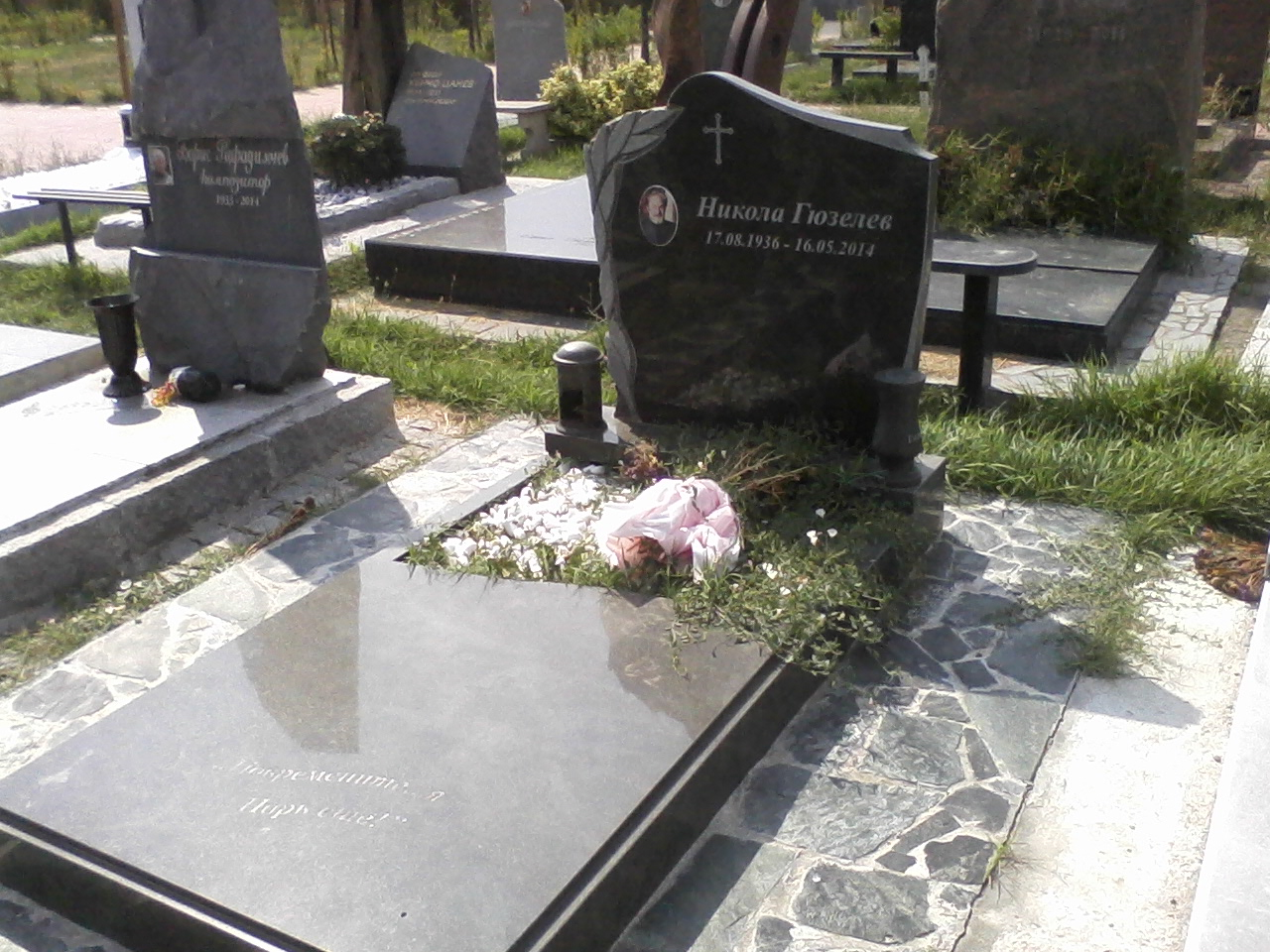
Nicola Ghiuselev's Grave in Sofia Central Cemetery (42°42′41.2″N 023°20′06.7″E)
