= International Opera Awards =

Award for excellence in opera

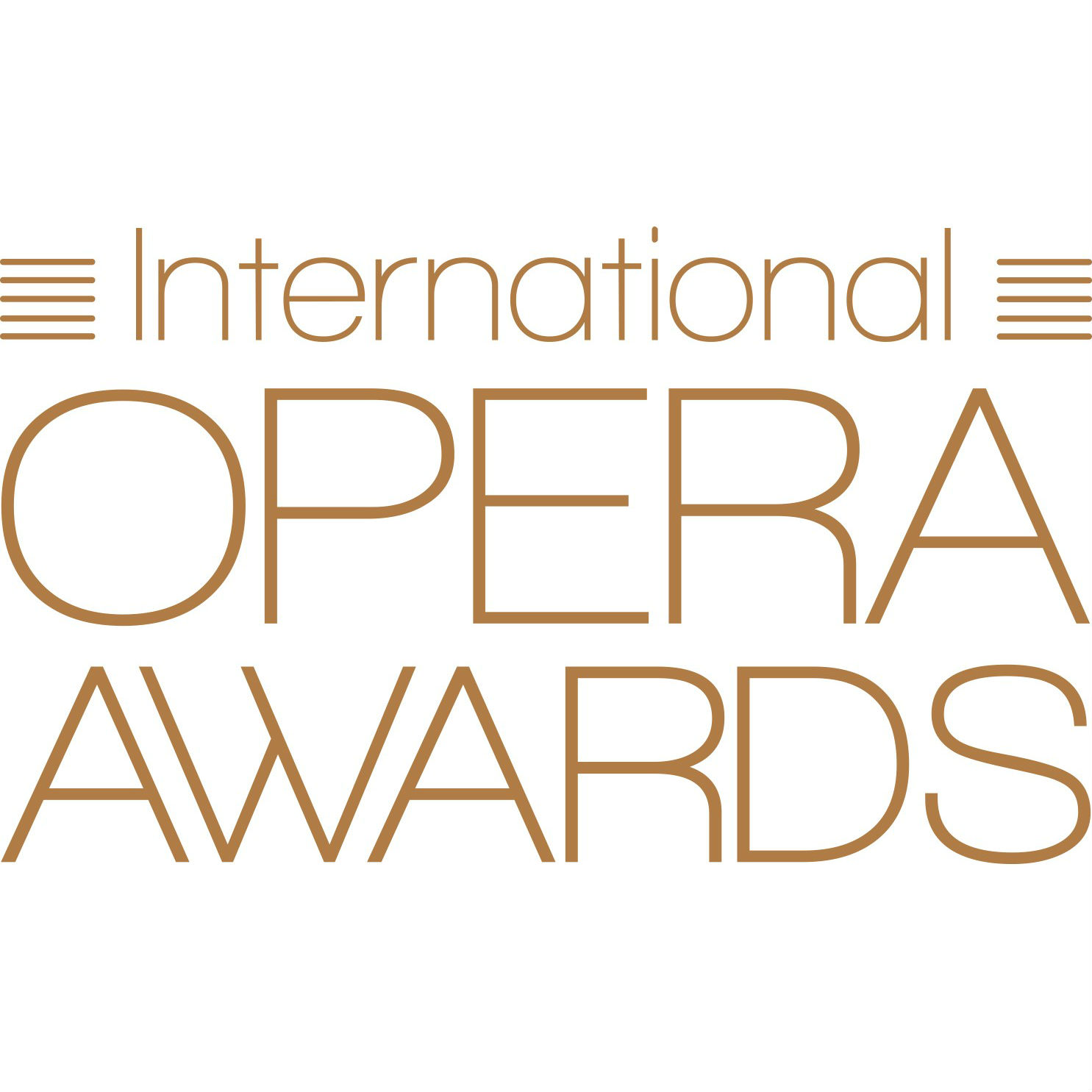
- Location: London
- Country: Great Britain
- Presented by: Harry Hyman
- First award: 2013 m.
- Website: https://www.operaawards.org

The International Opera Awards is an annual awards ceremony honouring excellence in opera around the world.

== Origins ==
The International Opera Awards was founded in 2013 by Harry Hyman, a UK businessman, philanthropist and supporter of opera, and John Allison, editor of Opera magazine. The aim of the event is to celebrate excellence in opera and to raise the profile of opera as an artform internationally.

== Award categories ==
Awards are given in approximately 20 categories each year. Nominations for all categories are open to the general public, who submit their choices via an online form. Long lists generated by this process are subsequently considered by a jury of opera critics and administrators, who announce shortlists ahead of the ceremony.

Winners are determined by secret ballot, with the exception of the Opera Magazine Readers' Award, which is decided by public vote.

== Ceremony ==
The inaugural international Opera Awards were held in London at The Hilton Hotel on Monday 22 April 2013. Subsequent ceremonies have taken place each year in April or May.

In 2015 the Awards switched from a dinner format to a theatre show, featuring performances by past winners, finalists and other prominent operatic performers. The 2015 and 2016 ceremonies took place at the Savoy Theatre in London. From 2017 to 2019 the ceremony was held at the London Coliseum and Sadler's Wells Theatre, with Orpheus Sinfonia as the orchestra of the Awards.

In 2022 the ceremony was held at the Teatro Real in Madrid. This was the first time the ceremony has been held outside the UK and the first in person since 2019, due to the COVID-19 pandemic. The 2023 Opera Awards took place at the Teatr Wielki, home to the Polish National Opera.

The host of the Awards for the past two years has been the BBC Radio 3 presenter Petroc Trelawny. The director has been Ella Marchment.

== Charitable aims ==
The Awards raise money for The Opera Awards Foundation, a charity which awards bursaries to aspiring operatic artists in financial need. Recipients include singers, conductors, accompanists, directors and ensembles. Applications are accepted annually and are open to artists in any country.

== Award winners ==
| Year | Award | Winner |
| 2025 | | |
|---|---|---|
| 2025 | Conductor | Alain Altinoglu |
| 2025 | Designer | Paolo Fantin |
| 2025 | Director | Claus Guth |
| 2025 | Equal Opportunities & Impact | The Dallas Opera: Linda and Mitch Hart Institute for Women Conductors |
| 2025 | Female Singer | Asmik Grigorian |
| 2025 | Festival | Janáček Brno Festival |
| 2025 | Leadership | Anthony Freud |
| 2025 | Lifetime Achievement | Agnes Baltsa |
| 2025 | Male Singer | Nicholas Brownlee |
| 2025 | Musical Theatre | Sunday in the Park with George (Glimmerglass Festival) |
| 2025 | New Production | The Excursions of Mr Brouček (National Theatre Brno & Staatsoper Berlin/Teatro Real/Robert Carsen) |
| 2025 | Opera Company | Theater an der Wien |
| 2025 | Philanthrophy | C. Graham Berwind III |
| 2025 | Readers' Award | Marina Rebeka |
| 2025 | Recording (Complete Opera) | Lully: Atys (Château de Versailles Spectacles) |
| 2025 | Recording (Solo Recital) | Ann Hallenberg & The Mozartists: Gluck Arias (Signum) |
| 2025 | Rediscovered Work | Galuppi: L'uomo femina (Opéra de Dijon) |
| 2025 | Rising Star | Adèle Charvet (mezzo-soprano); Hugh Cutting (countertenor) |
| 2025 | Sustainability | Teatro Real, Madrid |
| 2025 | World Premiere | Turnage/Hall: Festen (The Royal Opera) |
| 2024 | | |
| 2024 | Conductor | Simone Young |
| 2024 | Designer | Rufus Didwiszus |
| 2024 | Director | Christof Loy |
| 2024 | Equal Opportunities & Impact | Opera for Peace |
| 2024 | Female Singer | Lisette Oropesa |
| 2024 | Festival | Savonlinna Opera Festival |
| 2024 | Leadership | Christina Scheppelmann |
| 2024 | Lifetime Achievement | José van Dam |
| 2024 | Male Singer | Benjamin Bernheim |
| 2024 | New Production | Christoph Willibald Gluck: Iphigénie en Aulide - Iphigénie en Tauride , d. Dmitri Tcherniakov (Aix-en-Provence Festival) |
| 2024 | Opera Company | Komische Oper Berlin |
| 2024 | Philanthropy | Stavros Niarchos Foundation |
| 2024 | Readers' Award | Arturo Chacón Cruz |
| 2024 | Recording (Complete Opera) | Louise Bertin: Fausto (Bru Zane) |
| 2024 | Recording (Solo Recital) | Michael Spyres: In the shadows (Erato) |
| 2024 | Rediscovered Work | Antonio Salieri: Kublai Khan (Theater an der Wien) |
| 2024 | Sustainability | Finnish National Opera |
| 2024 | World Premiere | Péter Eötvös: Valuska (Hungarian State Opera) |
| 2024 | Young Singer | Justin Austin / Arnheiður Eiríksdóttir |
| 2023 | | |
| 2023 | Conductor | Antonio Pappano |
| 2023 | Designer | Lizzie Clachan |
| 2023 | Director | Barrie Kosky |
| 2023 | Equal Opportunities & Impact | La Monnaie De Munt |
| 2023 | Female Singer | Aigul Akhmetshina |
| 2023 | Festival | Festival d'Aix-en-Provence |
| 2023 | Leadership | Stephane Lissner |
| 2023 | Lifetime Achievement | Marilyn Horne |
| 2023 | Male Singer | Michael Spyres |
| 2023 | New Production | War & Peace (Bayerische Staatsoper/Tcherniakov) |
| 2023 | Opera Company | Bayerische Staatsoper |
| 2023 | Opera Readers' Award | Nadine Sierra |
| 2023 | Philanthrophy | The Sullivan Foundation |
| 2023 | Recording (Complete Opera) | Mercadante: Il Proscritto (Opera Rara) |
| 2023 | Recording (Solo Recital) | Lisette Oropesa, French Bel Canto Arias (Pentatone) |
| 2023 | Rediscovered Work | Moniuszko: Jawnuta (Teatr Wielki, Poznan) |
| 2023 | Sustainability | Dutch National Opera |
| 2023 | World Premiere | Alexander Raskatov: Animal Farm (Dutch National Opera) |
| 2023 | Young Singer | Andrzej Filonczyk |
| 2022 | | |
| 2022 | Conductor | Daniele Rustioni |
| 2022 | Designer | Michael Levine |
| 2022 | Digital Opera | Upload (Dutch National Opera) |
| 2022 | Director | Stefan Herheim |
| 2022 | Equal Opportunities & Impact | Foundation Studio (Cape Town Opera) |
| 2022 | Female Singer | Sabine Devieilhe |
| 2022 | Festival | Santa Fe Opera |
| 2022 | Leadership | Nicholas Payne |
| 2022 | Lifetime Achievement | Dame Janet Baker |
| 2022 | Male Singer | Stéphane Degout |
| 2022 | New Production | Glyndebourne: La Voix humaine/Les Mamelles de Tirésias (c. Robin Ticciati, d. Laurent Pelly) |
| 2022 | Opera Company | Lviv National Academic Opera & Ballet Theatre jointly with Odesa Opera & Ballet Theatre |
| 2022 | Readers' Award | Pene Pati |
| 2022 | Philanthropy | Aline Foriel-Destezet |
| 2022 | Recording (Complete Opera) | Offenbach: Le Voyage dans la lune (Bru Zane) |
| 2022 | Recording (Solo Recital) | Michael Spyres: Baritenor (Erato) |
| 2022 | Rediscovered Work | Dallapiccola: Ulisse (Oper Frankfurt) |
| 2022 | Rising Star | Nardus Williams (soprano) |
| 2022 | Sustainability | Gothenburg Opera |
| 2022 | World Premiere | Defoort: The Time of our Singing (La Monnaie De Munt) |
| 2020/21 | | 2020 and 2021 Awards were combined due to the effects of the COVID-19 pandemic |
| 2020/21 | Chorus | Metropolitan Opera |
| 2020/21 | Conductor | Kirill Petrenko |
| 2020/21 | Designer | Małgorzata Szczęśniak |
| 2020/21 | Director | Robert Carsen |
| 2020/21 | Education & Outreach | Birmingham Opera Company |
| 2020/21 | Female Singer | Lise Davidsen |
| 2020/21 | Festival | Salzburg Festival |
| 2020/21 | Leadership | Sir David Pountney |
| 2020/21 | Lifetime Achievement | Bernard Haitink |
| 2020/21 | Male Singer | Javier Camarena |
| 2020/21 | New Production | Nicolai Rimsky-Korsakov: The Tale of Tsar Saltan, d. Dmitri Tcherniakov (La Monnaie/De Munt) |
| 2020/21 | Newcomer | Alpesh Chauhan |
| 2020/21 | Opera Company | Teatro Real |
| 2020/21 | Opera for Peace Prize | Denyce Graves |
| 2020/21 | Opera Orchestra | Bayerische Staatsoper / Bayerisches Staatsorchester |
| 2020/21 | Philanthropy | The Martina Arroyo Foundation |
| 2020/21 | Readers' Award | Jamie Barton |
| 2020/21 | Recording (Complete Opera) | Thomas: Hamlet Opera Comique (Naxos) |
| 2020/21 | Recording (Solo Recital) | Jakub Józef Orliński: Facce d'amore (Erato) |
| 2020/21 | Rediscovered Work | Moniuszko: Paria (Poznań Opera House) |
| 2020/21 | World Premiere | Glanert: Oceane (Deutsche Oper Berlin) |
| 2020/21 | Young Singer | Vasilisa Berzhanskaya / Xabier Anduaga |
| 2019 | | |
| 2019 | Chorus | Bolshoi Opera |
| 2019 | Conductor | Marc Albrecht |
| 2019 | Designer | Rebecca Ringst |
| 2019 | Director | Katie Mitchell |
| 2019 | Education & Outreach | Umculo |
| 2019 | Female Singer | Asmik Grigorian |
| 2019 | Festival | Janáček Brno Festival |
| 2019 | Leadership | Waldemar Dąbrowski |
| 2019 | Lifetime Achievement | Leontyne Price |
| 2019 | Male Singer | Charles Castronovo |
| 2019 | New Production | Janáček: From the House of the Dead, d. Krzysztof Warlikowski (Royal Opera House) |
| 2019 | Newcomer | Maxim Emelyanychev |
| 2019 | Opera Company | Opera Vlaanderen |
| 2019 | Opera Orchestra | Royal Opera House |
| 2019 | Philanthropy | Fondation Bru |
| 2019 | Readers' Award | Sonya Yoncheva |
| 2019 | Recording (Complete Opera) | Rossini: Semiramide (Opera Rara) |
| 2019 | Recording (Solo Recital) | Stéphane Degout: Enfers (Harmonia Mundi) |
| 2019 | Rediscovered Work | Hasse: Artaserse (Pinchgut Opera) |
| 2019 | World Premiere | Kurtág: Fin de partie (Teatro alla Scala) |
| 2019 | Young Singer | Marina Viotti |
| 2018 | | |
| 2018 | Chorus | MusicAeterna |
| 2018 | Conductor | Vladimir Jurowski |
| 2018 | Designer | Paul Steinberg |
| 2018 | Director | Mariusz Treliński |
| 2018 | Education & Outreach | Opera Holland Park |
| 2018 | Female Singer | Malin Byström |
| 2018 | Male Singer | Piotr Beczała |
| 2018 | Young Singer | Wallis Giunta |
| 2018 | Festival | Festival Verdi Parma |
| 2018 | Leadership in Opera | Bernd Loebe |
| 2018 | Lifetime Achievement | Teresa Berganza |
| 2018 | New Production | Britten: Billy Budd, d. Deborah Warner (Teatro Real) |
| 2018 | Newcomer | Barbora Horáková Joly |
| 2018 | Opera Company | Bayerische Staatsoper |
| 2018 | Opera Orchestra | Teatro alla Scala |
| 2018 | Philanthropy | Annette Campbell-White |
| 2018 | Readers' Award | Pretty Yende |
| 2018 | Recording (Complete Opera) | Berlioz: Les Troyens (Erato) |
| 2018 | Recording (Solo Recital) | Véronique Gens: Visions (Alpha) |
| 2018 | Rediscovered Work | Krenek: Der Diktator; Schwergewicht; Das geheime Königreich (Oper Frankfurt) |
| 2018 | World Premiere | Brett Dean: Hamlet (Glyndebourne) |
| 2017 | | |
| 2017 | Chorus | Arnold Schoenberg Chor |
| 2017 | Conductor | Philippe Jordan |
| 2017 | Designer | Klaus Grünberg |
| 2017 | Director | Christof Loy |
| 2017 | Education & Outreach | Natalya Sats Children’s Opera Theatre, Moscow |
| 2017 | Female Singer | Anna Netrebko |
| 2017 | Male Singer | Lawrence Brownlee |
| 2017 | Young Singer | Louise Alder |
| 2017 | Festival | Wexford Festival Opera |
| 2017 | Leadership in Opera | Bernard Foccroulle |
| 2017 | Lifetime Achievement | Renata Scotto |
| 2017 | New Production | Saariaho: L’amour de loin, d. Robert Lepage (Metropolitan Opera) |
| 2017 | Newcomer | Lorenzo Viotti (Conductor) |
| 2017 | Opera Company | Opéra de Lyon |
| 2017 | Readers' Award | Juan Diego Flórez |
| 2017 | Philanthropy | FEDORA: The European Circle of Philanthropists of Opera and Ballet |
| 2017 | Recording (Complete Opera) | Pique Dame (BR Klassik) |
| 2017 | Recording (Solo Recital) | Pretty Yende: A Journey (Sony) |
| 2017 | Rediscovered Work | Żeleński: Goplana (Polish National Opera) |
| 2017 | Special Award in Memoriam | Alberto Zedda |
| 2017 | World Premiere | Thomas Adès: The Exterminating Angel (Salzburg Festival) |
| 2016 | | |
| 2016 | Accessibility | The Opera Platform |
| 2016 | CD (Complete Opera) | Donizetti: Les martyrs, Opera Rara |
| 2016 | CD (Operatic Recital) | Ann Hallenberg: Agrippina, Deutsche Harmonia Mundi |
| 2016 | Chorus | English National Opera Chorus |
| 2016 | Conductor | Gianandrea Noseda |
| 2016 | Designer | Vicki Mortimer |
| 2016 | Director | Laurent Pelly |
| 2016 | DVD | Rimsky-Korsakov: The Tsar's Bride, Bel Air Classiques |
| 2016 | Female Singer | Mariella Devia |
| 2016 | Male Singer | Gregory Kunde |
| 2016 | Young Female Singer | Asmik Grigorian |
| 2016 | Young Male Singer | Stanislas de Barbeyrac |
| 2016 | Festival | Glyndebourne Festival Opera |
| 2016 | Lifetime Achievement | Brigitte Fassbaender |
| 2016 | New Production | Britten: Peter Grimes, Theater an der Wien (Vienna) |
| 2016 | Opera Company | Dutch National Opera |
| 2016 | Philanthropist/Sponsor | Bill & Judy Bollinger, Christine Collins |
| 2016 | Rediscovered Work | Offenbach: Le roi Carotte, Opéra de Lyon |
| 2016 | World Premiere | Jennifer Higdon: Cold Mountain, Santa Fe Opera |
| 2016 | Young Conductor | Giacomo Sagripanti |
| 2016 | Young Director | Fabio Ceresa |
| 2016 | Readers’ Award | Ermonela Jaho |
| 2015 | | |
| 2015 | Accessibility | Den Norske Opera |
| 2015 | CD (Complete Opera) | Offenbach: Fantasio, Opera Rara |
| 2015 | CD (Operatic Recital) | Anna Bonitatibus: Semiramide: La Signora Regale, Deutsche Harmonia Mundi |
| 2015 | Chorus | Welsh National Opera Chorus |
| 2015 | Conductor | Semyon Bychkov |
| 2015 | Designer | Es Devlin |
| 2015 | Director | Richard Jones |
| 2015 | DVD | Strauss: Elektra, Bel Air Classiques |
| 2015 | Female Singer | Anja Harteros |
| 2015 | Male Singer | Christian Gerhaher |
| 2015 | Young Singer | Justina Gringyte |
| 2015 | Festival | Bregenzer Festspiele |
| 2015 | Lifetime Achievement | Speight Jenkins |
| 2015 | Newcomer | Lotte de Beer |
| 2015 | New Production | Mussorgsky: Khovanskygate, Birmingham Opera Company |
| 2015 | Opera Company | Komische Oper Berlin |
| 2015 | Philanthropist/Sponsor | Ann Ziff (Bill and Ann Ziff Foundation) |
| 2015 | Readers’ Award | Aleksandra Kurzak |
| 2015 | Readers’ Award | Jonas Kaufmann |
| 2015 | Rediscovered Work | Rossini: Aureliano in Palmira, Rossini Opera Festival (Pesaro) |
| 2015 | Anniversary Production (Strauss) | Die Frau ohne Schatten, Royal Opera House (London) |
| 2015 | World Premiere | Philippe Boesmans: Au monde, La Monnaie (Bruxelles) |
| 2014 | | |
| 2014 | Accessibility | Teatro Sociale di Como |
| 2014 | Anniversary Production (Britten) | Peter Grimes on the beach (Aldeburgh Festival) |
| 2014 | Anniversary Production (Verdi) | Verdi trilogy – La battaglia di Legnano, I due Foscari, I Lombardi (Hamburg Staatsoper) |
| 2014 | Anniversary Production (Wagner) | Parsifal (Vlaamse Opera) |
| 2014 | CD (Complete Opera) | Otello (Chicago Symphony Orchestra Resound) |
| 2014 | CD (Operatic Recital) | Ann Hallenberg – Hidden Handel (Naïve) |
| 2014 | Chorus | Bayreuth Festival |
| 2014 | Conductor | Kirill Petrenko |
| 2014 | Designer | Paul Brown |
| 2014 | Director | Barrie Kosky |
| 2014 | DVD | David et Jonathas (Bel Air Classiques) |
| 2014 | Female Singer | Diana Damrau |
| 2014 | Male Singer | Stuart Skelton |
| 2014 | Young Singer | Jamie Barton |
| 2014 | Festival | Aix-en-Provence Festival |
| 2014 | Lifetime Achievement | Gerard Mortier |
| 2014 | New Production | Norma, p. Moshe Leiser and Patrice Caurier (Salzburg Festival) |
| 2014 | Opera Company | Oper Zürich |
| 2014 | Philanthropist/Sponsor | Edgar Foster Daniels |
| 2014 | Readers’ Award | Joseph Calleja |
| 2014 | Rediscovered Work | Cristina, regina di Svezia (Foroni), Wexford Festival |
| 2014 | World Premiere | The Merchant of Venice (André Tchaikowsky), Bregenz Festival |
| 2013 | | |
| 2013 | Accessibility | Metropolitan Opera |
| 2013 | CD (Complete Opera) | Alessandro (Handel), c. George Petrou (Decca) |
| 2013 | CD (Operatic Recital) | Christian Gerhaher: Romantic Arias (Sony) |
| 2013 | Chorus | Cape Town Opera |
| 2013 | Conductor | Antonio Pappano |
| 2013 | Designer (costumes) | Buki Shiff |
| 2013 | Designer (sets) | Antony McDonald |
| 2013 | Designer (lighting) | Paule Constable |
| 2013 | Director | Dmitri Tcherniakov |
| 2013 | DVD | Il trittico, Royal Opera, p. Richard Jones, c. Antonio Pappano (Opus Arte) |
| 2013 | Female Singer | Nina Stemme |
| 2013 | Male Singer | Jonas Kaufmann |
| 2013 | Young Singer | Sophie Bevan |
| 2013 | Festival | Salzburg Festival |
| 2013 | Newcomer (conductor or director) | Daniele Rustioni |
| 2013 | New Production | The Legend of the Invisible City of Kitezh, p. and d. Dmitri Tcherniakov (Netherlands Opera) |
| 2013 | Opera Company | Oper Frankfurt |
| 2013 | Opera Orchestra | Metropolitan Opera |
| 2013 | Philanthropist/Sponsor | Sir Peter Moores |
| 2013 | Rediscovered Work | David et Jonathas (Charpentier), Les Arts Florissants |
| 2013 | World Premiere | Written on Skin (Benjamin), Aix-en-Provence Festival |
