= Buki =

Buki may refer to:

- Buki (musical instrument), a brass instrument from Georgia
- Buki, the acrophonic name of the letter Be (Cyrillic) in the old Russian alphabet

== People ==
- Ailuene Buki, Hawaiian name of John E. Bush (Hawaii politician)
- Buki Akib, British actress and fashion designer
- Buki Shiff is an Israeli opera and theatre costume and set designer

== See also ==
- Bukki, a Biblical character
- Buke (disambiguation)
- Buky
