= Le roi l'a dit =

Opéra comique in three acts by Léo Delibes

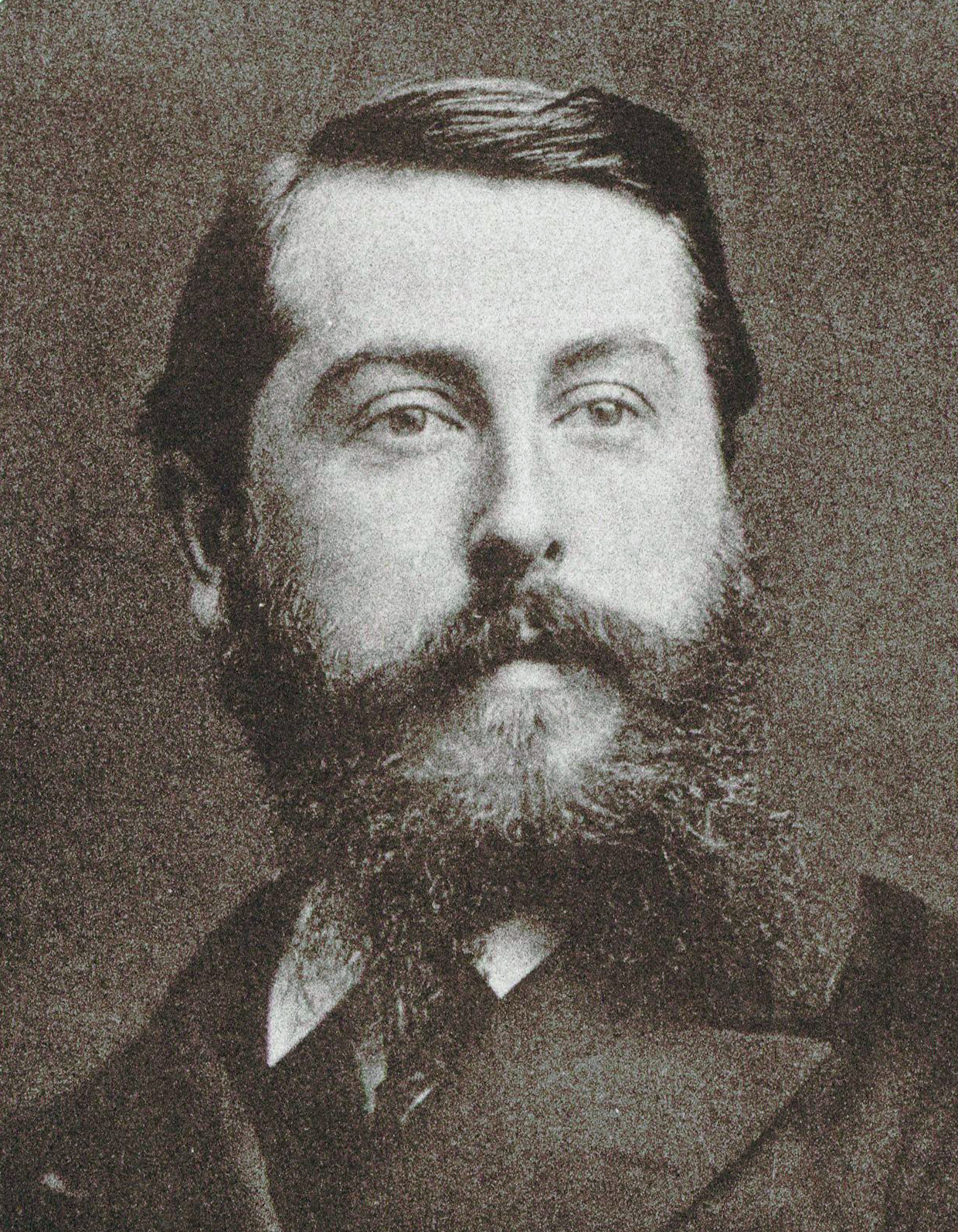
Léo Delibes

Le roi l'a dit (The King Has Spoken) is an opéra comique in three acts by Léo Delibes to a French libretto by Edmond Gondinet. It is a lively comedy, remarkably requiring 14 singers – six men and eight women. The libretto had first been offered in 1871 to Offenbach. The title also went through various permutations (Le Talon rouge, Si le Roi le savait, Le Roi le sait) before settling on its final name. The 1885 revival brought further modifications to the libretto.

== Performance history ==
The opera was first performed on 24 May 1873 at the Opéra-Comique in Paris, and was seen there until 1900, totalling 79 performances there. The 1885 production included Lucien Fugère, Molé-Truffier and Barnolt and was conducted by Jules Danbé. The revival on 23 March 1898 was in a 2-act version by Philippe Gille. A series of performances took place at the Trianon Lyrique, Paris in December 1911.

It was seen in Antwerp in 1873, Vienna, Carlsruhe and Prague in 1874, Riga in 1876, and in Budapest, Berlin and Copenhagen in 1877, and was occasionally revived in the 20th century. On 20 December 1958, French Radio recorded Le roi l'a dit with soloists, chorus and the Orchestre Radio Lyrique de la RTF conducted by André Girard.

It was not staged in France between 1914 and 1959, when it was revived in Bordeaux under the baton of Roger Gayral, with a cast including Christine Harbell, Hélène Régelly, Louis Noguéra and André Dran, a well-received production which transferred to Paris.

Delibes's Le roi l'a dit would later serve as the basis for a ballet titled L'ordre du Roi (The King's Command) created by the renowned choreographer Marius Petipa to the music of Albert Vizentini. L'ordre du Roi was staged for the Imperial Ballet of St. Petersburg, Russia and first presented for the benefit performance of the ballerina Virginia Zucchi on 26 February [O.S. 14 February] 1886. Edmund Gondinet's libretto was revised by changing the setting from Louis XIV's France to 16th century Spain.

== Roles ==
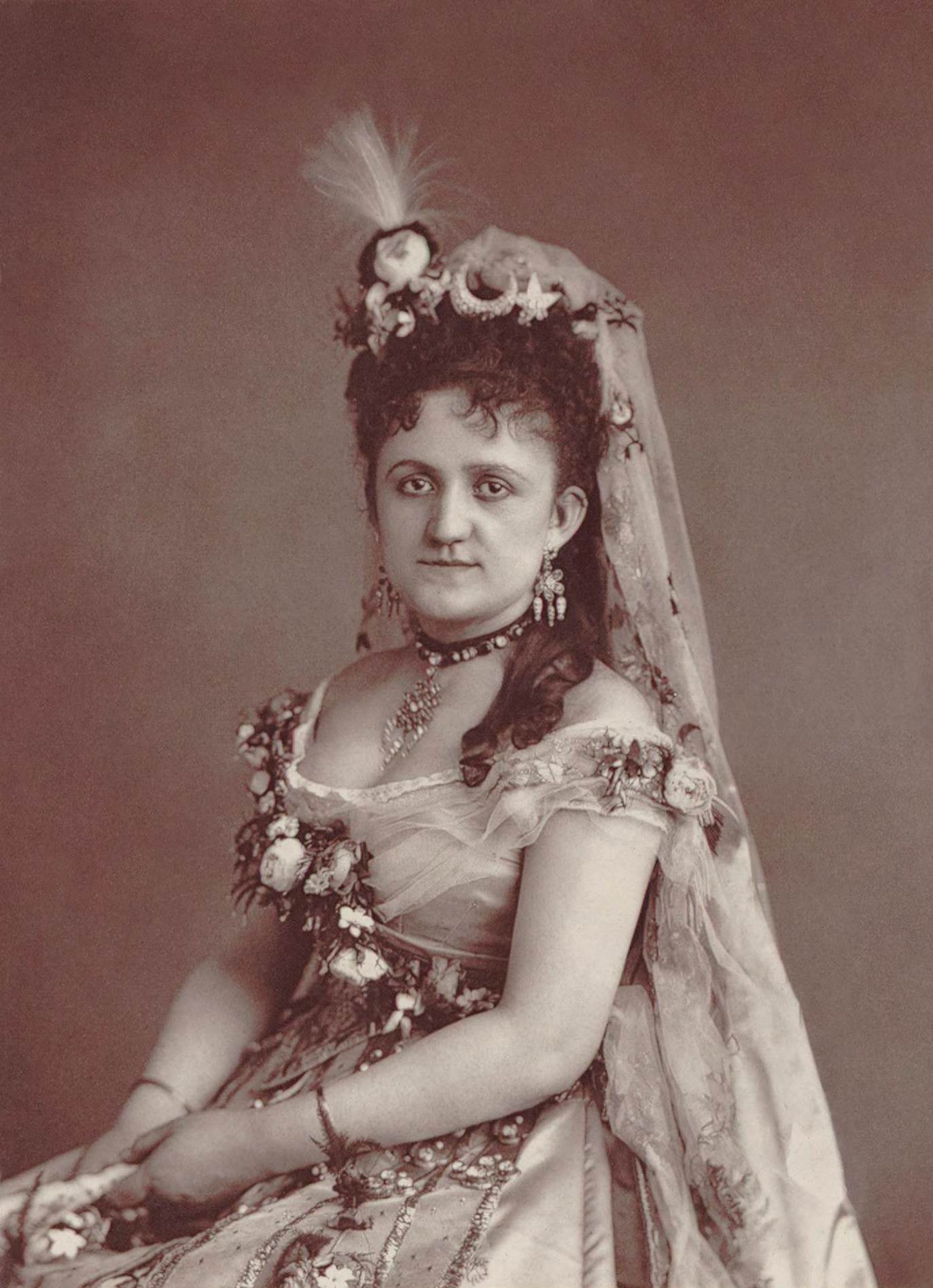
Marguerite Priola as Javotte

Role	Voice type	Premiere cast, 24 May 1873 (Conductor: Adolphe Deloffre)
Javotte	soprano	Marguerite Priola
Benoit	tenor	Paul Lhérie
Marquis de Moncontour	bass	Ismaël
Marquise de Moncontour	mezzo-soprano	Antoinette-Jeanne Révilly
Marquis de Florembelle	soprano (en travesti) or tenor	Ganetti
Marquis de la Bleuette	mezzo-soprano (en travesti) or baryton-martin	Julia Reine
Chimène	soprano	J Nadaud
Agathe	soprano	Guillot
Philomèle	soprano	Marguérite Chapuy
Miton	tenor	Charles-Louis Sainte-Foy
Gautru	bass	Joseph Thierry
Angélique	soprano	Thibault
Baron de Merlussac	bass	François Bernard
Pacôme	tenor	Barnolt
Chorus: servants, courtiers, tradespeople.

== Synopsis ==
Time: the reign of Louis XIV

=== Act 1 ===
The Marquis de Moncontour has long wished to be presented to King Louis XIV, and, having recently caught the escaped parrot of Mme de Maintenon, he is at last to have his wish fulfilled. In preparation for his audience he tries to learn the latest way of bowing, and the Marquise, her four daughters and Javotte, the maid, assist him. The old gentleman finally succeeds in making his bow to his own satisfaction, and he is put into a litter, and sent off.

When they are gone, Benoit, a young peasant, comes to see Javotte, his sweetheart. He wishes to enter the Marquis’ service. Javotte thinks him too awkward, but promises to ask Miton, a dancing-master, who enters as Benoit disappears. He has instructed the graceful Javotte in all the graces of the noble world, and when he rehearses the steps and tricks of his art with her, he is so delighted that he pronounces her manners worthy of a princess. When Javotte tells him that she loves a peasant, he is disgusted and sends her packing. His real pupils, the four daughters of the Marquis enter, and while the lesson goes on, Miton hands a billet-doux from some lover to each of them. The two elder, Agatha and Chimène, are just in the act of reading theirs, when they hear a serenade outside, and shortly the two lovers are in the room, having slipped in through the window. The Marquis Flarembel and his friend, the Marquis de la Bluette are just making an ardent declaration of love, when Mme la Marquise enters to present to her elder daughters the two men she has chosen for them. The young men hide behind the ample dresses of the young ladies, and all begin to sing with great zeal, Miton beating the measure, so that some time elapses, before the Marquise speaks. Her words excite terror, and the girls retreat with their lovers and receive the two elderly suitors, Baron de Merlussac and Gautru, a rich old financier, with coolness and refusal of their costly gifts. When the suitors are gone, the two young strangers are found out and the angry mother decides at once to send her daughters to a convent, which they will only be able to leave on their wedding-day.

When they have gone, the old Marquis returns from his audience with the King. His Majesty had been so peremptory in his questioning about the Marquis' son and heir, that the Marquis lost all presence of mind, and promised to present his son to Court on the King's demand. The only question now is where to find a son, as the Marquis has only four daughters! Miton presents Benoit to the parents, engaging himself to drill the peasant into a true cavalier. Benoit takes readily to his new position; he is fitted out and when the merchants come, offering their best in cloth and finery, he treats them with an insolence worthy of the proudest seigneur. He even turns from his sweetheart Javotte.

=== Act 2 ===
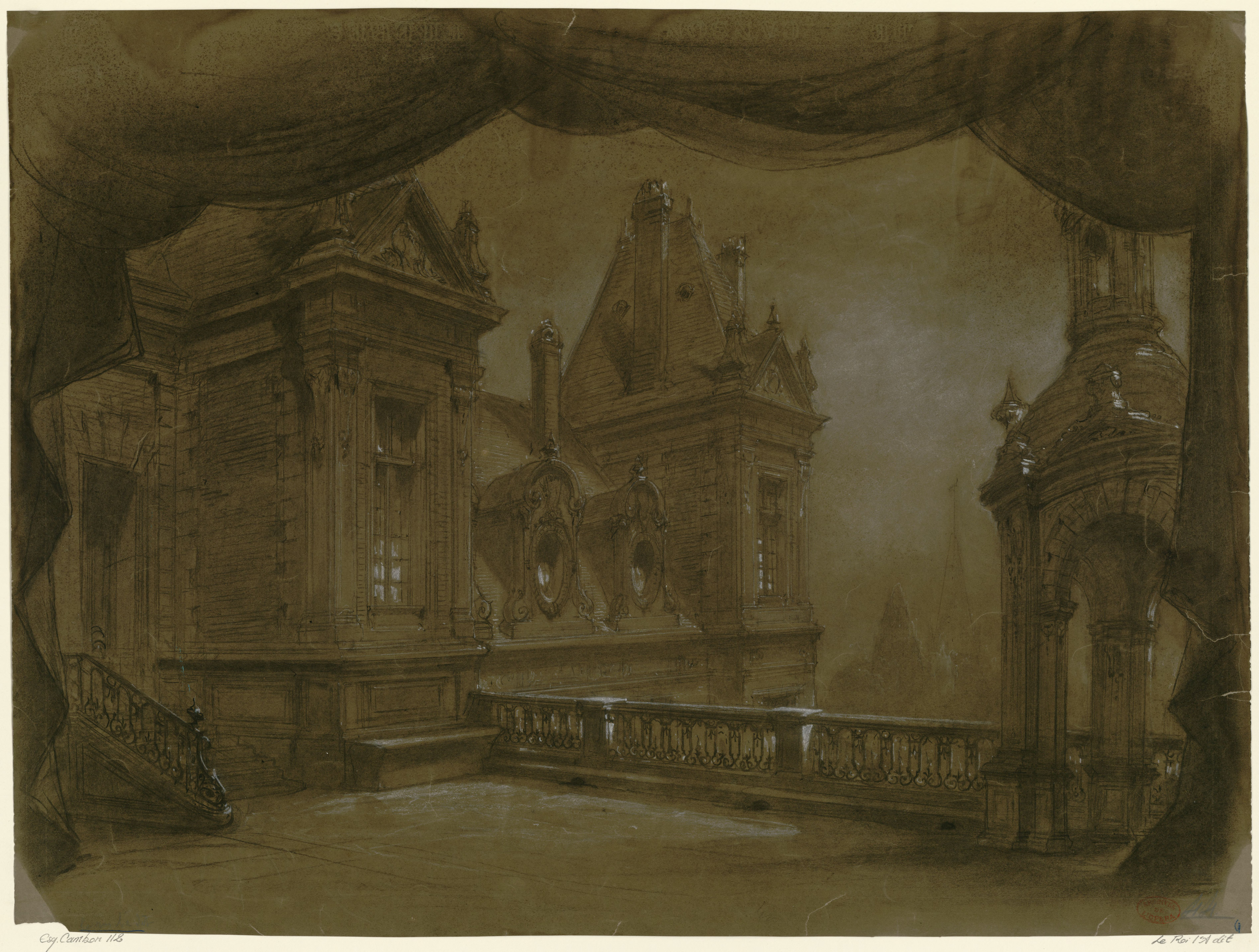
Set design by Charles-Antoine Cambon

Benoit, dressed like a fine cavalier, gives a masked ball in his father's gardens. Half Versailles is invited, but he has mistakenly invited many people from the Court Almanac who have long been dead. Those who do appear seem to him to be very insipid, and wanting some friends with whom he can enjoy himself, the useful Miton presents the Marquis de la Bluette and de Flarembel, who are delighted to make the acquaintance of their sweethearts' brother.

Benoit learns from them that he has four charming sisters, who have been sent to a convent, and he at once promises to assist his new friends. Meanwhile Javotte appears disguised as an oriental queen and Benoit makes love to her, but is amazed when she takes off her mask, and he recognizes Javotte. She laughingly turns away from him, when the youth's new parents appear, to reproach him with his levity. Benoit rushes away, telling the Marquis that he intends to visit his sisters in the convent. Miton tries in vain to recall him. Then the old suitors of Agathe and Chimène appear, to complain that their deceased wife and grandmother were invited, and while the Marquis explains his son's mistake, the four daughters rush in, liberated by their lovers and their unknown brother, whom they greet with a fondness very shocking to the old marchioness. The elderly suitors withdraw, swearing to take vengeance on the inopportune brother.

=== Act 3 ===
Benoit appears in his father's house after having spent the night amongst gay companions and met Gautru and de Merlussac successively, who have both fought him and believe they have killed him – Benoit having feigned to be dead on the spot. When the old Marquis enters, he is astonished to receive two letters of condolence from his daughter's suitors. Miton appears in mourning, explaining that Mme de Maintenon's visit being expected, they must all wear dark colours as she prefers these. Meanwhile Benoit has met Javotte and declared his undiminished love and he at once asks his father to give him Javotte as his wife, threatening to reveal the Marquis' deceit to the King if his request is not granted. In this dilemma, help comes in the persons of the two young Marquises, who present their King's condolences to old Moncontour. This gentleman hears to his great relief, that his son is supposed to have fallen in a duel, and so he is disposed of. Nobody is happier than Javotte, who now claims Benoit for her own, while the Marquis, who receives a Duke's title from the King in compensation for his loss, gladly gives his two elder daughters to their young and noble lovers.

The girls, well aware that they owe their happiness to their adopted brother, are glad to provide him with ample means for his marriage with Javotte, and the opera ends to everybody's satisfaction.

== Recordings ==
- Christiane Jacquin, soprano. Michel Sénéchal Choeurs Radio Lyrique Paris, Orchestre Radio Lyrique Paris, Jules Gressier 1956
