= De Musset (surname) =

De Musset is a French surname. Notable people with the surname include:

- Alfred de Musset (1810–1857), French writer
- Paul de Musset (1804–1880), French writer
