= Renato Zanettovich =

Italian violinist and teacher (1921–2021)

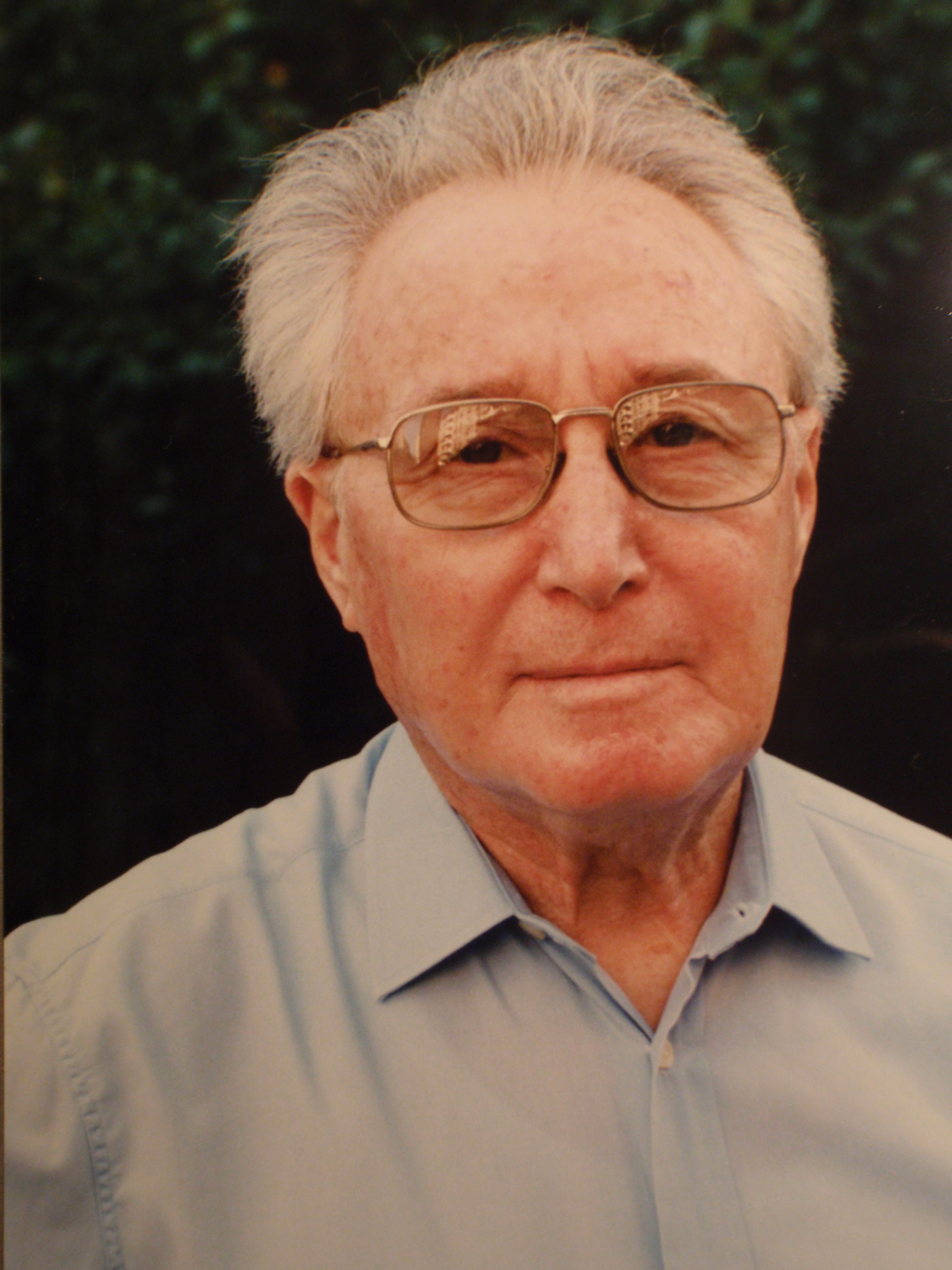
- Zanettovich in 1985

Background information
- Born: 28 July 1921; Trieste, Italy
- Died: 29 October 2021 (aged 100) Trieste, Italy
- Genres: classical music
- Instrument: Violin
- Years active: 1933–2003
- Label: Deutsche Grammophon

Renato Zannetovich (28 July 1921 – 29 October 2021) was an Italian violinist and teacher.

== Biography ==
Zanettovich was born in Trieste. While still a student of Umberto Nigri in 1933, he founded the Trieste Trio together with cellist Libero Lana and pianist Dario de Rosa.

He taught violin at the "C. Monteverdi" Conservatory in Bolzano from 1950 to 1955, at the "G. Tartini" Conservatory in Trieste from 1955 to 1970 and at the "B. Marcello" Conservatory in Venice from 1970 to 1986. He also held several courses and masterclasses in Italy and abroad: at the Music School of Fiesole (from 1981 to 2003), at the Accademia Musicale Chigiana in Siena and at the Superior School of Chamber Music of the Trieste Trio in Duino (at the Collegio of the United World of the Adriatic). In 2007 Zanettovich was the recipient of a "President of the Republic Award" of the National Academy of Santa Cecilia in Italy. The prize was presented by the then President of the Italian Republic, Giorgio Napolitano.

Zanettovich died in Trieste at the age of 100 on 29 October 2021, in his sleep. He was the father of the composer Daniele Zanettovich.
