= Orpheus Sinfonia =

London-based orchestra for young musicians

The Orpheus Sinfonia is an orchestra based in London. Established in 2009, it is composed of freelance young musicians under the artistic direction of conductor Thomas Carroll.

Orpheus Sinfonia is the resident orchestra at St George's Hanover Square in London and performs at other venues across London and the UK.

The orchestra performed in a concert in St George’s Chapel for the Queen’s 2022 Platinum Jubilee Celebrations. They released an album on Signum Classics in 2013.

They have performed at The International Opera Awards and in 2022 performed live for the world premiere of Avatar: Way of Water.

Orpheus Sinfonia's patrons are Sir Antonio Pappano and Dame Judi Dench.

== Orpheus Sinfonia Foundation Programme ==
In 2023 Orpheus announced the launch of its Orpheus Sinfonia Foundation Programme designed to give recent music graduates the first steps into professional careers.
