= One Medical Group =

English primary care provider based in Leeds

- Industry: Primary care
- Founded: 2004
- Headquarters: Leeds, England, United Kingdom
- Key people: Rachel Beverley-Stevenson (CEO)

One Medical Group is an English primary care provider based in Leeds. Rachel Beverley-Stevenson co-founded the group in 2004 and serves as its CEO.

== Operations history ==
It established an office in Westminster in 2014 when it won a contract to run a new NHS Urgent Care Centre in Bracknell. The company won a contract in April 2015 to run Derby Urgent Care Centre. It has a £42m healthcare property portfolio with 14 premises and 16 primary care centres. Medicx Fund bought the company in June 2018 for £63.8 million.

== Purpose ==
The group's chief executive Rachel Beverley-Stevenson was reported as saying that workforce supply and service demand were the key issues facing the National Health Service (NHS) in the 2015 United Kingdom general election, but they had not been tackled by any political party.

Beverley-Stevenson pointed out that while politicians had claimed they would fund 8,000 new doctors and so many new nurses’, it takes 10 years to train a GP and a number of years to train a really good nurse. It had become much more attractive to GPs and nurses to be a locum worker. She also highlighted the battle against rising demand, saying that as many as 30% of patients access the wrong services.
