= Buke =

Buke may refer to:

- Buke (China), the practice of taking extra classes in secondary school
- Buke (Japan), a social class
- Buke, old variant of the word for "book"
- Buke, a district in Altenbeken, Germany
- Büke, a Turkish given name
- Buké, a talk show on the Hungarian TV channel Hír TV

== See also ==
- Buke and Gase, American musical duo
- Bûke baranê, a type of Kurdish doll
- Buki (disambiguation)
