= Fabio Ceresa =

Italian opera director and librettist

Fabio Ceresa (born 21 August 1981) is an Italian opera director and librettist.

== Opera productions ==
- L'Orfeo, immagini di una lontananza, by Luigi Rossi / Daniela Terranova 2012, Festival della Valle d'Itria
- Giovanna d'Arco, by Giuseppe Verdi, 2013, Festival della Valle d'Itria
- Madama Butterfly, by Giacomo Puccini, 2014 Teatro Comunale Florence
- Tosca, by Giacomo Puccini, 2014, Teatro Coccia, Novara
- Guglielmo Ratcliff, by Pietro Mascagni, 2015, Wexford Festival Opera
- Madama Butterfly, by Giacomo Puccini, 2015, Opera di Firenze
- I puritani, by Vincenzo Bellini, 2015, Teatro Regio di Torino
- Madama Butterfly, by Giacomo Puccini, 2015, Teatro Petruzzelli di Bari
- I puritani, by Vincenzo Bellini, 2015, Opera di Firenze
- Maria de Rudenz, by Gaetano Donizetti, 2016, Wexford Festival Opera
- Rigoletto, by Giuseppe Verdi, 2016, Opernhaus Kiel
- Orlando finto pazzo, by Antonio Vivaldi, 2016, Korea National Opera
- Madama Butterfly, by Giacomo Puccini, 2022, Opéra de Rennes

== Librettos ==
- Re tuono (King Thunder), by Daniela Terranova, 2010 (Suvini Zerboni)
- Mannaggia a Bubbà! (Damn Bubbà!) by Daniela Terranova, 2011 (Suvini Zerboni)
- L'Orfeo, immagini di una lontananza (Orfeo, Images of a Remoteness), by Luigi Rossi / Daniela Terranova, 2012, Festival della Valle d'Itria (Suvini Zerboni)
- Le falene (The Moths), by Daniela Terranova, 2013, Festival della Valle d'Itria (Suvini Zerboni)
- Il vascello incantato (The Magic Vessel), by Marco Taralli, 2007, Teatro Carlo Felice di Genova; 2013, Teatro Comunale di Bologna (Sonzogno)
- Marco Polo, by Daniele Zanettovich, 2013, Croatian National Theatre, Rijeka (Edizioni Musicali Pizzicato)
- La ciociara (Two Women), by Marco Tutino, 2015, San Francisco Opera (Sonzogno)
- ’’Il Giudizio di Paride’’ by Paolo Marchettini, 2025 , Teatro Pergolesi, Jesi.

== Awards ==
- International Opera Award 2016: Best Young Director
