= Fantasio (Offenbach) =

1872 opéra comique by Jacques Offenbach

Jacques Offenbach by Nadar, c. 1860s

Fantasio is an 1872 opéra comique in 3 acts, 4 tableaux, with music by Jacques Offenbach. The French libretto by Paul de Musset was closely based on the 1834 play of the same name by his brother Alfred de Musset. The opera found little success in Offenbach's lifetime, was occasionally revived until the preparation of a critical edition in the 2000s.

== Background ==
The Musset play was published in the Revue des deux Mondes in 1834 and first performed at the Comédie-Française, Paris in 1866 where it was seen 30 times. Two "new" works were scheduled for the Salle Favart (Opéra-Comique) in 1872 as it regained momentum after the Franco-Prussian War and the Commune; Fantasio by Offenbach and les Noces de Figaro, Mozart's opera after Beaumarchais, which entered the Opéra Comique repertoire that February.

The choice of Fantasio as an operatic subject was considered a bold one, as Alfred de Musset's comedy had not seen great success at the Comédie-Française as a play. Rehearsals for the opera had begun in early 1870, but the Franco-Prussian War and the aftermath of defeat had delayed production for two years. At first the distribution was intended to be Capoul as a tenor Fantasio, Couderc as the Prince, Potel as Marinoni, Gailhard as Spark, Mlle Dalti as Elsbeth and Moisset as the page. However, at the premiere, two years on, only Moisset and Potel remained in their roles; Galli-Marié took over the title role, now a mezzo-soprano, Ismaël took over as the Prince, Melchissédec Marinoni, and Marguerite Priola Elsbeth.

Since his early successes in Paris, Offenbach had been the target of many vicious attacks in the press, and these had intensified during the Franco-Prussian War. Even Bizet was reduced to attacking the "infernal Offenbach", who had Boule de neige and Le roi Carotte premiered in the weeks prior to Fantasio. With Fantasio the criticism of wanting to conquer the Opéra-Comique was added to previous attacks. Yon argues that Offenbach's sensitivity to criticism was also due to his identification with the title character of Fantasio – the bitter clown.

Offenbach was heartbroken when the opera was taken off and wrote a letter of complaint to the director of the Opéra-Comique, Camille du Locle. He later re-used the chorus of students from the first act of Fantasio in The Tales of Hoffmann, where it becomes the student chorus at the end of that opera's first act, and the voice of Antonia's mother in Hoffmann enters with a theme from the overture of Fantasio.

The work is dedicated to Eduard Hanslick.

== Performance history ==
After its premiere at the Opéra-Comique (where it was performed ten times before being dropped from the repertoire), Fantasio was produced at the Theater an der Wien on 21 February 1872, and also seen in Graz and Prague in October 1872, and Berlin in 1873. A revival in a new version was mounted in Magdeburg in June 1927 as Der Narr der Prinzessin.

Radio Hamburg, using a score from Bote & Bock based on the Vienna version, broadcast Fantasio in the late 1950s. A production was mounted as part of the 1987 Carpentras Offenbach Festival.

It was revived in October 2000 at the Opéra de Rennes in a version reassembled by Jean-Christophe Keck, and conducted by Claude Schnitzler, in a production by Vincent Vittoz, which toured to Tours, Nantes and Angers. Martial Defontaine (tenor) was Fantasio and Iane Rouleau sang Elsbeth. The opera was also performed at the summer festival of Opernbühne Bad Aibling in 2003, with Johann Winzer (tenor) as Fantasio and Uta Bodensohn as Elsbeth. A Suite Orchestrale from the opera was performed at the Opéra-Comique in December 2009.

Fantasio was performed in concert by Opera Rara with the Orchestra of the Age of Enlightenment conducted by Sir Mark Elder, at the Royal Festival Hall, London on 15 December 2013, with Sarah Connolly (Fantasio), Brenda Rae (Elsbeth), Victoria Simmonds (Flamel), Russell Braun (Le Prince), Neal Davies (Sparck) and Brindley Sherratt (Le Roi) and a recording with the same cast was issued in 2014. The first staged performance of the Keck critical edition was at the Staatstheater in Karlsruhe in December 2014, conducted by Andreas Schuller.

Keck argues that one reason for the neglect of Fantasio was that it has been difficult to locate a performing edition; only a vocal score was published at the time of the premiere, along with a corrupt and re-orchestrated German version. Keck's researches have assembled many difficult to access manuscripts for a projected critical edition (Offenbach Edition Keck – OEK), leading to his claim that Fantasio is a rich and rounded masterpiece by the composer, and an important step towards his opera The Tales of Hoffmann.

A new production of Fantasio by the Opéra-Comique was presented at the Théâtre du Châtelet, Paris, in February 2017 conducted by Laurent Campellone with Marianne Crebassa in the title role, with the intention of touring to Rouen, Montpellier and Zagreb. It was filmed for Medici TV and the same production was seen in Geneva in 2017, and at the Opéra Comédie, Montpellier in December 2018 and January 2019 with the title role played by Rihab Chaieb under the musical direction of Pierre Dumoussaud, and returned to the Opéra Comique (Salle Favart) in December 2023. Opera Zuid mounted the first Dutch performances in May and June 2019 touring the Netherlands, and finishing in Cologne.

In an English version by Jeremy Sams, the work was seen at the 2019 Garsington festival, conducted by Justin Doyle, with Hanna Hipp as Fantasio and Jennifer France as Elsbeth.

== Roles ==
Roles, voice types, premiere cast
Role	Voice type	Premiere cast, 18 January 1872 Conductor: Adolphe Deloffre
Fantasio, a student	mezzo-soprano	Galli-Marié
The King of Bavaria	bass	Bernard
The princess Elsbeth, his daughter	soprano	Marguerite Priola
The Prince of Mantua	baritone	Ismaël
Marinoni, the prince's aide-de-camp	tenor	Potel
Flamel, page of Elsbeth	mezzo-soprano	Gabrielle Moisset
Spark, a student	bass-baritone	Léon Melchissédec
Facio, a student	tenor	Idrac
Max, a student	tenor	Mennesson
Hartmann, a student	bass	Julien
Chorus: Ladies and gentlemen of the court, citizens, students

== Synopsis ==
=== Act 1 ===
A public square at dusk; palace gates and a terrace on one side, on the other a tavern and a tailor's shop

Townspeople sing joyfully of the peace that will follow the imminent wedding of the prince of Mantua and the princess of Bavaria. Young people look forward to songs and dancing, and a group of prisoners released by the King celebrate. A group of impoverished students, Spark, Hartmann and Facio, enter hoping also to share in some fun while contemptuous of the townspeople. The King and his guards emerge from the palace. The King announces the arrival of the prince of Mantua to wed his daughter Elsbeth and encourages the celebration. A courtier explains that Elsbeth is grieving on the death of the court jester of whom she was fond. Marinoni, the prince of Mantua's aide-de-camp, enquires about the festivities and the princess, but is mocked by the students. Fantasio enters and sings a ballad to the moon. The page of Elsbeth enters to tell the students to keep their voices down as they will disturb the princess; they enter the tavern. Elsbeth sings of her wonder at the change in her life, but Fantasio enters unseen and asks her if she is really in love – with a complete stranger. Elsbeth, startled, leaves repeating Fantasio's words. When Spark joins his friend Fantasio talks extravagantly of his feelings. Soon the funeral cortege of court jester St Jean passes by and Fantasio has the idea to take the appearance of the jester to gain access to the princess, and he and Spark enter the nearby tailor's shop to get the costume. This will also help him avoid being arrested for his debts by the police. The fatuous prince of Mantua and his aide Marinoni enter, and the prince, wanting to discover the real thoughts and feelings of his future wife determines to dress as a servant to find out; he and Marinoni exit to exchange their clothes. The students come in singing and Fantasio re-appears dressed as the old jester. Two sentries mistakenly let him into the palace grounds and he looks forward to his adventure and to meeting Elsbeth again.

=== Act 2 ===
Palace gardens

Elsbeth, her page and the ladies of the court are walking in the palace grounds. She does not want to talk about her future marriage but of the poor jester whom she so admired. She sends the others away but then discovers Fantasio who amuses her with his banter about the flowers; she is intrigued by the unknown jester. The king, the prince and Marinoni (disguised as each other) enter. Elsbeth is not impressed by the aide-de-camp's song. When she and Fantasio are alone he casts more doubt in her mind about going ahead with the liaison with the prince, and she longs for a reason to delay the union. The court enter and while Marinoni (as the prince) sings her a pompous song in praise of beauty Fantasio climbs a tree and with a stick lifts the wig from the head of the false prince. The marriage of the Mantuan prince is immediately compromised but Fantasio is taken away.

=== Act 3 ===
1st tableau – a prison

Fantasio is delighted to have wrecked the wedding plans, but when Elsbeth visits him in his prison cell she says she must go ahead with the marriage to the prince of Mantua to avoid a diplomatic quarrel and help bring peace between the two kingdoms. Fantasio takes off all his disguise and sings his ballad from act 1. Hearing this romance she is moved, decides to help him elude the guards – who expect to see a hump-back jester, but not a young man – and gives him a key to the gardens.

2nd tableau – the courtyard in front of the king's palace

Back in his student clothes Fantasio calms his friends who were planning to get him out the palace prison and clamoring for revenge. Meanwhile the king and the prince are preparing to declare war. Fantasio challenges the prince of Mantua to a duel but the prince backs off, preferring to renounce marriage with Elsbeth and return to Mantua. Fantasio, whom the students have named "king of fools", pleads for peace, is pardoned by the king and Elsbeth names him prince for having avoided war. Fantasio offers her to return the key to the palace gardens she had given him, but she asks him to keep it.

== Recording ==
Sarah Connolly (Fantasio), Brenda Rae (Elsbeth), Brindley Sherrat (The King of Bavaria), Russell Braun (The Prince of Mantua), Robert Murray (Marinoni), Victoria Simmonds (Flamel), Neal Davies (Spark). Mark Elder conducts the Opera Rara Chorus and the Orchestra of the Age of Enlightenment. Recorded December 2013, released 2014. CD Opera Rara Cat:ORC351. This won Best CD (Complete Opera) at the International Opera Awards 2015.

In 1959 Erato Records issued a recording of Camille Maurane (baritone) and György Sebők (piano) performing the "Ballade à la lune". More recently Anne Sofie von Otter and Marianne Crebassa have also recorded this excerpt.
