= Marguerite Priola =

French opera singer (1849–1876)

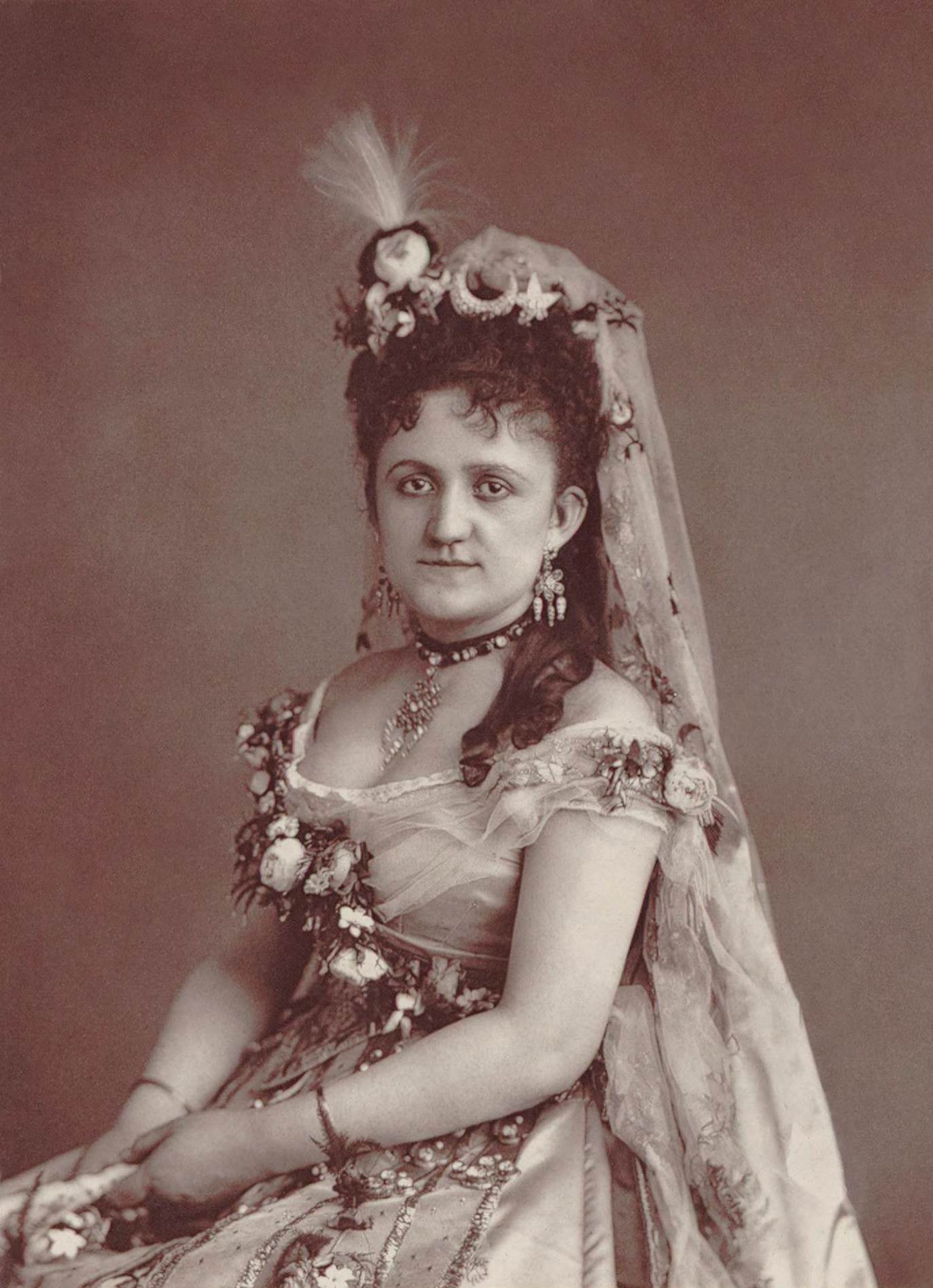
- Priola as Javotte in Le Roi l'a dit at the Opéra Comique in 1873
- Born: Marguerite-Marie-Sophie Polliart; 2 October 1849; Paris, France
- Died: 27 October 1876 (aged 27); Marseille, France
- Occupation: Operatic soprano
- Organizations: Opéra-Comique; La Monnaie

Marguerite-Marie-Sophie Polliart or Poliart, generally known by her stage name Priola (2 October 1849 – 27 October 1876), was a French operatic soprano. She made her début on 6 April 1869 in Paris as The Messenger of Peace in the first French production of Wagner's Rienzi at the Théâtre Lyrique. She enjoyed a successful career at the Opéra-Comique until 1874, performing mainly coloratura soprano roles. There she created several roles, including Princess Elsbeth in Offenbach's Fantasio, Maritana in Massenet's Don César de Bazan, and Javotte in Le Roi l'a dit by Delibes. In 1876, she joined the Opéra de Marseille, where she appeared as Philine in Mignon by Ambroise Thomas. Unable to use her voice to its full potential due to illness, she was booed throughout the performance. The illness developed into a serious outbreak of typhoid fever and she died three weeks later at the age of 27.

== Biography ==
Born in Paris on 2 October 1849, Marguerite-Marie-Sophie Poliart was the daughter of Jules-César Poliart, director of the Théâtre des Folies-Dramatiques. She attended the Conservatoire de Paris, studying music under de Courcelles, voice under Barthe-Banderali and drama under Nathan. While still at the Conservatoire, she made her début at the Théâtre Lyrique on 6 April 1869 as the Messenger of Peace in the first French production of Wagner's Rienzi, enjoying considerable success. This was followed on 10 May by her creating the role of La Duchesse at the première of Ernest Boulanger's Don Quichotte. Her voice and charm were so impressive that Adolphe de Leuven immediately engaged her to perform at the Opéra Comique.

Once there, she created the role of Henriette in Daniel Auber's Rêve d'amour on 20 December 1869. She remained at the Opéra Comique until 1874, appearing in Friedrich von Flotow's l'Ombre on 7 July 1870. In the early 1870s, she appeared as Marie in the 500th performance of Donizetti's La Fille du régiment. On 18 January 1872, she created the role of Princess Elsbeth in Offenbach's Fantasio, on 30 November 1872, she created Maritana in Massenet's Don César de Bazan, and in Le Roi l'a dit by Delibes on 24 August 1873, she created the role of Javotte. While at the Opéra Comique, she also performed in the premières of Émile Paladilhe's Le passant (24 April 1872), and Charles Lenepveu's Le florentin (25 February 1874).

== Final days in Marseille ==
After spending the 1874/75 season with Théâtre de la Monnaie in Brussels, she joined the Opéra de Marseille for the 1876/77 season. When she arrived there, she was suffering from an illness affecting her voice which prevented her performing for several days. Before she had fully recovered, in order to allow the programme to proceed, she agreed to appear as Philine in Mignon by Ambroise Thomas on 6 October 1876. Unable to use her voice to its full potential, she was constantly booed throughout the three-hour performance, reducing her to tears while still on stage. The next day she announced she would be unable to reappear before such a hostile audience and cancelled her engagement. She was however so deeply upset that her illness soon developed into a serious outbreak of typhoid fever, leading to her death in Marseille during the evening of 27 October 1876. She was aged only 27. Her body was returned to Paris, where her funeral at the Église de la Trinité was attended by many theatrical celebrities including Ambroise Thomas.

Emma Calvé, in her autobiography My Life, claimed that Priola's death was a suicide:

One of the most charming and gifted of my friends, Marguerite Priola, whose lovely voice and unusual talent should have brought her a far different fate, committed suicide as a result of the attitude taken by the critics with regard to her creation of a certain rôle.

Another source said that she was killed by a transport au cerveau, a cerebral haemorrhage which led to delirium and high fever, followed by her death within several days. All accounts agree that it was the reception she received from the audience in Marseille that led to her death.

The doctor's certificate, issued at the time, made it quite clear that her death was not caused by suicide or poisoning. It stated: "... Mlle Priola a succombé à une bronchite double, compliquée d'accidents typhiques, auxquels l'avaient prédisposée son état de prostration morale et la rude atteinte portée à son organisation délicate depuis son malheureux début." (Miss Priola succumbed to double bronchitis complicated by typhoid symptoms, encouraged by the moral exhaustion her delicate system had suffered following the harsh consequences of her unfortunate début.)
