= Hanna Hipp =

Polish lyric mezzo-soprano

Hanna Hipp is a Polish lyric mezzo-soprano.

Hipp trained at the Stanisław Moniuszko Academy of Music in Gdańsk, the Guildhall School of Music and Drama and the National Opera Studio.

Hipp was a member of The Royal Opera's Jette Parker Young Artist Programme, and for the 2018/19 season she sings Hansel in Humperdinck's Hansel and Gretel.

She sang the title role in Fantasio by Offenbach at the 2019 Garsington festival, one critic noting that along with her "good-humoured energy" she allowed her "plangent mezzo-soprano drive Fantasio's emotional journey".
