= Assura plc =

Former healthcare property company based in Manchester, England

- Type: Public
- Traded as: LSE: AGR
- Industry: Property
- Founded: 2003; 23 years ago
- Defunct: 2025
- Fate: Merger with Primary Health Properties
- Headquarters: Altrincham, United Kingdom
- Key people: Ed Smith (Chairman), Jonathan Murphy (CEO)
- Products: Investing in healthcare property
- Revenue: ▲£150.2 million (2024)
- Operating income: ▲£129.5 million (2024)
- Net income: ▲£102.3 million (2024)
- Subsidiaries: Assura Properties Plc; Assura Financing Plc
- Website: www.assuraplc.com

Assura is a British property business headquartered in Altrincham, Greater Manchester that has a focus on investing in buildings used for the healthcare sector. As of June 2025, it owned and operated more than 600 general practitioner and primary healthcare buildings in the UK.

The company was listed on the London Stock Exchange until it was acquired by Primary Health Properties in August 2025.

== History ==
The business was launched as The Medical Property Investment Fund in 2003 and became listed on the London Stock Exchange in that year. The name was changed to Assura Group in 2006. In 2008 the company bought new premises for expansion in Halton. Assura sold its Assura Medical division to Virgin Group in 2010, which rebranded it as Virgin Care.

It acquired AH Medical, another primary healthcare business, in 2011. It named Graham Roberts, a former finance director of British Land Company, as chief cxecutive in March 2012. In June 2012 it decided to convert to Real Estate Investment Trust (REIT) status.

The company was the subject of an initial public offering on the London Stock Exchange in January 2015.

In July 2016, Assura announced that its chief executive Graham Roberts had died of cancer. The company appointed its financial director, Jonathan Murphy, as its interim chief executive and he was confirmed on a permanent basis in February 2017.

At the beginning of 2021, the company acquired Apollo Capital Projects, increasing its pipeline by an initial eight schemes and expanding the company's offering to the NHS.

In April 2025, the company's board initially agreed an acquisition offer by private capital investors KKR & Co. and Stonepeak of £1.6 billion. On June 11, a month after receiving a competing bid from Primary Health Properties (PHP) of £1.68 billion, KKR and Stonepeak made a final offer of £1.7 billion which was initially recommended by the Assura's board.

When shareholders pressed and the firm recommended PHP's offer, the deal was subject to regulatory and shareholder approval. After the deal was approved by Assura shareholders on 12 August 2025, PHP confirmed that its offer had gone unconditional with 62.93% acceptance on 15 August 2025.

== Operations ==
The business invests in and develops primary care buildings in the UK. As of March 2024, the company's portfolio stood at 614 primary care medical centres.

As an NHS partner the company accommodates NHS services within communities including, general practice, diagnostic and treatment services (including x-ray), renal dialysis, MSK physiotherapy, dentistry, acute consultant clinics and other community and social prescribing services.
