= Krzysztof Warlikowski =

Polish theatre director (born 1962)

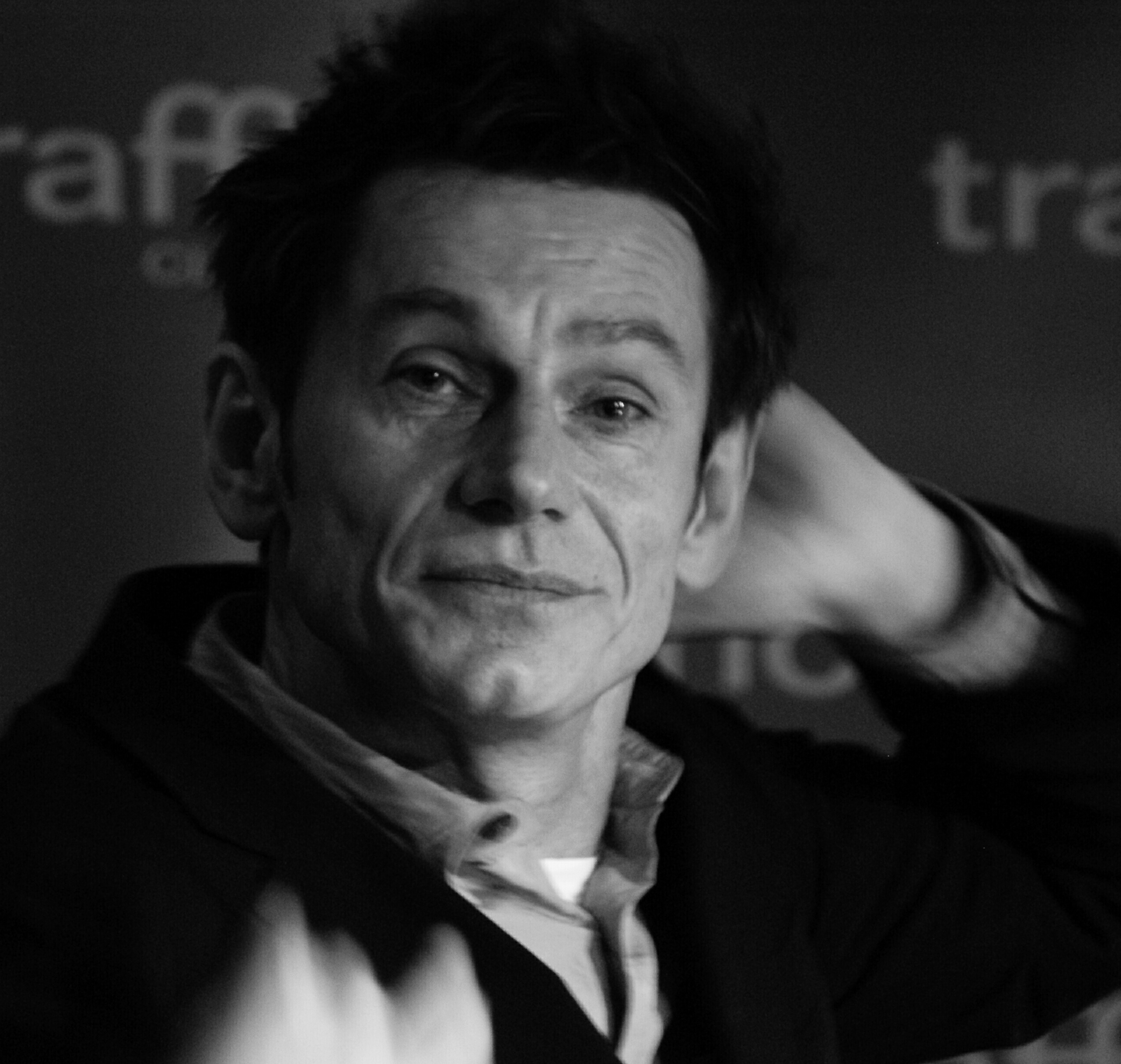
- Born: 26 May 1962 (age 64); Szczecin
- Citizenship: Polish
- Education: Ludwik Solski Academy of Dramatic Art in Kraków
- Occupation: theatre director
- Years active: 1993 - present
- Partner: Małgorzata Szczęśniak
- Awards: Witkacy Prize - Critics' Circle Award (2003); Obie Award (2008); Europe Prize Theatrical Realities (2008); Medal for Merit to Culture – Gloria Artis (2011); Commandeur des Arts et Lettres (2013); International Opera Award (2019)
- Honours: Silver Medal for Merit to Culture – Gloria Artis Ordre des Arts et des Lettres

Krzysztof Warlikowski (Polish pronunciation: [ˈkʂɨʂtɔf varliˈkɔfskʲi]; born 26 May 1962) is a Polish theatre director. He is the creator and artistic director of Nowy Teatr (New Theatre) in Warsaw.

== Biography ==
He studied history, philosophy and Romance languages at the Jagiellonian University and also philosophy, French language and literature at École Pratique Des Hautes Études at the Sorbonne. He graduated in directing from Ludwik Solski Academy for the Dramatic Arts in 1993. Among his teachers was director Krystian Lupa. In the early 1990s Warlikowski worked for some time as Lupa's assistant. He met and learned also from Peter Brook and Giorgio Strehler.

Warlikowski directed his first plays at Stary Teatr in Kraków, where he staged Heinrich von Kleist's The Marquis of O. in 1993. His later dramas were performed at various theatres in Poland and Europe, including Teatr Nowy (The New Theatre) in Poznań, Warsaw's Teatr Studio (Studio Theatre), Teatr im. W. Horzycy (W. Horzyca Theatre) in Toruń, Teatr Dramatyczny (The Dramatic Theatre) in Warsaw.

Since 1999 he directed for TR Warszawa (Variety Theatre). Currently his plays are being performed at Nowy Teatr (New Theatre) in Warsaw, which he founded in 2008 and at which he is an artistic director.

He was the author of the Message of World Theatre Day 2015.

In 2021 he received the Golden Lion Lifetime Achievement Award at the Teatro Biennale in Venice for being "the advocate for a profound renewal of the European language of theatre", "relying on references from cinema and an original use of video, inventing new forms of theatre that aim to re-establish the bond between the play and the audience" encouraging the latter to "rip away the paper backdrop of their lives and to discover what is really hidden underneath".

== Personal life ==
Warlikowski is gay and was in a long relationship with actor Jacek Poniedziałek but he is currently married to Polish set designer Małgorzata Szczęśniak who is his life partner.

== Europe Theatre Prize ==
In 2008, he was awarded the X Europe Prize Theatrical Realities, in Thessaloniki, with the following motivation:

Krzysztof Warlikowski belongs to the family of directors whose theatre is the testimony of an adventure, of a relationship to the reality and the art that define them. They thus affirm an identity not thanks to a preconstituted formal universe or to a way of working, but to a subjective experience whose scope is shown by their productions. These are the “romantics” of the modern theatre! Each in his own way, they create what we might call the theatres of the self. For Warlikowski, as for Chéreau, directing means establishing a relationship between two areas of subjectivity. There is no place for the neutral here. The theatre serves to reveal their personalities grappling with both the stage and the world. A world no longer reduced to the dichotomies of politics, but on the contrary a restless and secret world, a world that needs artists to reveal itself in its incomparable complexity.

Warlikowski bears the mark of his Polish identity, a lacerated identity that intends to tackle both history and the helpless confusion of the being. He is interested in Shakespeare and in contemporary writing, the two poles that shape his theatre. Each throws light on the other, thus increasing the intensity of their exchange. Already known in Germany, discovered in Avignon thanks to an innovative Hamlet and above all to Sarah Kane’s Cleansed, a masterpiece of staging, followed by a harrowing Dibbouk and Hanok Levin’s Kroum, he relentlessly follows his investigation into the lacerated condition of modern man. “Life is hard”, but beyond all this the director and his theatre invite us to find the means of salvation in a frozen world, a world of suicidal passions and forbidden loves. On the edge of the abyss, he never ceases to search for reasons to survive.

In recent years his theatre work has been joined by opera productions, where, without denying its needs, Warlikowski injects a dose of the contemporary tragedy with which his art and his being continue to be imbued.

Warlikowski is thus an artist of the stage whose art possesses something of the extreme contemporary in the deepest sense of the term. The theatre of the self, true, but also the theatre of a generation. It is from their encounter that Warlikowski’s feverish passion is born.

== Awards ==
- 1997 – Honorary Golden Yorick (Honorowy Złoty Yorick) – award of the Theatrum Gedanense for his staging of Shakespeare's The Winter's Tale at the New Theatre in Poznań;
- 1998 – Award for direction of Shakespeare's The Taming of the Shrew at the Dramatic Theatre in Warsaw – 3. Ogólnopolski Konkurs na Inscenizacje Dzieł Dramatycznych Szekspira / 3rd Polish National Competition for Stagings of the Dramatic Works of Shakespeare;
- 2003 – Golden Yorick (Złoty Yorick) – award of the Theatrum Gedanense Foundation for the best Shakespeare production of the 2002/2003 season – for The Tempest at the Variety Theatre in Warsaw; Award of the French Theatre Critics' Union for his production of Sarah Kane's Cleansed at the Variety Theatre in Warsaw, judged to be the best foreign language production to be presented in France during the 2002/2003 season; Witkacy Prize - Critics' Circle Award for the popularization of Polish theatrical culture abroad, bestowed by the Theatre Critics' Section of the Polish branch of the International Theatre Institute; Laur Konrada / Conrad's Laurels – 6. Festiwal Sztuki Reżyserskiej "Interpretacje" / 6th "Interpretations" Festival of the Art of Directing in Katowice – for his production of Sarah Kane's Cleansed at the Variety Theatre in Warsaw; Polityka weekly's Paszport Polityki Award for 2002 in the category of theatre, "for not only his achievements of the last season but above all for restoring belief in the artistic and ethical mission of theatre";
- 2004 – Diploma from the Ministry of Foreign Affairs for exceptional promotion of Polish culture abroad in 2003;
- 2006 – Meyerhold Award in Moscow for exceptional accomplishment in theater worldwide;
- 2007 – Konrad Swinarski Award for Best Director of the 2006/2007 season, for his play Angels;
- 2008 – Obie Award, New York, from the weekly Village Voice for directing Hanoch Levin’s Krum; Award of the French Theatre Critics' Union for best foreign spectacle for Tony Kushner’s Angels in America with TR Warszawa; International Award Europe Prize Theatrical Realities awarded in Thessaloniki for innovation in theater; Honorary European Medal;
- 2009 – Festiwal Sztuk Przyjemnych i Nieprzyjemnych w Łodzi – Tytuł Najlepszego Spektaklu dla przedstawienia "Anioły w Ameryce" z TR Warszawa; Divine Comedy Festival in Kraków – Award of the Divine Comedy for a director "for his remarkable sense of drama, through which he questions the idea of truth in performance";
- 2010 – Award of the Ministry of Culture of Culture and National Heritage for (A)pollonia;
- 2011 – Silver Medal for Merit to Culture – Gloria Artis;
- 2012 – Golden Mask for the best foreign performance shown in Russia in 2011 for (A)pollonia;
- 2013 – Commandeur des Arts et Lettres from the French Ambassador in Poland, Pierre Buhler.
- 2019 – International Opera Award for Best New Production – Janáček: From the House of the Dead (Royal Opera House)
- 2021 – Golden Lion Lifetime Achievement Award at the Venice Biennale Teatro

== See also ==
- Polish opera
- List of Poles
