= Primary Health Properties =

British real estate investment trust

Primary Health Properties plc
- Type: Public real estate investment trust
- Traded as: LSE: PHP; FTSE 250 component
- Industry: Investment trust
- Founded: 1995
- Founder: Harry Hyman
- Headquarters: London, United Kingdom
- Key people: Harry Hyman (Chairman); Mark Davies (CEO)
- Revenue: ▲£259 million (2025)
- Operating income: ▲£221 million (2025)
- Net income: ▲£119 million (2025)
- Website: www.phpgroup.co.uk

Primary Health Properties plc is a British real estate investment company headquartered in London, England. As of June 2025, the company owns and operates more than 1,000 primary healthcare facilities within the United Kingdom and Ireland. It is listed on the London Stock Exchange and is also a constituent of the FTSE 250 Index.

== History ==
Primary Health Properties was incorporated in 1995, floated on the Alternative Investment Market in 1996, and listed on the London Stock Exchange in November 1998. The company switched to Real Estate Investment Trust status when REITs were introduced in the UK in January 2007.

In September 2018, Primary Health Properties acquired an accommodation block next to Wansbeck General Hospital in September 2018, as well as Jellia Holdings, the owner of three purpose-built primary care centres in Navan Road, Dublin, Newbridge, County Kildare and Celbridge.

In June 2019, Primary Health Properties completed a £1 billion merger with Medicx Fund, creating the largest healthcare property investor in the UK, with a combined portfolio of almost 500 properties.

In 2020, the company raised £140 million through a placing of 96.6 million shares to fund future acquisitions.

In 2022, it bought Chiswick Medical Centre, which is let to HCA International Ltd, in London for £34.5 million.

In May 2025, the company made an offer of £1.68 billion to acquire Assura plc which was accepted.

== Operations ==
In 2017, it was reported that 90 per cent of the company's rent came from the National Health Service with nine per cent from pharmacies. The company had a portfolio worth £5.9 billion as of 31 December 2025.
