= Małgorzata Szczęśniak =

Polish stage and costume designer (born 1954)

- Born: 1954 (age 71–72)
- Education: Jagiellonian University; Jan Matejko Academy of Fine Arts
- Occupations: stage designer costume designer
- Partner: Krzysztof Warlikowski

Małgorzata Szczęśniak (born 1954) is a Polish stage and costume designer. She worked with director Krzysztof Warlikowski on most of his plays.

== Biography ==
She graduated in psychology from Jagiellonian University. Then she studied at Jan Matejko Academy of Fine Arts, from which she graduated in 1984.

She is perhaps best known as the author of spaces and costumes in Krzysztof Warlikowski's performances. The artists have been working together since their student years. Currently they are a marriage.

Szczęśniak's works were displayed at various exhibitions; in 1990 at Prague Quadriennale, in 1994 at Young Stage Designers' Exhibition in Katowice, in 2007 again at Prague Quadriennale, in 2008 at "La Bellone" center in Brussels and in 2013 at Nowy Teatr in Warsaw.

On July 1, 2015, she was awarded by the President of Poland with a Knight's Cross of Polonia Restituta. In 2021, she received the International Opera Award for best designer.
