= Barnolt =

French operatic tenor

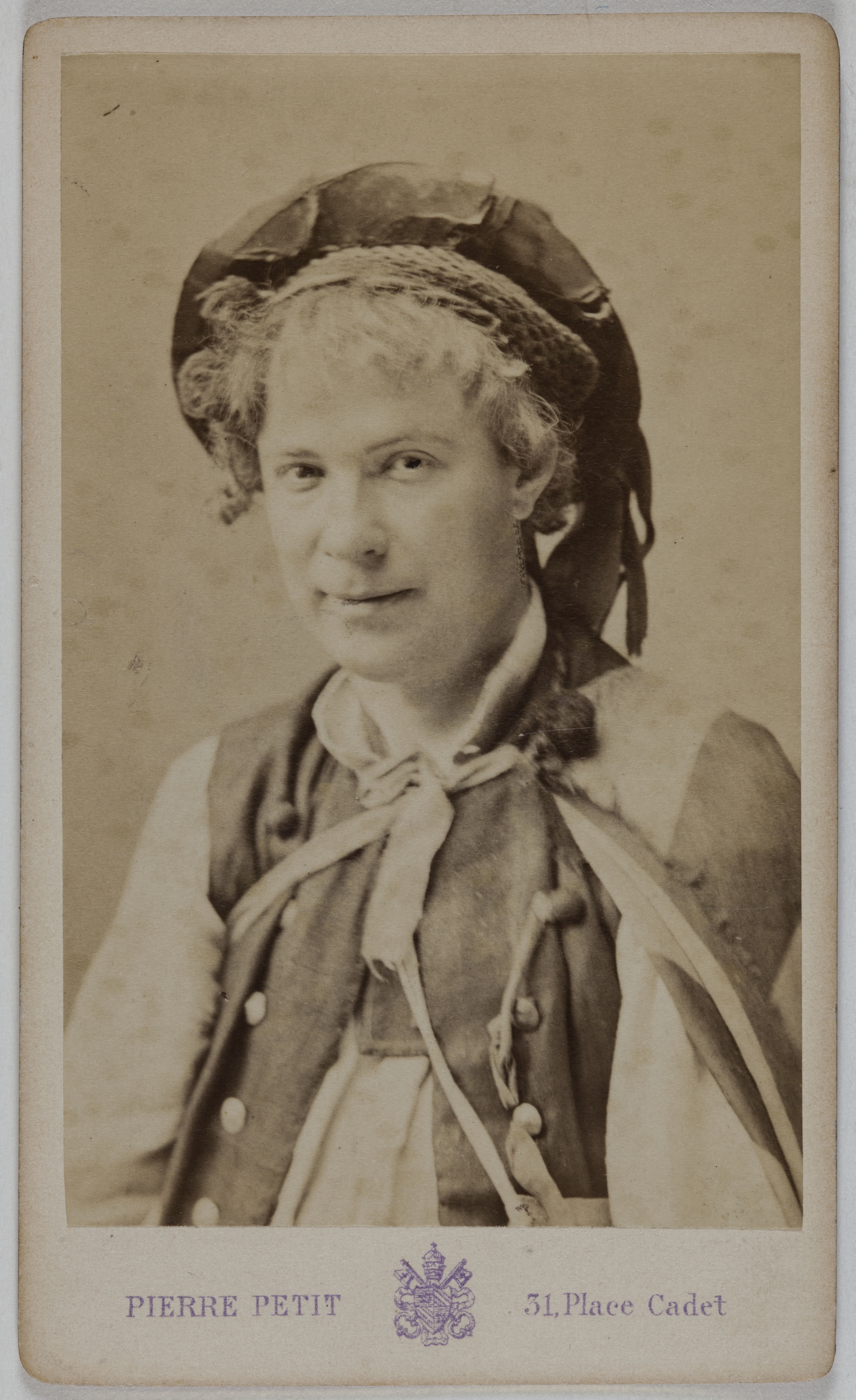
- Born: 14 June 1839
- Died: 15 June 1900 (aged 61)

Barnolt was the stage name of Paul Fleuret (14 June 1839 – 15 June 1900), a French operatic tenor associated with the Opéra-Comique in Paris.

== Career ==
After a year of study at the Paris Conservatoire, where his teachers included Charles Bataille, Barnolt made his debut at the Folies-Marigny and further appearances at the Fantaisies-Parisiennes (1866) where he began to take on roles in the trial repertoire.

Barnolt made his debut at the Opéra-Comique on 23 July 1870 as Dandolo in Zampa and went on to become one of the "most useful and faithful servants of the Opéra-Comique". He sang Remendado in the premiere of Carmen and returned to sing this role at the Opéra-Comique revivals of 1883, 1891, and 1898. He was on-stage singing Fréderic in Thomas' Mignon the night of the fire at the Salle Favart on 25 May 1887.

At the Opéra-Comique he also sang the roles of Ali-bajou (Le Caïd), Lillas Pastia (Carmen), Dickson (La dame blanche), Bertrand (Le déserteur), Thibaut (Les dragons de Villars), Beppo (Fra Diavolo), Midas (Galathée), le Poète (Louise), Benetto (Le maître de chapelle), Fréderic (Mignon), Basilio (The Marriage of Figaro), Blaise (Le Nouveau Seigneur de village), Cantarelli (Le Pré aux clercs), Guillaume (Richard Coeur-de-lion), Scapin (La Serva Padrona), and Mouck (La statue).

His last recorded performances are in 1900, the year of his death.

== Roles created ==
Among thirty Opéra-Comique premieres were:

- Pacôme in Le roi l'a dit, 1873
- Remendado in Carmen, 1875
- Ridendo in Les Noces de Fernande, 1878
- Séraphin in Le Pain bis, 1879
- Desfonandrès/1st médecin in L’amour médecin, 1880
- Trivelin in Joli Gilles, 1884
- Basile in Le roi malgré lui, 1887
- Gil in Proserpine, 1887
- Guillaume in La Basoche, 1890
- Cynalopex in Phryné, 1893

Barnolt also sang in the Paris premieres of Werther (Schmidt) in 1893, Falstaff (Bardolphe) in 1894 and La bohème (Parpignol) 1898.
