= Medicx Fund =

Irish property investment company

- Industry: Investment
- Headquarters: Ireland

Medicx Fund was an Irish property investment company listed on the FTSE SmallCap Index specialising in primary healthcare infrastructure backed by long-term Government contracts.

The company was registered in Guernsey and incorporated in 2006. In 2019, the firm was taken over by Primary Health Properties in 2019.

== History ==
Medicx Fund was owned and managed by Octopus Healthcare. Its Irish portfolio, consisting of four primary care schemes currently up and running, with a fifth one in Rialto, Dublin due to be completed in early 2019, was valued at more than €60 million. The company bought a new primary healthcare centre in Tallaght for €15.5 million in 2017.

Medicx Fund purchased One Medical Group in June 2018 for £63.8 million. At the time, it owned 166 properties, 3 of which were still under construction, with a total value of valued at £719.7 million. Annual rent income is £43.9 million.

It was taken over by Primary Health Properties in 2019.
