= Annette Campbell-White =

New Zealand investment banker and philanthropist

Annette J. Campbell-White is a New Zealand-born venture capitalist.

== Biography ==
Campbell-White was born in New Zealand and attended the University of Cape Town in South Africa. She graduated with a Bachelor of Science in Chemical Engineering and Master of Science in Physical Chemistry. She was the first biotechnology analyst on Wall Street and the first female partner at Hambrecht & Quist, a leading investment banking firm.

Campbell-White founded MedVenture Associates, a biomedical venture capital firm, in 1986 and was a senior managing director at the firm until her retirement in 2015.

In 2019, she published her memoir, Beyond Market Value: A Memoir of Book Collecting and the World of Venture Capital.

=== Philanthropy ===
In 1997, Campbell-White established the Kia Ora Foundation to provide educational and other opportunities to musicians and artists from New Zealand.

In 2016, she joined the Wikimedia Endowment Advisory Board to help administer the endowment fund as an ongoing source of funding for the Wikimedia Foundation.

In 2018, Campbell-White was honoured at the sixth annual International Opera Awards for her lifelong commitment to opera and support of young artists and the performing arts. She has been a board member for the San Francisco Opera for many years, and she and her husband have sponsored San Francisco Opera performances since 1995. She had also sat on the board of Cal Performances, a performing arts organisation at the University of California, Berkeley.
