= Buki Shiff =

Israeli opera and theatre costume and set designer

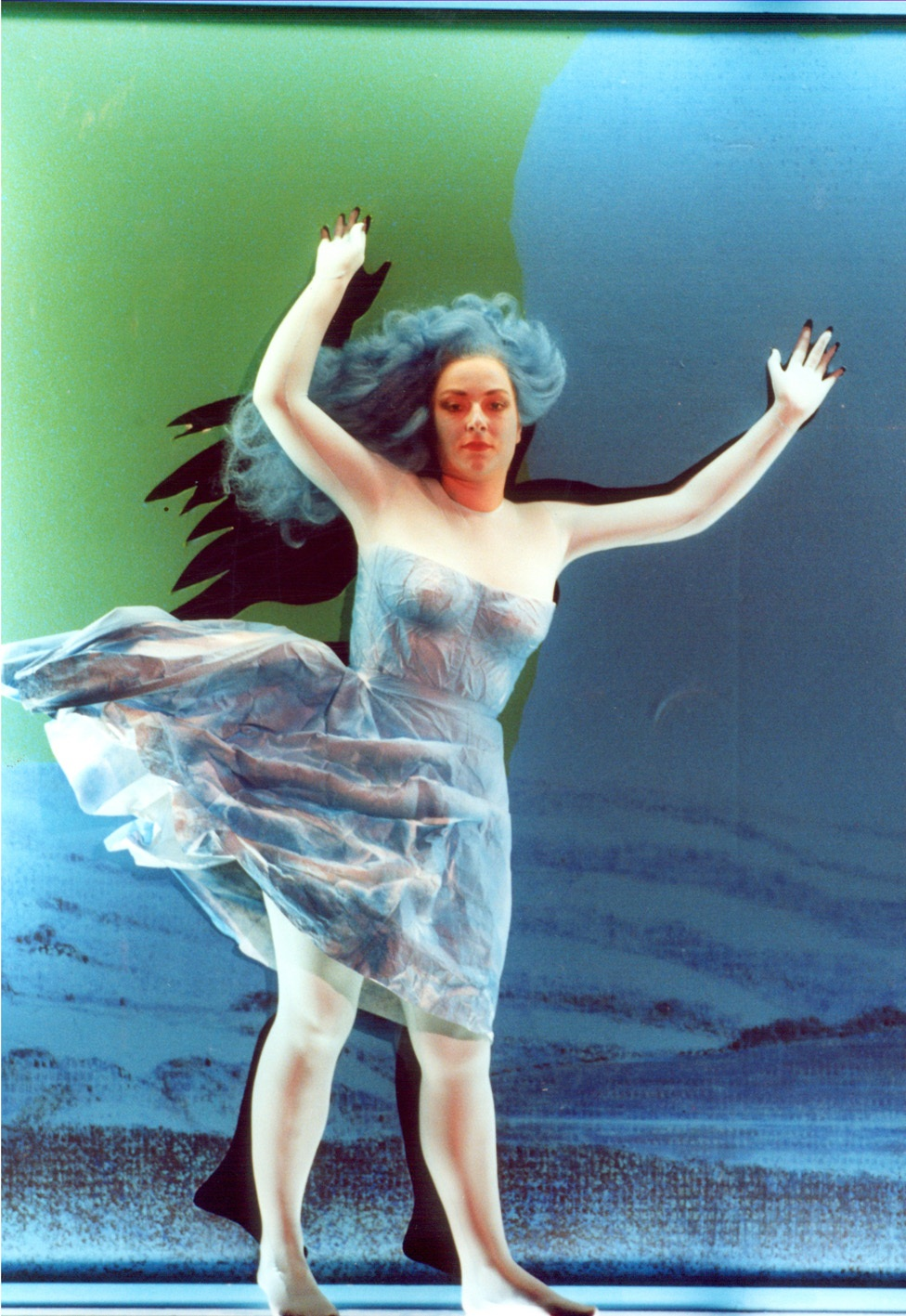
A 2002 costume by Buki Shiff

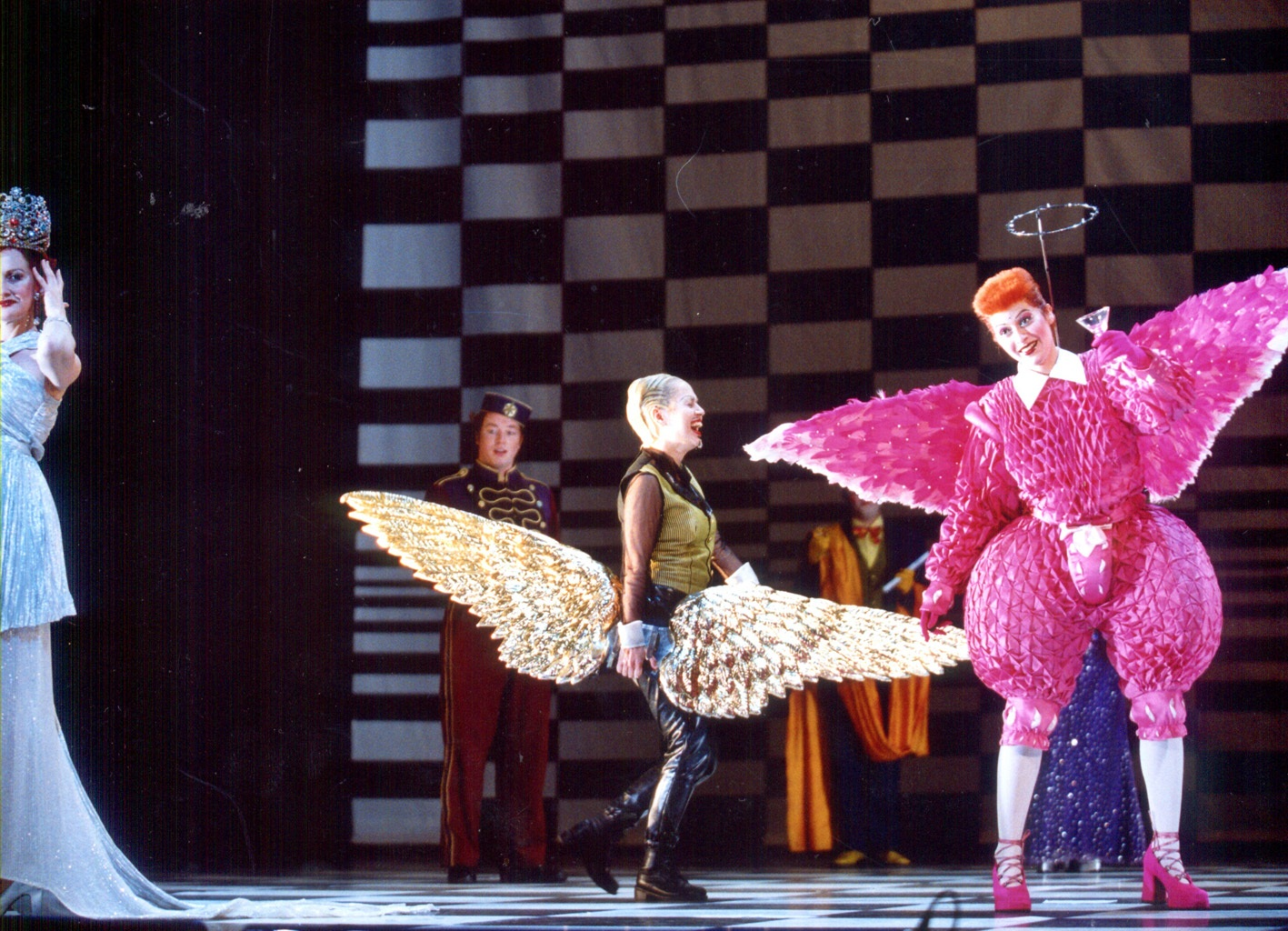
1997 costumes

Buki Shiff (Hebrew: בוקי שיף) is an Israeli opera and theatre costume and set designer.

== Biography ==
Buki Shiff was born in Tel Aviv, Israel.

In 2008, she made her debut with The Royal Opera, designing costumes for La Calisto, directed by David Alden.

Shiff won Best Costume Designer at the 2013 International Opera Awards, Best Stage and Costume Designer at the 2006 Israel Theater Prize, and the 2008 Rosenblum Award for Artist of the Year.

Shiff is based in Tel Aviv.
