= Virginia Zucchi =

Italian dancer (1849–1933)

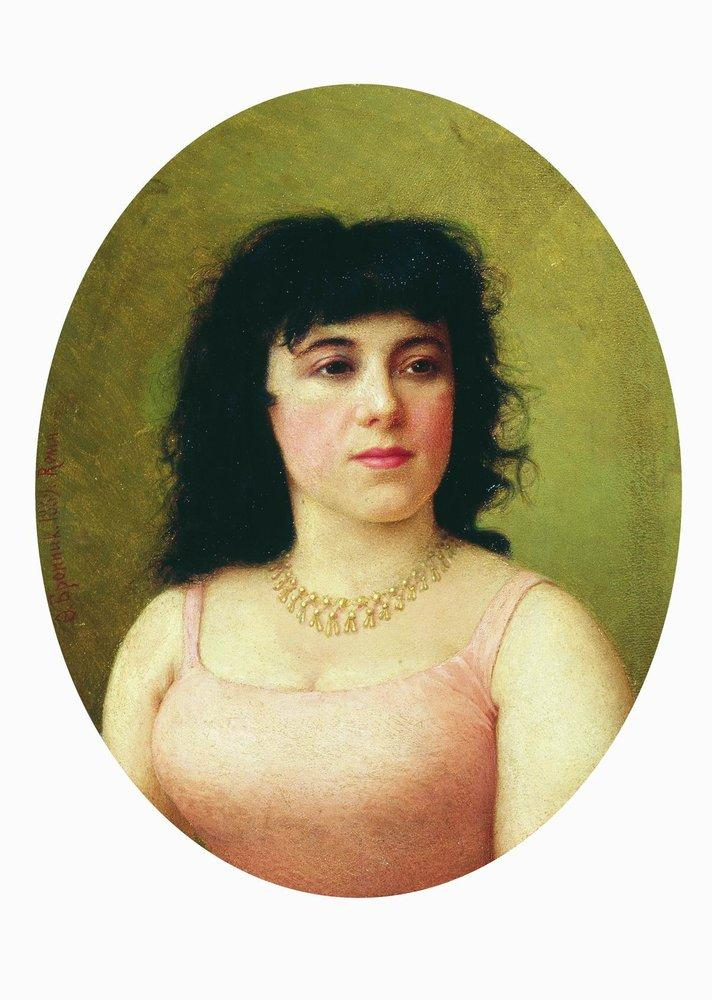
Portrait by Fyodor Bronnikov, 1889

Virginia Zucchi (10 February 1849 – 9 October 1930) was an Italian dancer and teacher. Her career as a ballerina spanned the years 1864 to 1898, and she was known as "the Divine Zucchi" or even "the Divine Virginia" for her artistry, expressiveness, and virtuosity. Perhaps her most lasting legacy is the celebrated La Esmeralda pas de six, which Marius Petipa created for her to the music of Riccardo Drigo in 1886. She was a guest artist in Berlin, London, Paris, Madrid, Milan, Naples and Rome. She was a force in introducing Italian technique in Russia.

== Life ==
Zucchi was born in Cortemaggiore on 10 February 1849. She studied ballet under Lepri and Carlo Blasis in Milan. She made her debut in 1864 in Varese and danced throughout Italy, as well as in Berlin and Paris. In 1885, she went to St. Petersburg to dance for the summer at Kin Grust, one of the music theaters that replaced the Imperial Theatre during the summer in St. Petersburg. The Imperial Theatre was the official Russian theatre that was closed during the summer months. In addition to Zucchi's gaining popularity and high public regard from these appearances, upon dancing for the Tzar he insisted that she joined the Maryinsky Theatre in Russia where she danced until 1888. During her time with the Imperial she performed in A Trip to the Moon(1885), Padmana in Brahma(1885), Coppelia, as well as many of Marius Petipa's ballets and ballet revivals, including The Pharaoh's Daughter (1885), La Fille Mal Gardée (1885) La Esmeralda (1886), and The King's Command or The Pupils of Dupré (1887). On one occasion under Petipa, Zucchi performed an entire solo en pointe.

Because of the intensity of the dramatic dynamic of her performances, she inspired the formation of Mir iskusstva ("World of Art"). Mir iskusstva was a movement created by Ballets Russes collaborators that included Leon Bakst, Sergei Diaghilev, and Alexandre Benois. Together they founded the journal of the same name that was focused more on the visual than the performing arts. In 1917, Bakst even drew a portrait of Zucchi at 68.

Of this period, Mary Clarke and Clement Crisp say:

Zucchi revolutionized ballet in Russia. The magic of her presence, the extraordinary emotional power of her performances gripped the imagination of the public and also other artists. Regrettably, she was [then] forbidden the Imperial stages by the Tzar's command because of a liaison with an aristocrat.

After her tenure with the Imperial Ballet came to an end, Zucchi danced in Moscow and St. Petersburg with her own company in the late 1880s and the early 1890s. She was commissioned by Cosima Wagner to choreograph the Bacchanal in Tannhäuser when the opera was performed at the Bayreuth Festival for the first time in 1891. She also performed in the Palais Garnier (Opera of Paris) in 1895. Her final performance was in Nice, France, in 1898. She also contributed to the development of the St. Petersburg ballet school, and her influence in this led to the school making greater demands of its dancers in terms of technical perfection.

Zucchi later retired to Monte Carlo, where she opened a school & became a teacher. Her dancing influenced many ballerinas after her, including Mathilde Kschessinska. When Kschessinska first saw Zucchi in person, she said:

I was fourteen when the famous Virginia Zucchi arrived in St Petersburg. From the day that Zucchi appeared on our stage I began to work with fire, energy and application: my one dream was to emulate her. The result was that when I left the School I already had a complete mastery of technique.

She died in Nice on 9 October 1930.

== Gallery ==
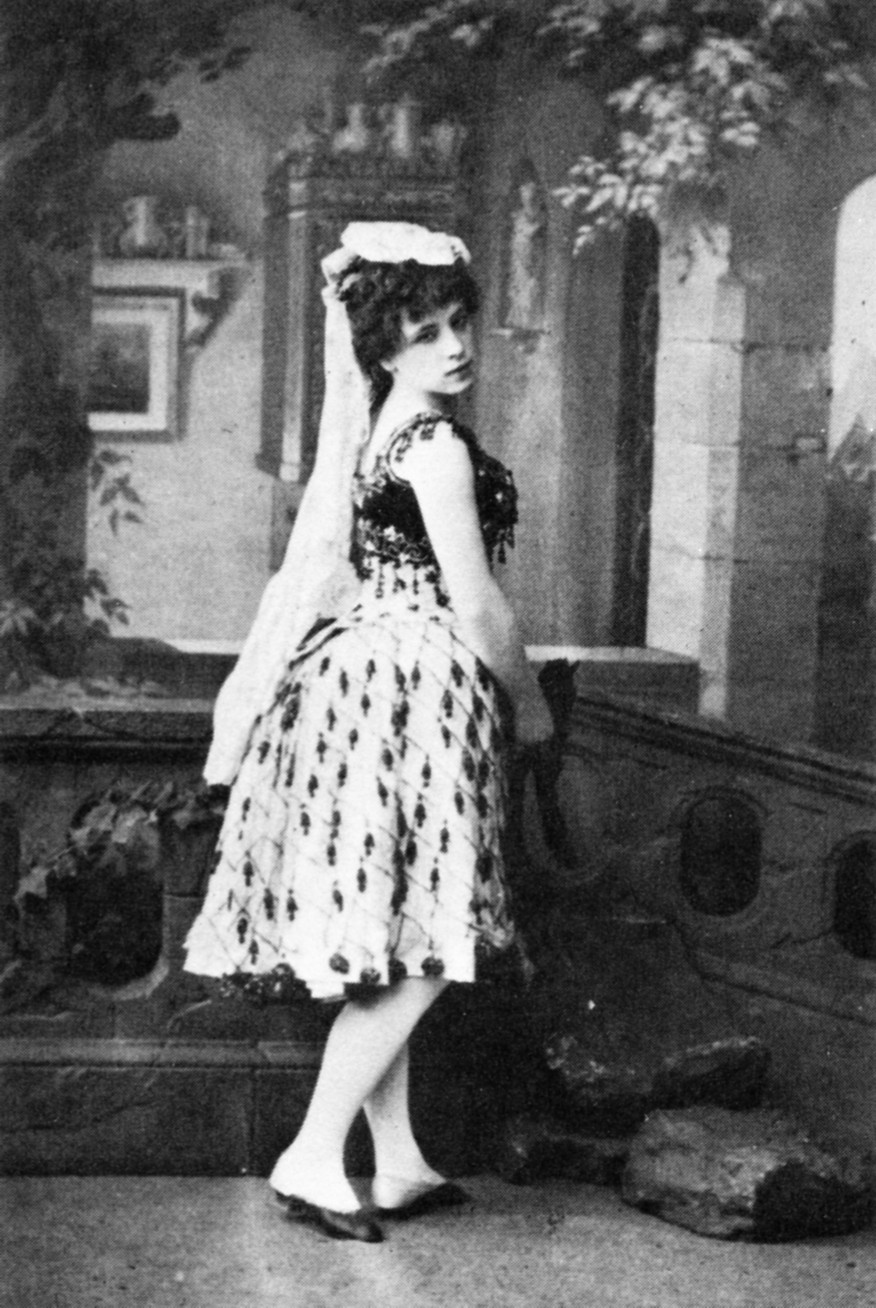
Virginia Zucchi in Petipa's version of Paquita, 1884.

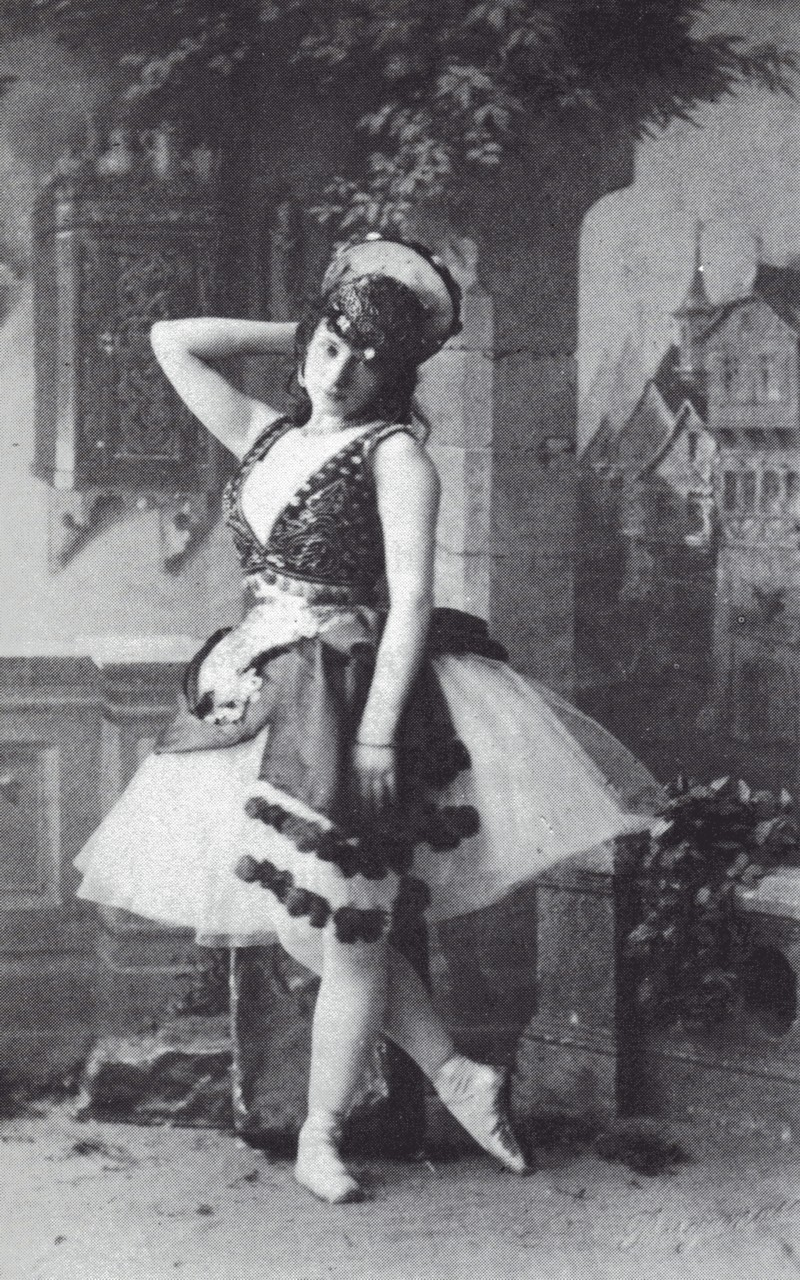
Virginia Zucchi in La Esmeralda, 1886

== See also ==
- Women in dance
