= Buki (musical instrument) =

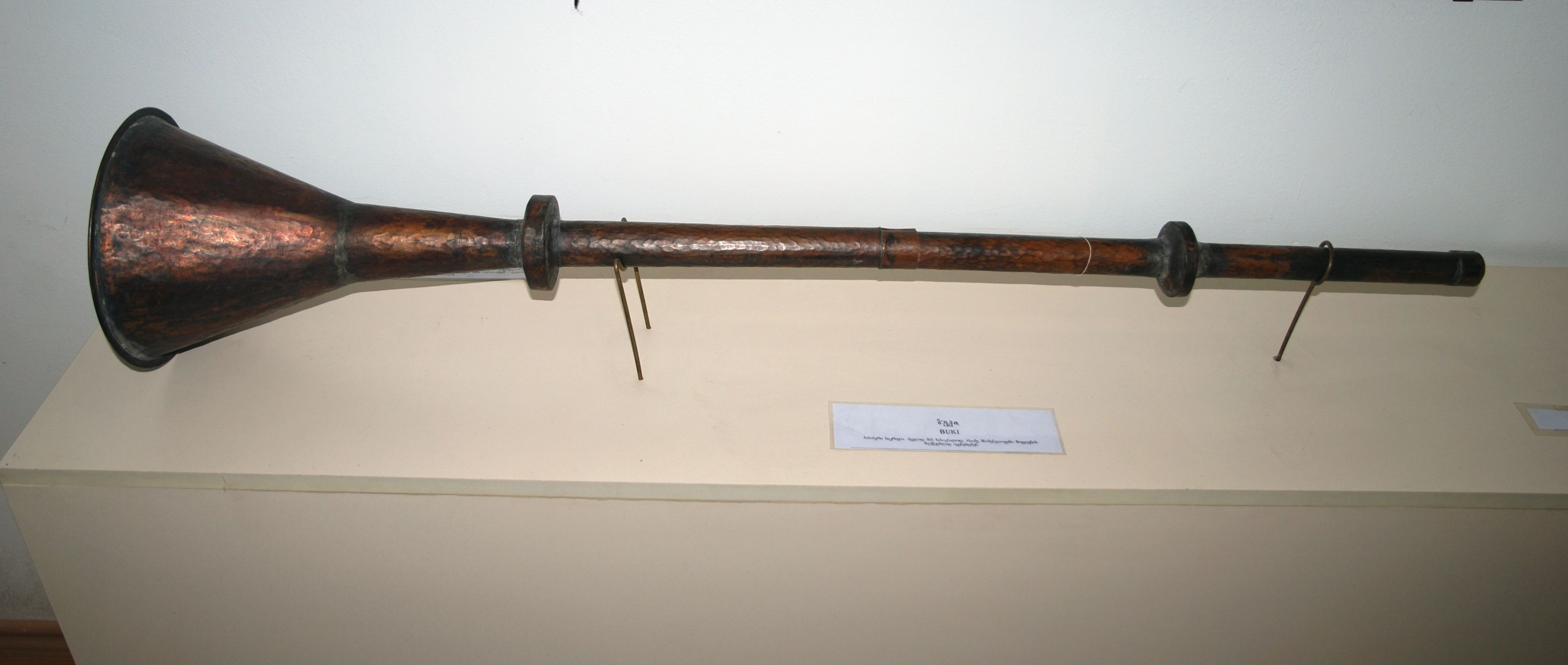

A buki is a brass instrument from Svaneti (north-west part of Georgia). The length of the horn is 1.27 metres (4.2 ft) and the diameter of a blowing piece is 28 millimetres (1.1 in).

== See also ==
- Nafir
