= The King's Command or The Pupils of Dupré =

1886 ballet by Marius Petipa

Drawings by Karel Brozh of various scenes from the Petipa/Vizentini ballet The King's Command. St. Petersburg, 1887

The King's Command (also known as L'Ordre du Roi, or Les Élèves de Dupré) is a ballet in 4 Acts-6 Scenes, with choreography by Marius Petipa and music composed by Albert Vizentini.

The work was first presented by the Imperial Ballet on 26 February [O.S. 14 February] 1886, 1886 at the Imperial Bolshoi Kamenny Theatre in St. Petersburg, Russia, with Virginia Zucchi (as Pepita), Pavel Gerdt (as Pepito), Enrico Cecchetti (as Dupré), and Lev Ivanov (as Milon) in the leading roles. This was the last ballet to be given at the St. Petersburg Imperial Bolshoi Kamenny Theatre before it was demolished in 1886.

== Revivals ==
- Revival by Marius Petipa for the Imperial Ballet, first presented on November 30/December 12, 1887 at the Imperial Mariinsky Theatre in St. Petersburg, Russia. Principal Dancers: Virginia Zucchi (as Pepita), Pavel Gerdt (as Pepito), and Enrico Cecchetti (as Dupré). (Note: For his revival of 1887 Petipa added two new dances: the Gallarda, and a pas de deux titled "The Fisherman and the Pearl" for Virginia Zucchi and Enrico Cecchetti.)
- Revival by Marius Petipa for the Imperial Ballet in an abridgement in 2 Acts under the title Les Élèves de Dupré (The Pupils of Dupré), with Riccardo Drigo revising Albert Vizentini's score. First presented on February 14/26, 1900 for the Imperial Court at the Theatre of the Hermitage in St. Petersburg, Russia. For this revival many of the character's names were changed, including the principal roles of Pepita and Pepito to Violette and Vestris. Principal Dancers: Olga Preobrajenskaya (as Violette/Pepita), Nikolai Legat (as Vestris/Pepito), Alexander Shiraev (as Dupré), Pavel Gerdt (as Louis XIV), Pierina Legnani (as Camargo), and Lev Ivanov (as the Count of Montignac). (Note: Petipa's choreography for The Pupils of Dupré (his 1900 abridgement of The King's Command) was notated in the Stepanov method of choreographic notation not long after its premiere. It is today part of the Sergeyev Collection, which is housed in the Harvard University Library Theatre Collection.)

== Gallery ==
Lev Ivanov as Milon in The King's Command. St. Petersburg, 1886

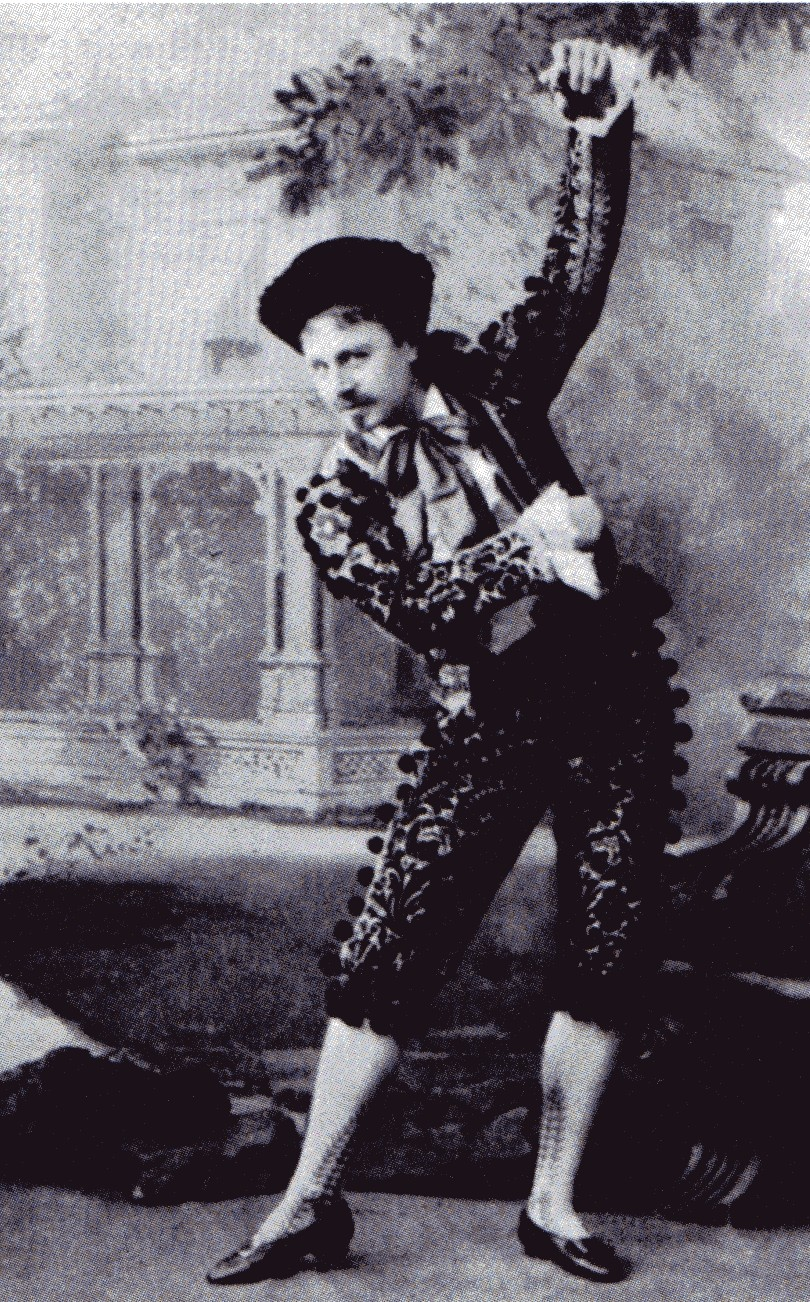
Pavel Gerdt as Pepito in The King's Command. St. Petersburg, 1886
