= Harry Hyman =

British property entrepreneur (born 1956)

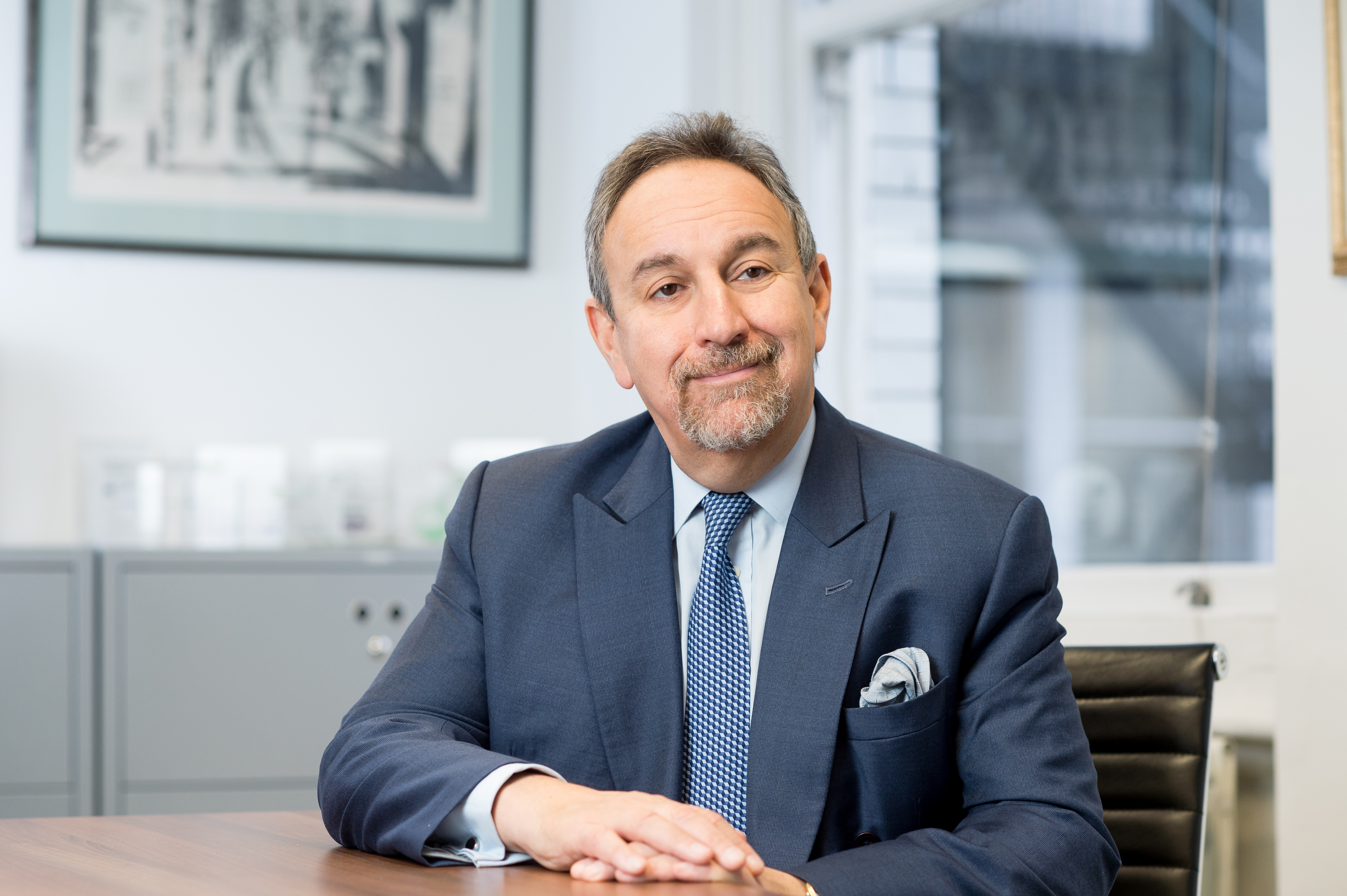
Harry Hyman

Harry Hyman (born 1956 in Harrow, United Kingdom) is a British property entrepreneur. In 1994, he founded Primary Health Properties, a company based on the idea of purchasing primary health care premises and leasing them back to NHS General Practitioners through property investment. The company is part of the FTSE 250 and operates more than 480 medical centers. He is now the non-executive Chair having handed over the CEO baton to Mark Davies in 2024.

Hyman is chair of Biopharma Credit, a listed investment trust with the ticker BPCR.
