= Daniele Zanettovich =

Italian composer and conductor (born 1950)

Daniele Zanettovich (born 1950 in Trieste) is an Italian composer and conductor.

== Biography ==
Zanettovich started out his career as a pianist, winning the Fourth National Festival of Student Pianists in La Spezia. Since the late 1960s, however, he has focused more on composing. His career as a composer began when he was admitted to the final reading at the GB Viotti International Composition Competition for three straight years (1967, 1968, and 1969).

Zanettovich wrote a two-volume textbook called Appunti per il corso di armonia principale which is widely used by composition schools in Italy.

As a conductor, he has appeared with the Orchestre National de l'Opéra de Monte-Carlo, the orchestra of the Teatro Verdi in Trieste, the orchestra of AIDEM in Florence, the Orchestra Sinfonica di Sanremo, the orchestra of Ente Lirico dell'Arena di Verona as well as various chamber ensembles.

Successful as an academic as well as a professional composer, Zanettovich was a professor of composition at the conservatory Jacopo Tomadini in Udine until retiring in 2009.

== Compositions ==
- 1971 Celine, work that is performed at the Teatro Donizetti in Bergamo in October of the same year
- 1972 E & FFlauto-Concerto
- 1972 Concerto di Materada (mezzo-soprano, string quartet, brass, strings and narrator), based on the eponymous novel by Fulvio Tomizza
- 1973 The songs of peace (mezzo-soprano, bassoon and small orchestra) built on popular topics Czechoslovak
- 1974 Suite, for clarinette Si b and piano (Italy)
- 1975 Corégraphies pour orchester, first prize at the XII International Competition of symphonic composition Premio Città di Trieste, premiered at the Teatro Verdi in Trieste
- 1975 Invention on a tritone, first prize at the National Competition of XVI piano composition GF Malipiero of Treviso
- 1977 Estadio Nacional: Lager in 1973 for flute, strings and drum, world premiere at the festival Malatesta of Rimini
- 1977 Passio prophana for orchestra, second prize at the International Festival Gino Marinuzzi of Sanremo
- 1977 Notes in a war cemetery for flute and percussion, requiem for voices and percussion
- 1978 Monumentum Luigi Dallapiccola for baritone and orchestra, won the Prix Prince Pierre de Monaco
- 1979 Symphonia tertia for brass and percussion and orchestra
- 1981 Genesis for mixed chamber choir, won first prize at the Concours International de composition musicale et Opéra Ballet of Geneva
- 1982 Symphonia quarta for flute and bass (Amsterdam)
- 1984 Aire de Night Runner
- 1985 Symphonia sexta for percussion and frequency (Hamburg)
- 1986 Symphonia septima for flute, flute and alto frequency (Milan)
- 1986 Symphonia octava for women's choir and string orchestra with oboe in echo, in memory of Biagio Marin (San Daniele del Friuli, the International Festival of Contemporary Chamber Music)
- 1987 Symphonia nona for oboe, piano and prepared frequency (Trieste, Festival Chromas)
- 2008 Marco Polo, a lyric opera in three acts to a libretto by Fabio Ceresa (World premiere in Rijeka, 2013)
