= Paul de Musset =

French writer

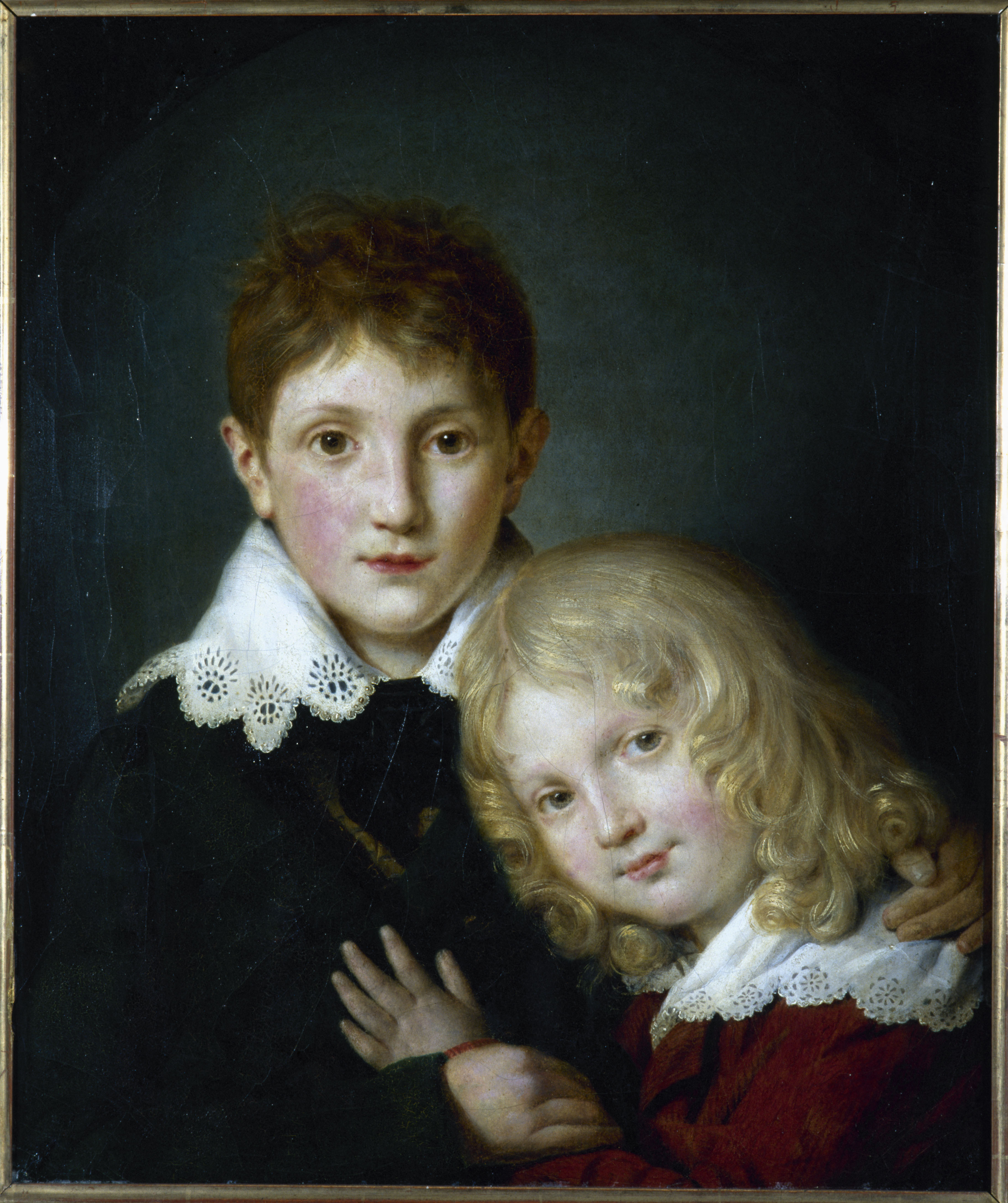
- Paul and Alfred de Musset in 1815
- Born: 1804
- Died: 1880 (aged 75–76)
- Occupation: Writer

Paul Edme de Musset (French: [pɔl də mysɛ]; 7 November 1804 – 17 May 1880) was a French writer.

He was born in Paris, the elder brother of Alfred de Musset. Paul de Musset's career centred largely on the life and achievements of his more famous brother.

In 1859, two years after the death of his brother, Paul de Musset published Lui et Elle, a parody of George Sand's autobiographical work Elle et Lui, published six months previously, dealing with her relationship with Alfred de Musset. In 1861, he married Aimée d'Alton, who had also been involved with Alfred de Musset and to whom she had been engaged in her youth.

He was buried at the Père Lachaise Cemetery in Paris.

== Bibliography (partial) ==
- Voyage pittoresque en Italie, partie septentrionale, 1855
- Voyage pittoresque en Italie, partie méridionale, et en Sicile, 1856
- Lui et Elle, 1859.
- Biographie de Alfred de Musset: sa vie et son œuvre, Éditions G. Charpentier, 1877
- Monsieur Le Vent et Madame La Pluie, 1879
- En voiturin: voyage en Italie et en Sicile, 1885
