= Andréa Guiot =

French operatic soprano (1928–2021)

- Andréa Guiot, 1960s
- Born: 11 January 1928; Garons, France
- Died: 15 February 2021 (aged 93); Nîmes, France
- Education: Conservatoire de Paris
- Occupations: Operatic soprano; Academic teacher
- Organizations: Opéra-Comique; Opéra de Paris; Conservatoire de Paris
- Awards: Ordre national du Mérite; Ordre des Arts et des Lettres

Andréa Guiot (English: /ɡiːˈjoʊ/ ghee-YOH, French: [ɑ̃dʁea ɡɥijo]; 11 January 1928 – 15 February 2021) was a French operatic soprano. A long-term member of the Paris opera houses, she was known internationally for leading roles especially in the French repertoire, such as Gounod's Mireille and Marguerite, Massenet's Manon and Micaëla in Bizet's Carmen. She appeared as Micaëla when Carmen was first performed at the Opéra de Paris in 1959, and as Mireille in the 1000th performance of the opera at the Opéra-Comique. She performed in the world premiere of Poulenc's Dialogues des Carmélites at the Teatro Colón in Buenos Aires in 1965. Among her many recordings, the 1964 Carmen conducted by Georges Prêtre, with Maria Callas in the title role and Nicolai Gedda as her lover, brought her lasting fame. She appeared at major opera house in France, Europe, and the Americas. After retiring from the stage, she was a voice teacher at the Conservatoire de Paris, succeeding Janine Micheau, her own former instructor.

== Life ==
Born in Garons (Gard), she was exposed to opera at the Arena de Nîmes at age four or five, as she remembered in a 2013 interview. Guiot studied voice with the tenor Marcello Santalouna for three years, and continued her studies of voice and opera at the Conservatoire de Paris for four years, with teachers including Janine Micheau. She won first prizes in both subjects.

She made her stage debut at the Opéra de Nancy in 1955 as Marguerite in Gounod's Faust, preparing the role simultaneously to her studies. She then joined the Opéra-Comique in Paris where she first appeared as Antonia in Offenbach's Les contes d'Hoffmann in 1956. She remained with the company from 1957 to 1972, performing the title roles of Gounod's Mireille and Marguerite, Massenet's Manon, Micaëla in Bizet's Carmen and Mimi in Puccini's La bohème, among others. She appeared as Mireille in the 1000th performance of the opera at the house in 1963. From 1959 onwards, she was also a member of the Opéra de Paris, where her first performance was again Marguerite. When Carmen was first performed at the house in 1959, she appeared as Micaëla alongside Jane Rhodes in the title role. She performed at the opera house until 1978, with Mimi among her last roles.

Guiot was in demand to perform her French leading roles internationally. In 1961, she was a guest as Mireille at the Wexford Festival in Ireland, in the same role at the Festival of Orange in 1964. She performed in Baalbek in 1962. She appeared as Marguerite at the Lyric Opera of Chicago in 1963, at the Scottish Opera Glasgow in 1964, in 1965 at the Vienna State Opera, the San Antonio, at the Philadelphia Opera.

She performed at Carnegie Hall in New York City in a concert performance of Poulenc's Dialogues des Carmélites, and took part in the staged world premiere of the opera at the Teatro Colón in Buenos Aires in 1965, returning for Euridice in Gluck's Orfeo ed Euridice the following year. She frequently performed at the Opéra du Rhin in Strasbourg, especially in Italian repertoire, as Desdemona in Verdi's Otello in 1973, as Puccini's Madama Butterfly in 1974, as Elisabetta in Verdi's Don Carlos in 1975, and the same year as Micaëla at the Jersey State Opera in Newark. In France she sang regularly at major opera houses such as Bordeaux, Nice, Toulouse and Vichy. Other roles were Fiordiligi in Così fan tutte and Donna Elvira in Don Giovanni, Marzelline in Beethoven's Fidelio, Juliette in Gounod's Roméo et Juliette, Verdi's La traviata and Alice Ford in Falstaff, Teresa in Benvenuto Cellini by Berlioz and Liu in Puccini's Turandot.

Guiot officially retired from the stage in Strasbourg in 1975, as Elisabetta. From 1977, she was a professor at the Conservatoire de Paris, succeeding her teacher Janine Micheau, where the soprano Valérie Millot was among her students. She also taught in Lyon, Marseille, Montpellier, Strasbourg and Toulouse. She was a Chevalier in the Ordre national du Mérite and Commandeur of the Ordre des Arts et des Lettres.

Guiot died from COVID-19 in Nîmes at age 93 during the pandemic in France.

== Recordings ==
Guiot's 1964 recording of Carmen, conducted by Georges Prêtre, with Maria Callas in the title role and Nicolai Gedda as Don José, was included in 2007 in a CD Maria Callas Opera Highlights. A reviewer described her as "a bright-toned but pleasing Micaela". A reviewer who compared recordings of Carmen in 2017, wrote her performance on a very French version that "she gives Micaëla the gutsy profile she too often lacks, especially in her main aria which she delivers in a big, slightly edgy and very positive manner rather than the usual wilting appeal, and I like it."

- Charpentier's Louise, as Camille (Philips)
- Bizet's Carmen (Georges Prêtre, Maria Callas, Nicolai Gedda, Robert Massard, Andréa Guiot), EMI Classics (2CD) (1964)
- Rossini's Guglielmo Tell, cond: Alain Lombard.
- Massenet's Hérodiade, as Salomé, cond. Albert Wolff, Mimi Aarden, Guy Fouché, Andréa Guiot, Charles Cambon, Germain Ghislain, Orchestre Radio Netherlands: 2CD Malibran recorded in 1957.
- Gounod's Mireille, cond. Giancarlo Amati, Alain Vanzo, René Bianco, Rémy Corazza: Disque VOGUE.
- Verdi's Otello, as Desdemona
- Reyer's Sigurd, excerpts, cond. Manuel Rosenthal, Guy Chauvet, Robert Massard, Jules Bastin, Ernest Blanc, Bernard Demigny, Jean Dupouy, Claude Méloni, Jean Louis Soumagnas, Nicolas Christou, Andréa Guiot, Andrée Esposito, Denise Scharley. Concert ORTF, published by Chant du Monde LDC27891719
- Messager's Véronique: Mady Mesplé, Andréa Guiot, Denise Benoît, Michel Dens, Jean-Christophe Benoît. Orch. Jean-Claude Hartemann EMI C16110175/6 (2 discs 33 rpm) – reissued as CD (2001)
