= Henri Médus =

French opera singer

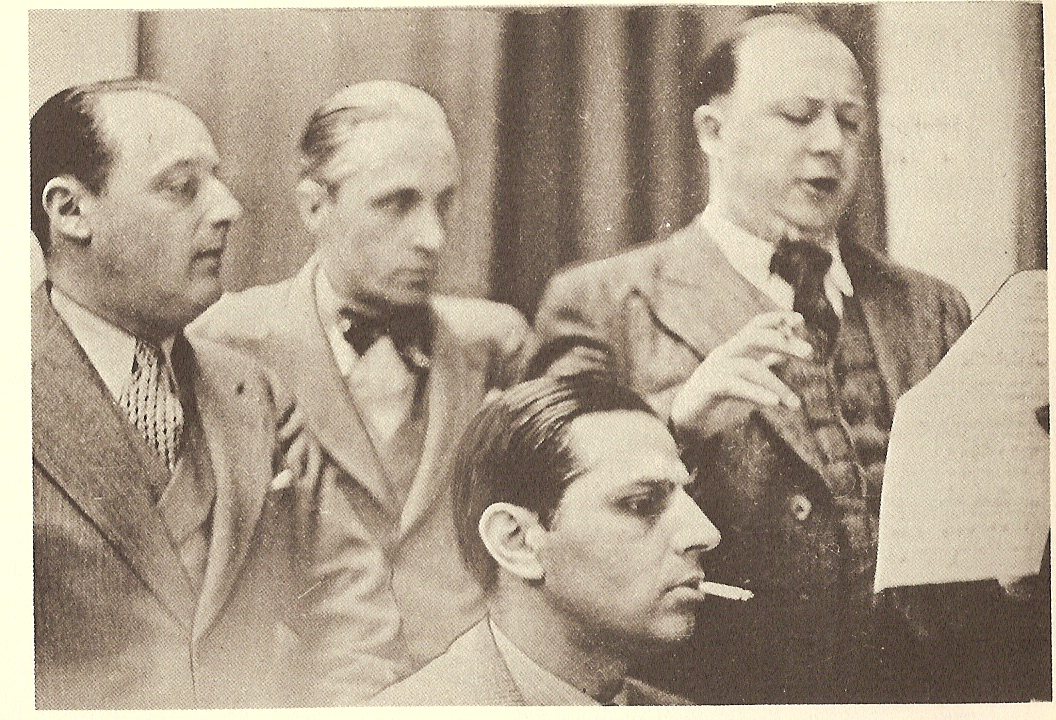
Georges Truc, Pierre Vellones, Henri Médus. Maurice Jaubert as the pianist (1937).

Henri Médus (21 October 1904 – 11 November 1985) was a French operatic bass.

A member of the troupe of the Opéra Garnier from 1933, he distinguished himself particularly in the roles of : The Magic Flute (Sarastro), Samson et Dalila (the old Hebrew man), Aida (Ramfis), Rigoletto (Sparafucile), La Juive (Cardinal de Brogni), Les Huguenots (Marcel), Die Entführung aus dem Serail (Osmin), Boris Godunov (Pimen, Varlaam), Die Walküre (Hunding), and Der Rosenkavalier (Baron Ochs).

== Biography ==
Medus was born in Guelma (Algeria) where he spent his childhood before his family settled in Algiers. He took singing lessons from Rose Elsie (soprano of the Opéra-Comique) After an audition for conductor Désiré-Émile Inghelbrecht (1880–1965), then musical director of the Algiers Opera, he was hired for the role of Colline in La Bohème. He made his stage debut on 16 October 1929 in Puccini's opera in French. After two seasons of experience in a multitude of roles, he moved to Paris and was hired as a chorister at the Théâtre du Châtelet. He studied further with Pierre-Ernest Dupré.

In 1933 he joined the Opéra Garnier and made his debut there on 25 November 1933 as Ramfis in Aida. He made his debut at the Théâtre de l'Opéra-Comique on 20 April 1941 as Arkel in Pelléas et Mélisande. He performed extensively in French and other European opera houses.

In 1939, he appeared in the film The End of the Day directed by Julien Duvivier. He appeared in world premieres in works by Reynaldo Hahn, Max d'Ollone, Henri Rabaud, and Gilbert Bécaud.

In 1959, he left the Opéra Garnier troupe while continuing his career other French theatres. He taught at the Conservatoire de Paris

In 1974, he gave his farewell performance in the role of Sarastro in The Magic Flute, which he had performed frequently throughout his long operatic career. He continued to be a member of juries for singing competitions.

He died in Toulon and is buried in Lagoubran Cemetery.

== Discography ==
Complete

- Gilbert Bécaud's L'Opéra d'Aran (the priest), with Alvino Misciano, Rosanna Carteri, Agnès Disney, Michel Llado, Louis Maurin, Peter Gottlieb, Roger Soyer, Franck Schooten, Georges Prêtre (dir.)- Pathé ASTY 136-138 3 (33 rpm)
- Berlioz'sL'Enfance du Christ (le père de famille), with Hélène Bouvier, Jean Giraudeau, Louis Noguéra, Michel Roux, André Cluytens (dir.) – juin 1951 – DTX 101-102
- Bizet's Carmen (Zuniga), with Suzanne Juyol, Libero de Luca, Julien Giovannetti, Jacqueline Cauchard, Denise Boursin, Marcel Enot, Jean Vieuille, Albert Wolff (dir.)
- Saint-Saëns's Samson et Dalila (The Hebrew old man), with José Luccioni, Hélène Bouvier, Paul Cabanel, Charles Cambon, Louis Fourestier (dir.) – 1946 – EMI 5 65263 2 / rééd. Naxos historical 8.110063-64 (2 CD)
- Emmanuel Bondeville's The School for Husbands (un clerc de nuit) with Mado Robin, Agnès Disney, Louis Musy, Jean Giraudeau, Xavier Depraz, Robert Massard, Serge Rallier, Pierre Giannotti, André Philippe. Albert Wolff conducting – DECCA FAT 133518 – Grand prix du disque 1954
- Weber's Oberon (le calife), with Constantina Araujo, Rita Gorr, Denise Duval, Martha Angelici, Georges Noré, Raphaël Romagnoni, Pierre Germain, Charles Paul, Marcel Clavere, Edmond Chastenet, Paul Finel, Max Conti, Alain Vanzo, André Philippe, Jacqueline Cauchard, André Cluytens – Live Opéra Garnier – Malibran – 1955

Extracts, selections

- Adam's Si j'étais roi (Prince Kadoor), with René Bianco, Liliane Berton, Andrée Gabriel, André Mallabrera, Bernard Alvy, Richard Blareau (dir.) – Musidisc 203002 / reissue Accord 4762104 (2 CDs)
- Lecocq's La Fille de madame Angot (Louchard), with Colette Riedinger, Suzanne Lafaye, Georgette Spanellys, Gabriel Bacquier, Louis Musy, Michel Cadiou, Richard Blareau (dir.) – January 1963 – Decca
- Meyerbeer's Les Huguenots (Urbain), with Renée Doria, Jeanne Rinella, Guy Fouché, Simone Couderc, Adrien Legros, Jean Allain (dir.) – Pléiade P3085/86 (33 rpm) / reissue. Malibran Music MR 581 – Recorded in 1953 at Théâtre de l'Apollo.
- Les Basses françaises, vol. 2 – Malibran Music MR 651

== Filmography ==
- La Fin du jour by Julien Duvivier (1939) with Louis Jouvet, Victor Francen, Gabrielle Dorziat, Sylvie, Michel Simon, Madeleine Ozeray, Raymone, Odette Talazac, Marie-Hélène Dasté, François Périer, Jean Coquelin. Music by Maurice Jaubert

== Bibliography and sources ==
- Stéphane Wolff, Un demi-siècle d'Opéra-Comique (1900–1950), éd. André Bonne, Paris, 1953
- Revue Le Guide du concert et du disque, years 1959–1960
- Revue L'Entracte, years 1960–1963
- Stéphane Wolff, L'Opéra au Palais Garnier (1875–1962), L'Entracte, Paris, 1962 – Reprint series Ressources, Champion-Slatkine, Geneva, 1983 ISBN 2-05-000214-9
- Étienne Ducarme et Jean Gabriel, Vingt deux années d'art lyrique à Saint-Étienne (1964–1986), Imprilux, Saint-Étienne, 1987
- Jean-Philippe Mousnier, Albert Wolff – Eugène Bigot, series Univers musical, L'Harmattan, Paris, 2001 ISBN 978-2747513678
- Georges Farret, Alain Vanzo, le Werther du palais Garnier, series Temps Mémoire, éditions Autres Temps, Paris, 2007 ISBN 978-2845213067
- Erik Baeck, André Cluytens, itinéraire d'un chef d'orchestre, Mardaga, Wavre, 2009 ISBN 978-2804700119
- Musée de l'Opéra de Vichy
