= André Mallabrera =

French opera singer

André Mallabrera (15 June 1934 – 2 October 2017) was a French tenor. Born in Oran, (then in French Algeria), he was the son of singer José Mallabrera.

After following his father into the watchmaker trade, Mallabrera undertook vocal studies at the Conservatoire d'Alger and in 1958 joined the Réunion des Théâtres Lyriques Nationaux.

His career was based at both the Opéra Comique (where he made his debut in December 1958 as Almaviva), and the Opéra in Paris (his debut being Hylas in Les Troyens in May 1962). His voice, described as 'light, with immaculate French' was particularly at home at the former house in Mireille (Vincent), La Fille de Madame Angot (Pomponnet), the title role in Le Comte Ory, and La Chauve-Souris (Alfred). In 1961 he sang Gustave in the premiere of Georges Van Parys's opera-ballet-bouffe La Belle de Paris. and took a minor rôle in the premiere of Menotti's Le Dernier Sauvage in 1963.

He sang in the first modern revival of Les Boréades on 16 September 1964 (celebrating the 200th anniversary of Rameau's death) at the Maison de la Radio in Paris, recorded for broadcast the following month; the cast included Christiane Eda-Pierre. As the Comte de Nangis he took part in a complete BBC broadcast of Chabrier's Le Roi malgré lui recorded in Manchester in 1973, conducted by Manuel Rosenthal.

== Discography ==
- 1960: Si j'étais roi, opéra comique by Adolphe Adam: role of Zéphoris. With Liliane Berton (Néméa), René Bianco (Moussol), Henri Médus (Kadoor), Pierre Heral (Zizel), Bernard Alvi (Piféar) and Andrée Gabriel (Zélide). Orchestre de la Société des concerts du Conservatoire, directed by Richard Blareau., Universal Classics, France.
- 1961: Récital André Mallabrera (operatic extracts) - with Jésus Etcheverry and orchestra: Vega
- 1962: La fille du tambour-major by Offenbach (as Griolet) with Christiane Harbell, Étienne Arnaud, Monique De Pondeau, orchestra and chorus conducted by Richard Blareau: French Decca
- 1962: La Veuve Joyeuse by Franz Lehár (Camille) with Jacques Luccioni, Géori Boué, Agnès Noël, conducted by Jacques Pastory: Vega 30 LT 13.007
- 1964: Les Contes d'Hoffmann by Offenbach (as Nathanael) with Nicolai Gedda, Orchestre de la Societé des Concerts du Conservatoire and Choeurs René Duclos conducted by André Cluytens: EMI
- 1965: La Veuve Joyeuse by Franz Lehár (Camille) with André Dassary, Nicole Broissin, Gabrielle Delourlet, conducted by Hans Killer: Vega – V 30 M 979 LP
- 1966: La Veuve Joyeuse by Franz Lehár (Camille) with Michel Dens, Micheline Dax, Suzanne Lafaye, conducted by Yvon Leenart: Pathé CPTC 2026/7
- 1968: Mozart - Missa Brevis in D Major, K. 194, with Rotraud Hansmann, Ingrid Mayr, Roger Soyer, Philippe Caillard Choir, Vienna Baroque Ensemble conducted by Theodor Guschlbauer; Musical Heritage Society – MHS 840 LP
- 1968: Excerpts from Isis and Armide by Lully; Jean François Paillard Orchestra, Musical Heritage Society
- 1969: Werther by Massenet, (role of Schmidt) with Victoria de los Ángeles and Nicolai Gedda; Orchestre de Paris conducted by Georges Prêtre, HMV
- 1970: Le Malade imaginaire (Lully/Molière) as one of the singers, with Georges Chamarat, Chorus of the Jeunesses musicales de France, Orchestre de chambre des Concerts de Paris conducted by Louis Martini - Guilde Internationale du Disque SMS 2858
- 1973: Princesse Czardas by Emmerich Kálmán (as Boni) with Willy Clément, Agnès Léger, Magda Bocher conducted by Gerhard Becker, Vogue LP – CMS 2936 30
- 1977: Faust et Hélène by Lili Boulanger, with Lyne Dourian conducted by Igor Markevitch, Concert Hall
- 1978: Orphée aux enfers by Offenbach (as Mercure). Michel Plasson conducting the Orchestre du Capitole de Toulouse, with Michel Sénéchal in the title role, Mady Mesplé as Euridice, Charles Burles, Michel Trempont, Jean-Philippe Lafont, Jane Berbié, Jane Rhodes (EMI CDS7496472).
