= Claude Méloni =

French baritone of the Paris Opera (born 1940)

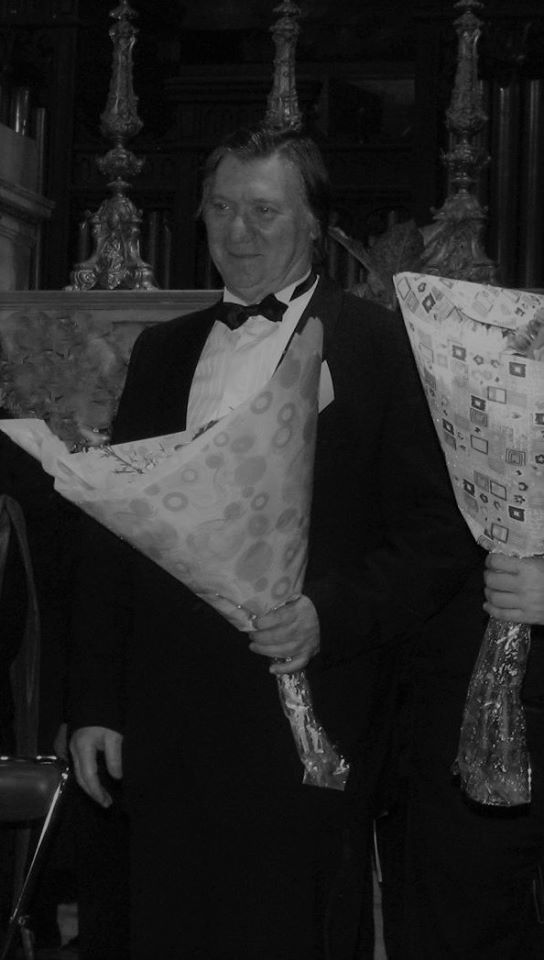
Claude Méloni

Claude Méloni (born 6 August 1940 in Marseille) is a French baritone of the Paris Opera.

== Life ==
Méloni began very early, at the Conservatoire à rayonnement régional de Marseille, to study music: piano, solfège, history of music and harmony. Later, he studied singing and opera.

After obtaining awards and fulfilling his military obligations, Méloni, on the advice of Pierre Barbizet, took the entrance exam to the Conservatoire de Paris in 1964 and was admitted to the singing class of Janine Micheau. In 1965, he was unanimously awarded a First Prize in singing and the following year a first prize in opera and comic opera. Following his results, Méloni was engaged in the opera of Lyon in the sedentary troupe and for three seasons he performed the roles of his repertoire: Marcello (La bohème), Figaro (The Barber of Seville), Ourias (Mireille), The Vicar (Albert Herring), Albert (Werther), Valentine (Faust), Brissac (Les Mousquetaires au couvent), Silvio (Pagliacci), Scharpless (Madama Butterfly), Niklausse (The Tales of Hoffmann), etc.

In October 1962, he participated in the world premiere of Jacques Emmanuel's L'Opéra d'Aran (lyrical drama), with Pierre Delanoë and Louis Amade, to music by Gilbert Bécaud at the Théâtre des Champs-Élysées.

In 1969, on the proposal of Jean Giraudeau, then director of the Réunion des théâtres lyriques nationaux and after two auditions at opera and comedy opera, Méloni was engaged in the Réunion des théâtres lyriques nationaux in the sedentary troupe. He made his debut in comic opera, in Die Fledermaus by Johann Strauss II and in opera in Puccini's Gianni Schicchi.

In comic opera, Méloni participated in the productions of the plays The Tales of Hoffmann, Mireille, Pagliacci, La Bohème, Madame Butterfly, Lakmé, The Marriage of Figaro, Platée, etc.

In opera, he participated in the productions of Les Troyens, Benvenuto Cellini, Carmen, Dialogues des Carmélites.

In 1970, the RTLN troupe was disbanded. When Rolf Liebermann became head of the Paris Opera, Méloni was hired by the administrator as part of a mini troupe of 12 solo singers. There, he had the opportunity to work with conductors such as G. Solti, C. Platane, N. Santi, S. Baudo, G. Markerras, G. Pretre, P. Boulez, A. Lombard, M. Plasson, J.C. Casadessus, P. Derveaux, R. Benzi and directors such as G. Strehler, P. Chereau, G. Lavelli, J.L. Thamin, R. Gerome, P.E. Deiber and J.C. Menotti.

Since 1969, Méloni has regularly participated in the activities of Radio France: sacred music, oratorios, lyrical seasons, contemporary music. He participated in Iphigenia in Taurida, La forza del destino, Die Soldaten, Les Mamelles de Tiresias, La Vestale, the Oresteia.

Méloni is invited by the main French opera houses: opera houses in Lyon, Bordeaux, Nice, Strasbourg, Mulhouse, Marseille (where he participated in the French stage creation of Christophe Colomb), opera houses in Nantes, Capitole de Toulouse, Avignon, Montpellier, Metz, Nancy, Albi festival, Vaison-la-Romaine.

He has also performed abroad. In London for the BBC, in Belgium in Brussels, at the Théâtre de la Monnaie and the Opéra de Wallonie, in Switzerland in Lausanne, in Italy, at La Scala in Milan for the production of Alban Berg's Lulu and in Palermo, in the Netherlands at Radio Hilversum for Padmâvatî by Albert Roussel, in Spain at the Licco in Barcelona, in Germany at Karlsruhe (Roméo et Juliette by Gounod), in Portugal at Lisbon for Iphigenie en Tauride by Gluck, and toured with the Paris Opera in the United States, New York and Washington, for Faust and The Tales of Hoffmann.

His operatic activity has also focused on contemporary composers, with whom he has created operas.

In 1978, Méloni was awarded the certificate of aptitude for the position of singing teacher in the national competition. Following this, Bernard Lefort, then director of the Paris Opera's singing school, hired him. For four years, he taught vocal technique in this school. In 1980, Pierre Barbizet offered Méloni a singing and opera class at the Conservatoire national de région de Marseille, where he taught until June 2009.

== Discography ==
- Carmen. G. Bizet. (complete opera-version). Conductor Rafael Frühbeck de Borgos. Chœur et orchestre du théâtre national de Paris. Soloists, main roles: Grace Bumbry (Carmen), Mirella Freni, (Micaëla), Kostas Paskalis (Escamillo), Jon Vickers (Don José), Viorica Cortez (Mercédès), Claude Méloni (Morales). EMI Classics (1970).
- Sigurd. E. Reyer. (complete opera-version). Conductor Manuel Rosenthal. Orchestre et chœur de l'O.R.T.F. Main roles: Guy Chauvet, Robert Massard, Jules Bastin, Andréa Guiot, Andrée Esposito, Claude Méloni, Jean Dupouy. Unique opéra corporation-VORC219. (1973).
- La Grande-Duchesse de Gérolstein. J. Offenbach. (Opérette-version intégrale). Conductor Michel Plasson. Chœur et orchestre national du capitole de Toulouse. Main roles: Régine Crespin, Mady Mesplé, Alain Vanzo, Robert Massard, Claude Méloni, Charles Burles, Tibèrre Raffalli. CBS. M2 34561. (1976).
- La vestale. G. Spontini. (complete opera-version). Conductor Roger Norrington. Orchestre Radio-lyrique et chœur de la RTF (live). Main roles: Maria Casula, Nadine Denize, Claude Méloni, Jacques Mars, Michelle le Bris. Ponto. (1976).
- Mignon. A.Thomas. (complete opera-version). Conductor Antonio de Almeida. Ambrosian choir and orchestra. Main roles: Marilyn Horne, Alain Vanzo, Ruth Welting, Frederica Von Stade, Claude Méloni, Nicola Zaccaria, André Battedou. CBS (1977).
- Cendrillon. J. Massenet. (complete opera-version). Conductor Julius Rudel. Choir and orchestra: London Philharmonic Orchestra. Main roles: Nicolai Gedda, Jane Berbié, Jules Bastin, Claude Méloni, Christian Plessis. CBS-79323-Sony-3lP-2CDs (1978).
- Lulu. A. Berg. (complete opera-version). Conductor Pierre Boulez. Ensemble and orchestra of the Paris Opera. Main roles: Teresa Stratas, Jules Bastin, Yvonne Minton, Hanna Schwartz, Robert Tear, Franz Mazura, Claude Méloni. Deutsche Grammophon (1979). Ref: 463 617-2DG-originals series-3CDs.
- Unpublished. Henri Sauguet. (Chamber music) (world premiere) aspect sentimental à la radio (1957). Extract n° 7: Claude Méloni (baritone) – Jean Sulem (alto). Recorded 16 December 1986, by France Musique. INA Mémoire vive). Ref: IMV043.
