= Simone Couderc =

French operatic mezzo-soprano

Simone Couderc (3 June 1911 – 16 November 2005) was a French operatic mezzo-soprano.

She was particularly well known in the major roles of the mezzo-soprano repertoire: Amneris (Aida), Dalila (Samson and Dalila), Orphée (Orfeo ed Euridice), Kundry (Parsifal), Carmen, Santuzza (Cavalleria rusticana), Baba la turque (The Rake's Progress), the mother (Louise), etc.

== Biography ==
Born in Cruzy (Hérault), her family settled in Rouen, and she enrolled at the École supérieure d'art et design Le Havre-Rouen to attend courses in painting, sculpture and drawing, but by chance Reynaldo Hahn heard her as she sang in a church. The composer advised her to take singing lessons. Couderc enrolled at the Conservatoire de Rouen in tenor Henri Saint-Cricq's class. After obtaining her prizes, she joined the Conservatoire de Paris in Suzanne Cesbron-Viseur's class.

She first joined the chorus of the Paris Opera, where she was also given a few small roles as in Fauré's Pénélope. She left the Paris Opera and began a solo career in her own right. During the 1944–1945 season she sang Werther (Charlotte), with José Luccioni and Margared in Le Roi d'Ys beside her former Professor Saint-Cricq at the Nice Opera. In French theatres she achieved success as Dalila, Orpheus, Azucena (Il trovatore), Léonore (La Favorite), Vénus (Lohengrin), etc.

Often compared to the Italian mezzo Ebe Stignani for the range of her voice (from do² to counter-D), she performed all over the world: at Teatro Colón of Buenos Aires, in Belgium, Athens, Algiers and Oran, Switzerland, Copenhagen, etc.

Retired from the stage in 1976, she devoted herself to teaching. She was married to critic and writer Stéphane Wolff.

Couderc died in Toulon 16 November 2005.

== Discography ==
- Georges Bizet / Jules Massenet: Mélodies - Pléiade p. 45135-39 (45 tours)
- Donizetti's La Favorite (Léonore), with Guy Fouché, Charles-Antoine Cambon - Pléiade p. 3071 (33 rpm)
- Franck's Les Béatitudes (the Virgin), with Denise Monteil, Xavier Depraz, Pierre Cochereau (dir.) - CL 340 6 (2CDs)
- Meyerbeer's Les Huguenots (Urbain), with Renée Doria, Jeanne Rinella, Guy Fouché, Henri Médus, Adrien Legros, Jean Allain (dir.) - Pléiade p. 3085/86 (33 rpm) - Recorded in 1953 at the Théâtre de l'Apollo.
- Verdi's Otello (Emilia), with Régine Crespin, José Luccioni, René Bianco. Georges Sébastian conducting - live Opéra de Paris, 1955 - Malibran Music CDRG 186 (2CD)
- Albert Wolff / Colette: Poèmes intimes, Répit - Mercury MPL 7073. Prix d'honneur de l'Académie du disque français
- Airs d'opéras français et mélodies espagnoles - Malibran Music MR 598
- Les Plus Belles Pages de l'opéra: La Favorite, Orphée, Carmen, Samson et Dalila - Pléiade p. 45132-45133- 45141 (45 rpm)

== Bibliography and sources ==
- Stéphane Wolff, Un demi-siècle d'Opéra-Comique (1900-1950), éd. André Bonne, Paris, 1953
- Revue Le Guide du concert et du disque, years 1959–1960
- Revue L'Entracte, years 1960–1961
- Stéphane Wolff, L'Opéra au Palais Garnier (1875-1962), L'Entracte, Paris, 1962; Rééd. coll. Ressources, Champion-Slatkine, Geneva, 1983 ISBN 2-05-000214-9
- Jean-Philippe Mousnier, Albert Wolff – Eugène Bigot, series Univers musical, L'Harmattan, Paris, 2001 ISBN 978-2747513678
- Erik Baeck, André Cluytens, itinéraire d'un chef d'orchestre, Mardaga, Wavre, 2009 ISBN 978-2804700119
