= Guy Fouché =

French operatic tenor (1921–1998)

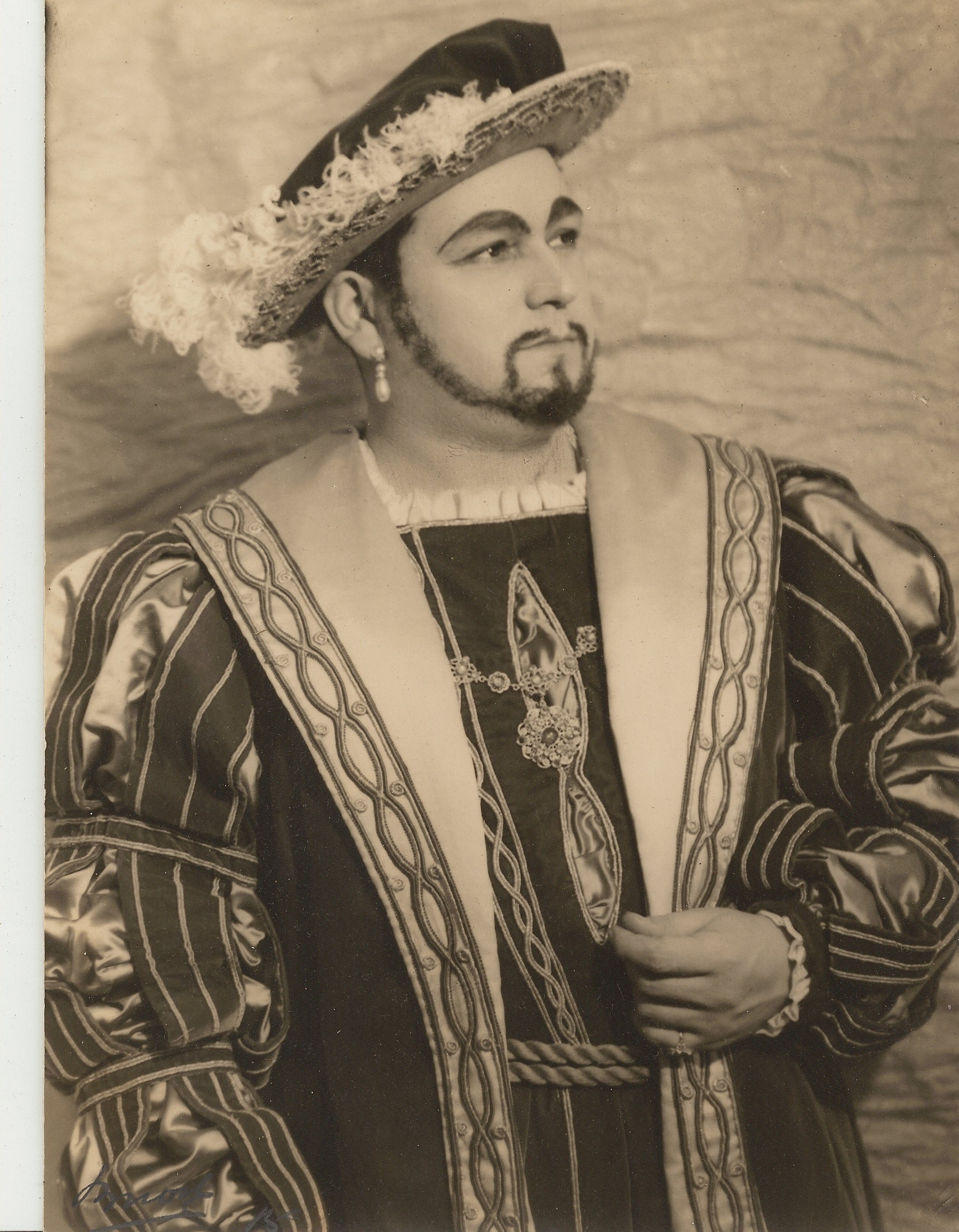
Duke of Mantua in Rigoletto

Guy Fouché (17 June 1921 – 28 May 1998) was a French operatic lyric tenor.

== Life ==
Born in Bordeaux, Fouché graduated from the Conservatoire de Bordeaux with the First Prize in Opera and opéra comique. He began his career at the Grand Théâtre de Bordeaux in 1942 in Bizet's Les Pêcheurs de perles.

He also obtained a second prize at the Conservatoire de Paris in 1943. From 1945 to 1953, he performed in French opera houses, including those of Toulouse, Marseille, Lyon, Lille, Nantes, Rennes and Bordeaux.

In 1953, he was in Oran. From 1954 to 1956, he was part of the troupe of the Opéra Royal de Wallonie in Liège before being, for six seasons, the first tenor at La Monnaie in Brussels.

Back in Oran, he sang the title role of Faust. In 1961, he moved to Toulon where he ended his career two years later.

== Quotes ==
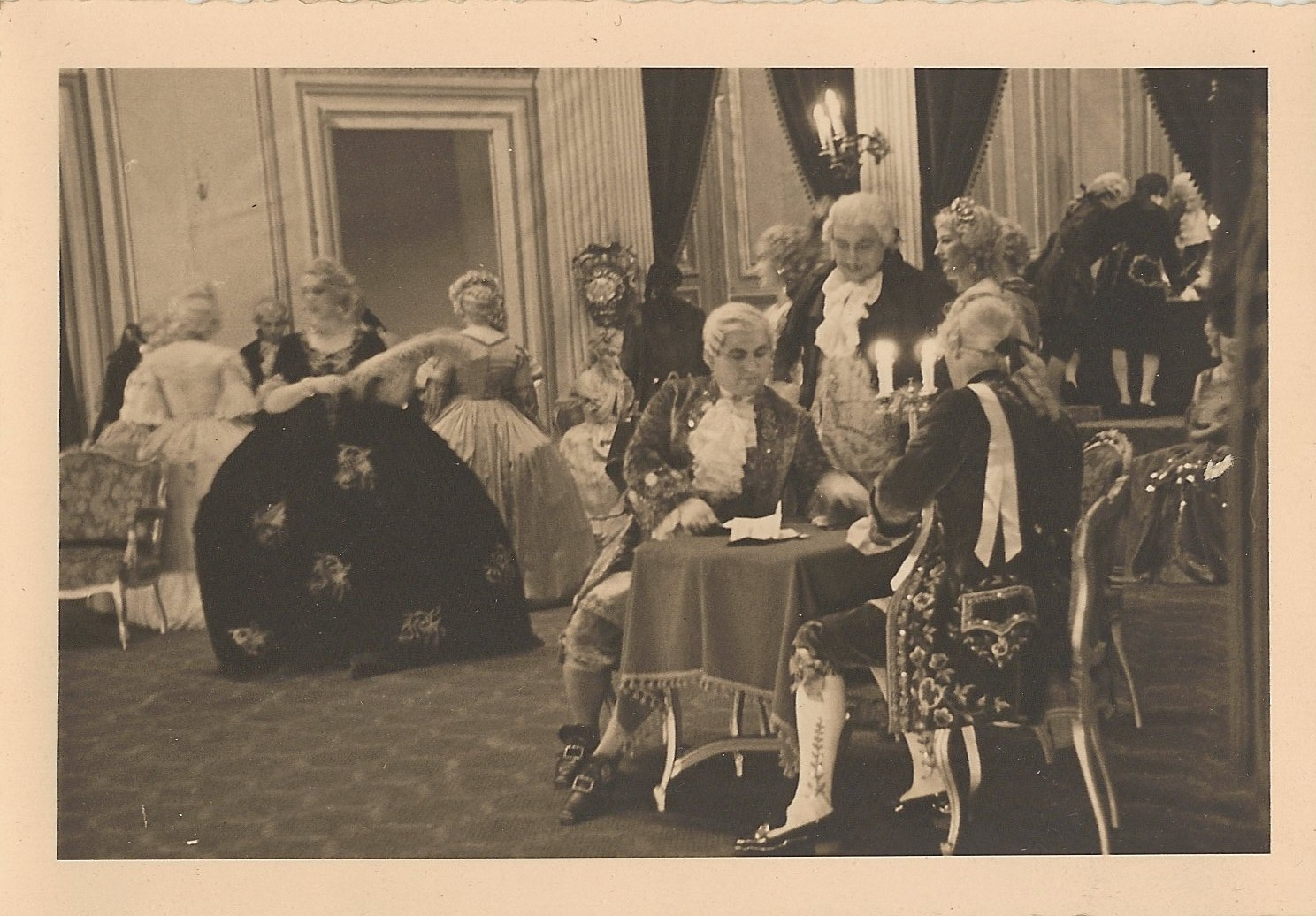
Rehearsal of Faust at La Monnaie

In the 1950s, the breed of great opera tenors seemed to be on the verge of extinction, when lovers of bel canto had the revelation of the extraordinary voice of the young Bordeaux tenor Fouché: ...(he possessed) a charming timbre, a high register of ease and disconcerting power . Fouché's High C, as in Faust, in La Bohème, is one of the most beautiful in the world. In The Damnation of Faust, he is the only protagonist who could record the love duet as it was written by Berlioz with the formidable C sharp from the chest. Finally, as a worthy successor to Nourrit, Giovanni Matteo Mario and Jean de Reszke, Fouché conferred virtue and durability to the heroic repertoire of Auber and Meyerbeer, which was thought to be near extinction for lack of a qualified interpreter.

== Discography ==
Complete

- Berlioz's La Damnation de Faust (Faust)
  - with Ninon Vallin - Pléiade P3082 (33 rpm)
  - with Régine Crespin, Michel Roux, Peter Van Der Bilt - BellaVoce BLV107.202 (CD)
- Donizetti's La Favorite (Fernand), with Simone Couderc, Charles Cambon, choir and Pasdeloup Orchestra, Jean Allain (dir.) - Pléiade P3071 / Vega 28000 - recorded in 1962
- Massenet's Hérodiade (Jean), with Andréa Guiot, Mimi Aarden, Charles Cambon, Germain Guislain, Jos Burcksen, Corneluis Kalkman - Malibran CDRG 191 (CD).
- Meyerbeer's Les Huguenots (Raoul de Nangis), with Renée Doria, Jeanne Rinella, Henri Médus, Adrien Legros, Académie chorale de Paris, Pasdeloup Orchestra, Jean Allain (dir.) - Pléiade P3085/86 (33 rpm) - recorded in 1953 at the Théâtre de l'Apollo reissued CD Accord 204592
- Verdi's Rigoletto (Duke of Mantoue), with Renée Doria, Ernest Blanc, Denise Scharley, Gérard Bourreli, Maria Valetti, Maurice Faure, André Dumas, Pierre Cruchon director - Pléiade P3076 (33 rpm) - French version

Extracts

- Puccini's La Bohème, aria of Rodolphe Que cette main est froide (act I) - Pléiade P45152 (Extended play) - French version
- Verdi's Rigoletto, arias of the Duke of Mantoue Qu'une belle (act I) and Comme la plume au vent (act III) - Pléiade P45152 (45 rpm) - French version
