= Alain Vanzo =

French opera singer and composer

- Born: April 2, 1928; Monte Carlo, Monaco
- Died: January 27, 2002 (aged 73); Paris, France
- Education: The Juilliard School
- Occupations: Operatic tenor; Composer
- Awards: Ordre des Arts et des Lettres

Alain Vanzo (2 April 1928 – 27 January 2002) was a French opera singer and composer, one of few French tenors of international standing in the postwar era. He, along with such singers as Henri Legay and the Canadian Léopold Simoneau, represented a traditional French lyric style during a period when larger Italian and German vocal styles had become popular. e became internationally known as one of the best interpretors of the title role of Benvenuto Cellini and Werther.

== Life and career ==
Vanzo was born in Monte Carlo, Monaco, the son of a Mexican father and a French mother. He started singing at a young age in the church choir. At 18, he started singing popular songs with a small band called "La Bastringue". He sang at the Théâtre du Châtelet, during the 1951–52 season, as a double for Luis Mariano in the operetta Le Chanteur de Mexico, while taking voice lessons with Rolande Darcoeur in Paris. His breakthrough came in 1954, when he participated in a singing contest at Cannes, and won the first prize.

Vanzo was then immediately invited to sing at the Opéra-Comique and at the Palais Garnier, quickly establishing himself in the standard French lyric repertory in roles such as Nadir in Les pêcheurs de perles, Gérald in Lakmé, Faust, Roméo in Roméo et Juliette, Vincent in Mireille, des Grieux in Manon, etc. He also sang the Italian repertory as the Duke in Rigoletto, Alfredo in La Traviata, Rodolfo in La bohème. He won great acclaim at the Palais Garnier in 1960, as Edgardo in Lucia di Lammermoor, opposite Joan Sutherland who was making her debut there. This was the beginning of his international career, appearing at many of the major opera houses in Europe, the Royal Opera House in London, La Monnaie in Brussels, the Liceu in Barcelona, the Vienna State Opera, etc. Vanzo also appeared in North America, on tour with the Paris Opera, singing Faust, and in South America at the Teatro Colón in Les contes d'Hoffmann. He sang at Carnegie Hall in New York, as Gennaro, in the 1965 concert version of Lucrezia Borgia, opposite Montserrat Caballé.

As the years went by, Vanzo extended his repertory to more dramatic roles, such as Arrigo in the original French version of I Vespri Siciliani, Adorno in Simon Boccanegra, Cavaradossi in Tosca, Robert in Robert le Diable, Raoul in Les Huguenots, Mylio in Le roi d'Ys, and became internationally renowned as one of the best exponents of the role of Benvenuto Cellini and Werther.

Vanzo never officially retired, singing well into his sixties, mostly in recital, and appearing frequently on French television. He left relatively few commercial recordings, the most famous being Lakmé, opposite Joan Sutherland, and conducted by Richard Bonynge.

Vanzo also composed, writing songs and two major works, the operetta Pêcheur d'Etoile which premiered at Lille, in 1972, and the lyrical drama Les Chouans, which premiered at Avignon, in 1982.

Alain Vanzo died in Paris on January 27, 2002 of complications following a stroke. He was 73.

== Honours and awards ==
- Commandeur of the Ordre des Arts et des Lettres (1987)

== Recordings ==
- Bizet: Les pêcheurs de perles – Jeanine Micheau (Leïla), Alain Vanzo (Nadir), Gabriel Bacquier (Zurga), Lucien Lovano (Nourabad), Chœur de la RTF, Orchestre Radio-Lyrique, Conductor: Manuel Rosenthal. Paris, June 25, 1959. GALA GL 100.504
- Bizet: Les pêcheurs de perles – Ileana Cotrubaș (Leïla), Alain Vanzo (Nadir), Guillermo Sarabia (Zurga), Roger Soyer (Nourabad), Paris Opera Orchestra and Chorus, Conductor: Georges Prêtre. Audio CD: EMI Cat: 367702-2
- Delibes: Lakmé – Joan Sutherland (Lakmé), Alain Vanzo (Gérald), Gabriel Bacquier (Nilakantha), Jane Berbié (Mallika), Chœurs et Orchestre National de l'Opéra de Monte Carlo, Richard Bonynge (conductor) (Decca) 1967
- Donizetti: Lucrezia Borgia – Montserrat Caballé (Lucrezia Borgia), Alain Vanzo (Gennaro), Jane Berbié (Orsini), Kostas Paskalis, Jonel Perlea, American Opera Society orchestra and chorus, Opera D'Oro 1030815, 1965
- Donizetti: Lucia di Lammermoor (French) – Mady Mesplé (Lucie), Robert Massard (Henri), Alain Vanzo (Edgard), Orchestre, Chœurs, Georges Sébastian – 1960
- Gounod: Sapho – Katherine Ciesinski (Sapho), Éliane Lublin (Glycère), Alain Vanzo, tenor (Phaon); Frédéric Vassar (Pythéas), Alain Meunier (Alcée); French Radio Chorus and New Philharmonic Orchestra; Sylvain Cambreling, Harmonia Mundi 2453/4 (LPs); 32453/4 (CDs), 1979
- Gounod: Mireille – Mirella Freni (Mireille), Alain Vanzo (Vincent), José van Dam (Ourrias), Jane Rhodes (Taven), Gabriel Bacquier (Maître Ramon), Choeur et Orchestre du Capitole de Toulouse, Michel Plasson; (EMI) 1979.
- Massenet: Le Jongleur de Notre-Dame – Alain Vanzo (Jean), Jules Bastin (Boniface), Marc Vento (Le Prieur), L'Opéra de Monte-Carlo, Roger Boutry – 1978 (EMI)
- Meyerbeer: Fourteen Mélodies – Alain Vanzo, ténor; Josée Fabre, piano. Coriolan: GPP000016 released 2002.
- Offenbach: La Périchole – Régine Crespin (La Périchole), Alain Vanzo (Piquillo), Jules Bastin (Don Andrès de Ribeira). Opéra du Rhin Chorus, Strasbourg Philharmonic Orchestra, Alain Lombard. Erato. 1976
- Puccini: La bohème (French) – Renée Doria (Mimì), Alain Vanzo (Rodolfo), Robert Massard (Marcello), conducted by Erasmo Ghiglia (1960)

== Sources ==
- Alain Pâris, Dictionnaire des interprètes et de l'interpretation musicale au XX siècle (2 vols), Ed. Robert Laffont (Bouquins, Paris 1982, 4th ed. 1995, 5th ed. 2004). ISBN 2-221-06660-X
- D. Hamilton (ed.),The Metropolitan Opera Encyclopedia: A Complete Guide to the World of Opera (Simon and Schuster, New York 1987). ISBN 0-671-61732-X
- Roland Mancini and Jean-Jacques Rouveroux, (orig. H. Rosenthal and J. Warrack, French edition), Guide de l’opéra, Les indispensables de la musique (Fayard, 1995). ISBN 978-2-213-59567-2
- The Complete Dictionary of Opera & Operetta, James Anderson ISBN 0-517-09156-9
