= Gabriel Bacquier =

French operatic singer (1924–2020)

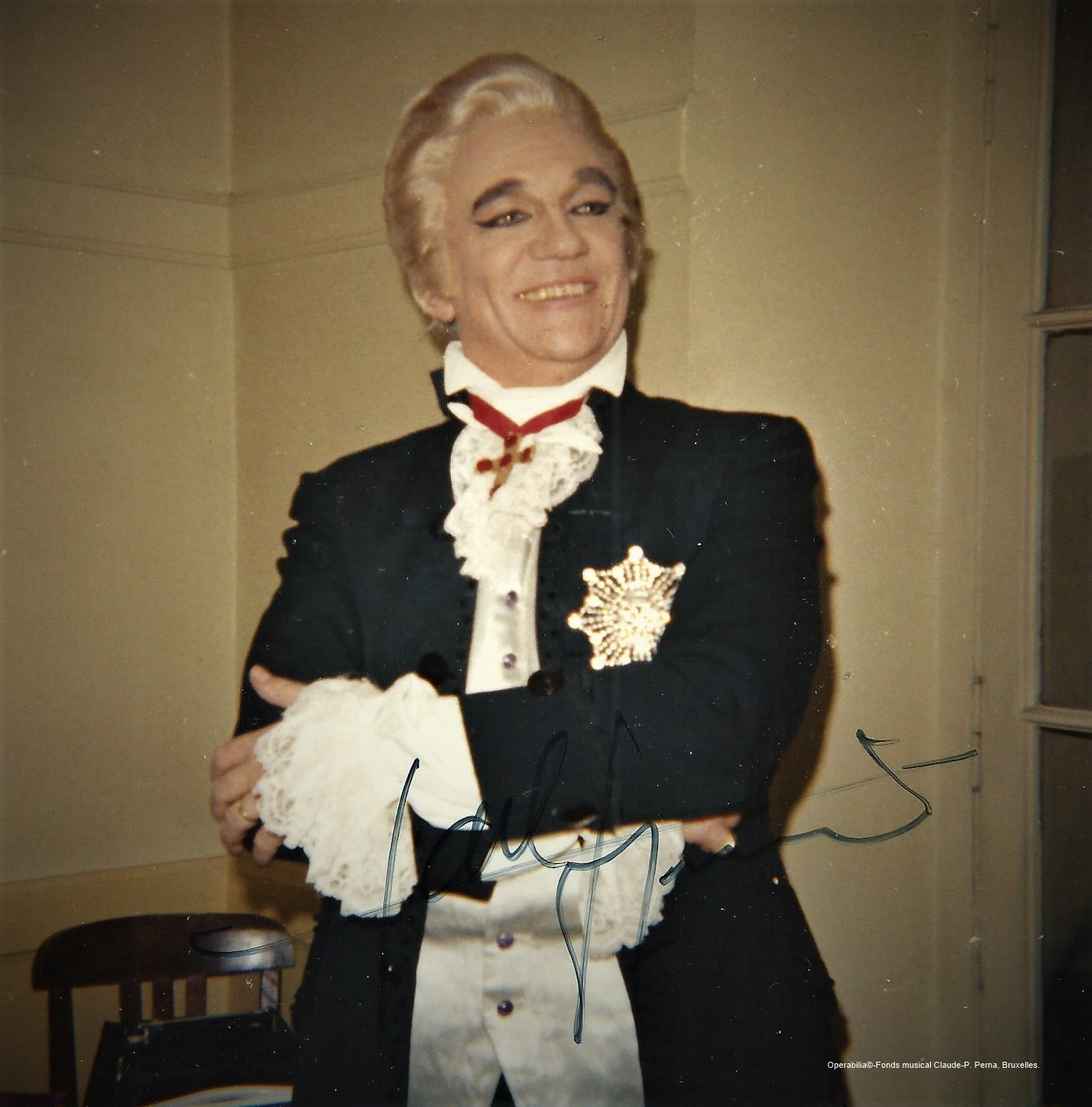
- As Scarpia in Tosca, Chicago
- Born: Gabriel Augustin-Raymond-Théodore-Louis Bacquier; 17 May 1924; Béziers, France
- Died: 13 May 2020 (aged 95); Lestre, Manche, France
- Occupation: Operatic baritone
- Awards: Légion d'Honneur; Ordre national du Mérite; Ordre des Arts et des Lettres

Gabriel Bacquier (French pronunciation: [gabʁjel bakje]; 17 May 1924 – 13 May 2020) was a French operatic baritone. One of the leading baritones of the 20th century and particularly associated with the French and Italian repertoires, he was considered a fine singing actor equally at home in dramatic or comic roles and gave regular song recitals. He was a long-term member of the Opéra-Comique and the Paris Opera, but forged a long career internationally at leading opera houses in Europe and the U.S. His large discography spans five decades, and he was considered as “the ambassador of French song”.

== Early life and studies ==
Born Gabriel Augustin-Raymond-Théodore-Louis Bacquier in Béziers, France, on 17 May 1924, he was the only child of railway employees. As a young boy, he was fascinated by everything to do with singing: records, broadcasts and photos of singers. Leaving school aged 14, he worked at his uncle's print-shop, while studying in Montpellier to become a commercial artist, but during the Vichy regime, to avoid the round-ups and deportations by the Service du travail obligatoire, his parents arranged for him to do national service in the Chantiers de Jeunesse on the railways during the Occupation.

As a teenager he took voice lessons with a Madame Bastard in Béziers in his free time and made his operatic debut during the war as Ourrias in Gounod's Mireille in the town arena. After World War II, he entered the Paris Conservatoire, receiving a scholarship because of his family's modest means, and graduated in 1950. He was a contemporary of, and shared his student life with, future leading French singers Régine Crespin, Xavier Depraz, Michel Sénéchal and Michel Roux. In his final year, the director of the Conservatoire, Claude Delvincourt, allowed him leave to work at the Opéra de Nice in the 1949–50 season, singing small roles in operas and operettas; this along with regular singing spots in cinemas gave him important experience and income before his next career steps. Having already gained a first prize for opéra comique in his penultimate year, he won first prize for singing and second prize for opera at the conclusion of his formal studies. Around this time he also took a course in dramatic art.

== Career in France and Belgium ==
He joined the opera company of José Beckmans in 1950, and was a member of La Monnaie in Brussels from 1953 until 1956, making his debut in the title role of Rossini's Il barbiere di Siviglia. There he sang the French repertory, both in opera (Gounod's Faust, Delibes' Lakmé, Massenet's Manon and Werther) and in operetta (Angélique, La belle Hélène, Les cloches de Corneville, Miss Heylett, Monsieur Beaucaire). He also appeared there in Puccini's La bohème and Madama Butterfly, and in Smetana's The Bartered Bride. While at the Monnaie, the French soprano Martha Angelici, whose husband was François Agostini, director of the Opéra-Comique at the time, sang in Les pêcheurs de perles with him; she suggested that he audition for the Paris company, which accepted him.

Bacquier made his debut at the Opéra-Comique in Paris in 1956, as Sharpless in Madama Butterfly, soon followed by Alfio in Cavalleria rusticana and Albert in Werther. Having stood in at short notice to sing Verdi's Rigoletto at the Paris Opera, after his transfer to that house he made his official debut at the Palais Garnier on 21 September 1959 as Germont in Verdi's La traviata, and was soon seen as Valentin, Mercutio and again as Rigoletto. In 1960 he sang as Scarpia in Puccini's Tosca opposite Renata Tebaldi, and went with the company to Venice, appearing as Ramiro in L'heure espagnole. In 1960, he made his first appearance at the Aix-en-Provence Festival as Mozart's Don Giovanni, and the first time an opera from the festival had been broadcast around Europe by the Eurovision network. Seen in Vienna and London, these performances led to engagements outside France and the start of his international career.

== International fame ==
He was invited to the Glyndebourne Festival in 1962, to sing Count Almaviva in Mozart's Le nozze di Figaro. From 1963, Bacquier sang regularly at the Vienna State Opera and La Scala in Milan. From 1964 he appeared at the Royal Opera House in London, where his roles included Sir Richard Forth in Bellini's I puritani alongside Joan Sutherland in 1964, Almaviva in 1965, Scarpia in 1966, Malatesta in Donizetti's Don Pasquale in 1973, Doctor Bartolo in Il barbiere in 1975, and aud in Debussy's Pelléas et Mélisande in 1982. He also appeared in the televised Royal Silver Jubilee Gala in 1977.

Bacquier made his American debut at a Carnegie Hall concert, after which his stage debut was with the Lyric Opera of Chicago in 1962, as the High Priest in Samson et Dalila by Saint-Saëns, which was also his debut role at the Metropolitan Opera in New York City on 17 October 1964. He performed there for 18 seasons, as one of only a few French singers, including the premiere of a new production of Tosca with Birgit Nilsson and Franco Corelli. He also sang frequently at the Philadelphia Lyric Opera Company between 1963 and 1968, making his debut on 22 February 1963 as Zurga in Bizet's Les pêcheurs de perles with Ferruccio Tagliavini as Nadir and Adriana Maliponte as Leïla. His other roles in Philadelphia included Nilakantha in Lakmé opposite Joan Sutherland in the title role, Germont with Sutherland as Violetta and John Alexander as Alfredo, Iago in Verdi's Otello, Scarpia, and Escamillo in Bizet's Carmen. He made his debut at the San Francisco Opera in 1971 as Michele in Puccini's Il tabarro. In 1978, he appeared at the Metropolitan Opera as Golaud alongside Teresa Stratas as Mélisande. A reviewer of The New York Times noted "the precise, fluent inflection of his singing, which has to be delicate and yet weighted with feeling". Thomas Allen classified Bacquier as a 'singer-actor': "...a voice and a knowledge of his body language such that one can be forgiven for asking the question 'Is this an actor singing or a singer acting?'".

Though closely associated with the French repertory, especially Golaud, Bacquier resisted being typecast as a 'French baritone' and added many Italian roles to his repertory, in addition to those already mentioned, such as the Verdi roles Renato in Un ballo in maschera, Melitone in La forza del destino, Posa in Don Carlos and Falstaff, as well as comic roles such as Mozart's Leporello in Don Giovanni and Alfonso in Cosi fan tutte, among others. At the New York Met in 1982, a critic noted that the "best performance [in Il Barbiere di Siviglia] came from Gabriel Bacquier as a classic Bartolo. Every phrase, every gesture, every note, was beautifully timed and projected. It seemed improbable that last season's Covent Garden Golaud could be so marvellous a Bartolo". In 1975 a critic reviewing Donizettis's L'elisir d'amore commented that "broad humour is quite foreign to Bacquier's nature ... his doctor [Dulcamara] is a serious Archie Rice type, no caricature but a real man weighed down by his own charlatanism and basically sad that mankind is so gullible". Rare tentatives in non-French and Italian repertoire came with Wolfram in Tannhäuser by Wagner, praised by André Pernet, and the title role in Boris Godunov by Mussorgsky in 1971 (both sung in French translation). By the 1980s, Bacquier had arranged his repertory to suit the evolution of his voice, from a high tessitura to low, and concentrated on roles he felt were more substantial. Many of his portrayals are preserved in an extensive discography. For The Record of Singing, Volume 5 : 1953–2007 (from the LP to the digital era), his recording of "Une puce gentille" from Berlioz's La damnation de Faust was included on disc 7.

== Premieres and song ==
Bacquier also created the title roles of Jean-Pierre Rivière's Pour un Don Quichotte at La Piccola Scala (Milan) on 10 March 1961, and Daniel-Lesur's Andréa del Sarto at the Opéra de Marseille in 1969, where one critic wrote "...rarely has a singer shown such complete mastery, both as a vocalist and as an actor. As the action unfolds itself, so does Bacquier's involvement grow and the death scene was memorable." Other world premieres included Maurice Thiriet's La véridique histoire du Docteur and Menotti's Le Dernier Sauvage at the Opéra-Comique. In May 1980 he created the title role in the premiere of an opera Cyrano de Bergerac by Paul Danblon, as part of the commemoration of the 150th anniversary of the founding of the state of Belgium, in Liège at the Opéra Royal de Wallonie. He sang in the premieres of two operas by Jean-Michel Damase, L'Escarpolette on television in 1982, and the comédie musicale L'as-tu revue? at the Opéra-Comique in 1991, and in Les Bals de Paris by Émile Desfossez, and Le Capitaine et la mort by Maurice Fouret. He made his last stage appearance in Paris in June 1994, with a final performance of Don Pasquale at the Opéra-Comique. He appeared as Arkel in Pelléas et Mélisande in Marseille in 1995, and took part in later public performances, such as Somarone in concert performances of Berlioz's Béatrice et Bénédict in Toulouse and Paris in February 2003, and as the reciter in Françaix's Les Inestimables Chroniques du bon géant Gargantua in Vichy in December later that year.

He was also active in the field of mélodies, and made recordings of songs by Maurice Ravel, Déodat de Séverac, Marc Berthomieu, Francis Poulenc and others. Two live recitals of mélodies from 1961 and 1972 were issued on CD in 1987. In 2007, Bacquier recorded thirteen songs by the actor and songwriter Pierre Louki, with musicians directed by Jacques Bolognesi. He recorded six Poulenc songs, accompanied by Jacques Février, for French television in June 1964, subsequently issued on DVD.

== Later career ==
Bacquier was also active as a teacher, first at the vocal school of the Paris Opera and later at the Paris Conservatory until 1987, and from 2001 at the Académie de Musique de Monaco, where he directed student productions. In 2007, Bacquier recorded thirteen songs by actor and songwriter Pierre Louki, directed by Jacques Bolognesi. He is featured as one of the interviewees in the book by Sylvie Milhau Doucement les Basses ossia Dîner avec Gabriel Bacquier, José van Dam et Claudio Desderi. He was one of the lead signatories to a petition in 2008 Appel à la Refondation des Troupes de Théâtre Lyrique to defend and promote French singing.

Bacquier died on 13 May 2020 in his home at Lestre in the Manche department, only four days shy of turning 96.

Christophe Ghristi, artistic director of the Théâtre du Capitole, said of him: "A southern personality who had an animal presence on stage. He was one of the rare French singers of that time to have had such an international career".

== Awards and distinctions ==
Bacquier received numerous awards and distinctions in his native France, such as Chevalier de la Légion d'Honneur, Officier de L'Ordre national du Mérite, Officier de L'Ordre national du Mérite Européen, Commandeur de L'Ordre des Arts et des Lettres (France) and Commandeur de L'Ordre des Arts et des Lettres (Principauté de Monaco).

Several recordings in which he sang won the Prix du Disque (L'heure espagnole, DGG, 1967; Les contes d'Hoffmann, Decca, 1972) and Enescu's Œdipe (EMI, 1984) won a Grand Prix du Disque et Prix de Ministère de la Culture. In 2004 he was awarded an Orphée d'Or Herbert von Karajan for his career, and in the same year a Lauréat des Victoires de la Musique. He also received a Médaille de la Ville de Paris.

== Selected recordings ==
The following is a selection of Bacquier's many opera recordings:

- Bizet: La jolie fille de Perth. June Anderson, Alfredo Kraus, Gino Quilico, Gabriel Bacquier (Glover), Margarita Zimmermann, Nouvel Orchestre Philharmonique. Conductor: Georges Prêtre. EMI 7475598.
- Bizet: Les pêcheurs de perles. Janine Micheau, Alain Vanzo, Gabriel Bacquier (Zurga), Chœur de la RTF, Orchestre Radio-Lyrique, Conductor: Manuel Rosenthal. Paris, 25 June 1959. GALA GL 100.504.
- Chabrier: L'Étoile. Georges Gautier, Gabriel Bacquier (Siroco), François Le Roux, Colette Alliot-Lugaz, Opéra de Lyon. Conductor: John Eliot Gardiner. EMI, 1984.
- Debussy: Pelléas et Mélisande. Gabriel Bacquier (Golaud), Michèle Command, Claude Dormoy, Orchestre de Lyon. Conductor: Serge Baudo. Eurodisc.
- Donizetti: Don Pasquale. Gabriel Bacquier (Don Pasquale), Barbara Hendricks, Gino Quilico, Luca Canonici, Opéra de Lyon. Conductor: Gabriele Ferro. Erato, 1990.
- Massenet: La Navarraise. Marilyn Horne, Plácido Domingo, Sherrill Milnes, Nicola Zaccaria, Gabriel Bacquier (Bustamente), London Symphony Orchestra, Ambrosian Opera Chorus. Conductor: Henry Lewis. RCA Red Seal, 1975
- Massenet: Manon. Beverly Sills, Gabriel Bacquier (Comte des Grieux), Gérard Souzay, Michel Trempont, New Philharmonia Orchestra. Conductor: Julius Rudel. Deutsche Grammophon 247002
- Massenet: Thaïs. Anna Moffo, Gabriel Bacquier (Athanaël), José Carreras, Ambrosian Chorus, New Philharmonia Orchestra. Conductor: Julius Rudel. RCA Red Seal, 1974
- Massenet: Don Quichotte. Nicolai Ghiaurov, Gabriel Bacquier (Sancho), Régine Crespin, Radio Suisse Romande. Conductor: Kazimierz Kord. Decca, 1978.
- Mozart: Don Giovanni. Gabriel Bacquier (Giovanni), Joan Sutherland, Pilar Lorengar, Werner Krenn, Donald Gramm, Marilyn Horne, Ambrosian Opera Chorus, English Chamber Orchestra. Conductor: Richard Bonynge. Decca 448 973–2.
- Mozart: Le nozze di Figaro. Geraint Evans, Reri Grist, Gabriel Bacquier (Conte Almaviva), Elisabeth Söderström, Teresa Berganza, New Philharmonia Orchestra. Conductor: Otto Klemperer. EMI, 1970.
- Mozart: Così fan tutte. Pilar Lorengar, Teresa Berganza, Jane Berbié, Ryland Davies, Tom Krause, Gabriel Bacquier (Alfonso), London Philharmonic Orchestra. Conductor: Georg Solti. Decca, 1973.
- Offenbach: Les contes d'Hoffmann. Plácido Domingo, Joan Sutherland, Gabriel Bacquier (Lindorf, Coppélius, Dapertutto, Dr Miracle), L'Orchestre de la Suisse Romande. Conductor: Richard Bonynge. Decca, 1971.
- Offenbach: La Périchole. Teresa Berganza, José Carreras, Gabriel Bacquier (Don Andrès), Orchestre & Choeurs du Théâtre du Capitole de Toulouse. Conductor: Michel Plasson. EMI, 1981.
- Puccini: Tosca (in French). Jane Rhodes, Albert Lance, Gabriel Bacquier (Scarpia), L'Opéra de Paris. Conductor: Manuel Rosenthal. Vega, 1960.
- Ravel: L'Heure espagnole. Jane Berbié, Gabriel Bacquier (Ramiro), Michel Sénéchal, José van Dam, Jean Giraudeau, Orchestre National de Paris, Lorin Maazel. Deutsche Grammophon, 1964.
- Rossini: Guillaume Tell. (Gabriel Bacquier (title role), Montserrat Caballé, Nicolai Gedda, Mady Mesplé, Jocelyne Taillon, Ambrosian Opera Chorus, Royal Philharmonic Orchestra. Conductor: Lamberto Gardelli. EMI.
- Verdi: Otello. Carlo Cossutta, Margaret Price, Gabriel Bacquier (Iago), Wiener Staatsoper & Philharmoniker. Conductor: Georg Solti. Decca, 1977.
- Verdi: La forza del destino. Leontyne Price, Sherrill Milnes, Plácido Domingo, Fiorenza Cossotto, Gabriel Bacquier (Fra Melitone), John Alldis Choir, London Symphony Orchestra. Conductor: James Levine. RCA Red Seal, 1976.

== Film and television ==
Bacquier appeared in the 1976 film La Grande Récré (as 'Caruso'), and in a cameo singing role in the wedding scene of the 1986 film Manon des Sources. He also starred in the 1979 film of Falstaff directed by Götz Friedrich (sound recorded Vienna 1978, filmed Berlin 1979), and the studio film of The Love for Three Oranges in 1989.

Oussenko also lists many television broadcasts involving Bacquier, from Aix, Paris, New York, Rouen and Geneva, of Don Giovanni, Così fan tutte, Pelléas et Mélisande, Andréa del Sarto, Tosca, L'elisir d'amore, Don Pasquale, Louise, Cyrano de Bergerac, Gianni Schicchi, La forza del destino, Il Barbiere di Siviglia, Don Quichotte, La Périchole, La vie parisienne, La belle Hélène, L'as-tu revue, and Les Mousquetaires au couvent, dating from 1960 to 1992.
