= Si j'étais roi =

Comic opera by Adolph Adam

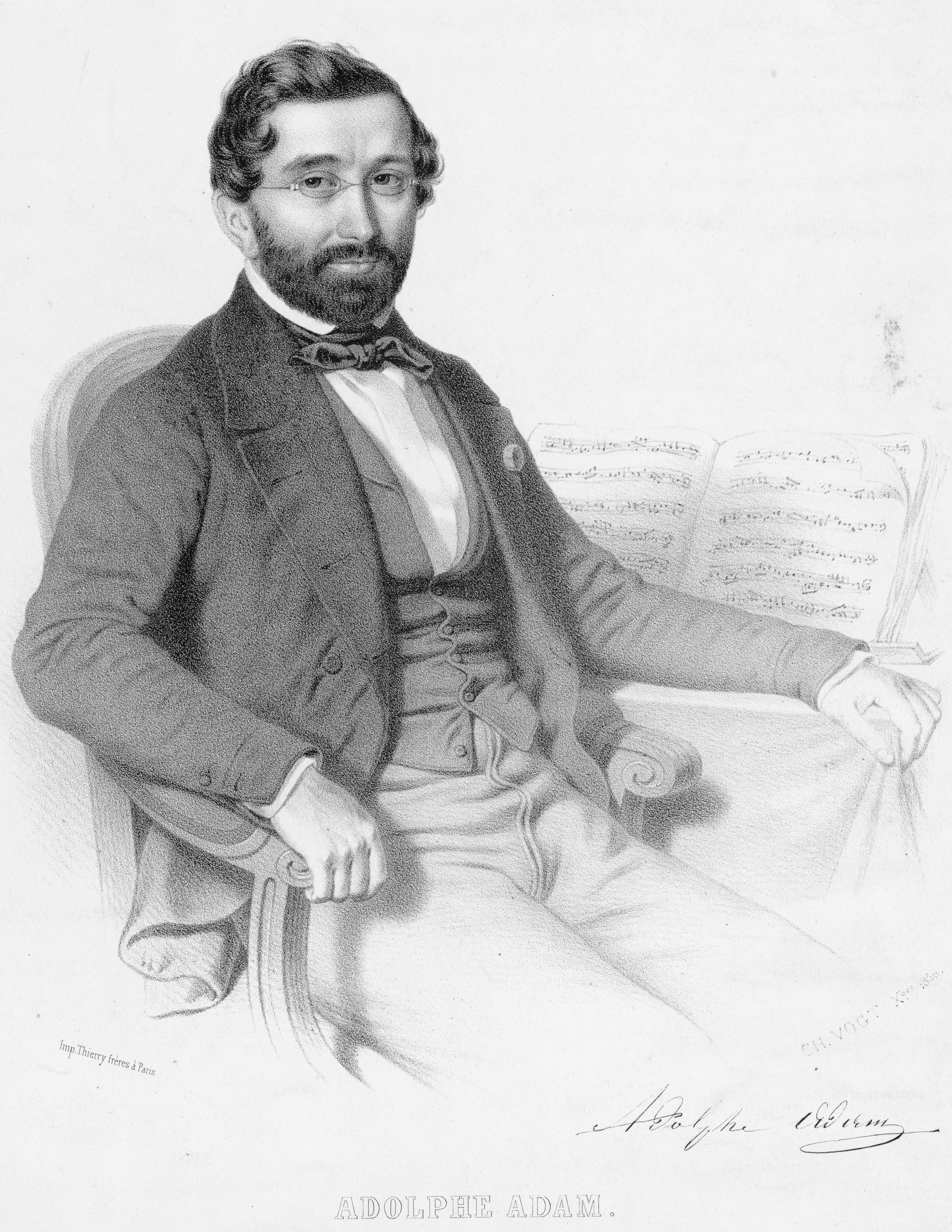
Adolphe Adam, Lithograph, 1850

Si j'étais roi (French pronunciation: [si ʒetɛ ʁwa], lit. 'If I Were King') is an opéra comique in three acts by Adolphe Adam. The libretto was written by Adolphe d'Ennery and Jules-Henri Brésil. It was first performed in Paris at the Théâtre Lyrique (Théâtre-Historique, Boulevard du Temple) on 4 September 1852, opening with a dual cast to allow performance on successive evenings (it made up half of all performances at the Théâtre Lyrique in the last four months of the year and reached over 170 performances in its first ten years). The production was considered lavish, with expensive costumes and jewels being worn by the cast.

It was then staged in Brussels (1853), New Orleans (1856), Turin (1858) and Soerabaya (1864).

Though less popular than Le postillon de Lonjumeau, it is often regarded as Adam's finest work. The well-developed overture was once very popular, particularly on recordings. Vocal highlights include the soprano air "De vos nobles aïeux" and the couplets for baritone "Dans le sommeil, l'amour".

== Roles ==
Role	Voice type	Premiere Cast, 4 September 1852 (Conductor: — )
Néméa, Princess of Goa, daughter of the King of Goa	soprano	Pauline-Désirée Colson
Zélide, Zéphoris's sister	soprano	Louise Rouvroy
Zéphoris, a fisherman	tenor	Tallon
Moussol, King of Goa, father of Néméa	baritone	Pierre-Marie Laurent
Prince Kadoor, minister of the king	bass	François-Marcel Junca
Piféar, a fisherman	tenor	Horace Menjaud, fils
Zizel, beach policeman	bass	Ernest Leroy
Atar, a minister	bass	Lemaire
Fishermen, fishermen’s wives, the court, servants, citizens, counsellors, priests

== Instrumentation ==
The opera is scored for piccolo, flute, two oboes, two clarinets, two bassoons, four horns, two trumpets, three trombones, timpani, triangle, bass drum, cymbals, snare drum, bells (or glockenspiel), harp and strings.

== Synopsis ==
=== Act I ===
At dawn on the beach; Zizel has to be bribed to stop him arresting some of the fishermen. A few months before the action starts, Zéphoris, a young fisherman in Goa, had rescued a young woman from drowning, recovering the ring which she lost. Zéphoris recounts the story to his sister Zélide and his friend Piféar; when King Moussol and his court pass, Zéphoris recognises the beautiful woman as a princess in the retinue : Néméa. Prince Kadoor notices Zéphoris and forces him not to reveal to Néméa the secret of her ring and saviour. After Kadoor has convinced the king that he saved the princess (as she has sworn to wed the man who saved her - although she dislikes Kadoor), he demands that Zéphoris leave the village. Zéphoris is heartbroken, and lies down and dreams that he may become a king - rather than a poor fisherman - so that he could be worthy of marrying Néméa. The king, hearing this and seeing him asleep, decides to play a game, and has him carried off to the palace.

=== Act II ===
Zéphoris awakens the next day in the throne room of the palace of Moussol in royal garments, and everyone treats him like a king. He enjoys the situation, convenes his court and passes laws to assist the fishermen. However, announcing his marriage to the princess Néméa goes too far, and the king gives a sleeping draught to Zéphoris and has him returned to his hut.

=== Act III ===
In Tableau 1, Zéphoris, back in his poor fishing-hut, believes he must have dreamt everything. His sister Zélide tries to console him, but Néméa arrives to tell him that it was not a dream, and when Kadoor enters with assassins to rid himself of his rival she declares that she is in love with Zéphoris. The king and his court arrive on the scene and discover Kadoor’s treachery to conspire with the Portuguese warships off the coast.
Tableau 2 is set in a square in the town of Goa; after victory over the Portuguese, the king agrees to the union of Néméa and Zéphoris.

== Selected recording ==
Si j'étais roi. Liliane Berton (Néméa), André Mallabrera (Zéphoris), René Bianco (Moussol), Henri Médus (Kadoor), Pierre Heral (Zizel), Bernard Alvi (Piféar), Andrée Gabriel (Zélide). Orchestre de la Société des Concerts du Conservatoire, conducted by Richard Blareau (1960). Universal Classics, France.
