= Cruzy =

- Commune
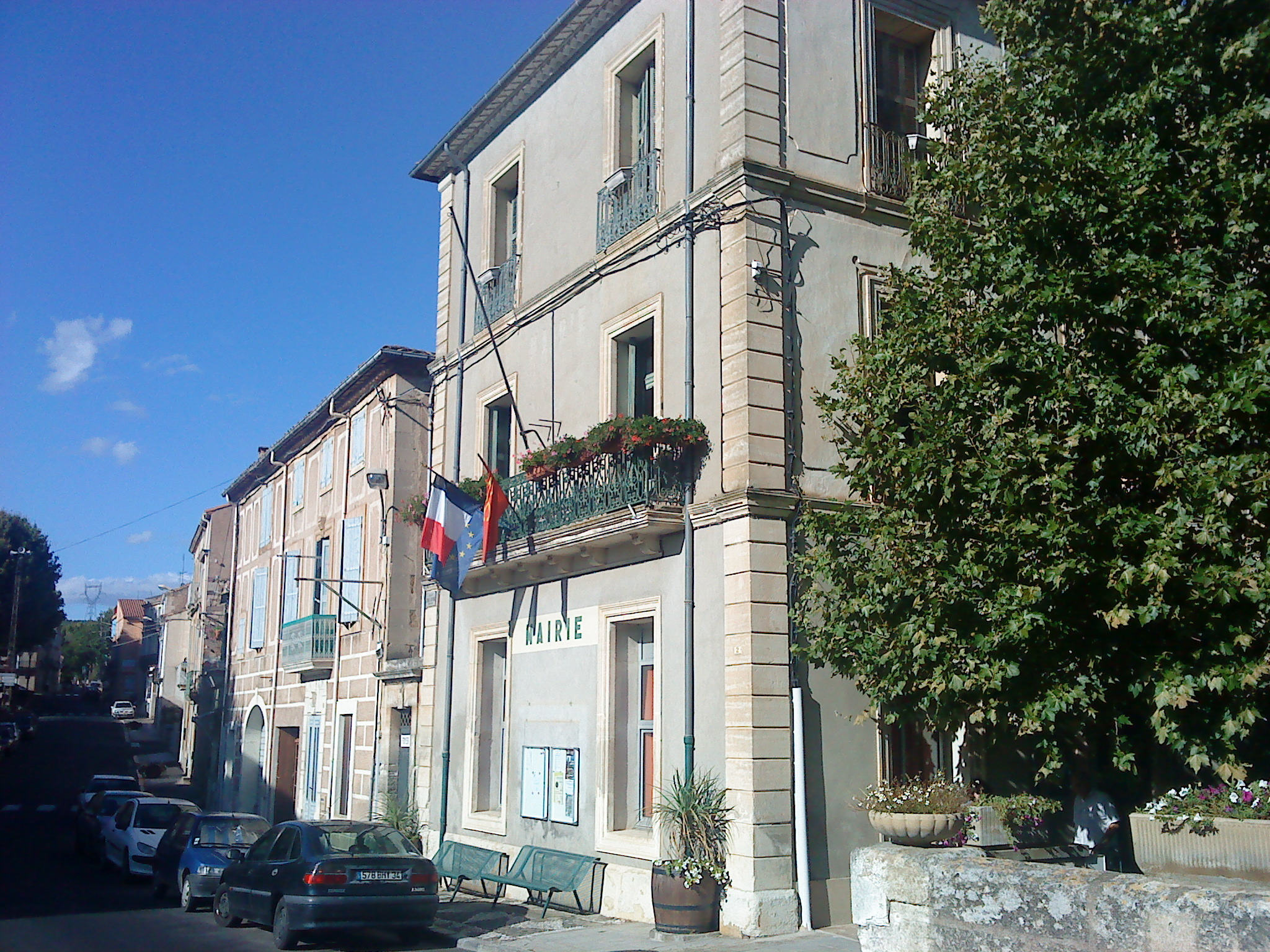
- Town hall

- Coat of arms
- Location of Cruzy
- Location within France Location within Occitanie
- Coordinates: 43°21′24″N 2°56′29″E
- Country: France
- Region: Occitania
- Department: Hérault
- Arrondissement: Béziers
- Canton: Saint-Pons-de-Thomières

Government
  - Mayor (2020–2026): Rémy Affre
- Area^{1}: 25.85 km^{2} (9.98 sq mi)
- Elevation: 92 m (302 ft)
- Highest elevation: 263 m (863 ft)
- Lowest elevation: 21 m (69 ft)
- Population (2023): 992
  - Density: 38.4/km^{2} (99.4/sq mi)
- Time zone: UTC+01:00 (CET)
  - Summer (DST): UTC+02:00 (CEST)
- INSEE/Postal code: 34092 /34310
- ^{1} French Land Register data, which excludes lakes, ponds, glaciers > 1 km^{2} (0.386 sq mi or 247 acres) and river estuaries.

Cruzy (French pronunciation: [kʁyzi]; Languedocien: Crusi) is a commune in the Hérault department in southern France.

The mezzo-soprano Simone Couderc was born in Cruzy on 3 June 1911.

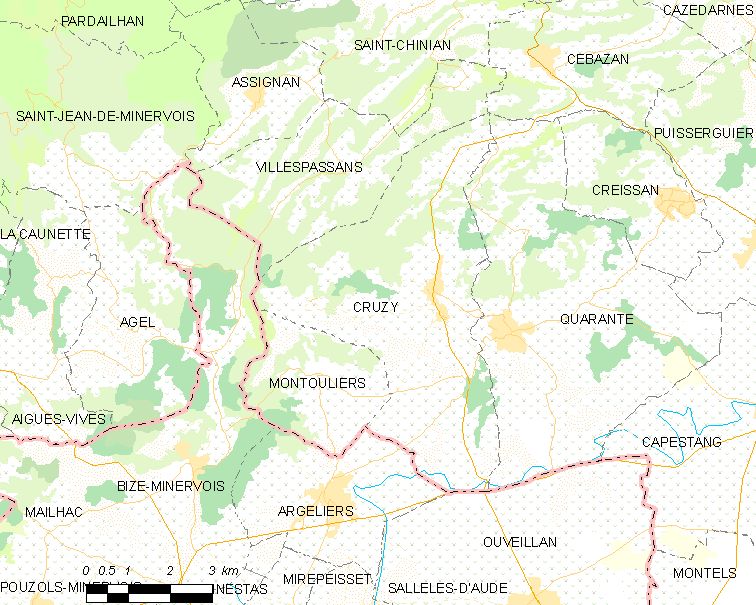
Map

== Population ==
Historical population
Year	Pop.	±% p.a.
1968	1,059	—
1975	905	−2.22%
1982	844	−0.99%
1990	801	−0.65%
1999	830	+0.40%
2007	948	+1.68%
2012	990	+0.87%
2017	988	−0.04%
2023	992	+0.07%
Source: INSEE

== See also ==
- Communes of the Hérault department
