= Mireille (opera) =

1864 opera in five acts by Charles Gounod

- Opera by Charles Gounod
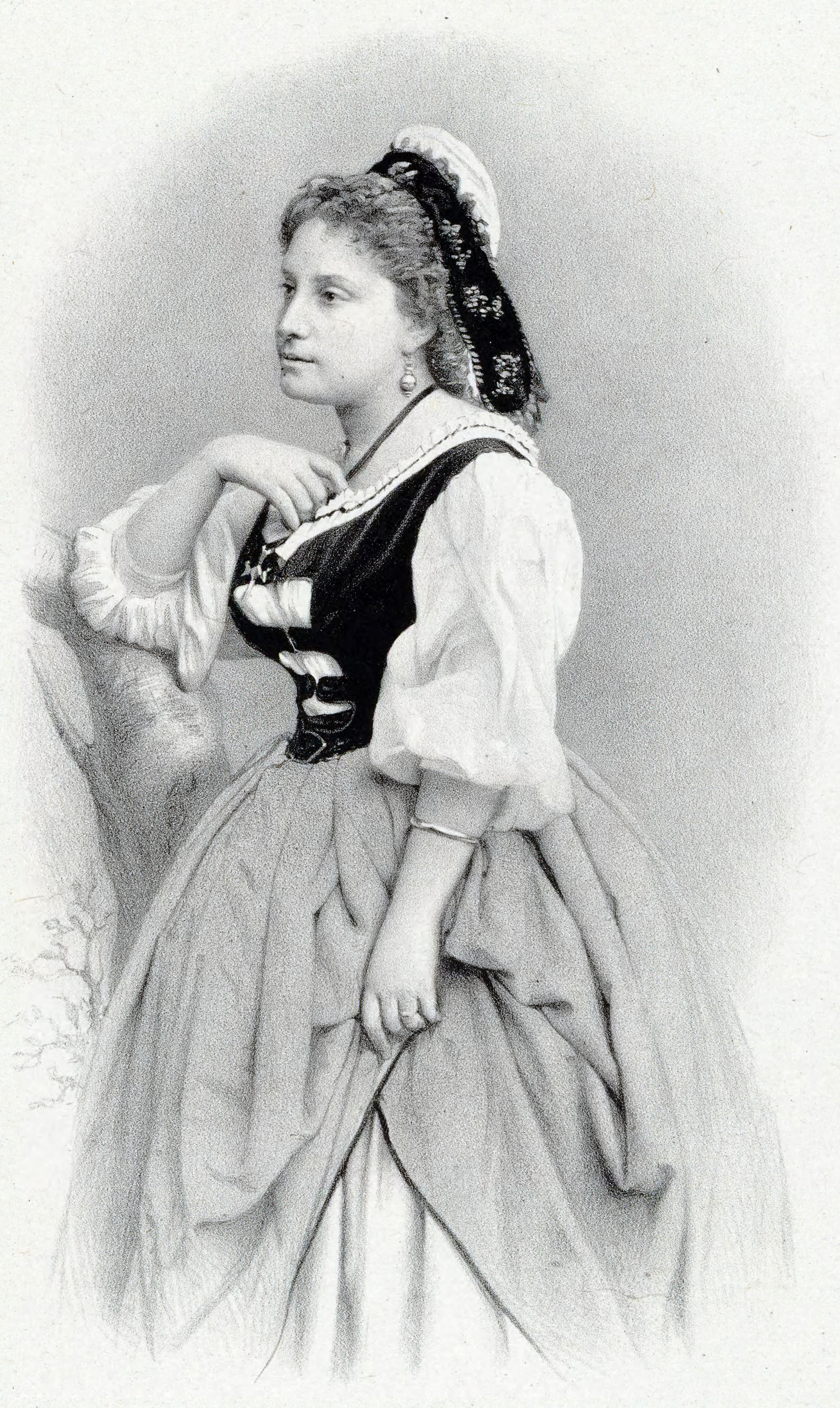
- Miolan-Carvalho in the title role in the premiere
- Librettist: Michel Carré
- Language: French
- Based on: Mireio by Frédéric Mistral
- Premiere: 19 March 1864; Théâtre Lyrique, Paris

Mireille is an 1864 opera in five acts by Charles Gounod to a French libretto by Michel Carré after Frédéric Mistral's poem Mirèio. The vocal score is dedicated to George V of Hanover.

== Composition history ==
Mistral had become well known in Paris with the publication of the French prose translation of Mireio in 1859, and Gounod probably knew the work by 1861. He was charmed by its originality, the story being much less contrived than many of those on the operatic stage at the time. The action of the opera is quite faithful to Mistral, although the sequence of events of the Val d’Enfer (Act 3, Scene 1) and Mireille's avowal of her love of Vincent to her father (Act 2 finale) are reversed in the opera. Gounod's biographer James Harding has argued that "what matters in this extended lyric poem is not the story but the rich tapestry of Provençal traditions, beliefs and customs that Mistral unfolds."

During the course of composition Gounod spent much time in Provence (12 March to the end of May 1863), visiting the sites of the action in the poem/opera, and met Mistral on several occasions at his home in Maillane. Gounod stayed at the Hôtel de la Ville Vert in Saint-Rémy-de-Provence, and was treated to a banquet by the townspeople on 26 May. Presenting class differences in a rural setting was not usual at the time, and as the musicologist Steven Huebner comments "some early reviewers had difficulty accepting that a 'mere' country girl could sing an aria with heroic cut such as 'En marche'."

== Performance history ==
A pre-performance run-through of the work at Gounod's house included Georges Bizet on the piano and Camille Saint-Saëns on the harmonium. Gounod and the Vicomtesse de Grandval (a composer herself) sang the solo parts.

=== Théâtre Lyrique ===
The opera premiered at the Théâtre Lyrique in Paris on 19 March 1864; the first night was attended by Ivan Turgenev, who in a letter to Pauline Viardot, ridicules part of Act 3.

As with the role of Marguerite in Faust, Gounod's demands on his principal soprano are particularly onerous – from light soprano in Act I to more dramatic singing in Act IV. Even before the premiere Gounod had been forced by his prima donna to make many changes to the form and content of his opera. This caused vocal problems for Miolan-Carvalho - wife of the theatre director - who got Gounod to make the role easier for her and particularly more 'brilliant'. Gounod even marked in the manuscript that the roulades at the end of her Act 2 air were demanded by her.

Critical reaction to the first performances was negative with accusations of Wagnerism. The criticisms led to a revised version first presented on 15 December 1864, in three acts with a happy ending. However, this version also failed to find an audience. The December performances of Mireille also included a revised ending to the overture (which has been used ever since, although the original slower coda is printed in the 1970 vocal score) and the 'valse-ariette' "O légère hirondelle" for Mireille in Act I.

=== Opéra-Comique ===
After Carvalho's company went bankrupt in 1868, the opera transferred to the Opéra-Comique, where it has had a long and varied career. The first production at the Salle Favart was on 10 November 1874, in four acts, but was poorly received. This production featured Miolan-Carvalho again in the title role, Galli-Marié as Taven and Andreloun, and Ismael appeared this time as Ramon, while Léon Melchissédec sang Ourrias; Deloffre conducted, as in the premiere run.

A revival on 29 November 1889, presented by the Opéra-Comique at the Théâtre Lyrique on the Place du Chatelet, with Cécile Simonnet as Mireille and Edmond Clément as Vincent, was in three acts with a happy ending in which Mireille and Vincent marry. This version did much better, and the opera became a repertory piece, receiving 226 performances by the end of 1894.

The three-act version pleased some later writers, who admired "warmth and colour" and found it "glows with the life and sunlight of the south".

A new production at the Opéra-Comique, which opened on 13 March 1901, was again in five acts (although acts 4 and 5 were both abridged), used spoken dialogue, and reinstated the tragic ending. The 500th performance at the Opéra-Comique took place on 19 December 1920.

On 6 June 1939 Reynaldo Hahn and Henri Büsser mounted a new production at the Opéra-Comique (revived in Arles on 28 June 1941), in which an attempt was made to revert to Gounod's original thoughts. Büsser edited the music and provided orchestrations for some passages for which Gounod's full scoring had been lost (most notably, much of the aria in the Crau scene, and Mireille's death in the finale). Subsequent productions have generally followed Büsser's edition. Whether it is a true reflection of the original score is doubtful: spoken dialogue was probably used at the première rather than recitatives, and the end of Act II was originally a repeat of the concertato, not a recollection of the Chanson de Magali. However, the work continued to be successful and by 1950 over 800 performances of Mireille had been given at the Opéra-Comique.

=== Other productions in France ===
Mireille was produced at the Gaîté-Lyrique on 11 May 1930.

A notable production was given on 24 July 1954 at the Baux de Provence with five thousand seats borrowed from the arenas in Nîmes and Arles, as part of the Aix-en-Provence Festival; the same cast and orchestra recorded the work under Cluytens a few days later in Aix.

Mireille was given its Paris Opera premiere in September 2009 in a production by the company's new director Nicolas Joël and was released on DVD.

=== Productions outside France ===
The opera was never as popular outside France. James Henry Mapleson produced the London premiere on 5 July 1864 at Her Majesty's Theatre (in Italian as Mirella). It was presented in five acts but with a new happy ending that Gounod later incorporated into the 3-act version at the Théâtre Lyrique in December. It was also likely the first version of the opera to include the recitatives (which Gounod originally intended for use in foreign productions). The cast included Thérèse Tietjens as Mireille (Mirella), Antonio Giuglini as Vincent (Vicenzo), Zelia Trebelli-Bettini as Taven (Tavena), Charles Santley as Ourrias (Urias), Mélanie-Charlotte Reboux as Vincennette (Vincenzina), Elisa Volpini as Andreloun (Andreluno), Marcel Junca as Ramon (Raimondo), and Édouard Gassier as Ambroise (Ambrogio), with Luigi Arditi as the conductor, but it was only a succès d'estime. On 29 April 1887 Mapleson revived the opera with Emma Nevada as Mireille at the Covent Garden theatre, where it was also given in Italian with the happy ending, but in the compressed 3-act form. On 10 June 1891 it was sung at the same theatre in French, and on 4 December 1899 at the Guildhall School of Music (in an English translation by Henry Fothergill Chorley). It was seen in Dublin on 29 September 1864 (in Italian).

Mireille was presented in French in Belgium: in Antwerp on 10 March 1865 and Brussels on 12 May, with further performances in later years. The Italian version was presented in St Petersburg on 9 February 1874, starring Adelina Patti in the title role and her future husband Nicolini as Vincent.

The opera was first seen in the United States at the Academy of Music in Philadelphia on 17 November 1864 (in German). It was first given in Chicago on 13 September 1880 (in English), and in New York on 18 December 1884 (in Italian). It was performed in the original French at the French Opera House in New Orleans on 29 January 1885. The Metropolitan Opera presented the opera on 28 February 1919, with Maria Barrientos as Mireille, Charles Hackett as Vincent, Kathleen Howard as Taven, and Clarence Whitehill as Ourrias and Pierre Monteux conducting. Despite the line-up, the production was only given four times, and the opera was never revived.

== Roles ==
Role	Voice type	Premiere Cast, 19 March 1864 (Conductor: Adolphe Deloffre)
Mireille	soprano	Marie Caroline Miolan-Carvalho
Vincent, her lover	tenor	François Morini
Ourrias, a bull-tender	baritone	Ismaël
Maître Ramon, father of Mireille	bass	Jules Petit
Taven, an old woman	mezzo-soprano	Constance-Caroline Faure-Lefèbvre
Vincenette, Vincent's sister	soprano	Mélanie-Charlotte Reboux
Andreloun, a shepherd	mezzo-soprano	Constance-Caroline Faure-Lefèbvre
Maître Ambroise, father of Vincent	bass	Émile Wartel
Clémence, a friend of Mireille	soprano	Mme Albrecht
A ferryman	baritone	Peyront
Mulberry gatherers, townspeople, friends of Ourrias, spirits of the Rhône, farmhands, pilgrims

== Synopsis ==
Place: Provence
Time: 19th Century

=== Act 1 ===
A mulberry grove on Midsummer night (Fête de la Saint-Jean).

Girls sing as they pick the leaves to feed to silkworms. Taven, an old woman who lives in nearby caves, joins them and comments on their jollity, but they laugh at "the witch" and Clemence voices her wish for a rich husband. Mireille however wants to marry for love, even if her husband be poor and shy, but is teased by the other girls who know that she has set her heart on a poor basket-weaver, Vincent. Taven shares her forebodings with Mireille. Vincent passes by and Mireille gets him to confess his love. As they part, they swear to meet in the church of Saintes-Maries-de-la-Mer if anything befalls one of them. The girls are heard singing the opening chorus in the distance.

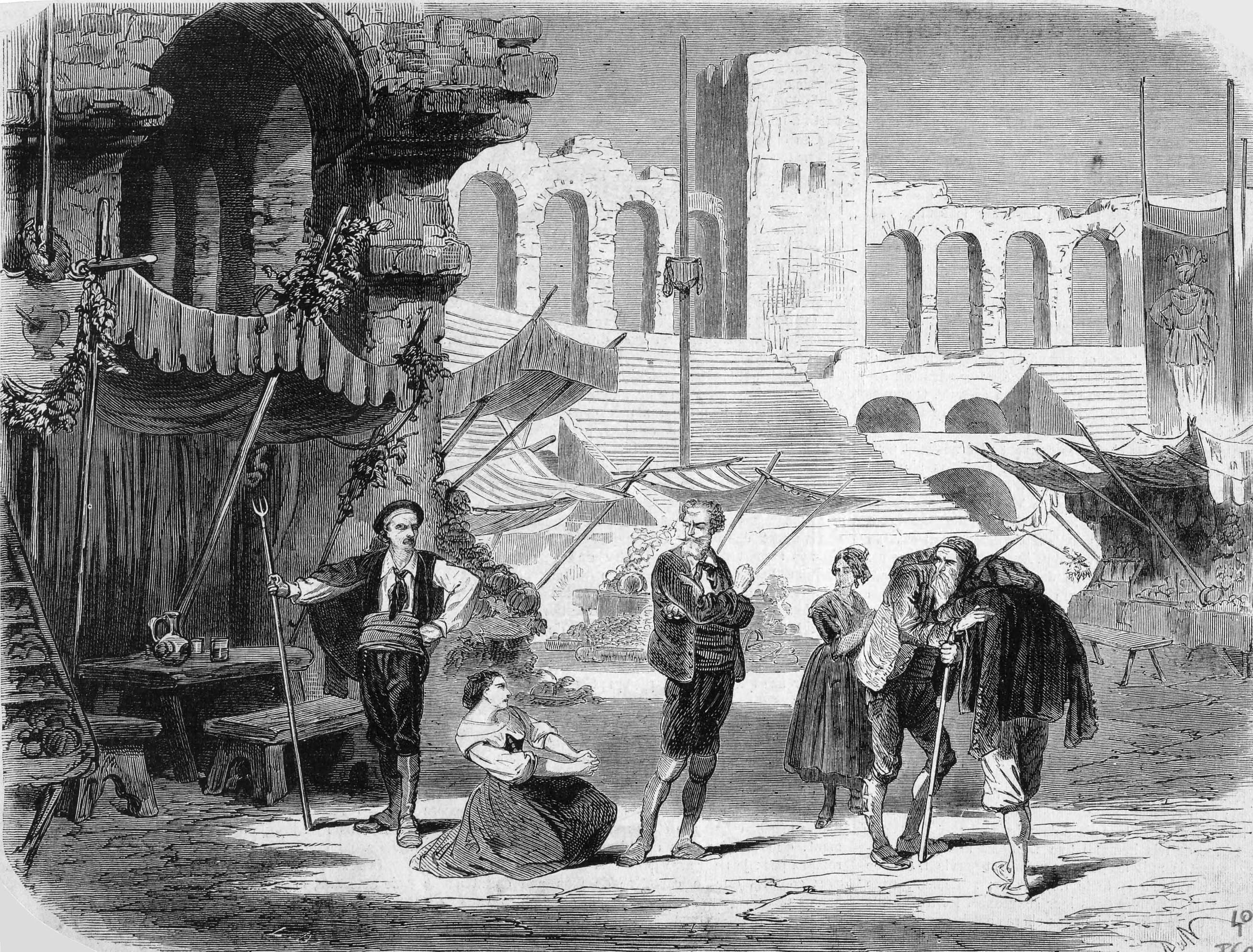
Act 2 finale in the original 1864 production

=== Act 2 ===
In front of the Arles Amphitheatre the same afternoon.

The crowd is singing and dancing a farandole as it waits for the start of a race. Mireille and Vincent arrive separately but they are greeted joyfully and sing the Song of Magali. After the race, Taven takes Mireille aside and tells her that she has just seen three young men, Ourrias, Alari and Pascoul arguing who should claim Mireille's hand. Alone, Mireille swears that nothing will part her from Vincent. Ourrias enters and forces his boastful attentions on her but Mireille politely rejects his advances. Mireille's father Ramon enters, followed shortly by Ambroise, the father of Vincent. Ambroise asks for advice on what to do about his son who is in love with a rich heiress; Ramon suggests beating the boy to cure him. Shocked, Ambroise is reminded by Ramon of a father's prerogative which used to extend even to life and death over his children. At this, Mireille comes forward crying "Kill me!" - she is the one Vincent loves. Ramon is outraged, orders Mireille to go home then turns on Vincent and Ambroise.

=== Act 3 ===
First Tableau: The Val d'Enfer in the country outside Arles. Night

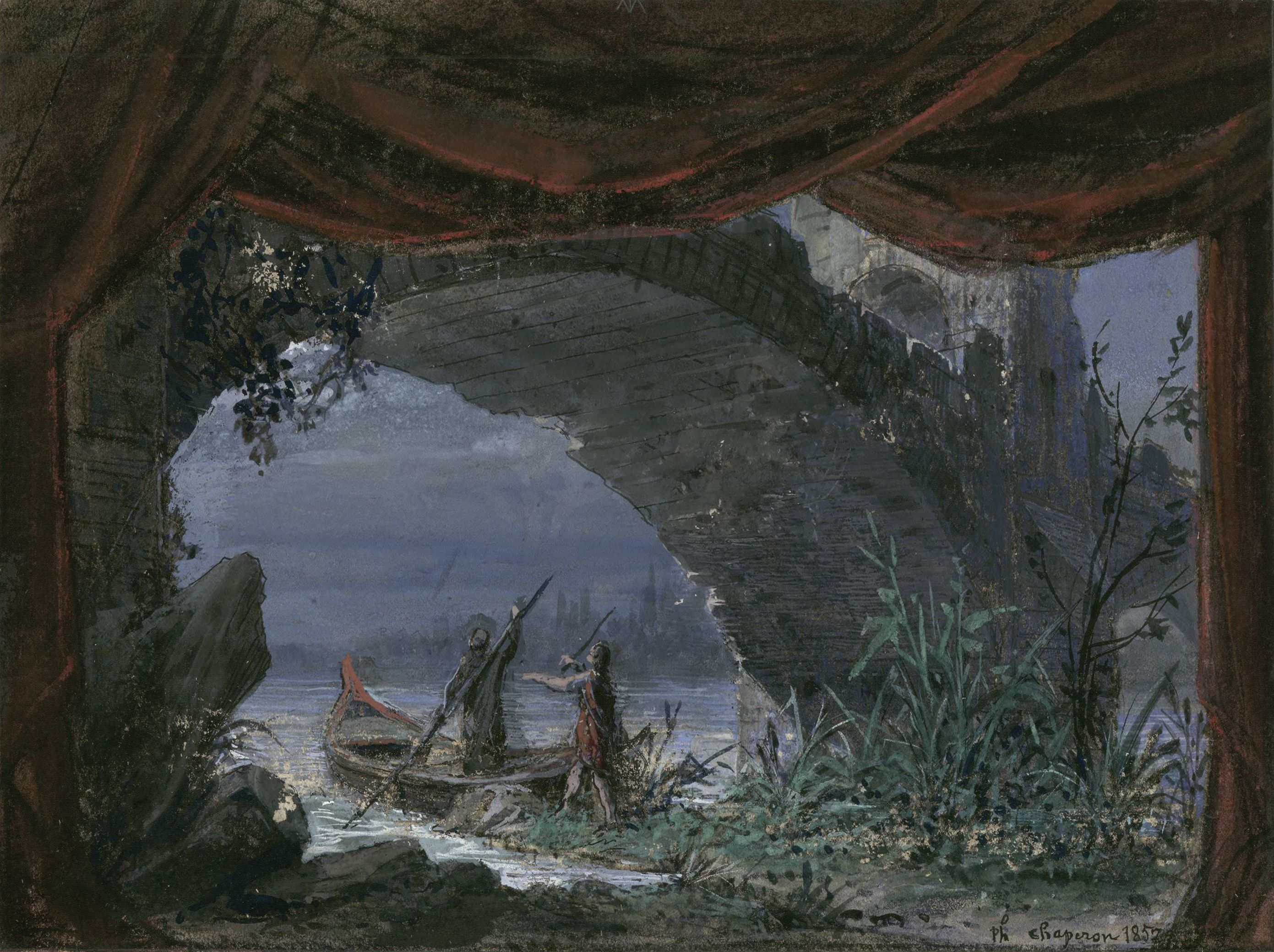
Act 3, second tableau (1864)

Ourrias and some friends are in the wild spot, supposedly peopled by spirits. Ourrias wants to buy a potion from Taven. Alone, Ourrias vents his fury and jealousy and lies in wait for Vincent, who soon appears. Ourrias insults him but although Vincent tries to calm him down, Ourrias strikes him with his trident, and thinking he has killed him, runs off. Taven hears cries and curses Ourrias as he rushes off, then tends to the unconscious Vincent.

Second Tableau: The banks of the Rhône

Full of remorse, Ourrias hurries to the river bank and calls the ferryman. An echo greets his call and moans sound with ghosts floating above the water. The ferryman (Passeur) arrives and Ourrias impatiently gets aboard. The waters swell, and, as the boatman reminds Ourrias of his crime, the boat sinks beneath the waves.

=== Act 4 ===
First Tableau: Ramon's farm late the same night

While the harvesters celebrate, Ramon is sad and knows that by denying Mireille's love he has destroyed his dream of a happy old age. From her window Mireille sees a young shepherd singing, and envies his carefree life. Unseen, Vincenette, Vincent's sister, comes to tell her that Vincent is wounded: Mireille resolves to set off at once to Saintes-Maries.

Second Tableau: The Crau desert

Mireille, staggers in already tired, and dazzled by the sun, faints as she hears shepherd's pipes in the distance. She makes a last effort to continue her journey.

=== Act 5 ===
In front of the chapel of Saintes-Maries-de-la-Mer. Midday

Pilgrims are singing. Vincent is there, looking for Mireille, and she arrives, exhausted and collapses in his arms. Ramon arrives with Vincenette, and forgives her, but Mireille dies and is called to heaven by a celestial voice.

== Musical form and style ==
The overture, the most extended to any stage work by Gounod, opens with a passage which later serves as the introduction to the tableau in the Crau, and with its horn calls and shimmering harmony is evocative of hot open spaces. There follows a theme associated with Vincent and a farandole-like allegretto.
According to Canteloube, the text of the Provençal folk-song 'Margarido, ma mio', found extensively in Provence, inspired Mistral's chanson Magali, while the music of the Chanson de Magali is based on the folksong 'Bouenjour, lou roussignou'. The alternating 9/8 and 6/8 time helps give the illusion of the fluidity of folk music.
The farandole which opens Act 2 is more in the character of a rigaudon or bourrée, and the grand finale to Act 2 is rather conventional operatic style.
By contrast, the supernatural scenes are not meant to frighten – they are more examples of Gounod the tone-painter. Act 3 allows Gounod to write "a Mendelssohnian scherzo with a dash of Berlioz and creates a frisson by means of chromatic harmony in the manner of Weber's Freischutz.
The Chanson d’Andreloun was originally written for a projected opera 'Ivan IV'. The musette in Act IV Sc 1 has the oboe and clarinet imitating a bagpipe, while in the final act the off-stage hymn Le voile enfin is an adaptation of the Latin sequence ‘Lauda Sion Salvatorem’.
Overall the score "reminds us of the abundance and variety of Gounod's gifts and of his unfailing imaginative grasp of the lyric stage."

== Recordings ==
Audio

- 1954 - Janette Vivalda (Mireille), Nicolai Gedda (Vincent), Michel Dens (Ourrias), Christine Gayraud (Taven), André Vessières (Ramon) - Aix-en-Provence Festival Chorus, Paris Conservatoire Orchestra, André Cluytens (Voix de son Maitre). This studio recording was made in Aix some days after a live performance, which had been recorded for radio broadcast on 15 August. This radio recording was issued by INA mémoire vive in 2008.
- 1962– Renée Doria (Mireille), Michel Sénéchal (Vincent), Robert Massard (Ourrias), Solange Michel (Taven), Adrien Legros (Ramon) - Orchestre symphonique et Choeur de Paris, Jésus Etcheverry - (Accord)
- 1979– Mirella Freni (Mireille), Alain Vanzo (Vincent), José van Dam (Ourrias), Jane Rhodes (Taven), Gabriel Bacquier (Ramon) - Chœur et Orchestre du Capitole de Toulouse - Michel Plasson - (EMI)
- 1981 (Live) - Valerie Masterson (Mireille), Luis Lima (Vincent), Jean-Philippe Lafont (Ourrias), Jane Berbié (Taven), Jules Bastin (Ramon) - Suisse Romande Chorus and Orchestra - Sylvain Cambreling (Ponto)
- 1993 (Live) – Danielle Borst (Mireille), Christian Papis (Vincent), Marcel Vanaud (Ourrias), Bernadette Antoine (Taven), Jean-Philippe Courtis (Ramon) – Orchestre de Recontres Musicales of Lausanne; Municipal Theatre Opera Chorus, Lausanne; Epallinges Children's Chorus – Cyril Diederich (Cascavelle), recorded live in November.

Video

- 2009 – Inva Mula (Mireille), Charles Castronovo (Vincent), Franck Ferrari (Ourrias), Alain Vernhes (Ramon), Sylvie Brunet (Taven), Anne-Catherine Gillet (Vincenette), Sébastien Droy (Andreloun); Orchestra and Chorus of the Opéra national de Paris, Marc Minkowski (conductor); Nicolas Joël (production), Ezio Frigerio (sets), Franca Squarciapino (costumes), Vinicio Cheli (lighting). Label: FRA Musica, cat. no. 502 (2 DVDs: 152:00), recorded live in September at the Palais Garnier in Paris. OCLC 762922255.
