= San Antonio Opera =

The San Antonio Opera was an American opera company located in San Antonio, Texas that produced 16 seasons of opera before filing for bankruptcy and dissolving in 2012. The company was founded as the Pocket Opera of San Antonio in 1997 by Mark Richter, and opened its first season in the fall of 1997 with Wolfgang Amadeus Mozart's Der Schauspieldirektor at the San Pedro Playhouse. Initially the company's productions utilized local artists, but by the 1999-2000 season the company had begun employing internationally recognized artists. It simultaneously rebranded itself as the Lyric Opera of San Antonio and began performing at the Lila Cockrell Theatre. The opera company changed its name to the San Antonio Opera a few years later. Notable artists to have performed with the company include Plácido Domingo, José Carreras, and Andrea Bocelli among others.
