= Roger Soyer =

French opera singer

Roger Soyer (born 1 September 1939) is a French operatic bass-baritone, particularly associated with the French repertory and with Mozart.

Soyer was born in Thiais, and first studied privately with G. Daum, before entering the Conservatoire de Paris at the age of 19. There he was a pupil of Georges Jouatte and Louis Musy. He made his professional debut at the Théâtre des Champs-Élysées in 1962, creating the role of Mac Creag in Gilbert Bécaud's opera L'opéra d'Aran.

He sang on French Radio in 1964, in Rameau's Hippolyte et Aricie, and made his debut at the Aix-en-Provence Festival in 1965, as Pluton in Monteverdi's L'Orfeo. The same year he made his debut at the Opéra-Comique, as Colline, in La Bohème, and at the Palais Garnier, as Mephisto in Gounod's Faust.

On the international scene, he appeared at the Wexford Festival in La jolie fille de Perth, and at the Edinburgh Festival as Don Giovanni, a role he became closely associated with, singing it at Aix-en-Provence, Munich, Vienna, Florence, Chicago, New York.

Other notable roles include; Ferrando in Il trovatore, Procida in Les vêpres siciliennes, Titurel in Parsifal, Rangoni in Boris Godunov, Pope Clement in Benvenuto Cellini, Achis in David et Jonathas, Narbal in Les Troyens, etc.

Soyer has a beautiful and smoothly produced voice. His numerous recordings (operatic and otherwise) include performances of the following four French operas: Lakmé, opposite Mady Mesplé and Charles Burles, under Alain Lombard; Werther, opposite Victoria de los Angeles and Nicolai Gedda, under Georges Prêtre; Benvenuto Cellini, opposite Gedda and Robert Massard, under Sir Colin Davis; and Les Troyens, opposite Jon Vickers and Josephine Veasey, also under Sir Colin Davis.

== Sources ==
- Guide de l’opéra, Mancini & Rouveroux, (Fayard, 1995). ISBN 2-213-59567-4
