= Manuel Rosenthal =

French composer and conductor (1904–2003)

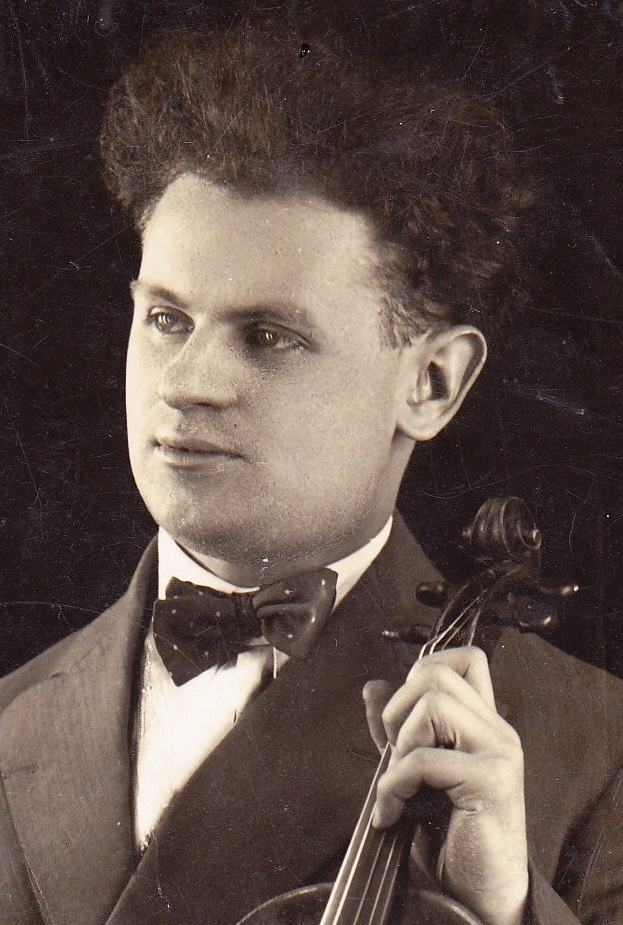
Rosenthal in 1920

Manuel Rosenthal (18 June 1904 – 5 June 2003) was a French composer and conductor who held leading positions with musical organizations in France and the United States. He was friends with many contemporary composers, and despite a considerable list of compositions is mostly remembered for having orchestrated the popular ballet score Gaîté Parisienne from piano scores of Offenbach operettas, and for his recordings as a conductor.

== Early life and career ==
Rosenthal was born in Paris to Anna Devorsosky, of Russian-Jewish descent, and a French father he never met. His surname was taken from his stepfather, Bernard Rosenthal.

He started his musical studies on violin at age 6, which he played in cafés and cinemas after his stepfather's death in 1918 to support his mother and sisters. In 1920, he entered the Conservatoire in Paris but eventually left it after failing to win an expected first prize. In addition to continuing his violin studies with Alterman and Jules Boucherit and playing in theatre and cinema bands, he also studied composition. Around this time he met Léo Sir, inventor of string instruments known as the dixtuor, and was persuaded to play the sursoprano (a 4th higher than the violin) and find composers to write for this new medium. Through this Rosenthal met eminent young Parisian composers of whom Darius Milhaud and Arthur Honegger were the most distinguished, and also contributed his own music to a recital in Paris in October 1921.

His Sonatine for two violins and piano, composed for a sight-reading examination, was acclaimed after its performance at the 99th concert of the Société musicale indépendante in Paris at the end of October 1924, attended by both Nadia Boulanger and Alexis Roland-Manuel. After a stint in the military he became a student of Maurice Ravel, seeing him once or twice a month while also having lessons in counterpoint and fugue from Jean Huré. while continuing to play violin in the Moulin Rouge and Casino de Paris café orchestras. Ravel's encouragement ultimately led to his winning the Prix Blumenthal (worth 20,000 francs) in 1928. Ravel lobbied the directors of the Opéra-Comique to get Rosenthal's one-act opera Rayon des soieries performed there in June 1930. He also arranged for Rosenthal's conducting debut, at a concert composed of Rosenthal's own music in 1928.

== Conducting career ==
His conducting career began in earnest in 1934, when he became percussionist and assistant conductor of the Orchestre National de France, to Désiré-Émile Inghelbrecht. In 1936, Georges Mandel invited him to conduct the Orchestre de Radio PTT. As his fame as a conductor grew, he was attacked in Action Française in 1937 by Lucien Rebatet, who demanded his expulsion from his radio conductorship. In the same year Serge Koussevitzky, in Paris during the Exposition, invited Rosenthal to become assistant conductor of the Boston Symphony under him – an offer reiterated after a Salle Pleyel concert on the eve of war in 1939. After Ravel's death in 1937, and following the success of Gaîté Parisienne, he became a close colleague of Igor Stravinsky.

Rosenthal's musical career was interrupted by World War II when, as a corporal in the 300th infantry regiment stationed in 1939 in Alsace near the Rhine, he was taken prisoner by the Germans in May 1940. Still musically active even as a POW, he not only organized concerts in the camp he was interned in but even composed an operetta based on a play by Georges Courteline. Included in a POW exchange, he was sent back to the occupied zone, arrived back in Paris in March 1941 and escaped to Marseille in the Zone libre (free zone) with the help of Roland-Manuel. But he was arrested in Besançon in September 1941 while trying to see his son and sentenced to six months forced labor. With the assistance of a German officer, however, he got the necessary papers to escape back to Marseille. Later in 1942, he returned to Paris and courageously joined the Resistance, working with eminent musical colleagues Désormière, Durey, Delvincourt, Charles Munch and others.

Upon the liberation in 1944, he returned to the Orchestre National de France to become their principal conductor, a post he held until 1947. The first concert consisted of works from each of the Allied countries, including the Hymne à la Justice by Magnard. He made sure a wide range of contemporary music was played, and the first season included a complete Stravinsky cycle. In his final year with the orchestra, he brought it to England to join Sir Thomas Beecham and the Royal Philharmonic in a concert organized by Jack Hylton that filled the Harringay Arena with 13,500 listeners.

In early 1946, Rosenthal's first conductorship in the USA was with the St. Louis Symphony Orchestra. Having accepted the post of composer-in-residence at the College of Puget Sound, he was invited to become music director of the Seattle Symphony, which he conducted from 1948–1951 while undertaking guest engagements in San Francisco and Buenos Aires. He then went to Algiers to conduct there and in Tunis during the winter of 1952-53.

He was music director of the Orchestre Symphonique de Liège from 1964-1967, and professor of conducting at the Paris Conservatoire from 1962 to 1974, where he established a more demanding schedule for his students, who included Yan Pascal Tortelier, Eliahu Inbal, Jacques Mercier, Marc Soustrot and Jean-Claude Casadesus. He conducted some of the first modern performances of Jean-Philippe Rameau's Zoroastre, at the Grand Théâtre de Bordeaux and the Opéra-Comique in 1964. The BBC in Manchester invited him to conduct an opera of his choice in 1973, which turned out to be Emmanuel Chabrier's Le roi malgré lui, for which he chose a French cast.

In February 1981, Rosenthal made his debut at the Metropolitan Opera New York in a mixed-bill of 20th century French stage works, returning in 1983 for Francis Poulenc's 1957 operatic masterpiece Dialogues des carmélites and for further appearances in 1986-87. He returned to Seattle in 1986 to conduct Richard Wagner's Ring cycle at the Seattle Opera.

He conducted the first performance of Claude Debussy's radical 1902 operatic masterpiece Pelléas et Mélisande in Russia, in Moscow in 1988, and later that year premiered the same work in Caracas, Venezuela. In 1992, he conducted a production of Padmâvatî by Albert Roussel at the Opera Bastille.

== Composer ==
Rosenthal composed prolifically in many classical genres, including operas, operettas, ballets, 13 works for orchestra, choral works both with orchestra and a cappella, works for solo voice and orchestra, chamber music, and music for voice and piano as well as for solo piano. The wide variety of his work, in terms of both genre and tone, reflects his refusal to accept the stylistic compartmentalization prevalent in Paris in the 1920s.

His reputation as a composer was sealed in France with Jeanne d'Arc, first performed in 1936, although this was followed by a production of the light-hearted one-act operetta La Poule Noire of 1937.

His best-known compositional work was not his own, the 1938 ballet Gaîté Parisienne orchestrated from operetta selections by Jacques Offenbach (copied manually by assistants who chose them from piano scores they speed-read in the Harvard University music library, the most complete repository of Offenbach scores known at that time). The commission by Léonide Massine was originally entrusted to Roger Désormière, but for lack of time Désormière asked his friend Rosenthal to take over the project. Rosenthal was initially reluctant, but fulfilled the commission. Massine rejected the score but, after arbitration by Igor Stravinsky, finally accepted the work and choreographed the ballet, which turned out to be a major success. He also orchestrated works by Federico Mompou and Ravel.

He was a fluent composer of choral and sacred works, such as La Pietà d'Avignon (1943), Trois pièces liturgiques (1944) and Missa Deo gratias (1953). Parts of his Saint François d'Assise may have influenced Olivier Messiaen, who wrote an extensive opera on the same subject.

In 1965 his serious opera Hop, Signor! was a disappointment in Toulouse and at the Opéra-Comique.

== Works ==
=== Stage works ===
- Rayon des soieries, 1923-1926, opéra bouffe in one act
- Un baiser pour rien ou La folle du logis, 1928-1929, ballet in one act
- Les Bootleggers, 1932, comédie musicale in one act
- La Poule noire, 1933-1937, comédie musicale in one act
- Gaîté Parisienne, 1938, ballet in one act d’après Offenbach
- Que le diable l'emporte, 1948, ballet in one act
- Les femmes au tombeau, 1956, drame lyrique in one act
- Hop, Signor! 1957-1961, drame lyrique in three acts

=== Orchestral ===
- Sérénade, 1927
- Jeanne d'Arc, 1934–36
- Les petits métiers, 1933 (Le Maréchal ferrant, L’Herboriste, Le Montreur de Marionnettes, Le Veilleur de Nuit, Le Facteur Déodat, Le Barbier, La Marchande d’Oublies, Le Rémouleur, La Nounou, Le petit Télégraphiste)
- Musique de table, 1941 (Entrée de Convives, Salade russe, Matelote d’Anguilles, Quenelles lyonnaises, Filet de Bœuf, Jardinière de Légumes, Cuissot de Chevreuil, Salade de Saison, Fromage de Montagne, Bombe glacée, Corbeille de fruits, Café, Liqueurs, Cigares, Conversations d’après diner)
- Noce Villageoise, 1941
- Symphonies de Noël, 1947
- Magic Manhattan, 1948
- Symphony in C, 1949
- Offenbachiana, 1953
- Rondes Françaises, 1955

=== Vocal, choral ===
- Saint François d'Assise, 1936–39
- Trois burlesques, 1941
- La pietà d’Avignon, 1943
- Cantate pour le temps de la Nativité, 1943–44
- Deux sonnets de Jean Cassou, 1944
- A choeur vaillant, 1952–53
- Missa Deo Gratias, 1953
- Trois pièces liturgiques, 1958

=== Instrumental ===
- Sonatine for two violins and piano, 1922
- Saxophone-Marmelade, 1929
- Les Soirées du Petit Juas, string quartet, 1942
- Aesopi Convivium (violin, piano, orchestra), 1947-1948

== Selected recordings ==
- Debussy: Orchestral works - Prélude à l'après-midi d'un faune, Images pour orchestre, Jeux, Nocturnes, La Mer; Orchestra of the Opéra de Paris, conducted by Manuel Rosenthal. VEGA
- Ravel: Daphnis et Chloé, Rapsodie espagnole, Alborada del gracioso, Valses nobles et sentimentales; Orchestra of the Opéra de Paris, conducted by Manuel Rosenthal. VEGA
- Ravel: L'heure espagnole - Géori Boué (Concepcion), Roger Bourdin (Ramiro), Orchestre National de France, conductor: Manuel Rosenthal. Paris 28 December 1944. IMV 027.
- Ibert: Concertino da camera for alto saxophone and eleven instruments, Debussy: Rapsodie, Loeffler: Poeme paien d'apres Virgile - Marcel Mule, Orchestre Philharmonique de Paris, conductor Manuel Rosenthal. Paris, 1952, 2-EMI 85240.
- Glazounov: Suite from Raymonda - Orchestre Philharmonique de Paris, conductor Manuel Rosenthal. Paris, 1952, 2-EMI 85240.
- Scriabin: The Poem of Ecstasy - Orchestre Philharmonique de Paris, conductor Manuel Rosenthal. Paris, 1952, 2-EMI 85240.
- Sauguet: Les caprices de Marianne - Andrée Esposito (Marianne), Michel Sénéchal (Coelio), Camille Maurane (Octave), Orchestre Radio-Lyrique, conductor: Manuel Rosenthal. Paris, 27–28 May 1959. SOCD 98/99
- Bizet: Les pêcheurs de perles - Jeanine Micheau (Leila), Alain Vanzo (Nadir), Gabriel Bacquier (Zurga), Lucien Lovano (Nourabad), Chœur de la RTF, Orchestre Radio-Lyrique, conductor: Manuel Rosenthal. Paris, 25 June 1959. GALA GL 100.504
- Messiaen: Chronochromie - Orchestre National de France, conductor Manuel Rosenthal. Ades 14122.
- Lalo: Symphonie espagnole, Camille Saint-Saëns, violin concerto n°3. Arthur Grumiaux (violin), Orchestre des Concerts Lamoureux, conductor: Manuel Rosenthal. Eloquence 462 579-2 (1963).
- Satie: Parade, Trois Petite Pieces Montées, Socrate, En habit de cheval. French National Radio & Television Orchestra, Manuel Rosenthal. 1968. Everest - EVERCD014
- Offenbach: Pomme d'api, M. Choufleuri restera chez lui le . . ., Mesdames de la Halle - Mady Mesplé, Jean-Philippe Lafont, Léonard Pezzino, Charles Burles, Michel Trempont, Michel Hamel; Orchestre Philharmonique de Monte-Carlo, Ensemble Choral Jean Laforge, Conductor: Manuel Rosenthal. Monte Carlo 21–29 September 1982. EMI 3952972.
- Puccini: Tosca - Jane Rhodes, Albert Lance, Gabriel Bacquier; Orchestra of the Opéra de Paris, conducted by Manuel Rosenthal. VEGA - VAL 18
- Offenbach: La belle Hélène - Jane Rhodes, Bernard Plantey, Jean Giraudeau, Michel Hamel, Jacques Doucet, Bernard Demigny, Andrine Forli; Orchestra and Chorus of the Opéra-Comique, Paris, conducted by Manuel Rosenthal. Philips GL5664

== Personal life ==
Rosenthal was married twice. His first marriage was to a chorus girl, Mlle. Troussier, in 1927. He had begun a relationship with soprano Claudine Verneuil while still married to his first wife, but during his tenure in Seattle presented Claudine as his wife even though he had not divorced Troussier. His failure to declare Verneuil's true status led to his detention for six weeks on Ellis Island on the way back to Seattle in October 1951, and his Seattle contract was terminated after the discovery of his first marriage. In 1952, he finally obtained a divorce and married Verneuil. He had two sons, Alain born in 1933 and Clément in 1956.

He was made a Chevalier of the Légion d'honneur in 1961 and a Commandeur in 1991.

A convert to Roman Catholicism, in 1999 he published a small book, 'Crescendo vers Dieu', in which he examined the religious beliefs that were woven into his life story.

He died in Paris, just short of his 99th birthday.
