= Mimi Aarden =

Dutch opera singer

Mimi Aarden (3 May 1924 – 3 May 2013) was a Dutch operatic mezzo-soprano who had an international performance career from 1948 until her retirement in 1971.

== Biography ==
=== Early life and career ===
Mimi Aarden was born on 3 May 1924 in Steenbergen, Holland. She was trained as a singer at the Conservatorium van Amsterdam where she was a pupil of Ruth Horna and Daniella Lohoff. She made her professional opera debut at the Vlaamse Opera (VO) in Antwerp in the title role of Georges Bizet's Carmen in 1948. (Note: The Grosses Sängerlexikon stated her debut was as Carmen in 1949 in Amsterdam; a fact which has been repeated elsewhere online. However, this appears to be an error, as the Amsterdam company itself published an obituary stating that her role debut with it wasn't until years later in 1953, and that she first performed at the Antwerp Opera for her professional debut as Carmen in 1948.) She would return often to the VO throughout her career as a guest artist. Her first performance in Holland was at the Stadsschouwburg Utrecht as the Third Lady in Mozaart's The Magic Flute on March 19, 1953, and she made her debut at the De Nederlandse Opera in Amsterdam as Carmen on March 25, 1954. She was a later a principle singer with that same company in 1956–1957 and again in 1965–1966.

=== International performance career ===
After working in Holland, Aarden worked as an opera singer in Germany at the Deutsche Oper Berlin (1955–1956), the Cologne Opera (1958–1959), and the Hamburg State Opera (HSO, 1960–1964). At the HSO she portrayed the Electress in the world premiere of Hans Werner Henze's Der Prinz von Homburg on 22 May 1960. In 1957 she portrayed Baba the Turn in Stravinsky's The Rake's Progress at the Holland Festival (HF), and that same year she performed the title role in Jules Massenet's Hérodiade for a radio broadcast which was later released on CD by the Malibran record label. In 1958 she performed the role of Amneris in Aida for her debut at the Royal Opera House in London.

Aarden performed often as a guest at the Royal Opera of Ghent during her career. In 1958–1959 she performed the role of Marcellina in Mozart's The Marriage of Figaro at the HF under Carlo Maria Giulini; a live recording of which was released on the Verona label. She was committed to the Opéra Royal de Wallonie in 1962–1963 where one of her roles was Azucena in Verdi's Il trovatore. In 1964 she sang in a radio broadcast of François-Adrien Boieldieu's La dame blanche which was later released on CD by Golden Melodram. She returned to the HF to create the role of De Profetes in the world premiere of Ton de Leeuw's De Droom on June 16, 1965. Later that year she appeared in the Concertgebouw, Amsterdam concert series VARA-Matinee as La Principessa di Bouillon in Adriana Lecouvreur with Magda Olivero in the title role; a performance which was recorded and released by Opera Fanatic on CD.

In 1966 she was a principle soprano at La Monnaie in Brussels. Her final stage performance was as the gypsy Czipra in Johann Strauss II's The Gypsy Baron with the Dutch National Opera in 1971. Other parts she portrayed during her career included Annina in Strauss's Der Rosenkavalier, the Countess in Tchaikovsky's The Queen of Spades, Emelia in Otello, Preziosilla in La forza del destino, Princess Eboli in Verdi's Don Carlos, Maddalena in Rigoletto, Ulrica in Verdi's Un ballo in maschera, and the title role in Britten's The Rape of Lucretia.

=== Death ===
Aarden died on her 89th birthday on 3 May 2013 in Breda, Netherland.

== Notes and references ==
=== Bibliography ===
- Kutsch, K. J.; Riemens, Leo (2003). "Aarden, Mimi". In Rost, Hansjörg (ed.). Grosses Sängerlexikon. K. G. Saur Verlag. ISBN 978-3-598-44088-5.
