= Robert Massard =

French opera singer (1925–2025)

Robert Massard (15 August 1925 – 26 December 2025) was a French baritone, primarily associated with the French repertory.

== Life and career ==
Massard was born in Pau, France, and was mainly self-taught. After singing in his native province, Massard made his professional debut at the Paris Opera in 1952, as the High Priest in Samson et Dalila, shortly followed by Valentin in Faust. The same year, he also made his debut at the Aix-en-Provence Festival, as Thoas in Iphigénie en Tauride. His career rapidly took an international dimension with debuts in 1955, at La Scala and the Glyndebourne Festival, both as Ramiro in L'heure espagnole. Oreste in Iphigénie en Tauride was his debut role at the Maggio Musicale Fiorentino, the Royal Opera House in London, and the Edinburgh Festival.

Massard also appeared in North and South America, notably at the Lyric Opera of Chicago, at Carnegie Hall in New York, the Teatro Colón in Buenos Aires. Henceforth considered one of the best French baritones of his generation, he was internationally acclaimed as Valentin in Faust, Escamillo in Carmen, Chorèbe in Les Troyens, Fieramosca in Benvenuto Cellini, and Golaud in Pelléas et Mélisande. He also enjoyed considerable success in the Italian repertory, singing Enrico in Lucia di Lammermoor, notably at the Paris Opera in 1960, opposite Joan Sutherland, and Riccardo in I puritani in London in 1961, again with Sutherland. He also appeared as Rigoletto and Germont in La traviata. Massard also sang in contemporary works, such as Le Roi David and L'école des maris by Emmanuel Bondeville, and Médée by Darius Milhaud.

Massard made many recordings, the two most famous being Faust, opposite Joan Sutherland, Franco Corelli, Nicolai Ghiaurov, and Carmen, opposite Maria Callas, Nicolai Gedda and Andréa Guiot, with Georges Prêtre conducting.

Massard turned 100 on 15 August 2025, and died on 26 December 2025.
