= Michel Sénéchal =

French opera singer

Michel Sénéchal (11 February 1927 – 1 April 2018) was a French tenor, particularly associated with French and Italian character roles in a repertory ranging from Baroque to contemporary works.

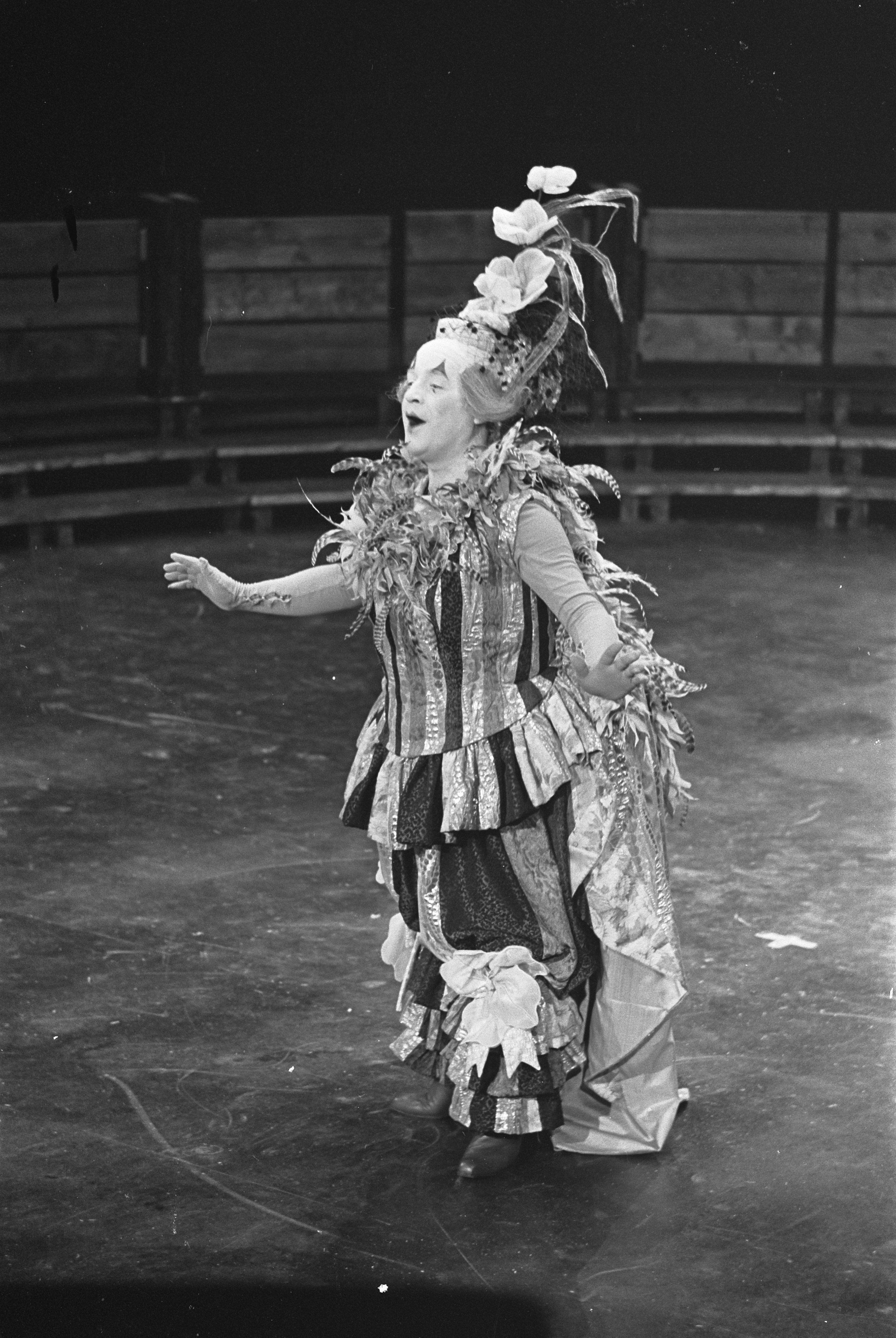
Michel Senechal in the title role of Platée by Jean-Philippe Rameau, staged in Carré (Amsterdam, 1968)

== Life and career ==
Michel Sénéchal was born in Paris and sang as a child in a church choir in Taverny. He made his vocal studies at the Paris Conservatory, and made his debut at La Monnaie in Brussels in 1950, where he would remain until 1952. Upon his return in France he made his debut in Paris, at the Paris Opéra and the Opéra-Comique, where he sang the lead tenor roles in opera such as La dame blanche, Les Indes galantes, Il matrimonio segreto, The Barber of Seville, Le comte Ory, etc. He sang at the Aix-en-Provence Festival for 23 years, notably in Rameau's Platée for his debut there in 1956. He also appeared at the Vienna State Opera, the festivals of Salzburg and Glyndebourne, in Mozart roles such as Ottavio and Tamino.

Sénéchal also appeared regularly in operetta, especially by Offenbach, such as Orphée aux enfers, La Vie parisienne and La Périchole, where his comic talent was shown to fine effect. As the years went by Sénéchal started concentrating on character roles such as Basilio in Nozze di Figaro, Goro in Madama Butterfly, the Holy Fool in Boris Godunov, Monsieur Triquet in Eugene Onegin, Guillot de Morfontaine in Manon, and the four servants in Les contes d'Hoffmann, which were his debut roles at the Metropolitan Opera on 8 March 1982. Sénéchal took part in the creation of contemporary works such as the roles of Fabien in Marcel Landowski's Montségur and Pope Leo X in Konrad Boehmer's Doctor Faustus. He remained active on stage until late in life, appearing in performance into the early years of the 21st century.

He began teaching at "L'École d'art lyrique" of the Paris Opéra in 1979, and was eventually named director of the school. He can be heard in several recordings, such as La dame blanche, the title role in Le Comte Ory, Mireille, and Thais, made in his prime, in the early 1960s.

Michel Sénéchal died in Eaubonne on 1 April 2018, aged 91.

== Sources ==
- Alain Pâris, Dictionnaire des interprètes et de l'interpretation musicale au XX siècle (2 vols), Éditions Robert Laffont (Bouquins, Paris 1982, 4th Edn. 1995, 5th Edn 2004). ISBN 2-221-06660-X
- Roland Mancini and Jean-Jacques Rouveroux, (orig. H. Rosenthal and J. Warrack, French edition), Guide de l’opéra, Les indispensables de la musique (Fayard, 1995). ISBN 2-213-01563-5
