= Renée Doria =

French singer (1921–2021)

Renée Doria (13 February 1921 – 6 March 2021) was a French opera singer, one of the leading lyric coloratura sopranos of her era in France.

== Biography ==
Born Renée Dumazert in Perpignan, France, after a thorough musical training (piano, solfege, harmony) she turned to vocal study with Umberto Valdarmini, and made her singing debut in concert at the age of 18. Her official operatic debut took place in 1942, at the Opéra de Marseille, as Rosina in Il barbiere di Siviglia.

After singing Constance in Die Entführung aus dem Serail in Cannes under Reynaldo Hahn, and the three heroines (Olympia, Giulietta, Antonia) in Les contes d'Hoffmann in Strasbourg, opposite the great French bass-baritone Vanni Marcoux, she made her Paris debut at the Gaîté-Lyrique in 1943, as Lakmé, and the following year, made her debut at the Opéra-Comique, in the same role. Her debut at the Paris Opera in 1947, as the Queen of the Night in The Magic Flute, was highly successful. Other roles at that house included: Leila in Les pêcheurs de perles, the title role in Mireille, Marguerite in Faust, Juliette in Roméo et Juliette, Ophélie in Hamlet, Manon, Thaïs, as well as Fiordiligi in Così fan tutte, Gilda in Rigoletto, and Violetta in La traviata, etc. She appeared in the premiere of Rocio by Maurice Perez with Ninon Vallin in Mulhouse in 1949.

Doria also sang in baroque music such as Rameau's Les Indes galantes, and contemporary works, such as Ravel's L'heure espagnole, and Poulenc's Dialogues des Carmélites. In thirty years of career, Doria sang an estimated sixty roles. She retired from the stage after appearances as Susanna in Limoges in 1968.

Renée Doria made several recordings, most notably, complete studio recordings of Contes d'Hoffmann (1948), Thaïs (1961), Mireille (1962), Massenet's Sapho (1978), and excerpts from Rigoletto, Faust, and Manon, opposite Alain Vanzo, as well as recitals of arias and songs. Doria was noted for "highly expressive verbal shading... exquisite command of soft dynamics" and a "vibrant top extension".

She resided in La Celle-sur-Morin. Doria died in March 2021, less than a month after her 100th birthday.

== Sources ==
- Alain Pâris, Dictionnaire des interprètes et de l'interprétation musicale au XX siècle (2 vols), Ed. Robert Laffont (Bouquins, Paris 1982, 4th ed. 1995, 5th Edn 2004). ISBN 2-221-06660-X
- Rochet, Jean-Michel. Rencontre avec une musicienne née : Renée Doria, l'étoile de l'Opéra-Comique. Actu.fr. 2013-07-29.
