= René Bianco =

French opera singer

- Born: 21 June 1908
- Origin: France
- Died: 23 January 2008
- Genres: Opera
- Occupation: Operatic baritone

René Bianco (21 June 1908 – 23 January 2008) was a French operatic baritone who performed at the Opéra Comique and the Paris Opera in a wide variety of leading roles.
