= First Prize (music diploma) =

Music diploma

A First Prize diploma in music (French: Premier Prix) is a high honor Diploma of Musical Studies, typically in performance or composition. It is awarded by European music conservatories and European-styled conservatories elsewhere. A First Prize diploma does not denote first in class, but rather, a very high level of artist proficiency. The typical period of study to earn a First Prize is one to two years. A First Prize diploma is sometimes wrongly described as being similar to a master's degree in music performance or composition. As of the mid-1990s, the degree in many European countries has been discontinued.

== France ==
At the Paris Conservatory, and at all government sanctioned institutions of higher learning in France, a Diploma of Musical Studies — the degree that offers the First Prize — was accredited by the French Ministry of Culture, but not as a higher education academic degree. A First Prize from any European government accredited or sanctioned conservatory is a major distinction.

=== First prize broadly discontinued; new diploma is instituted ===
Beginning around the late 1960s, First Prize degrees in all music disciplines, in a sense, became a victim of their own success. Holders of First Prizes, more and more, were gaining positions in comprehensive institutions of higher learning. In the mid-1990s, the Paris Conservatory, and all French government accredited conservatories, discontinued offering First Prizes with Diplomas of Musical Studies and replaced them with D.F.S. degrees — Diplomas of Superior Performance. The D.F.S. degree was instituted across Europe in part to incorporate comprehensive higher education in the fine arts with comprehensive universities and in part to unify standards in higher education of the Bologna Declaration that was adopted by 29 European countries (Note: The 29 countries that adopted the Bologna Declaration were Austria, Belgium, Bulgaria, Czech Republic, Denmark, Estonia, Finland, France, Germany, Greece, Hungary, Iceland, Ireland, Italy, Latvia, Lithuania, Luxembourg, Malta, Norway, Poland, Portugal, Romania, Slovak Republic, Slovenia, Spain, Sweden, Switzerland, the Netherlands, and the United Kingdom) in 1999.

== Quebec ==
First Prize degrees in Quebec are awarded upon attaining a high level of proficiency before a jury at the end of the fourth cycle of study at a conservatory — or two years. While two years of schooling equals the time required to earn a master's degree in Quebec, the scope of education does not offer the equivalence of a master's degree. Thus, a student who wishes to pursue doctoral studies might need compensatory education.

Music conservatories in Quebec fall under the purview of Quebec's Ministry of Culture and Communications. The Conservatory of Music and Drama in Quebec (fr) was founded in 1942 by Wilfrid Pelletier. Since then, Quebec has added a network of conservatories Gatineau, Rimouski, Saguenay, Trois-Rivières, and Val-d'Or.
