= Jane Rhodes =

French opera singer (1929–2011)

Jane Rhodes as Carmen at the New York Metropolitan Opera, 1960

Jane Marie Andrée Rhodes (13 March 1929 – 7 May 2011) was a French opera singer whose voice encompassed both the soprano and high mezzo-soprano ranges. Her most celebrated role was Carmen, which she sang in the opera's first ever staging at the Palais Garnier. She also created the roles of Isadora in Marcel Landowski's Le Fou and Maguelone in Georges Delerue's Le Chevalier de Neige and sang Renata in the first recorded performance of Prokofiev's The Fiery Angel. Admired for both her voice and her glamorous stage presence, she was nicknamed the "Bardot of the Opéra". She was married to conductor Roberto Benzi.

== Sources ==
- Agence France-Presse (May 7, 2011). "French opera singer Jane Rhodes dies"
- Diapason (May 8, 2011). "Jane Rhodes, l'une de nos plus belles Carmen, est morte"
- Driscoll, F. Paul (May 27, 2011). "Jane Rhodes, 82, French Soprano Nicknamed 'Bardot of the Opéra', Has Died". Opera News.
- Kuhn, Laura (ed.) (2000). "Rhodes, Jane (Marie Andrée)". Baker's Dictionary of Opera. Schirmer Books, p. 652. ISBN 0-02-865349-1
- L'Express (May 9, 2011). "La cantatrice Jane Rhodes est morte"
- Metropolitan Opera Archives. Performance Record: Rhodes, Jane (Soprano)
