= Georges Prêtre =

French conductor

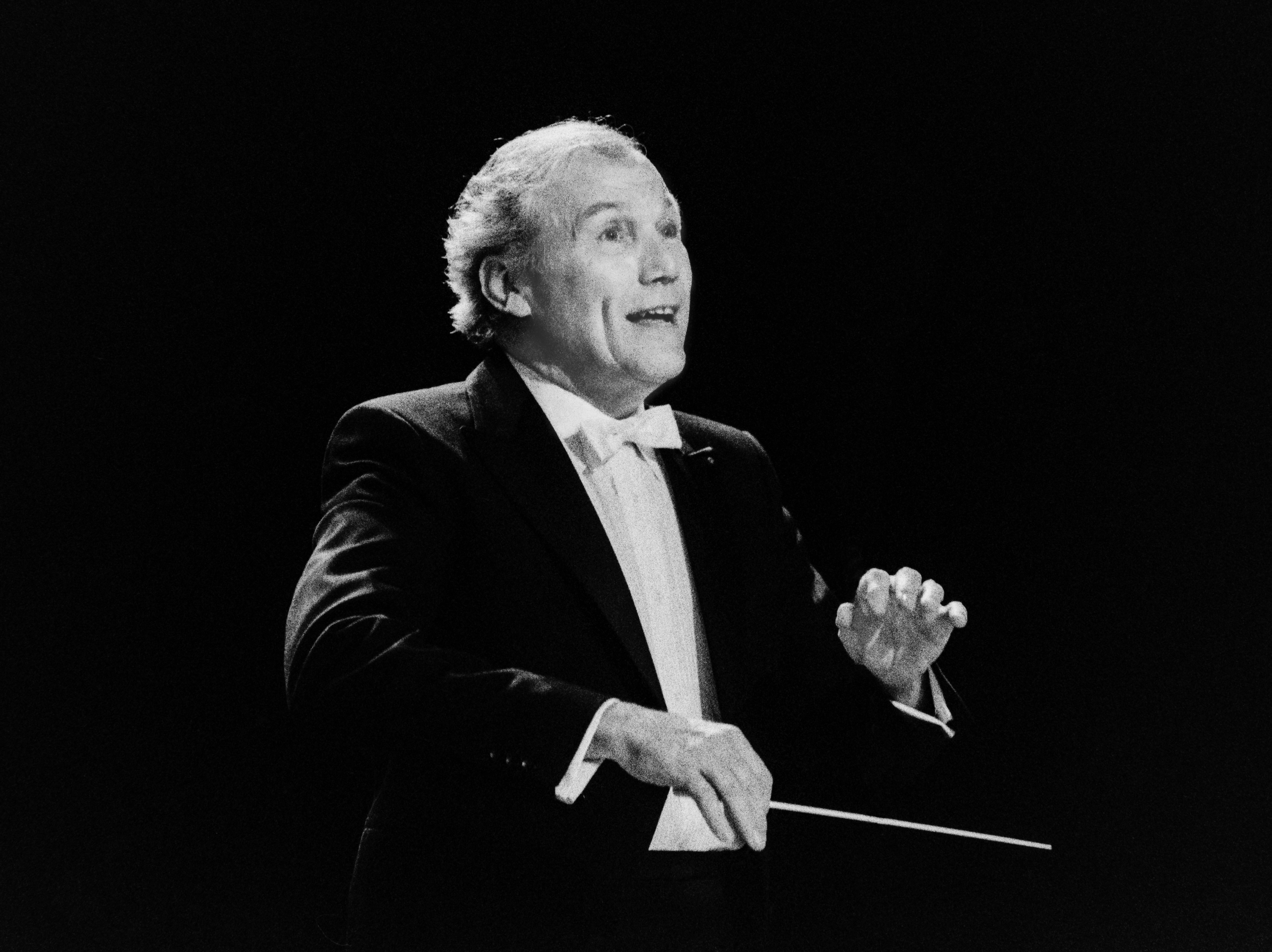

Background information
- Born: 14 August 1924; Waziers, Nord, France
- Died: 4 January 2017 (aged 92) Navès, Tarn, France
- Genres: Classical, opera
- Occupation: Conductor

Georges Prêtre (French pronunciation: [ʒɔʁʒ pʁɛːtʁ]; 14 August 1924 – 4 January 2017) was a French orchestral and opera conductor.

== Biography ==
Prêtre was born in Waziers (Nord), and attended the Douai Conservatory and then studied harmony under Maurice Duruflé and conducting under André Cluytens among others at the Conservatoire de Paris. Amongst his early musical interests were jazz and trumpet. After graduating, he conducted in a number of small French opera houses sometimes under the pseudonym Georges Dherain. His conducting debut was at the Opéra de Marseille in 1946. He also conducted at the opera houses in Lille and Toulouse. His Paris debut was at the Opéra-Comique in Richard Strauss's Capriccio. He was director of the Opéra-Comique 1955–1959. He conducted at the Lyric Opera of Chicago 1959–1971. He was conductor, 1959, and music director 1970–1971, at the Paris Opéra. He was principal conductor of the Vienna Symphony 1986–1991.

His Royal Opera House, Covent Garden, debut came in 1965, with first appearances at the Metropolitan Opera, New York City, and La Scala, Milan, also coming in the same decade. He worked with Maria Callas on a number of occasions, and made recordings of Carmen and Tosca with her.

Aside from opera, Prêtre was best known for performances of French music, having conducted long and difficult works like Debussy's La mer and Ravel's Daphnis et Chloé without a score (i.e. from memory). He is especially associated with Francis Poulenc, giving the premiere of his opera La voix humaine at the Opéra-Comique in 1959 and the first performance in France of his Sept répons des ténèbres in 1963. In 1999 he gave a series of concerts in Paris to celebrate the centenary of Poulenc's birth. In 1988 Marcel Landowski dedicated his Fourth Symphony to Prêtre. To many music lovers, however, Prêtre's name will forever be associated with the 1959 world premiere of Joseph Jongen's Symphonie Concertante for Organ and Orchestra, Op. 81, with Virgil Fox and the Paris Opera Orchestra. Eclectic musician, he also conducted in Vienna, in 1962, L'Opéra d'Aran by Gilbert Bécaud.

He conducted the La Scala Orchestra in Franco Zeffirelli's 1982 film versions of Mascagni's Cavalleria rusticana and Leoncavallo's Pagliacci. Both films starred Plácido Domingo. In 2009, at the age of 85, he returned to these two Italian operas in the Roman amphitheater at Orange, for televised performances starring Roberto Alagna.

Prêtre conducted the Vienna New Year's Concert twice, in 2008 and in 2010, the only French conductor to have been appointed for this role.

Prêtre married Gina Marny in 1950, and they had two children (one son, one daughter). Interests included riding, swimming, aviation, judo, and karate. Prêtre died in France on 4 January 2017, aged 92. He had a home in Navès (Tarn), near Castres.

== Awards ==
- Commander of the Order of Merit of the Italian Republic (1982)
- Grand Officier of the Order of Merit of the Italian Republic (1991)
- Europa Prize (1982)
- Honorary Conductor of the Vienna Symphony (Austria, 1991)
- Victoire de la Musique Award (for best conductor, 1997)
- Austrian Cross of Honour for Science and Art, 1st class (2004)
- Grand Officer of the Légion d'honneur (France, 2009)
