= Michel Plasson =

French conductor

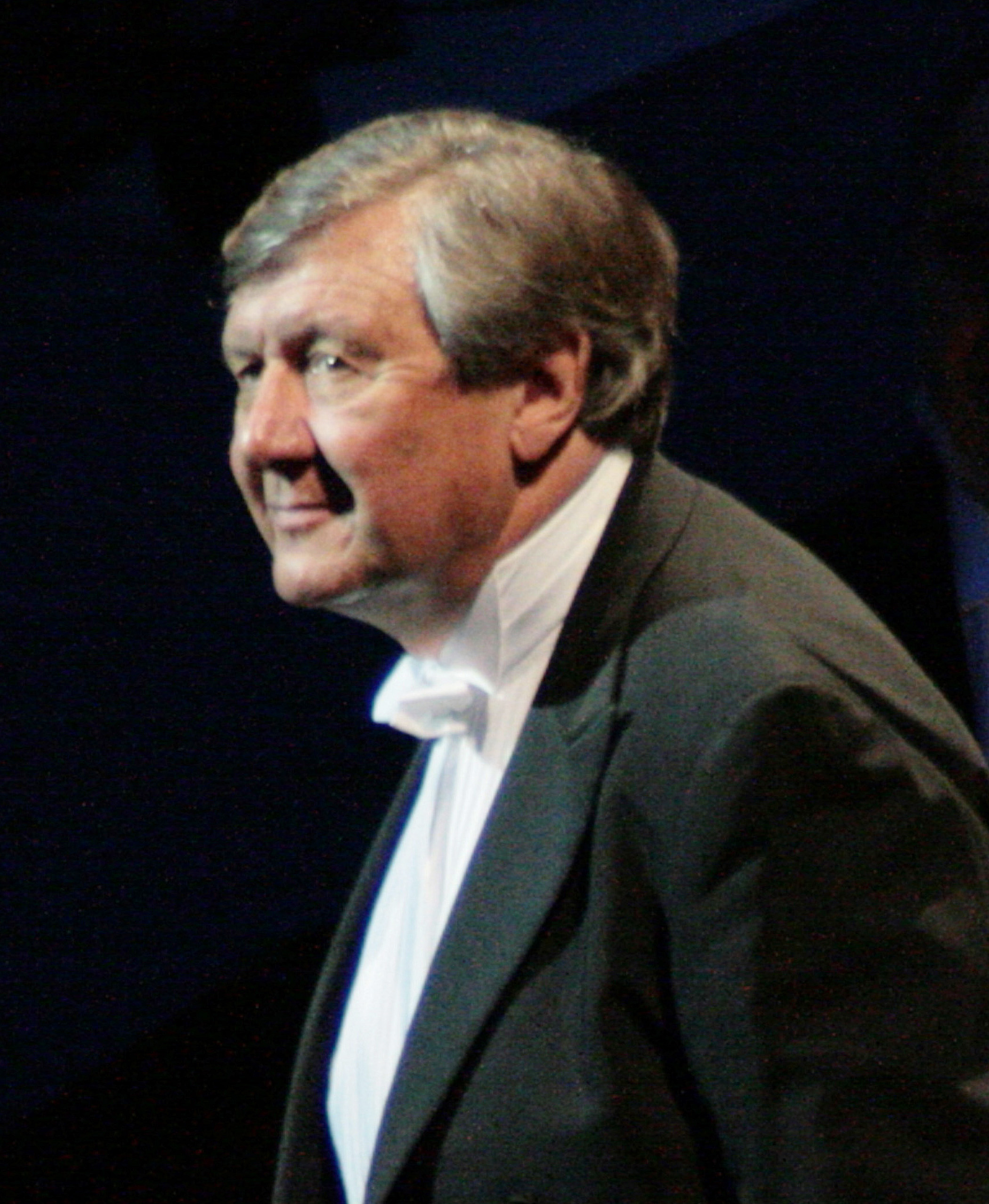

Michel Plasson (born 2 October 1933, Paris, France) is a French conductor.

Plasson was a student of Lazare Lévy at the Conservatoire de Paris. In 1962, he was a prize-winner at the International Besançon Competition for Young Conductors. He studied briefly in the United States, including time with Charles Münch. He became the music director of the city of Metz for 3 years.

In 1968, Plasson became principal conductor of the Orchestre et Chœurs du Capitole de Toulouse. His recordings with the orchestra include orchestral works, and operettas of Jacques Offenbach, including Orphée aux enfers, La Vie parisienne, La Périchole and La belle Hélène, and Bizet's Carmen. Plasson resigned as principal conductor in 2003 and now has the title of "Honorary Conductor", or conductor emeritus. From 1994 to 2001, he was principal conductor of the Dresden Philharmonic.

Guest appearances include Grand Théâtre de Genève, De Nederlandse Opera (Amsterdam) and the Royal Opera House, Covent Garden.

Plasson's son Emmanuel Plasson is also a conductor.

== Selected discography ==
Plasson's recordings were mainly made for EMI/Virgin, and focused upon works by French composers. Among these recordings, his interpretations for the operatic works by Offenbach, Gounod and Massenet were generally considered as excellent by critics.

Berlioz

- Chansons, with Rolando Villazón, Lauren Naouri, and Nicolas Rivenq.

Bizet

- L'Arlésienne - complete incidental music, with Orchestre du Capitole de Toulouse.
- Carmen, with Angela Gheorghiu, Roberto Alagna, Thomas Hampson and Inva Mula.
- Les pêcheurs de perles, with Barbara Hendricks, John Aler and Gino Quilico.

Chabrier

- Orchestral Works (España (Chabrier), Suite pastorale, Joyeuse marche, excerpts from Le roi malgré lui), with Barbara Hendricks (À la musique), Susan Mentzer (La Sulamite) and Pierre Del Vescovo (Larghetto).

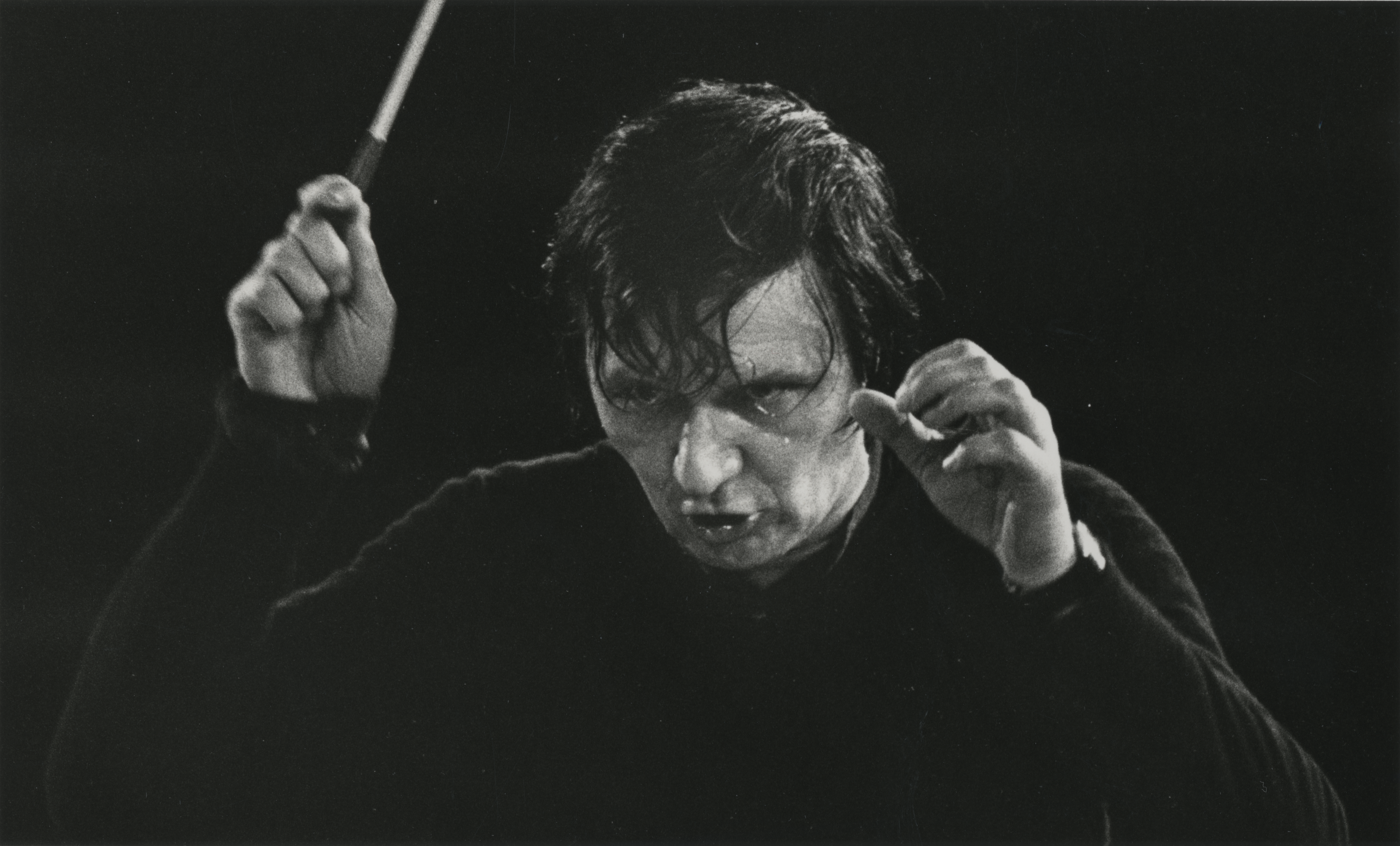
Michel Plasson conducting

Debussy

- Orchestral Works, with Orchestre du Capitole de Toulouse.

Delibes

- Lakmé, with Natalie Dessay, Gregory Kunde, and José van Dam.

Duruflé

- Requiem, and other Religious Works, with Anne Sofie von Otter, Thomas Hampson and Marie-Claire Alain.

Fauré

- Orchestral Works, with Orchestre du Capitole de Toulouse.

Gardel

- 15 Tangos, with Orchestre du Capitole de Toulouse.

Gounod

- Faust, with Richard Leech (tenor), Cheryl Studer, José van Dam and Thomas Hampson.
- Mireille, with Mirella Freni, Alain Vanzo and José van Dam.
- Two recordings of Roméo et Juliette, the first one starring Alfredo Kraus, Catherine Malfitano, José Van Dam and Gino Quilico, the second one with Angela Gheorghiu, Roberto Alagna, José van Dam and Simon Keenlyside.

Lalo

- Symphonie espagnole and Violin Concerto, with Augustin Dumay.

Landowski

- Montségur, with Karan Armstrong and Gino Quilico, 1987.

Magnard

- Four symphonies, and orchestral works (1983, 1988, 1990)
- Guercoeur, with José van Dam, Hildegard Behrens and Orchestre du Capitole de Toulouse, 1986.

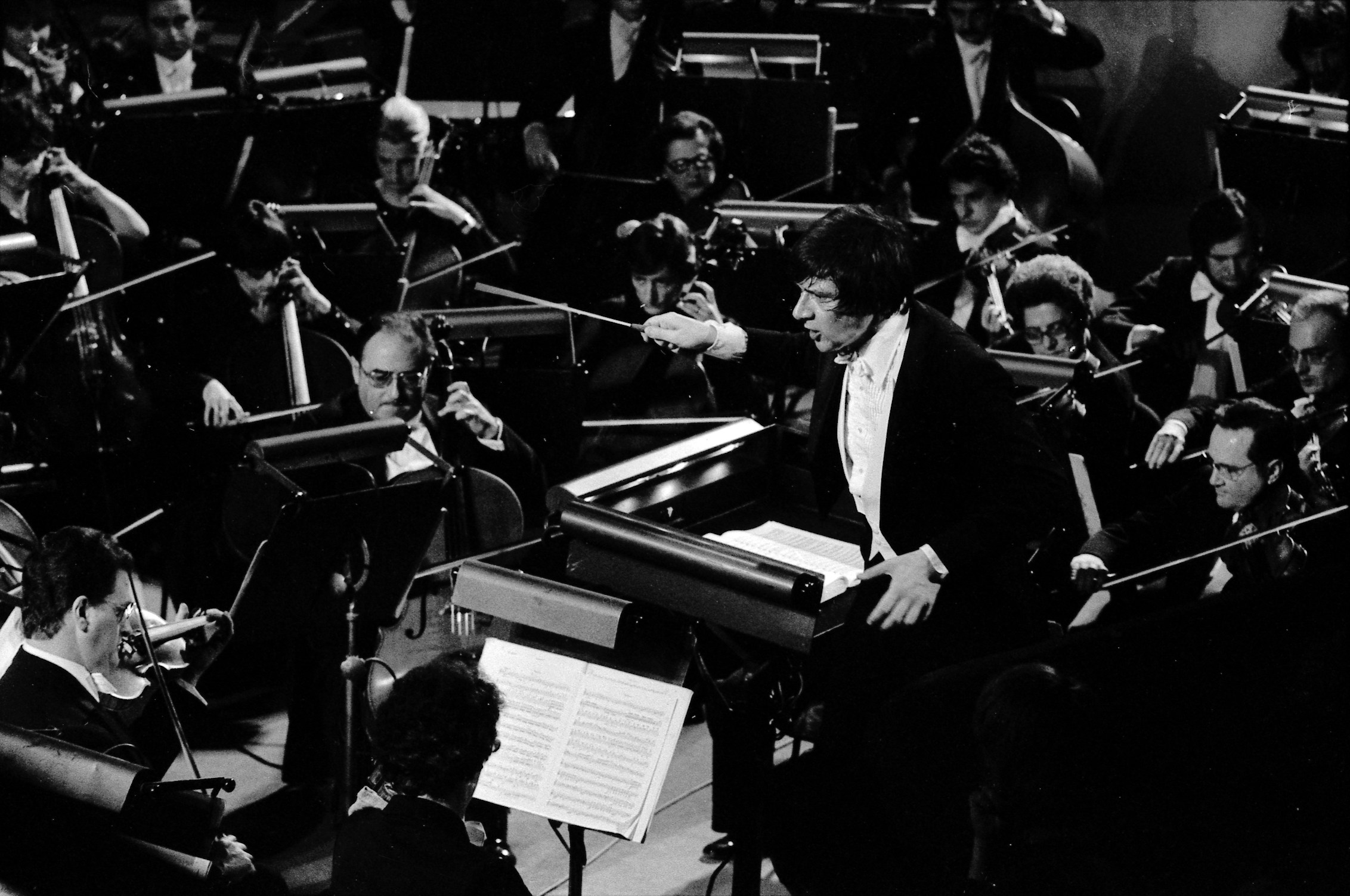
Michel Plasson conducting Fidelio in Toulouse, 1975.

Massenet

- Don Quichotte, with Teresa Berganza, José van Dam and Alain Fondary.
- Hérodiade, with Cheryl Studer, José van Dam, Thomas Hampson and Ben Heppner.
- Manon, with Ileana Cotrubaș, Alfredo Kraus, Gino Quilico and José Van Dam.
- Werther, with Alfredo Kraus, Tatiana Troyanos, and Matteo Manuguerra.

Offenbach

- La belle Hélène, with Jessye Norman, John Aler, Charles Burles, Jean-Philippe Lafont and Gabriel Bacquier.
- Orphée aux enfers, with Mady Mesplé, Jane Rhodes, Jane Berbié, Charles Burles and Michel Sénéchal.
- La Périchole, with Teresa Berganza, José Carreras and Gabriel Bacquier.
- La Vie parisienne, with Mady Mesplé and Régine Crespin.

Orff

- Carmina Burana, with Natalie Dessay, Thomas Hampson and Gérard Lesne.

Ravel

- Mélodies, with Teresa Berganza, Felicity Lott.

Saint-Saëns

- Complete Piano Concertos 1-5, Philippe Entremont, piano, the Orchestre du Capitole de Toulouse, conducted by Michel Plasson. 2 CD CBS Masterworks 1989. Recorded 1971 & 1978.
- Organ symphony n°3, op.78, Cyprès et Lauriers, op.156, La Foi, 3 tableaux symphoniques op.130, the Orchestre du Capitole de Toulouse, conducted by Michel Plasson. 2 CD Emi classics 1997

Verdi

- Jérusalem, with Alan Fondary, Verónica Villarroel, Carlo Colombara, Ivan Momirov, Federica Bragaglia, Giorgio Casciarri, Teatro Carlo Felice of Genoa, Tdk DVD Video (2000)

External audio
- You may hear Michel Plasson conducting Jules Massenet's opera Hérodiade with Thomas Hampson, Cheryl Studer, Nadine Denize, Ben Heppner and the Orchestre national du Capitole de Toulouse in 1995 Here on archive.org
