= Jérusalem =

Opera by Giuseppe Verdi

- Grand opera by Giuseppe Verdi
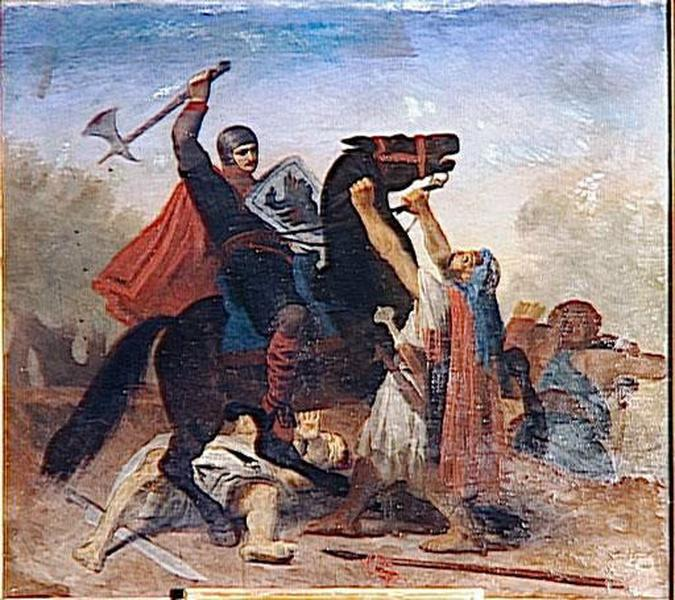
- "Tancred of Hauteville, the siege of Jerusalem" by Émile Signol
- Librettist: Alphonse Royer; Gustave Vaëz
- Language: French
- Based on: Verdi's I Lombardi alla prima crociata of 1843
- Premiere: 26 November 1847; Salle Le Peletier (The Paris Opéra)

Jérusalem is a grand opera in four acts by Giuseppe Verdi. The libretto was to be an adaptation and partial translation of the composer's original 1843 Italian opera, I Lombardi alla prima crociata. It was the one opera which he regarded as the most suitable for being translated into French and, taking Eugène Scribe's advice, Verdi agreed that a French libretto was to be prepared by Alphonse Royer and Gustave Vaëz, who had written the libretto for Donizetti's most successful French opera, La favorite. The opera received its premiere performance at the Salle Le Peletier in Paris on 26 November 1847. The maiden production was designed by Paul Lormier (costumes), Charles Séchan, Jules Diéterle and Édouard Desplechin (sets of Act I, Act II, scene 1, Act III scene 1, and Act IV), and Charles-Antoine Cambon and Joseph Thierry (sets for Act II, scene 2 and Act III, scene 2).

== Composition history ==
The director of the Paris Opéra, Léon Pillet, had invited Verdi to compose an opera for the company in November 1845 and February 1846, but initially Verdi declined. This was the composer's first encounter with the Académie Royale de Musique, as the Paris Opéra was officially known. Among 19th-century Italian composers, there had been an increasing interest in writing for Paris, where the combination of money, prestige, and flexibility of style were appealing. Musicologist Julian Budden provides examples of those composers who had crossed the Alps, the most well-known being Rossini and Donizetti (as well as Vincenzo Bellini who, before he died in 1835, was planning a French grand opera.)

However, Verdi had given some consideration of the idea of adapting one of the librettos written by Temistocle Solera in earlier years, librettos which music historian David Kimball regards as having something of grand opera in their structure.

After conducting the premiere of I masnadieri in London and within a week of Verdi's arrival in Paris on 27 July 1847, he received his first commission from the company, agreeing to adapt I Lombardi to a new French libretto. The adaptation meant that Verdi could "try his hand at grand opera" without having to write something entirely new, a strategy which both Donizetti and Rossini had employed for their Paris debuts.

There are significant changes in the location and action of the French version of Lombardi, especially given the need to set the story for French involvement in the First Crusade of 1095–1099. Characters' names changed from Italian to French and one, Arvino (who was renamed as the Count of Toulouse, though elements of his character were given to the principal tenor role, Gaston) was now a baritone instead of a tenor. Several roles present in the original version were deleted, including the leading tenor role of Oronte. In the restructured libretto, the central romance is given more prominence, and a happier ending. In addition, Verdi added a standard ballet and new music, but re-shaped much of the structure by removing inappropriate material he felt to be weak. As musicologist Roger Parker notes, "only a few of the original numbers [remain] in their former positions." Verdi himself described the new work as having "transformed [I Lombardi] out of recognition".

== Verdi in Paris, July 1847 to July 1849 ==
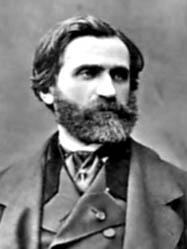
Verdi about 1850

During this period in Paris, Verdi was to work on and complete the score for Jérusalem. From Paris, he fulfilled the obligation to write the opera Il corsaro from a libretto by Francesco Maria Piave which took place in Trieste in October 1848. Also, he worked with Salvadore Cammarano on two librettos, one for La battaglia di Legnano (then attend its January 1849 Rome premiere), the other being Luisa Miller which was presented in Naples in December 1849 after Verdi's return to Italy.

Many writers, including Baldini and Frank Walker, have speculated on supposed relationships which Verdi, a man then close to (and then in) his thirties, might have had (or did have) with women in the years following his first wife's death. However, the only real evidence, visible in Walker's The Man Verdi and Baldini's The Story of Giuseppe Verdi, relates to Giuseppina Strepponi, the singer who Verdi first encountered at the time he was writing Nabucco in 1842. She sang the first Abigaille, and continued on and off with that role in spite of her declining voice up to her retirement and move to Paris in October 1846 where she became a singing teacher in November and also planned a concert of Verdi's music for the following June.

It is known that the two had conducted friendly correspondence over several years and that Strepponi had offered various pieces of advice to the composer. As is known, Verdi and Emanuele Muzio had arrived in Paris on 2 June 1847 en route to London for I masnadieri, and the composer had sent Muzio on to London to make sure that Jenny Lind, about whom rumours of her reluctance to come to England abounded, was already present and ready to go to work. While Verdi remained in the city, Mary Jane Phillips-Matz in her massive biography of the composer, speculates that Verdi saw her in the three days he was present.

On 27 July 1847, having left London, Verdi returned to Paris. To friends in Italy, he had written from London (or wrote from Paris) about "being able to lead the life I wish" and "intend[ing] to stay a month in Paris, if I liked it". With the exception of a return to Italy after the 18 March 1848 bloody uprising in Milan against the Austrians (when the composer was away from early April to mid-May) and the period of overseeing the rehearsals of La battaglia di Legnano in Rome (from before Christmas 1848 to early February 1849 after its premiere on 27 January 1849), Verdi remained in Paris.

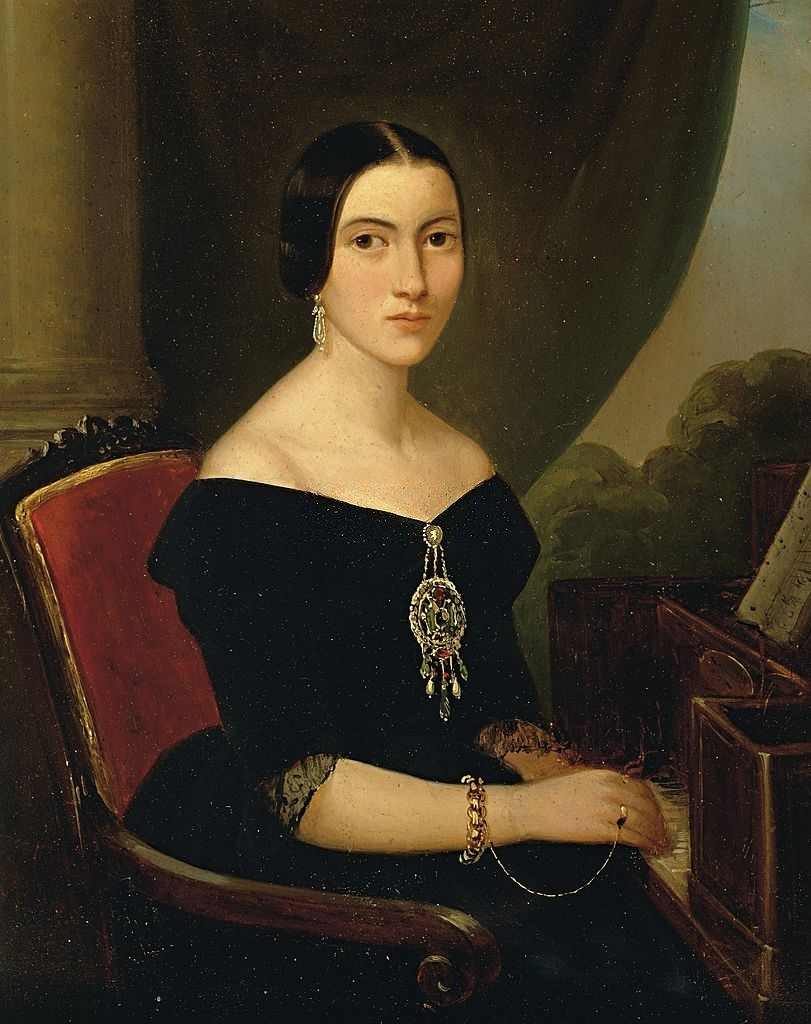
Giuseppina Strepponi (c. 1845) (Museo Teatrale alla Scala)

However, as far as the relationship with Strepponi proceeded, Phillips-Matz recounts that Verdi was "living in an apartment around the corner from Strepponi's house", that the news of this had reached Italy ("Verdi had been seen chez Strepponi"), and that, in writing the music for Jérusalem, he had received her help to the extent that a handwritten love duet in the composer's autograph score contains alternative lines in her handwriting and in his. This is described by British music critic Andrew Porter as "one of the more romantic discoveries of recent years".

Baldini tells us that "at the end of 1847 Verdi rented a little house in Passy, and went to live there with Giuseppina", but Phillips-Matz does not go so far, noting only that "he may have moved into her apartment or a separate apartment in her building", but later does confirm the move to Passy, dating it to June 1848.

However, the couple were to remain together for many years, and when the time came to leave Paris, Verdi left in late July and "made straight for Busseto to wait for her there", while it appear that Strepponi visited her family in Florence and Pavia before joining him.

== Performance history ==
19th century

Given by the Opéra at the Salle Le Peletier, the premiere of the opera took place on 26 November 1847, but even while writing the French version and before its premiere, Verdi had contacted his publisher, Giovanni Ricordi, regarding an Italian version. He did not find a translator while in Paris, but in 1850, the French text was translated into Italian by Calisto Bassi and performed as Gerusalemme at La Scala, Milan on 26 December 1850. However, "it failed to supersede I Lombardi in the affections of Italian audiences" and certainly, as Parker comments, while overall being superior to Lombardi in various ways, "it failed to establish itself in either the French or the Italian repertory".

However, the opera was given in Turin in 1850 and between 1854 and 1865, in Venice, Verona and Rome (twice).

The US premiere was presented at the Théâtre d'Orleans in New Orleans on 24 January 1850.

20th century and beyond

In Italy, conductor Gianandrea Gavazzeni staged the opera in Italian at La Fenice in Venice in 1963. Two years later, in May 1965, when the La Fenice company were in Munich, they gave a performance in Italian under Ettore Gracis, the Gaston being sung by Giacomo Aragall, the Count by Renato Bruson, Ruggero by Ruggero Raimondi, and Elena by Leyla Gencer.

1975 saw an Italian radio/television (RAI) production of a concert version of the opera in French with Katia Ricciarelli and José Carreras.

Given in the original French, the opera was staged by the Opéra in Paris in March/April 1984 under Donato Renzetti with Alain Fondary singing the role of the Count. The Teatro Regio in Parma presented the opera (in French) in 1986 with Ricciarelli and Cesare Siepi. It was broadcast in French in Britain under Edward Downes with the BBC Philharmonic Orchestra on 11 May 1986, and June Anderson was featured in the cast as Hélène.

In the 1990s, Jérusalem appeared under Zubin Mehta, also in French, at the Vienna State Opera with a cast including José Carreras (as Gaston) and Samuel Ramey (as Roger). It took over 140 years for the opera to be given its UK premiere by Opera North on 31 March 1990 at the Grand Theatre in Leeds. The Opera Orchestra of New York presented a concert performance in February 1998.

In 1998 Fabio Luisi recorded the work in the studio in Geneva with the Orchestre de la Suisse Romande. Marcello Giordani sang Gaston, Philippe Rouillon (the Count), and Marina Mescheriakova (Hélène). In November/December 2000 it was performed at the Teatro Carlo Felice in Genoa using an arrangement of the score "based on Verdi's Paris autograph," which has to be regarded as the most authentic, as long as there is no critical, complete Verdi edition," and these performances were recorded and released on DVD.Verónica Villarroel sang the role of Hélène.

In Europe, performances were given by Oper Frankfurt in April 2003 and by the Vienna State Opera in April 2004. There was a recording made of a concert performance in the Concertgebouw, Amsterdam on 22 January 2005 with Nelly Miricioiu as Hélène.

This opera was performed in March 2014 by Sarasota Opera as part of its "Verdi Cycle" of all the composer's works to be presented by 2016. Other companies in Bilbao, Spain (the "Tutto Verdi" series presented by ABAO) and Parma's Teatro Regio with its "Festival Verdi" have also presented all of Verdi's operas.

== Roles ==
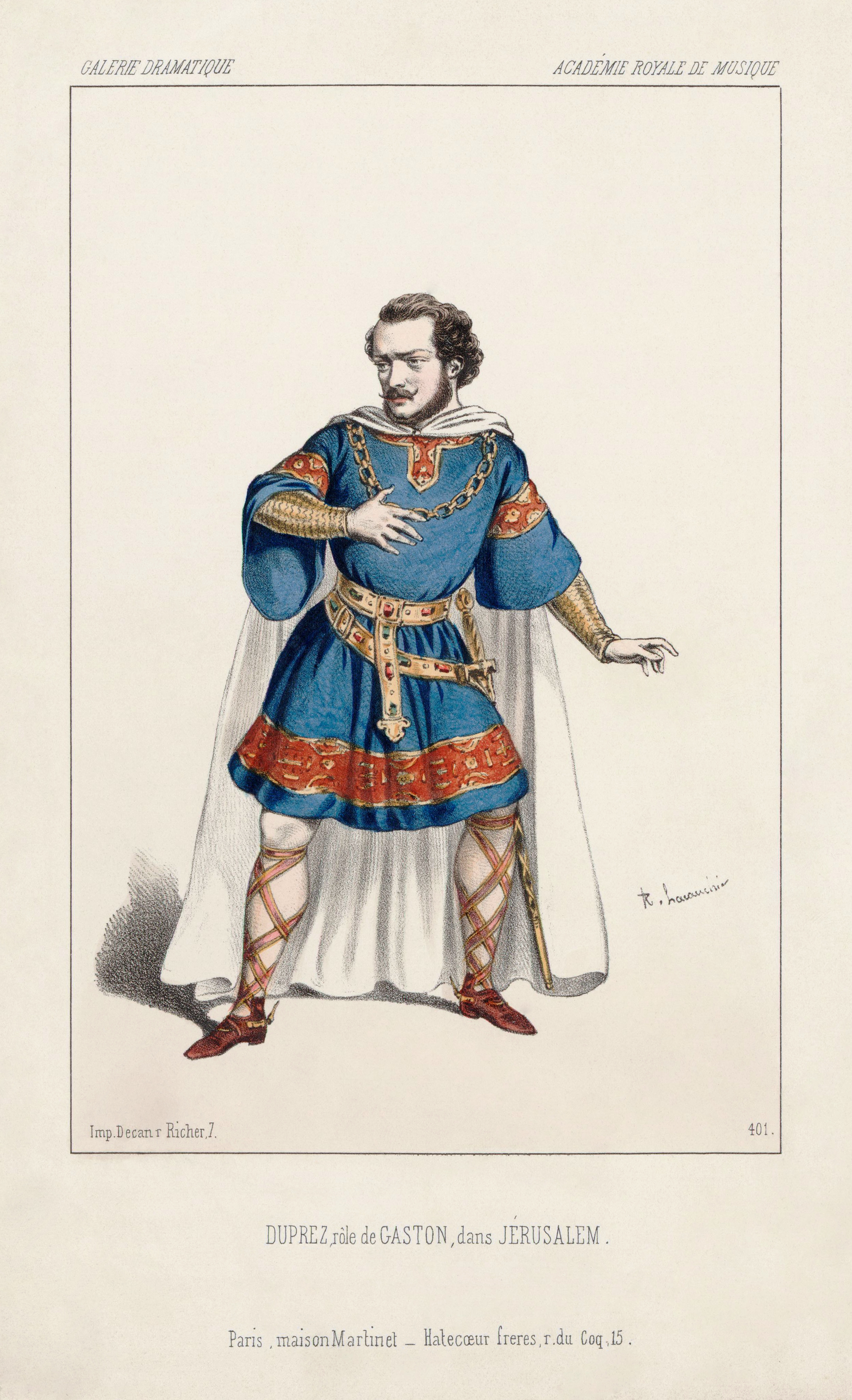
Gilbert Duprez as Gaston

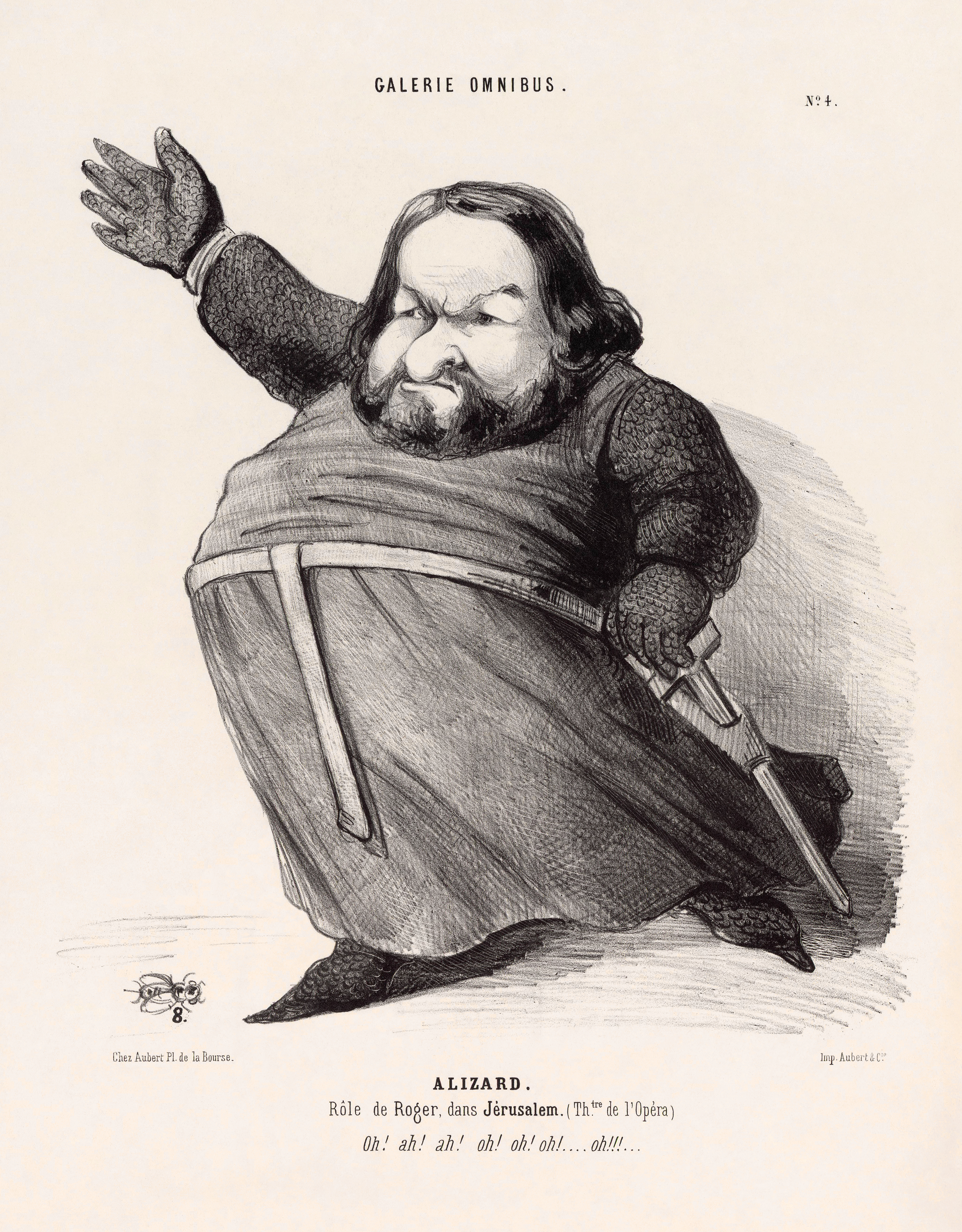
Adolphe Louis Joseph Alizard as Roger in Jérusalem

Role	Voice type	Premiere Cast, 26 November 1847 (Conductor: - )
Gaston, Viscount of Béarn	tenor	Gilbert Duprez
The Count of Toulouse	baritone	Charles Portheaute
Roger, the Count's brother	bass	Adolphe Louis Joseph Alizard
Hélène, the Count's daughter	soprano	Mme Julian Van Gelder
Isaure, her companion	soprano	Mme Müller
Adhemar de Monteil, Papal Legate	bass	Hippolyte Bremont
Raymond, Gaston's squire	tenor	M. Barbot
A Soldier	bass	M. Prevost
A Herald	bass	M. Molinier
The Emir of Ramla	bass	M. Guignot
An officer of the Emir	tenor	M. Koenig
Knights, ladies, pages, soldiers, pilgrims, penitents, and executioner, Arab sheiks, women of the harem, and people of Ramla

== Synopsis ==
Time: 1095 and 1099 AD
Place: Toulouse (Act 1); Palestine, near Jerusalem (Acts 2–4)

=== Act 1 ===
Scene 1: The palace of the Count of Toulouse

Late at night Hélène is with her lover, Gaston. His family and hers have long been in conflict, but on the following day and prior to Gaston's departure for the First Crusade, it has been agreed that there will be a solemn reconciliation between the two families. (Duet: Adieu, mon bien-aimé / "Farewell, my beloved!"). After he leaves, Hélène and her companion, Isaure, pray for Gaston's safety.

Scene 2: The following morning outside the chapel

The Count proclaims the reconciliation and gives Gaston Hélène's hand in marriage. However, standing to one side, Roger, the Count's brother is quietly furious, since he is in love with Hélène. He leaves, after which the Papal Legate announces that the Pope has appointed Gaston to lead the Crusade, Gaston swears to follow him and he is awarded the Count's white cloak as a symbol of his loyalty. They enter the chapel. Returning, Roger proclaims his hatred of Gaston (Aria: Oh dans l'ombre, dans la mystère / "Oh! In darkness and mystery remain hidden, guilty passion") and approaches a soldier with whom he has plotted to kill his rival. He instructs the soldier to kill the man who will not be wearing the white cloak. (Aria: Ah! Viens, démon, esprit du mal / "Ah, come, demon, spirit of evil").

From inside the chapel the sound of uproar is heard. The soldier-murderer rushes out pursued by others while Roger gloats in his triumph. But it is Gaston who emerges, announcing that the Count has been struck down. The captured murderer is brought in before Roger; quietly Roger arranges for him to point to Gaston as the one who instigated the murder. Although protesting his innocence, Gaston is cursed by all and ordered into exile by the Papal Legate.

=== Act 2 ===
Scene 1: A cave near Ramla in Palestine

Remorseful, Roger has been wandering for years in the desert and he cries out for forgiveness. (Aria: Ô jour fatal, ô crime / "O dreadful day, o my crime!"). Unexpectedly, Raymond, Gaston's squire, appears in a state of exhaustion and he begs Roger, whom he believes to be a holy man, for help, telling him that others of his Crusader group are lost. Roger hurries off to help them. Hélène and Isaure come down the pathway seeking the hermit who they think can tell them of Gaston's fate. They are surprised to find Raymond, who tells them that Gaston is still alive but held captive in Ramla. While expressing her joy, Hélène and Isaure are led towards the town by Raymond (Aria: Quell'ivresse, bonheur suprême / "What rapture! Supreme happiness! God has protected the man I love ...").

A group of distraught pilgrims climbs down from the hills around the cave. They are met by a band of newly arrived Crusaders led by the Count, who praises God for saving him from the assassin's dagger, and the Papal Legate. Roger appears requesting that he may be allowed to join them in their battle and the three proclaim their anticipated victory (Trio and chorus: Le Seigneur nous promet la victoire! O bonheur! / "The Lord promises us victory! Oh joy!").

Scene 2: The palace of the Emir of Ramla

Gaston is admitted and expresses his desire to be close to Hélène again. He begins to plan his escape (Aria: Je veux encore entendre.. / "I want to hear your voice again") when the Emir arrives and advises him that escape will result in his death. At that moment, Hélène, having been captured in the city, is brought in. The couple pretends not to know one another, but the Emir is suspicious. However, they are left alone and are joyous in their reunion, until Gaston attempts to dissuade Hélène from associating with him in his dishonor (Aria: Dans la honte et l'épouvante / "You cannot share in the horror and shame of my wandering life!"). She remains firmly resolved to remain with him. From a window, they see the approaching Crusaders and, in the chaos, determine to escape but are thwarted by the arrival of the Emir's soldiers.

=== Act 3 ===
Scene 1: The harem gardens

Hélène is surrounded by the ladies of the harem who express some sympathy with her plight. But, when the Emir enters and is told that the Christians are close to attacking the city, he orders that if the invaders are successful, Hélène's head should be thrown to the Count. In despair, she considers the uselessness of her life (Aria: Que m'importe la vie / "What does life matter to me in my extreme unhappiness" and Mes plaintes mes plaintes sont vaines / "My laments are in vain").

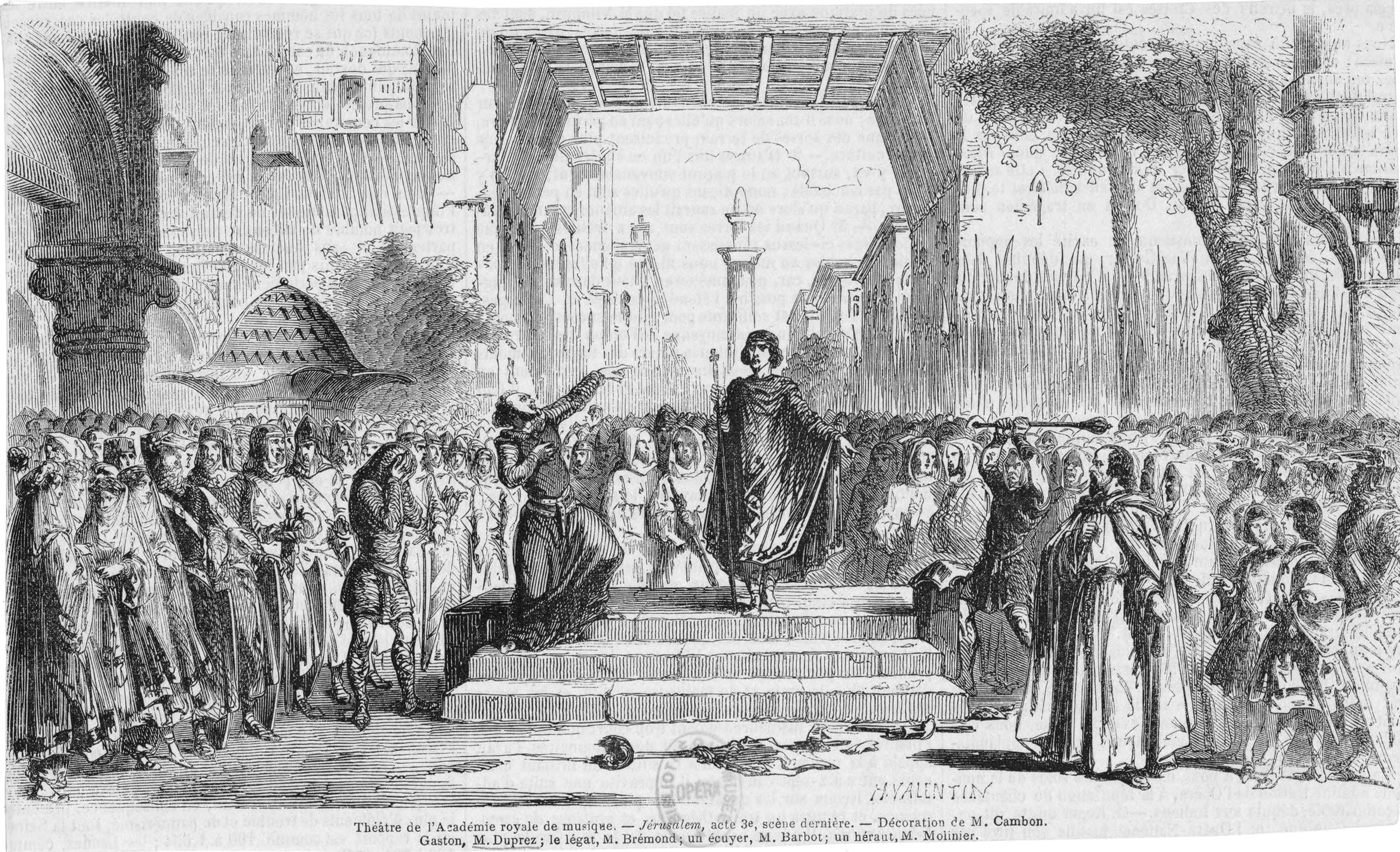
Illustration of Act 3, scene 2 (1847) after the Paris premiere

Gaston has escaped and rushes in to find Hélène, but their joy is short-lived as the Crusaders, led by the Count, burst into the room and demand Gaston's death, still believing that he was responsible for the attempt on the Count's life. Defiantly, Hélène challenges the Crusaders (Aria: Non ... non votre rage / "No ... no, your anger, your unworthy outrage") as well as her father ("The shame and crime are yours!"). The Count drags her away.

Scene 2: A scaffold in a public square in Ramla

Gaston is brought in and the Legate tells him that he has been condemned by the Pope and, following his public disgrace that day, he will be executed the following day. Gaston pleads for his honor to remain intact (Aria: O mes amis, mes frères d'armes / "O my friends, my brothers-in-arms"), but the smashing of his helmet, shield, and sword take place.

=== Act 4 ===
Scene 1: The edge of the Crusaders' camp

The hermit Roger is alone near the camp. A procession of Crusaders and women arrives, Hélène amongst them. The procession continues on, although Hélène hangs back as the Legate approaches Roger and asks him to give some comfort to the condemned man who is then brought out. Gaston is brought out, but Roger refuses to give him his blessing. Instead, he hands his sword to Gaston urging him to place his hands on its hilt where it forms a cross and then to go off and fight for the Lord.

Scene 2: The Count's tent

Hélène and Isaure wait for news of the outcome of the battle for Jerusalem. They hear shouts of victory from outside and the Count, the Legate, and Crusaders enter followed by Gaston with the visor of his helmet closed. Praised for his bravery and asked to reveal his identity, Gaston announces that he is now prepared to be executed. Just then, the mortally wounded Roger is brought in and reveals himself as the Count's brother. He begs for mercy for Gaston and confesses to being the one who planned the murder which almost resulted in his brother's death. All rejoice at the restoration of Gaston's honor and position, as Roger takes one final look at Jerusalem and he dies.

== Music ==
In describing the changes made to the original opera, Budden observes that the revised version has far greater strengths than those acknowledged by many Italian and English writers and that "the diffuse drama which Solera had distilled from an epic poem is replaced by a far tauter, more concentrated plot which not only makes fewer demands on our credulity than I Lombardi but also avoids the problem of a second tenor who needs to be weightier and more heroic than the first." He continues by acknowledging that the newly composed numbers and the repositioning of the original ones were:

soldered together by linking passages of far greater significance than the string-accompanied recitative which they replace. The entire opera, as befits one designed for the French stage, is more "through-composed" than its parent work; and only a sentimentalist could regret the omission of all that was most embarrassingly naïf in the original score.

Roger Parker finds two particularly strong elements in the French version: firstly, "that by converting Arvino from a tenor to a baritone, [he] solves one of the problems of vocal distribution that occurred [in the original]" and, secondly, that this version "serves as a fascinating first document in charting Verdi's relationship with the French stage, a relationship that was to become increasingly important during the next decade."

Not surprisingly, Budden (and others writing on the subject over the past 30 years, including Baldini who calls it "a tired, disheartened reshuffle"), regard Jérusalem as "something less than a masterpiece", but his chapter concludes with a summary of what the experience of working in Paris did for Verdi and the part it played in moving the composer forward towards his mature style: "It fixed his dramatic imagination, refined his scoring, sharpened his harmonic palate; and in general made possible the amazing advances of the next few years."

== Recordings ==
Year	Cast (Gaston, Hélène, Count of Toulouse, Roger)	Conductor, Opera House and Orchestra	Label
1998	Marcello Giordani, Marina Mescheriakova, Philippe Rouillon, Roberto Scandiuzzi	Fabio Luisi, Orchestre de la Suisse Romande, Chorus of Grand Théatre de Genève	Audio CD: Philips; Cat: 462-613-2
2000	Ivan Momirov, Veronica Villarroel, Alain Fondary, Carlo Colombara	Michel Plasson, Teatro Carlo Felice Orchestra and Chorus (Recorded at the Teatro Carlo Felice, November)	Audio CD: Premiere Opera; Cat:CDNO 4922; DVD: TDK; Cat: DVUS-OPJER
2004	José Carreras, Katia Ricciarelli, Alessandro Cassis, Sigmund Nimsgern	Gianandrea Gavazzeni, RAI Orchestra and Chorus, Turin, (Broadcast performance Turin, 20 December 1975	Audio CD: Opera d’Oro; Cat: OPD-1407
