= Alphonse Royer =

French author, dramatist and theatre manager

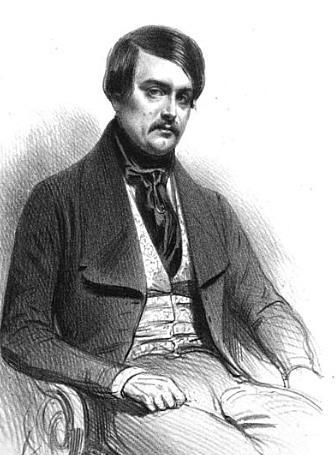
- Born: 10 September 1803; Paris, France
- Died: 11 April 1875 (aged 71); Paris, France
- Occupations: writer; theatre manager

Alphonse Royer (10 September 1803 – 11 April 1875) was a French writer, dramatist and theatre manager, most remembered today for having written (with his regular collaborator, Gustave Vaëz) the librettos for Gaetano Donizetti's opera La favorite and Giuseppe Verdi's Jérusalem. From 1853 to 1856, he was the director of the Odéon Theatre and from 1856 to 1862 director of the Paris Opéra, after which he was appointed France's Inspecteur Général des Beaux-Arts (Inspector General for the Fine Arts). In his later years, he wrote a six volume history of the theatre and a history of the Paris Opéra. He also translated the theatrical works of the Italian dramatist Carlo Gozzi, as well those of the Spanish writers, Miguel de Cervantes, Tirso de Molina, and Juan Ruiz de Alarcón. A Chevalier and later Officier of the Légion d'honneur, Royer died in Paris, the city of his birth, at the age of 71.

== Biography ==
=== Early years and first success ===
Alphonse Royer was born in Paris to a prosperous family with various commercial interests. His father was a commissaire-priseur (auctioneer) and lawyer. As a young man, Royer belonged to a literary circle inspired by Romanticism and Liberalism, movements for which he maintained a sympathy throughout his life. He initially trained to be a lawyer, but was more interested in poetry and the theatre and longed to travel. His father sent him abroad where for several years he travelled in Italy and the Middle East, and carried out several minor diplomatic and business missions. Royer was in Constantinople during the 1826 revolt of the Janissaries against Mahmud II and later wrote an account of it in his 1844 novel, Les janissaires. His experiences during those years also served as the inspirations for several other works, including his novels Venezia la bella (1834) and Robert Macaire en Orient (1840) and a collection of novellas, Un Divan (1834). On his return to Paris, Royer made his literary debut with a novel set in the Middle Ages, Les Mauvais Garçons, which he co-authored with Henri Auguste Barbier. It was published in 1830, the same year as his first venture into drama, Henry V et ses compagnons, co-authored with Auguste Romieu. The play premiered to great success at the Théâtre des Nouveautés on 27 February 1830 with incidental music by Giacomo Meyerbeer, Carl Maria von Weber, and Louis Spohr.

=== Librettist and playwright ===
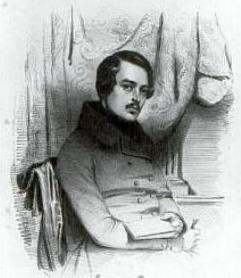
Gustave Vaëz

In the ensuing years, Royer wrote several more novels and plays, contributed articles to a variety of Parisian periodicals, and formed a close friendship and working partnership with the Belgian playwright and poet, Gustave Vaëz. Their first major collaboration was the translation and adaptation of Donizetti's opera, Lucia di Lammermoor for the French stage. The successful premiere of Lucie de Lammermoor, at the Théâtre de la Renaissance in 1839 led to several similar commissions, as well as commissions for original librettos, most notably Donizetti's La favorite (1840), and Verdi's Jérusalem (1847). During the period of the July Monarchy, Royer and Vaëz became a major force in the adaptation of Italian operas for French audiences and had a virtual monopoly of the Italian repertoire at the Académie Royale de Musique. They always worked closely with the composers and were praised for the way their writing respected the movement and rhythm of the music. In the case of translated librettos, this was made all the more difficult by having to adapt their poetry to a pre-existing score intended to be sung in another language. An anonymous critic in L'Illustration wrote of their translation for Rossini's Otello:

By virtue of work and skill, MM. Royer and Vaëz have forced our language, so cold and so unmalleable, so constrained by consonants, so loaded with epithets, to enter without too many cuts and bruises into this narrow and flexible mode of Italian poetry.

Although their collaboration on the Italian operatic repertoire ended in 1847 with Jérusalem, they later wrote the original libretto for François-Auguste Gevaert's 1853 opéra comique, Georgette ou Le moulin de Fontenoy. In addition to their work on opera librettos, Royer and Vaëz co-wrote many plays, ranging from serious drama to comédie en vaudeville, several of which premiered at the Théâtre de l'Odéon.

During this period, Royer had also achieved a minor reputation as an orientalist, partly though his novels and travel writing which were widely read at the time, but also through his biography of Mahmud II and his articles on Mahmud's legislative reforms for the legal journal, Gazette des tribunaux. He held salons at his apartment in the Rue de Navarin, attended by literary figures, artists, composers and journalists, all of whom were close friends. According to Xavier Eyma, who attended the salons at that time, they resembled a "miniature divan in Constantinople", with Turkish tobacco smoked on traditional Turkish pipes and Turkish coffee consumed in tiny cups. Amongst Royer's circle of friends at this time, in addition to Barbier and Vaëz, were Alphonse Karr, Camille Rogier (who travelled with Royer to Constantinople in 1840), Joseph Méry, Balzac, Gérard de Nerval, Théophile Gautier and Heinrich Heine. Heine, Gautier and Royer had a particularly close friendship. At several points they all lived near each other on the Rue de Navarin, at times sharing the same lodging. Royer and Gautier and their mistresses were also frequent visitors to Heine's summer house in Montmorency. In 1841, Gautier and Royer were Heine's seconds in his duel with Salomon Strauss which had involved them in lengthy negotiations with Strauss over the time, place and weapons. They were also the witnesses at Heine's marriage to his long-time mistress, Mathilde, which took place a week before the duel.

=== Theatre manager ===
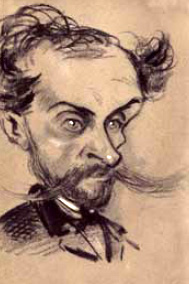
Alphonse Royer (caricature by Nadar ca. 1857)

Royer had been spoken of as a possible successor to Vedel, the director of Théâtre-Français, who resigned his post in 1840. In suggesting him for the directorship, La Presse wrote:

... M. Alphonse Royer, a man of taste, tact and charming demeanor. The government would find in him an experienced and skilful supporter and an enlightened defender of our great literary traditions.

In the end, Vedel was succeeded by François Buloz. However, in 1853 Royer was appointed director of the Théâtre de l'Odéon, where several of his plays had premiered in the 1840s. Vaëz joined him at the Odéon as a stage and artistic director and then went with him to the Paris Opéra in 1856 when Royer became the director there. During Royer's tenure, the Opéra produced the world premieres of operas by Giuseppe Verdi (Le trouvère, the French version of Il trovatore), Fromental Halévy (La Magicienne), Félicien David (Herculanum), Prince Poniatowski (Pierre de Médicis), and Charles Gounod (La reine de Saba) as well as ballets by Ernest Reyer (Sacountalâ), Daniel Auber (Marco Spada), and Jacques Offenbach (Le papillon).

Managing an opera house in Paris during the Second French Empire often meant managing the audience as well. On one notable occasion, Royer did not succeed. Napoleon III had ordered a performance of Wagner's Tannhäuser at the Opéra which was to be its French premiere. Royer told the composer that for the opera to have any success with Parisian audiences, it required the customary ballet, specifically at the beginning of the second act. Royer explained that the influential members of the Jockey-Club de Paris (all of whom held season tickets) were primarily interested in watching their favourites in the corps de ballet. They usually dined during the first act of operas, only entered their boxes when the second act began to watch the ballet, and departed immediately afterwards. Wagner adamantly refused to add a ballet to the second act, but compromised by adding one to the first act. The result was the famous fiasco of the "Paris Tannhäuser". On its opening night in 1861, the Jockey Club members duly arrived at the beginning of Act 2 and caused an uproar of shouts, whistles and laughter. Wagner recalled that when the whistling began, Royer turned to him in complete resignation and said, "Ce sont les Jockeys; nous sommes perdus." ("It's the Jockeys; we're lost.") The two successive performances were even more seriously disrupted. Wagner never permitted another production in Paris. In his autobiography, Wagner described Royer in one of their early encounters:

On one of these occasions Bulow accompanied me, and we were both struck by a ridiculous habit peculiar to this singular old man, whom Belloni said he had known in his youth as a box-office clerk at the Scala Theatre in Milan. He suffered from involuntary spasmodic movements of the hands, the result of certain not very creditable physical infirmities, and probably to conceal these he continually toyed with a small stick, which he tossed to and fro with seeming affectation.

=== Later years ===
Père Lachaise Cemetery with Paris in the distance

Royer remained director of the Paris Opéra until Vaëz's death in 1862, after which he left to become France's Inspecteur Général des Beaux-Arts (Inspector General for the Fine Arts). In his later years, he devoted himself to writing a six volume history of the theatre (the last two volumes of which were published posthumously) and a history of the Paris Opéra. He also translated the collected theatrical works of the Italian dramatist Carlo Gozzi, as well those of the Spanish writers, Miguel de Cervantes, Tirso de Molina, and Juan Ruiz de Alarcón. Royer's 1865 Théâtre d'Alarcón was the first time any of Alarcón's plays had been published in French translation. He had been made a Chevalier of the Légion d'honneur in 1844, and in 1867 was promoted to Officier.

Alphonse Royer died of pneumonia in Paris on 11 April 1875 at the age of 71. His funeral took place at the Église de la Sainte-Trinité, followed by burial in Père Lachaise Cemetery. Jean-Baptiste Faure sang the Pie Jesu during the Requiem Mass, and there were spoken tributes by Olivier Halanzier, director of the Paris Opéra, Ferdinand Dugne of the Société des auteurs dramatiques, and Emmanuel Gonzalès of the Société des gens de lettres. Halanzier's address at the graveside emphasized Royer's personal modesty and kindness and his contribution to opera and to the Paris Opéra in particular, concluding with:

This is why his memory will live on with us. This is why his memory will be always dear to the Opéra. Finally, gentlemen, why all of you share my words, my regrets, my tears!

Little has been written about Royer's personal life, although Fritz H. Eisner in his analysis of four letters by Heinrich Heine, describes one of them (circa 1843) as "written to Dolores Royer, the wife of Heine's friend Alphonse Royer". Royer's death was announced by his executor, Charles Narrey, and his nephew, Edmond Turquet, who led the mourners at his funeral.

== Principal works ==
Rosine Stoltz and Gilbert Duprez in the premiere of La favorite, Paris 1840

In addition to the works listed here, Royer was a regular contributor of articles, literary and music criticism, and serialized fiction (romans feuilleton) to several French periodicals, including L'Europe littéraire, Revue de Paris, Le Figaro, Le Ménestrel, Revue des Deux Mondes, and L'Artiste.

=== Opera librettos ===
The date and theatre given for a translated libretto is the date of the first performance using that translation.

- Lucie de Lammermoor (Donizetti) – French translation and adaptation (with Gustave Vaëz), Théâtre de la Renaissance, Paris 1839
- La favorite (Donizetti) – Original libretto (with Gustave Vaëz and Eugène Scribe), Paris Opéra (Salle Le Peletier), 1840
- Don Pasquale (Donizetti) – French translation (with Gustave Vaëz), Théâtre Royal de la Monnaie, Brussels 1843
- Otello (Rossini) – French translation (with Gustave Vaëz), Paris Opéra (Salle Le Peletier), 1844
- Robert Bruce (Rossini and Niedermeyer, pastiche opera) – Original libretto (with Gustave Vaëz), Paris Opéra (Salle Le Peletier), 1846
- Les premiers pas (Adam, Auber, Carafa, and Halévy) – Original libretto (with Gustave Vaëz), Opéra-National (Cirque Olympique), Paris 1847
- Jérusalem (Verdi) – Original libretto (with Gustave Vaëz), Paris Opéra (Salle Le Peletier), 1847
- Georgette ou Le moulin de Fontenoy (Gevaert) – Original libretto (with Gustave Vaëz), Théâtre Lyrique, Paris 1853
- Alessandro Stradella (Flotow) – French translation (with Gustave Oppelt), Théâtre Royal de la Monnaie, Brussels 1859

=== Plays ===
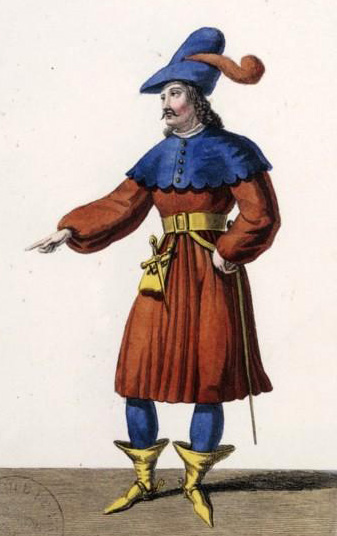
Charles Volnys as Henry in Royer's first play, Henry V et ses compagnons

- Henry V et ses compagnons (with Auguste Romieu), Théâtre des Nouveautés, Paris 1830
- Le Voyage à Pontoise (with Gustave Vaëz), Théâtre de l'Odéon, Paris 1842
- Le Bourgeois grand seigneur (with Gustave Vaëz), Théâtre de l'Odéon, Paris 1842
- Mademoiselle Rose (with Gustave Vaëz), Théâtre de l'Odéon, Paris 1843
- La Comtesse d'Altenberg (with Gustave Vaëz), Théâtre de l'Odéon, Paris 1843
- La Dame de trèfle (with Gustave Vaëz and Charles Narrey) Théâtre du Vaudeville, Paris 1850
- Les Fantaisies de Milord, (with Gustave Vaëz and Charles Narrey), Théâtre des Variétés, Paris 1850
- Le Jour et la nuit, (with Gustave Vaëz), Théâtre des Variétés, Paris 1850
- Un ami malheureux, (with Gustave Vaëz) Théâtre du Vaudeville, Paris 1850
- Chodruc-Duclos, ou l'Homme à la longue barbe, (with Gustave Vaëz and Michel Delaporte), Théâtre de la Gaîté, Paris 1850
- Déménagé d'hier, (with Gustave Vaëz and Charles Narrey), Théâtre des Variétés, Paris 1852
- Grandeur et décadence de M. Joseph Prudhomme, (with Henri Monnier), Théâtre de l'Odéon, Paris 1852

=== Novels ===
- Les Mauvais Garçons (with Henri Auguste Barbier), Paris: Eugène Renduel, 1830
- Venezia la bella, Paris: Eugène Renduel, 1834
- Un Divan (collection of novellas), Paris: Abel Ledoux, 1834
- Manoël, Paris: Abel Ledoux, 1834
- L'Auberge des trois pins (with Roger de Beauvoir), Paris: Dumont, 1836
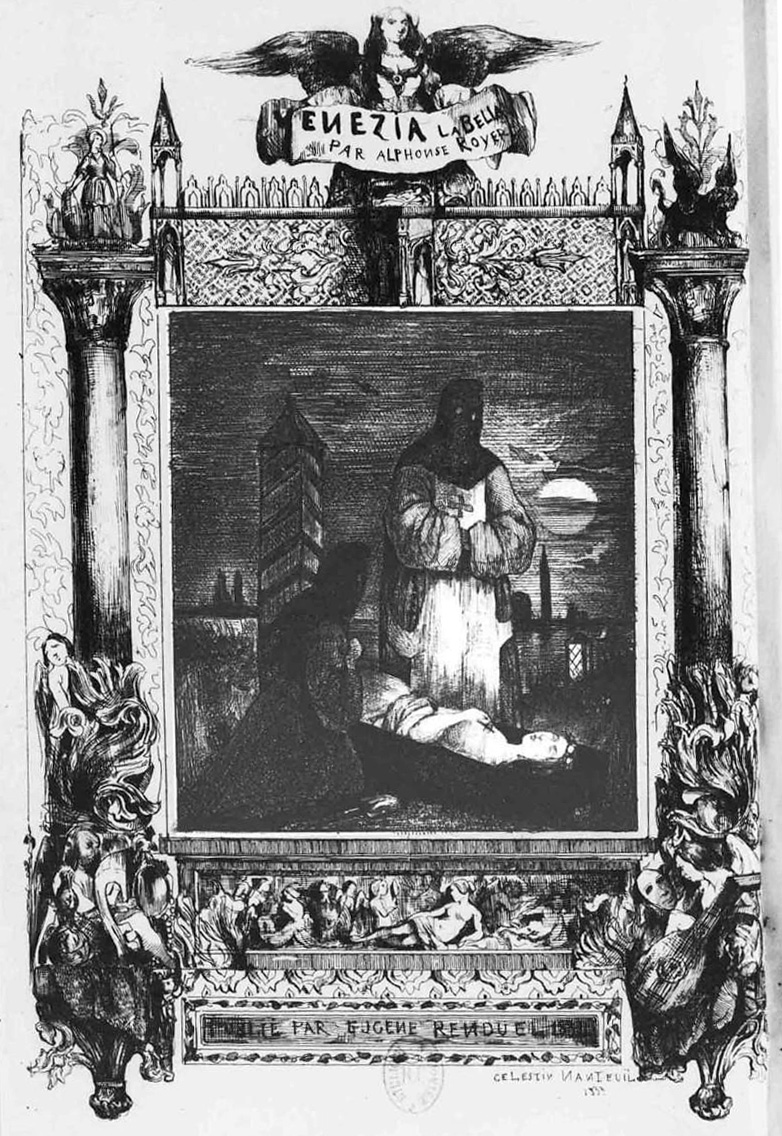
  Frontispiece by Nanteuil for Royer's novel, Venezia la bella
- Le Connétable de Bourbon, Paris: Werdet, 1838
- Robert Macaire en Orient, Paris: Dumont, 1840
- Mademoiselle Béata, Paris: Dumont, 1840
- Les Janissaires, Paris: Duval, 1844

=== Non-fiction ===
- Aventures de voyage, tableaux, récits et souvenirs du Levant, Paris: Dumont, 1837
- Histoire universelle du théâtre, Paris: A. Franck, 1869
- Histoire de l'Opéra, Paris: Bachelin-Deflorenne, 1875

=== Literary translations ===
- Théâtre de Miguel de Cervantes, Paris: Michel Lévy frères, 1862
- Théâtre de Tirso de Molina, Paris: Michel Lévy frères, 1863
- Théâtre d' Alarcón, Paris: Michel Lévy frères, 1865
- Théâtre fiabesque de Carlo Gozzi, Paris: Michel Lévy frères, 1865

== Notes and references ==
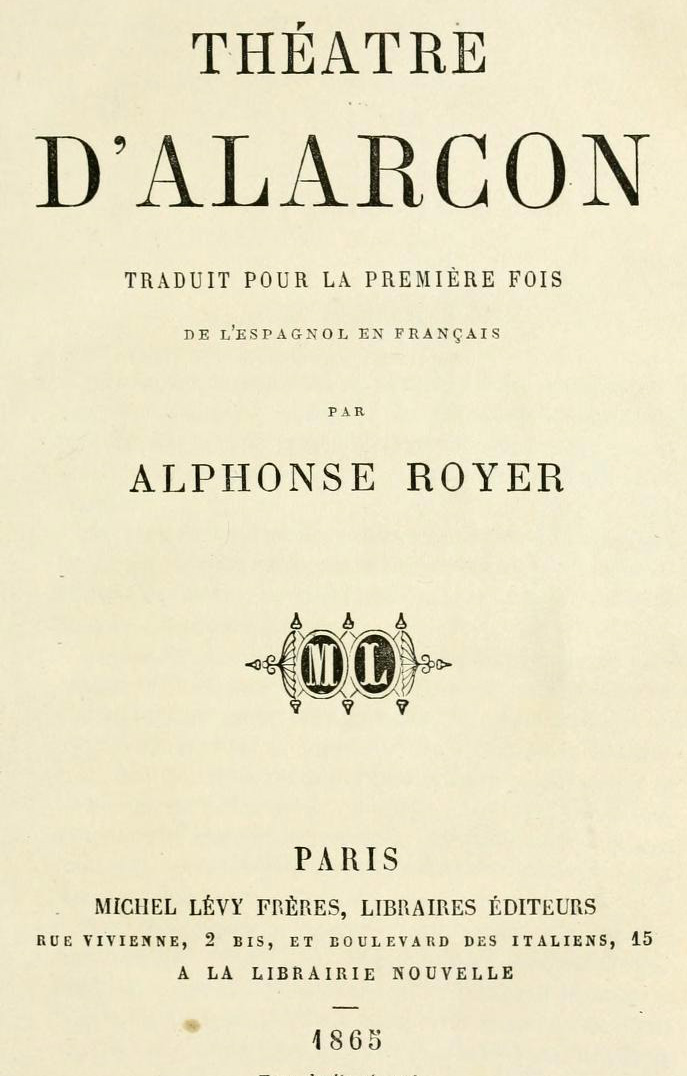
Royer's Théâtre d'Alarcón (1st edition title page)

== Sources ==
- Ashbrook, William, Donizetti and His Operas, Cambridge University Press, 1983, pp. 591–592. ISBN 0-521-27663-2
- Casaglia, Gherardo (2005). "Alphonse Royer". L'Almanacco di Gherardo Casaglia (in Italian).
- Claveau, Anatole "Chronique littéraire", Revue contemporaine, 1867 (in French)
- Douhair, P. "Revue Critique", Le Correspondant, Volume 64, 1865 (in French)
- Duval, Georges, L'Année théatral, Paris: Tresse, 1876 (in French)
- Eisner, Fritz H., "Four Heine Letters", The Leo Baeck Institute Yearbook, Volume 6, Number 1, January 1961, pp. 280–284
- Everist, Mark, "Partners in Rhyme: Alphonse Royer, Gustave Vaëz, and foreign opera in Paris during the July Monarchy" in Roberta Montemorra Marvin and Hilary Poriss (eds.), Fashions and Legacies of Nineteenth-Century Italian Opera, Cambridge University Press, 2009, pp. 30–52. ISBN 0-521-88998-7
- Eyma, Xavier, "Causerie", Le Moniteur de la mode, July 1866, pp. 218–220 (in French)
- Fejtő, François, Henri Heine, Maréchal, 1946 (in French)
- Gautier, Théophile, Correspondance générale, Volume 1 edited by Claudine Lacoste-Veysseyre, Librairie Droz, 1985 (in French)
- Holub, Robert C., "Heinrich Heine" in German Writers in the Age of Goethe, 1789–1832 (Dictionary of Literary Biography, Vol. 90), Gale, 1989, pp. 145–156
- La Presse, "Novelles et faits divers", 2 January 1840, p. 2 (in French)
- La Presse, "Courrier des théâtres", 13 April 1875, p. 2 (in French)
- La Presse, "Courrier des théâtres", 15 April 1875, p. 3 (in French)
- Le Ménestrel, "Semaine théâtrale et musicale", 18 April 1875) pp. 155–156 (in French)
- Norton, Leslie, Léonide Massine and the 20th Century Ballet, McFarland, 2004. ISBN 0-7864-1752-8
- Royer, Alphonse, Théâtre d'Alarcón, Michel Lévy frères, 1865 (in French)
- Sadie, Stanley (ed.), The New Grove Dictionary of Opera, Vol. 4, Oxford University Press, 1992, p. 76. ISBN 978-0-19-522186-2
- Schreier, Lise, Seul dans l'orient lointain: Les voyages de Nerval et Du Camp, Université de Saint-Etienne, 2006. ISBN 2-86272-427-0 (in French)
- Tajan, Catalogue: Nadar et son Panthéon, 3 December 2004, p. 90 (accessed 15 June 2010, in French)
- Théâtre de l'Odéon, Complete repertoire: 1782–1997 (accessed 15 June 2010)
- Vaëz, Gustave, "Alphonse Royer", in Louis Huart and Charles Philipon (eds.), Galerie de la presse, de la littérature et des beaux-arts, Volume 2, Au Bureau de la Publication, et Chez Aubert, 1840 (in French)
- Vapereau, Gustave (ed.), "Royer, Alphonse", Dictionnaire universel des contemporains: contenant toutes les personnes notables de la France et des pays étrangers, 5th Edition, Hachette, 1880, p. 1588 (in French)
- Wagner, Richard, My Life, Volume 2, Dodd, Mead and Company, 1911.
