= Marcello Giordani =

Italian operatic tenor (1963–2019)

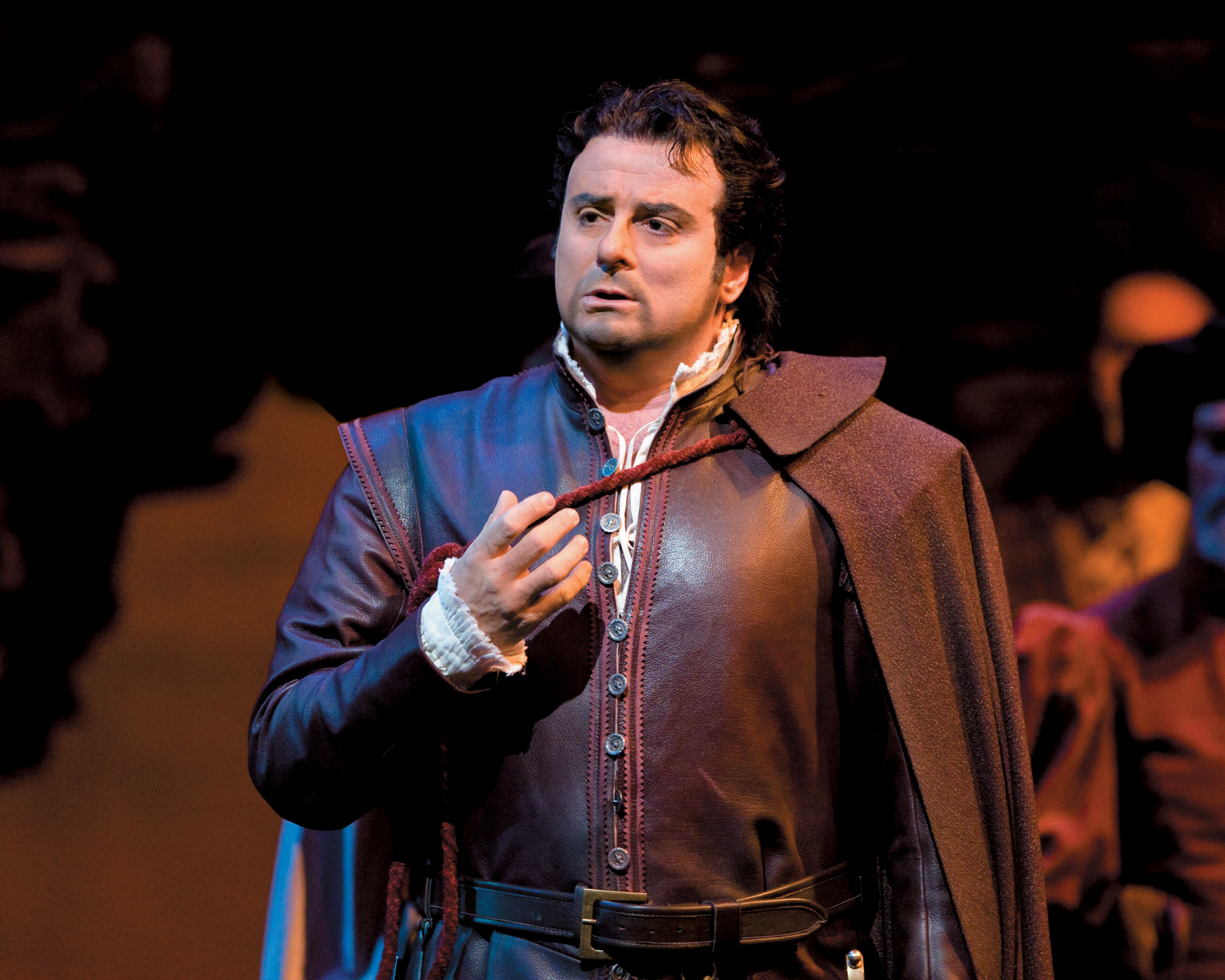
- Giordani as Verdi's Ernani
- Born: Marcello Guagliardo; 25 January 1963; Augusta, Italy
- Died: 5 October 2019 (aged 56); Augusta, Italy
- Occupation: Operatic tenor
- Organizations: Metropolitan Opera; Marcello Giordani Foundation

Marcello Giordani (born Marcello Guagliardo; 25 January 1963 – 5 October 2019) was an Italian operatic tenor who sang leading roles of the Italian and French repertoire in opera houses throughout Europe and the United States. He had a distinguished association with the New York Metropolitan Opera, where he sang in over 240 performances from the time of his debut there in 1993. He founded the Marcello Giordani Foundation to help young opera singers.

== Biography ==
Giordani was born on 25 January 1963 in the small town of Augusta, Sicily. His father, a former prison guard, was the owner of a major gasoline station in the town, and his mother was a housewife. He showed a talent for singing at an early age and took private lessons in Augusta as well as singing in a church choir. When he was nineteen, he quit his job at a bank. He studied voice first in Catania and from 1983 in Milan with Nino Carta. Giordani made his professional operatic debut in 1986 as the Duke in Rigoletto at the Festival dei Due Mondi in Spoleto. His debut at La Scala came two years later when he sang Rodolfo in La bohème. He went on to sing throughout Italy and Europe, and in 1988, he made his American debut singing Nadir in Les pêcheurs de perles with Portland Opera, a company with which he frequently appeared early in his career. Engagements with several other American opera companies followed, including San Francisco Opera, Seattle Opera, Los Angeles Opera and the Opera Company of Philadelphia. He performed at the Vienna State Opera first in 1992 as Sänger in Der Rosenkavalier by Richard Strauss, and appeared there in 14 roles in 72 performances. Giordani made his Metropolitan Opera debut in 1993 as Nemorino in a Parks performance of L'elisir d'amore opposite Maria Spacagna as Adina. His first performance on the actual stage at the Metropolitan Opera House was on 11 December 1995 as Rodolfo to Hei-Kyung Hong's Mimì with Carlo Rizzi conducting.

In 1994, vocal problems that had begun to surface in the previous years became more acute. He began to retrain his voice with Bill Schuman in New York but did not cancel his engagements. In 1995 he sang Alfredo in La traviata at Covent Garden under Sir Georg Solti, whose guidance he credited as a great help in the rebuilding of his career. In 1997, Giordani again sang at Covent Garden under Solti (as Gabriele Adorno in Simon Boccanegra), in what turned out to be the final opera performances that Solti would ever conduct. His career at the Met, which had initially been sporadic, began to flourish. He sang over 240 performances with the company, in 27 roles, including the leading tenor roles in the Met's premieres of Benvenuto Cellini and Il pirata. He also sang in the Met's season opening performances in both 2006 (Pinkerton in Madama Butterfly) and 2007 (Edgardo in Lucia di Lammermoor), and on 18 September 2008, he was the tenor soloist in the Met's performance of Verdi's Requiem in memory of Luciano Pavarotti. A reviewer for The New York Times wrote that he sang Pinkerton "with full-bodied Italianate passion; warm, rich tone; and clarion top notes".

Amongst the other opera houses and festivals where Giordani performed during his career were the Opernhaus Zürich, Vienna State Opera, Opéra National de Paris, Gran Teatre del Liceu in Barcelona, Deutsche Oper Berlin, Houston Grand Opera, Maggio Musicale Fiorentino, Teatro dell'Opera di Roma, Teatro Regio di Parma, Teatro Regio di Torino, Teatro Massimo Bellini di Catania, Arena di Verona, the Verbier Festival, and the Festival Puccini in Torre del Lago. In August 2008, Giordani appeared in concert with Salvatore Licitra and Ramón Vargas in Beijing's Great Hall of the People during the first week of the 2008 Olympic Games. 2008 also saw his appointment as artistic director for Musical Events at Città della Notte, a new arts center near Augusta. In December 2008 he gave his first master classes there.

In 2010, Giordani created the Marcello Giordani Foundation to help young opera singers at the beginning of their careers. The first annual Marcello Giordani Vocal Competition was held in Sicily in 2011.

Giordani met his wife, Wilma, when he was singing in Lucerne in 1988. They married two years later. The couple and their two sons lived in New York and Sicily. Giordani died of a heart attack at his home in Augusta on 5 October 2019 at the age of 56.

== Operatic repertoire ==
- Vincenzo Bellini
  - Il pirata (Gualtiero)
  - I puritani (Arturo)
  - La straniera (Arturo)
- Hector Berlioz
  - Benvenuto Cellini (Cellini)
  - La damnation de Faust (Faust)
  - Les Troyens (Énée)
  - Requiem
- Georges Bizet
  - Carmen (Don Jose)
  - Les pêcheurs de perles (Nadir)
- Francesco Cilea
  - Adriana Lecouvreur (Maurizio)
- Gaetano Donizetti
  - La favorite (Fernand)
  - La fille du régiment (Tonio)
  - Lucia di Lammermoor (Edgardo)
  - Lucrezia Borgia (Gennaro)
  - L'elisir d'amore (Nemorino)
- Umberto Giordano
  - Andrea Chénier (Chenier)
- Charles Gounod
  - Faust (Faust)
  - Roméo et Juliette (Romeo)
- Jules Massenet
  - Manon (Des Grieux)
  - Werther (Werther)
- Giacomo Meyerbeer
  - Les Huguenots (Raoul)
- Jacques Offenbach
  - Les contes d'Hoffmann (Hoffmann)
- Amilcare Ponchielli
  - La Gioconda (Enzo)
- Giacomo Puccini
  - Edgar (Edgar)
  - La bohème (Rodolfo)
  - La fanciulla del West (Dick Johnson)
  - Madama Butterfly (Pinkerton)
  - Manon Lescaut (Des Grieux)
  - Tosca (Mario Cavaradossi)
  - Turandot (Calaf)
- Gioachino Rossini
  - Guillaume Tell (Arnold)
- Richard Strauss
  - Der Rosenkavalier (Italian singer)
- Pyotr Ilyich Tchaikovsky
  - Eugene Onegin (Lensky)
- Giuseppe Verdi
  - Attila (Foresto)
  - Don Carlo (Don Carlo)
  - I vespri siciliani (Arrigo)
  - Il trovatore (Manrico)
  - La forza del destino (Alvaro)
  - La traviata (Alfredo)
  - Les vêpres siciliennes (Henri)
  - Luisa Miller (Rodolfo)
  - Requiem
  - Rigoletto (The Duke)
  - Simon Boccanegra (Gabriele Adorno)
  - Un ballo in maschera (Riccardo)
  - Ernani (Ernani)
- Riccardo Zandonai
  - Francesca da Rimini (Paolo Malatesta)

== Discography ==
Giordano made DVD recordings of complete operas, and recorded tenor recitals on CD, including:

- La bohème (Cristina Gallardo-Domâs, Elena Mosuc, Marcello Giordani, Michael Volle, Cheyne Davidson, László Polgár; Opernhaus Zürich Orchestra and Chorus; Franz Welser-Möst, conductor). Label: EMI Classics (DVD)
- La Gioconda (Lucia Mazzaria, Marcello Giordani, Alberto Mastromarino, Julia Gertseva, Lidia Tirendi, Michael Ryssov, Andrea Cortese, Valerio Saggi; Teatro Massimo Bellini di Catania Orchestra, Chorus, and Corps de Ballet; Donato Renzetti, conductor). Label: Kikko Classics (DVD)
- Madama Butterfly (Fiorenza Cedolins, Francesca Franci, Marcello Giordani, Juan Pons, Carlo Bosi; Arena di Verona Orchestra and Chorus; Daniel Oren, conductor). Label: TDK (DVD)
- Manon Lescaut (Karita Mattila, Marcello Giordani, Dwayne Croft, Dale Travis; Metropolitan Opera Orchestra and Chorus; James Levine, conductor). Label: EMI Classics (DVD)
- Steven Mercurio: Many Voices (Andrea Bocelli, Marcello Giordani, Rolando Villazón, Sumi Jo, and Gino Quilico; Prague Philharmonic Orchestra; Steven Mercurio, conductor). Label: Sony/BMG (CD)
- A Midsummer Night's Dream – Soundtrack (Marcello Giordani, Cecilia Bartoli, Renée Fleming, Roberto Alagna) Label: Decca (CD)
- Sicilia Bella (Marcello Giordani, tenor; Teatro Massimo Bellini di Catania Orchestra; Steven Mercurio, conductor). Label: VAI (CD)
- Tenor Arias (Marcello Giordani, tenor; Teatro Massimo Bellini di Catania Orchestra; Steven Mercurio, conductor). Label: Naxos (CD)
- Verdi: Jérusalem (Marcello Giordani, Roberto Scandiuzzi, Marina Mescheriakova; Orchestre de la Suisse Romande; Fabio Luisi, conductor). Label: Universal/Philips (CD)
- Viva Verdi A 100th Anniversary Celebration (Compilation – various artists). Label: Decca (CD)
