= Adolphe-Joseph-Louis Alizard =

French baritone

Adolphe-Louis-Joseph Alizard
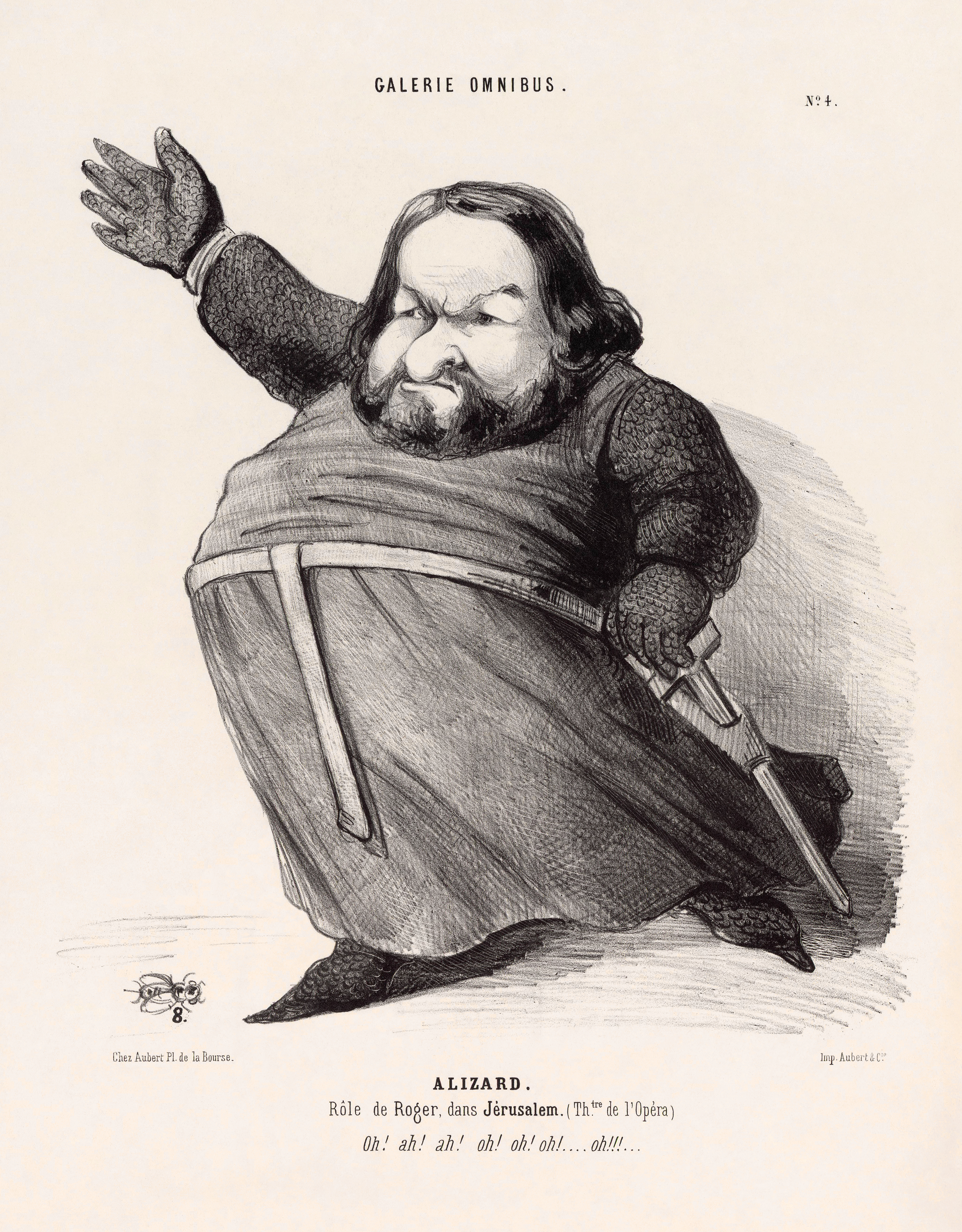
- Caricature of Adolphe-Joseph-Louis Alizard in the role of Roger in Verdi's Jérusalem at the Paris Opera

Background information
- Born: 29 December 1814; Paris, France
- Died: 23 January 1850 (aged 35) Marseille, France

Adolphe-Joseph-Louis Alizard (29 December 1814 – 23 January 1850) was a French bass-baritone.

He was born in Paris. He began his musical career as a pupil of Chrétien Urhan on the violin; but his master accidentally discovered that he had a remarkably fine voice and persuaded him to abandon his instrument and enter the Paris Conservatoire as a pupil of David Banderali. His voice was naturally a deep bass, but finding that after singing at the opera in Paris for five years he was still employed in secondary parts, he entered upon a diligent course of practice, by which he gained several notes in the upper register, and was able to take baritone parts. The strain upon his chest however was too great to be maintained without injury, and after several attacks, he died of tuberculosis at Marseille at the age of 35.

== Repertoire (incomplete) ==
- Giacomo Meyerbeer, Les Huguenots (le Comte de Saint-Bris)
- Giuseppe Verdi, Jérusalem (Roger)
