= Georges Jouatte =

French opera singer

Georges Jouatte (17 June 1892 – 13 February 1969) was a 20th-century French operatic singer (tenor) and singing professor.

== Biography ==
Jouatte was born in Villefagnan (Charente). Just after World War I, he began his career as a dancer at the Casino de Paris in order to finance his singing studies at the Conservatoire de Paris. To improve his skills, still a baritone at the time, he travelled to Germany in the 1920s.

It was there that in 1929 he played a small part in the first German-speaking feature film, Land Without Women (with Conrad Veidt). He was also active in Berlin, at the concert and as an operetta singer.

Returning to Paris, he performed on stage in 1932 at the Théâtre Mogador. After a conversion to the tenor register thanks to the advice of Paul Cabanel and Louis Fourestier in 1934, he made his debut at the Opéra Garnier in Faust by Charles Gounod.

He had a great success in 1936 in Der Rosenkavalier by Richard Strauss, played in the presence of the composer. His other roles at the Paris Opera included, Florestan in Fidelio (which he sang 75 times during his career), Admète in Alceste by Gluck, Don Ottavio in Don Giovanni, Erik in Der Fliegende Holländer, Ulysse in Pénélope by Fauré and Armal in Gwendoline by Emmanuel Chabrier.

In 1937, he joined the troupe of the Opéra-Comique where he performed in Die Entführung aus dem Serail by Mozart and L'incoronazione di Poppea by Monteverdi. Then rare tours followed at the Salzburg Festival, in Vienna, Montreux, Rome, Cairo and Covent Garden in London. His legacy, in addition to aria recordings, includes the first two complete recordings of Berlioz' La Damnation de Faust, the 1942 studio recording and the 1948 broadcast recording. Additionally he is the tenor in Fournet's 1943-1944 recording of Berlioz' Grande messe des morts. He was the Énée in a November 22, 1951 abridged broadcast of Les Troyens.

After the war, he withdrew from the stage and devoted himself to teaching, developing his reputation at the Conservatoire de Paris, from 1949 to 1962. His main students were Régine Crespin, Alain Fondary, Mady Mesplé and Roger Soyer.

After his retirement, he settled on the Atlantic coast back in Charente-Maritime where he died seven years later, in Île de Ré.

== Honours ==
In 1953, Georges Jouatte received the title of Chevalier of the Order of the Legion of Honour.
