= Carlo Colombara =

Italian operatic bass (born 1964)

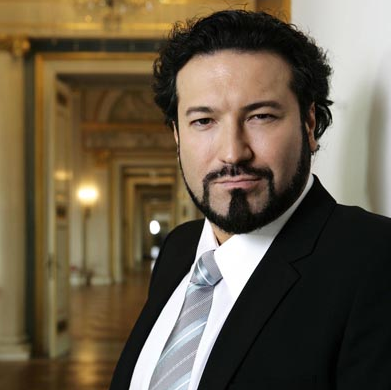
- Born: 7 August 1964; Bologna, Italy
- Occupation: Operatic bass

Carlo Colombara (born 7 August 1964) is an Italian operatic bass. He has sung leading roles in major opera houses including La Scala in Milan, the Vienna State Opera; the Real Teatro di San Carlo in Naples, the Arena di Verona, the Royal Opera House in London, and the Metropolitan Opera in New York City.

== Biography ==
Colombara was born in Bologna in 1964. He began his training at age twelve with piano lessons and began singing from age fifteen, studying with Paride Venturi in Bologna. In 1986, he won the prize for the best Italian singer in the G.B. Viotti competition and the following year, he won the As.Li.Co. competition in Milan.

He then made his professional début as Silva in Giuseppe Verdi's Ernani at the Teatro dell'Opera di Roma (Rome, Italy). With Zubin Mehta conducting, he performed in an open-air production of Giacomo Puccini's Turandot in the Forbidden City, (Beijing, China), which was recorded and broadcast worldwide.

He has sung in the most important theaters in the world: Wiener Staatsoper, Metropolitan Opera of New York City, Teatro Colón de Buenos Aires, Opéra Bastille in Paris, Covent Garden in London, Arena di Verona, Maggio Musicale Fiorentino and many others.

He collaborated with many important conductors: Riccardo Chailly, Myung-Whun Chung, Colin Davis, Gianandrea Gavazzeni, Carlo Maria Giulini, Eliahu Inbal, Lorin Maazel, Zubin Mehta, Riccardo Muti, Antonio Pappano, Michel Plasson, Georges Prêtre, Wolfgang Sawallisch, Philippe Auguin, Giuseppe Sinopoli, and Georg Solti.

In recent years, he débuted in the roles of Mefistofele of Arrigo Boito, Escamillo in Carmen, Don Pasquale, the four bass roles in Les contes d'Hoffmann and Don Giovanni. In 2012, he débuted in the role of Scarpia in Puccini's Tosca in Prague and Parma.

In 2013 Verdi's bicentenary, he interpreted the Messa da Requiem with the Boston Symphony Orchestra in Boston, at the Southbank Centre for the Royal Festival Hall in London and at the Savonlinna Opera Festival.

In 2014, he débuted in the new work of Kolonovits "El Juez" with José Carreras at the Teatro Arriaga in Bilbao. He also performed in Simon Boccanegra in Piacenza and Modena, and in celebrations of the great Bulgarian bass Boris Christoff at the Theatre of Sofia; in three productions (Aida, Nabucco, Don Carlo) and Verdi's Requiem under the direction of Antonio Pappano in Birmingham and London.

In 2015, he sang Aida, La Bohéme and Verdi's Messa da Requiem in Teatro alla Scala di Milano with Zubin Mehta, Aida in Arena di Verona, Maria Stuarda in Paris, Messa da Requiem in Gasteig, Munich and in Prague, and in the big concert in memory of Elena Obraztsova in the Bolshoi Theater in Moscow, the only Italian artist invited to sing.

In the 2016, season he sang in Rigoletto at La Scala in Milano, Oroveso in Norma at the Teatro San Carlo in Napoli and Aida in Moscow in a concert with Zubin Mehta, Nabucco, Macbeth in Brussels, Faust in Zagreb and the debut in Boris Godunov in Bulgaria.

In 2017, after the successes in Modena (Attila) in Montecarlo (Simon Boccanegra) and at the Teatro alla Scala in Milan (Anna Bolena and La Bohème) he was awarded in December 2017 with the International Opera Award - Oscar della Lirica as best bass of the year during an important tour in China.

In the year 2018 he is still protagonist at the Teatro alla Scala in Milan (Aida) then Don Giovanni at the Opera of Belgrade and at the Roman Opera of Craiova, the Count of Walter at the Staatsoper in Hamburg in Luisa Miller and the role of Raimondo in Lucia di Lammermoor at the Seoul Opera Art in Korea.

In addition to the operatic side, Colombara undertook an intense activity as a concert performer, performing many different times Verdi's Messa da Requiem in cities such as Florence, Rome, London, Naples, Paris and Modena − the latter in memory of Luciano Pavarotti, with whom he appeared in the last Requiem performed by Pavarotti.

== Prizes ==
- 1986: G.B.Viotti competition
- 1987: As. Li.Co competition
- 1994: Lauri Volpi competition
- 1995: Orazio Tosi competition
- 1999: Cappelli competition
- 2002: Matassa d’Oro
- 2009: Premio Monteverdi
- 2011: Premio Bonci d'Oro
- 2014: Premio Danzuso

== Discography ==
Colombara's discography includes recordings on compact disc (CD) and DVD for various labels.

It also includes broadcasts for radio (Radio France and Bayerischer Rundfunk (German radio), among others) and television from Teatro alla Scala, the Maggio Musicale Fiorentino and the Real Teatro di San Carlo.

=== CD ===
Recitals

- Daemons & Angels; Director Vladimir Ghiaurov, Bulgarian National Symphony Orchestra (Kicco Classic 2010)
- Opera Arias; Director G. Rath, Orchestra della Svizzera Italiana (Lugano, Switzerland) (Bongiovanni 2003)
- Musica proibita; Richard Barker, piano (Bongiovanni 2005)
- Rencontres - mélodies francaises; Rani Calderon, piano, Dynamic 2008)
- Colombara, Great Opera Scenes - Boemi/PO Graz, 2015, Decca

Operas

- Vincenzo Bellini; La sonnambula at the Opéra National de Lyon (Lyon, France); Director Evelino Pidò; with N. Dessay, F. Meli (Virgin Records 2007)
- Gaetano Donizetti; La favorite on Bayerischer Rundfunk (German radio); Director M. Viotti; with V. Kasarova, R. Vargas, A. Michaels-Moore (BMG 1999)
- Gaetano Donizetti; Lucia di Lammermoor at the Maggio Musicale Fiorentino; Director Z. Mehta; with M. Devia, J. Bros, R. Frontali (Foné 1998)
- Gaetano Donizetti; Lucia di Lammermoor; Director S. Ranzani; Tokyo Philharmonic Orchestra (Tokyo, Japan); with M. Devia, M. Alvarez, R. Bruson (La Voce 2005)
- Georg Friedrich Händel; Rinaldo at the Teatro La Fenice (Venice, Italy); Director J. Fischer; with M. Horne, C. Gasdia, E. Palacio (Nuova Era 1988)
- Amilcare Ponchielli; La Gioconda; Director D. Renzetti; with A. Gruber, M. Berti (Dynamic S.r.l. 2006)
- Giacomo Puccini; La bohème at the Teatro Comunale di Bologna (Bologna); Director G. Gelmetti; with D. Dessì, G. Sabbatini, P. Gavanelli (EMI 1991)
- Giacomo Puccini; Turandot; Director Z. Mehta; with G. Casolla, B. Frittoli, S. Larin (BMG 1997)
- Gioachino Rossini; Stabat Mater; Director P. Morandi; Hungarian State Symphony Orchestra (Budapest, Hungary) (Naxos Records 1998)
- Giuseppe Verdi; I masnadieri at the Festival Ludwigsburg; Director W. Gönnenwein; with M. Rowland, M. Malagnini, R. Bruson (Bayern Records)
- Giuseppe Verdi; Il trovatore at the Teatro Massimo Bellini (Catania, Sicily); Director S. Mercurio; with V. Villaroel, E. Zaremba, A. Bocelli, C. Guelfi (Decca Records 2004)
- Giuseppe Verdi; Requiem on Bayerischer Rundfunk; Director C. Davis; with C. Vaness, (RCA Records 1990)
- Giuseppe Verdi; Requiem; Conductor P. Morandi; Hungarian State Symphony Orchestra (Naxos Records 1996)
- Giuseppe Verdi; Requiem; Conductor Yuri Temirkanov; St. Petersburg Philharmonic Orchestra (Signum Classic 2009)
- Giuseppe Verdi; Requiem; Conductor Helmuth Rilling; Radio-Sinfonieorchester Stuttgart des SWR (Hänssler 2010)
- Giuseppe Verdi; Simon Boccanegra; Director G. Solti; with L. Nucci, K. Te Kanawa, J. Aragall (Decca Records 1989)
- Giuseppe Verdi; Simon Boccanegra; Director M. Zanetti; with Hampson, J. Calleja (Decca Records 2013)
- Giuseppe Verdi; Aida; Conductor Z. Mehta; with K.Lewis, A. Bocelli, (Decca Records 2016)
- Charles Gounod; Faust; Conductor Ville Matvejeff, Aljaz Farasin, Marijucca Tepponen, Lucio Gallo (Naxos 2019)
- Giuseppe Verdi; Attila; Conductor Aldo Sisillo; with Vladimir Stoyanov, Svetlana Kasyan, Sergio Escobar (Realsound 2021)

=== DVD ===
Recitals

- The art of the bass; Director V. Ghiaurov, G. Gyorivanyi-Rath, F. Milani (Naxos 2012)

(in composer order, then composition, then date)

- Gaetano Donizetti; Lucia di Lammermoor at the Teatro alla Scala; Director S. Ranzani; with M. Devia, R. Bruson (Fonit Cetra 1994)
- Gaetano Donizetti; Lucia di Lammermoorat the Bunkamura (Tokyo); Director S. Ranzani; with M. Devia, M. Alvarez, R. Bruson (La Voce 2005)
- Amilcare Ponchielli; La Gioconda at the Arena de Verona; Director D. Renzetti; with A. Gruber, M. Berti (Dynamic S.r.l. 2006)
- Amilcare Ponchielli; La Gioconda at the Gran Teatre del Liceu (Barcelona) (TDK 2006)
- Giacomo Puccini; Turandot; Director Z. Mehta; with Pechino, G. Casolla, B. Frittoli, S. Larin (BMG 1997)
- Giuseppe Verdi; Requiem; Director D. Oren; with L. Pavarotti (RAI Video 1996)
- Giuseppe Verdi; Aida; Director D. Licata; with G. Giacomini, A. Millo (RAI Video 1993)
- Giuseppe Verdi; Jérusalem; Director Michel Plasson (RAI Video 2000)
- Giuseppe Verdi; Macbeth at the Teatro alla Scala; Director Riccardo Muti (RAI Video 1998)
- Giuseppe Verdi; Nabucco at the Real Teatro di San Carlo; Director Paolo Carignani; with Renato Bruson (RAI Video 1996)
- Giuseppe Verdi; Nabucco at the Arena di Verona; Director D. Oren; with Maria Guleghina, Leo Nucci, F. Sartori (Decca Records 2007)
