= Gustave Vaëz =

Belgian playwright, librettist and translator of opera librettos

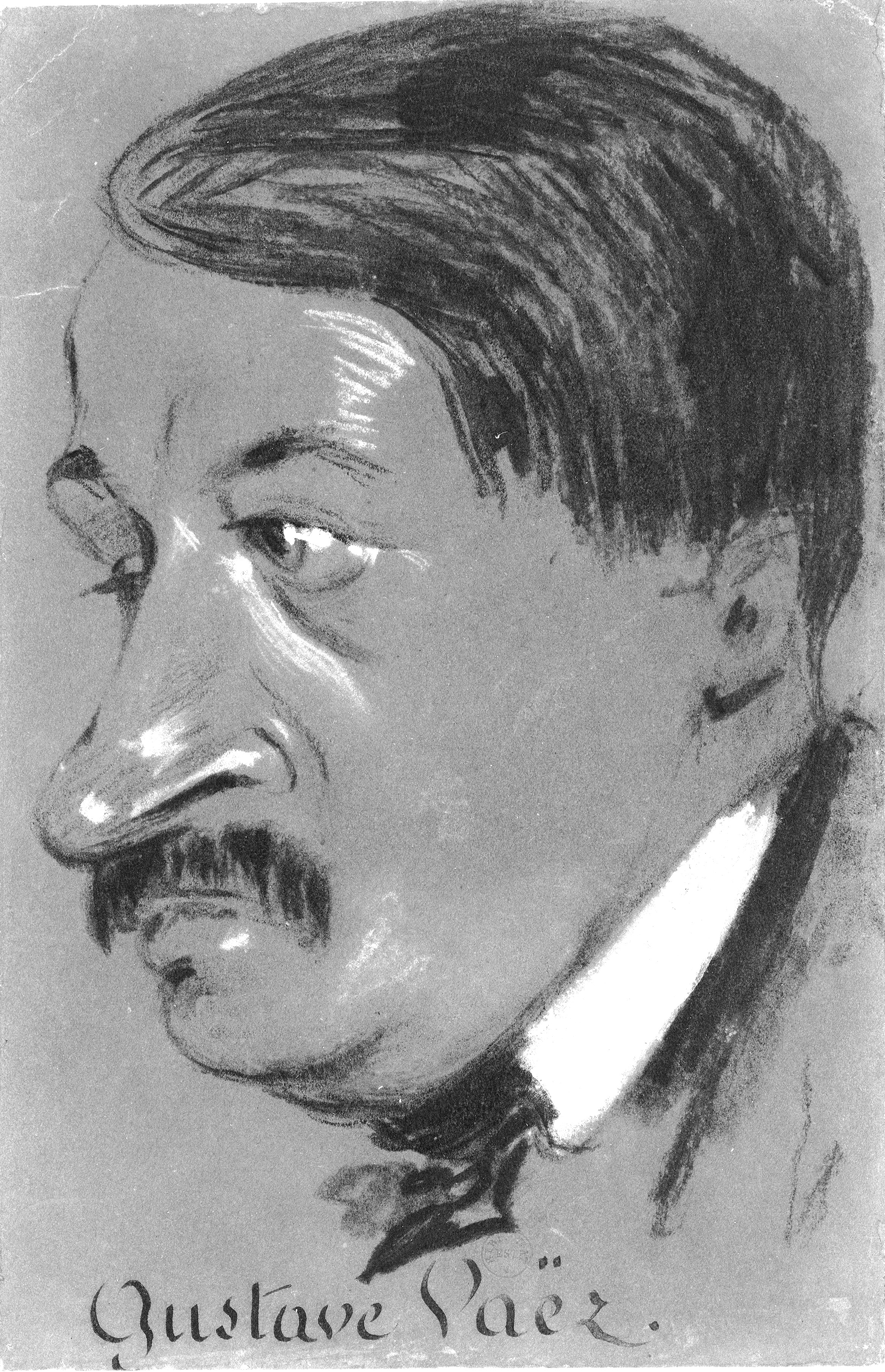
Caricature of Vaëz by Nadar (1850s)

Jean-Nicolas-Gustave Van Nieuwen-Huysen (known as Gustave Vaëz) (6 December 1812 – 12 March 1862) was a Belgian playwright, librettist, translator of opera libretti, and opera director. He wrote many stage plays and opera libretti in collaboration with Alphonse Royer; including the libretti to Gaetano Donizetti's La favorite (1843) and Giuseppe Verdi's Jérusalem (1847). Vaëz and Royer also translated several Italian-language operas by other writers into French. Vaëz also collaborated on opera libretti with the writers Eugène Scribe and Victorien Sardou.

Alone, Vaëz wrote the libretto to Donizetti's Rita, ou Le mari battu. He served as director of the Odéon-Théâtre de l'Europe from 1853 to 1856, and as deputy director of the Paris Opera from 1856 to 1860. He was awarded the Order of Leopold in 1846, and the Legion of Honour in 1856. He died in 1862.

== Life and career ==
Gustave Vaëz was born in Brussels on 6 December 1812. He studied law and earned a doctorate at the State University of Leuven. Since he had no desire to work as a lawyer, he devoted himself to a career as a playwright.

Vaëz published a large number of plays. His first plays were staged from 1829 to 1834 in Brussels, and were a success. He left for Paris to work with fellow dramatist Alphonse Royer. Together they co-authored 30 stage works that mainly consisted of opera libretti and a type of play known as comédies-vaudevilles. Their most successful work was the libretto for Gaetano Donizetti's La favorite (1843). They also co-authored the libretto to Giuseppe Verdi's Jérusalem (1847).

Vaëz and Royer also translated several libretti written in the Italian language by other authors into the French language. Operas which Vaëz and Royer co-translated included Donizetti's Lucia di Lammermoor (1839); Gioachino Rossini: Otello (1844); and Verdi's I Lombardi (1847).

Alone, Vaëz wrote the French language libretto for Donizetti's Rita, ou Le mari battu. With Eugène Scribe he co-authored two libretti for the composer D. F. X. Boisselot: Ne touchez pas à la reine (1847) and Mosquita la sorcière (1851). He also co-wrote the libretto for François-Auguste Gevaert's Le capitaine Henriot (1864) with Victorien Sardou.

Vaëz was awarded the Order of Leopold in 1846, and the Legion of Honour in 1856. In 1853 he was appointed director of the Odéon-Théâtre de l'Europe. He held that post until he was appointed deputy director of the Paris Opera in 1856; a post he held through 1860.

Gustave Vaëz died in Paris on 12 March 1862.

== Selected works ==
- Mon parrain de Pontoise: comédie-vaudeville en un acte (1842)
- Mademoiselle Rose: comédie en trois actes (1943)
- Othello: opéra en trois actes (1844)
- Robert Bruce: opéra en trois actes (1847)
- Ne touchez pas à la reine: opéra en trois actes (1847)
- Les fantaisies de milord: comédie-vaudeville en un acte (1850)
- La dame de trèfle: vaudeville en un acte (1850)
