= Alain Fondary =

French baritone (born 1932)

Alain Fondary (born 9 October 1932 in Bagnolet) is a French baritone.

== Biography ==
Before embarking on his lyrical career, Alain Fondary followed the family tradition of glass blower, like his parents, in Paris, Boulevard Voltaire. He attended glass school and went to opera with his parents and José Luccioni, a friend of the family. Passionate about judo, he nevertheless worked on singing at the age of thirty, first with André Baugé, then with Georges Jouatte and André Hauth, then with Yvonne Pons, Alice Monfort and Gaetano Abrani.

He made his debut in Cherbourg in Pagliacci by Ruggero Leoncavallo, performing the role of Tonio in 1968 and the following year sang Ourrias in Mireille by Charles Gounod in Toulouse. He created Les Boréades by Jean-Philippe Rameau, under the direction of Gardiner in London in 1980. His career accelerated in Bercy in 1984, when he replaced Piero Cappuccilli in Aida by Verdi, where he played Amonasro; he was then offered the biggest stages. The following year he sang at the Chorégies d'Orange, at Covent Garden, and La Scala. In 1987, he made his American debut in San Francisco in the role of Scarpia of Tosca by Giacomo Puccini and the following year at the MET in Cavalleria rusticana by Pietro Mascagni and Aida; later operas in which he sang in New York included La gioconda, Samson et Dalila, La fanciulla del west and Tosca. In Munich, he sang in Les Contes d'Hoffmann. In Paris, he sang in Thaïs by Jules Massenet and Rigoletto by Verdi. He appeared for the first time at the Easter festival of Salzburg in 1989 in Tosca alongside Luciano Pavarotti and under the direction of Karajan, and in Carmen in Paris. The following year he was asked to play at the Wiener Staatsoper; in 1992 he played Falstaff in Buenos Aires.

In March 2008, he played the role of Sultan Alaouddin in Padmâvatî by Albert Roussel, under the direction of Lawrence Foster, at the Théâtre du Châtelet.

His repertoire comprises more than thirty roles including Tosca, La Gioconda, Hérodiade, Henry VIII, Samson and Dalilah, Thaïs, Jérusalem, and the great verdian roles: Macbeth, Rigoletto, Don Carlos, Othello, Simon Boccanegra, Aida, Nabucco, Falstaff as well as Les Contes d'Hoffmann and la Grande Duchesse de Gerolstein.

He has also premiered works by Charles Chaynes, including Cecilia at Monte-Carlo in 2000, revived in Avignon in January 2005 and Mi amor in March 2007 in Metz.

== Discography ==
- Gounod, Roméo et Juliette - Alain Fondary: Capulet; Roberto Alagna, Romeo; Angela Gheorghiu, Juliette; Anne Constantin; José van Dam; Choirs and Orchestre national du Capitole de Toulouse, conductor Michel Plasson (October 1995, EMI) OCLC 815765146
- Landowski, Montségur - Karam Amstrong, soprano; Michel Sénéchal and Rémy Corazza, ténors; Gino Quillico, Pierre Thau and Alain Fondary, baritones; Chœurs et Orchestre de l'Opéra de Paris, dir. Michel Plasson (April 1987, Cybelia) OCLC 658978316
- [Massenet, Don Quichotte - Teresa Berganza (La belle Dulcinée); José Van Dam (Don Quichotte); Alain Fondary (Sancho Pança); Choirs and Orchestre du Capitole de Toulouse, dir. Michel Plasson (23-27 June 1992, EMI) OCLC 857975255
- Puccini, La fanciulla del West - Éva Marton, soprano; Dennis O'Neill and Walter Planté, tenors; Alain Fondary, baritone; Chœurs et orchestre de la radio bavaroise, dir. Leonard Slatkin (16-28 June 1991, RCA Victor Red Seal) OCLC 27723911
- Saint-Saëns, Samson and Delilah - Waltraud Meier, Plácido Domingo; Chœurs et Orchestre de l'Opéra Bastille, dir. Chung Myung-whun (1-11 July 1991, EMI 7 54470 2) OCLC 27966982

== Bibliography ==
- Pâris, Alain (2004). Dictionnaire des interprètes et de l'interprétation musicale. Bouquins (in French). Paris: Éditions Robert Laffont. p. 288. ISBN 2221080645. OCLC 901287624.
- Patrick Alliotte, Alain Fondary : la voix du souffleur, preface by Roberto Alagna. Lyon, éd. Symétrie 2011, 163 pages OCLC 762757159 Alain Fondary
