= Robert Bruce (opera) =

Opera by Gioachino Rossini

- Pastiche opera by: Gioachino Rossini and; Louis Niedermeyer
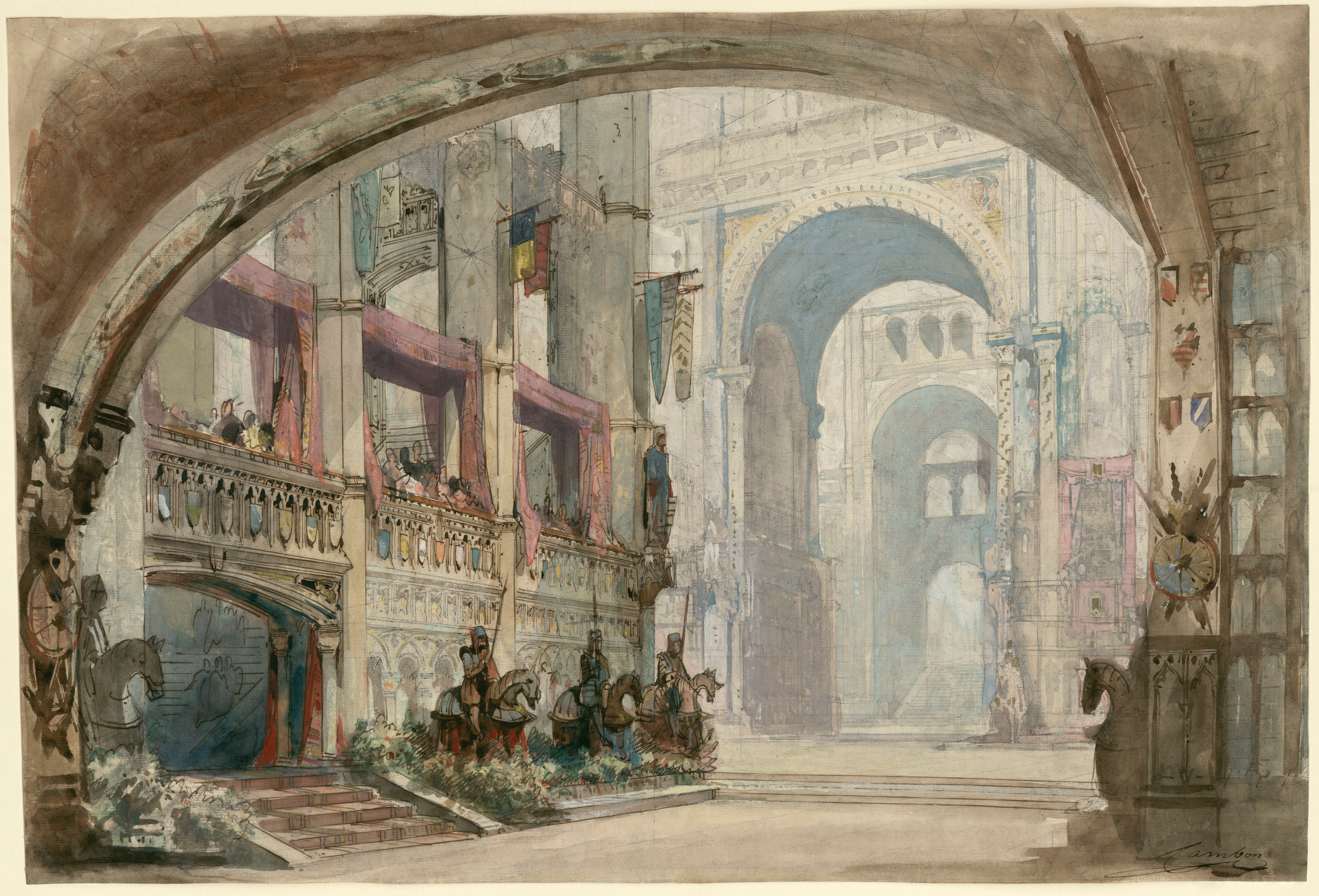
- Set design by Charles-Antoine Cambon for act 3, scene 3 in the première
- Librettist: Alphonse Royer; Gustave Vaëz
- Language: French
- Based on: History of Scotland by Walter Scott
- Premiere: 30 December 1846; Salle Le Peletier, Paris

Robert Bruce is an 1846 pastiche opera in three acts, with music by Gioachino Rossini and Louis Niedermeyer to a French-language libretto by Alphonse Royer and Gustave Vaëz. The plot concerns the defeat of the forces of Edward II of England by Robert the Bruce, King of Scots, and is adapted from Walter Scott's History of Scotland. The music was stitched together by Niedermeyer, with the composer's permission, with pieces from La donna del lago, Zelmira, and other Rossini operas. The work was premiered on 30 December 1846, by the Paris Opera at the Salle Le Peletier. (Note: Osborne 1986, p. 288. In his second edition (2007), Osborne gives the date of the premiere on p. 137 as 23 December and on p. 357 as 30 December. Weinstock 1968, p. 238 explains that the premiere was originally scheduled for 23 December, which is the date found in the printed libretto, but was postponed to 30 December because the lead mezzo-soprano, Rosine Stoltz, was ill. See also Le Ménestrel, vol. 14, no, 4 (27 December 1846).) The audience may not have noticed, but the orchestra included for the first time a recently invented instrument, which later came to be known as the saxophone.

== Background ==
After Rossini's arrival in Paris in 1843 for medical treatment, he was visited by Léon Pillet, the director of the Paris Opera. Pillet begged Rossini to compose a new work for the house. Rossini declined because of his poor health, but pointed out that his opera La donna del lago (1819), which he felt had never been performed adequately at the Théâtre Italien in Paris, would be "most suitable for the French stage, the one that more than the others, had need of your big choruses, your magnificent orchestra, your beautiful staging. ... Now that you have [Rosine] Stoltz at your disposal you would do well to profit by it." However, Pillet was reluctant to present a work which since 1824 in its Italian version was already well known to Parisian audiences.

Rossini went back to his home in Bologna, where in June 1846 he was again visited by Pillet, who was accompanied by librettist Gustave Vaëz, and Louis Niedermeyer. The result (which also involved Vaëz's regular collaborator Alphonse Royer as co-librettist) was Robert Bruce, an elaborate pasticcio, based on music not only from La donna del lago and Zelmira, but also from Bianca e Falliero, Torvaldo e Dorliska, Armida, Mosè in Egitto, and Maometto II. Niedermeyer apparently wrote the necessary recitatives.

== Premiere ==
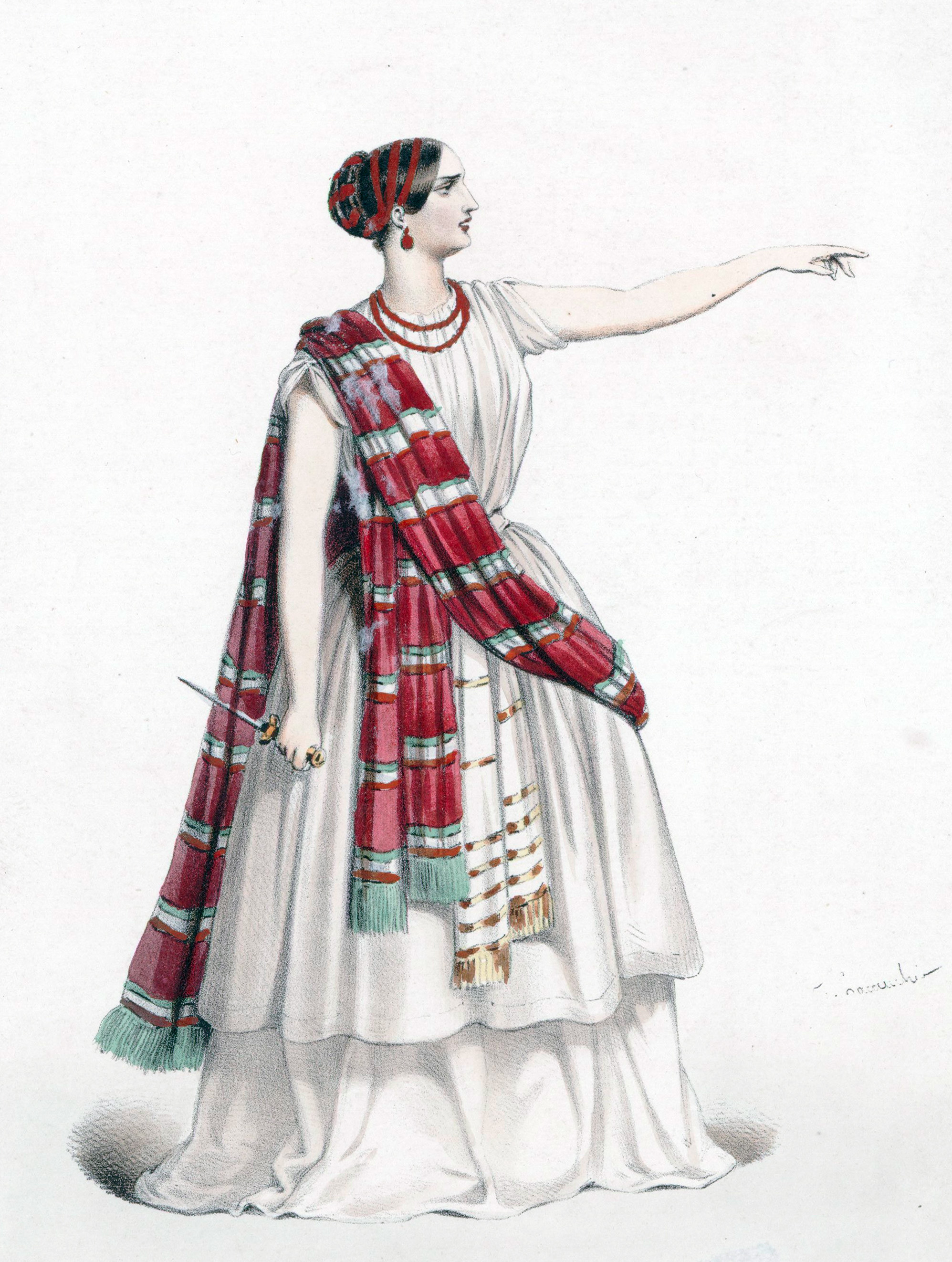
Rosine Stoltz as Marie

Rossini was clearly involved in the collaboration but did not attend the premiere in Paris. The production included a ballet with the dancers Lucien Petipa, Henri Desplaces, Adèle Dumilâtre, and Maria Jacob, and choreography by Joseph Mazilier. The décor was designed by Joseph Thierry (Act 1); Charles Cambon, Jules Diéterle, and Édouard Desplechin (Act 2); and René Philastre and Charles Cambon (Act 3). The costumes were designed by Paul Lormier. It was a moderate success, but the opera was the subject of much criticism from Hector Berlioz, among others.

== Roles ==
Roles, voice type, premiere cast
Role	Voice type	Premiere cast, 30 December 1846
Robert Bruce, King of Scotland	baritone	Paul Barroilhet
Édouard II, King of England	tenor	Louis Paulin
Douglas, Lord of Douglas	bass	Raffaele Anconi
Marie, his daughter	mezzo-soprano	Rosine Stoltz
Dickson, a highlander of Stirling	bass	Bessin
Nelly, his daughter	soprano	Maria Nau
Arthur, an official in the service of Édouard	tenor	Jérémie Bettini
Morton, an English captain	bass	Rommy
Édouard's page	musichetto	Moisson
A bard	bass	
English knights, soldiers and pages, ladies of the Court of England, Scottish bards, Bruce's knights and soldiers, gypsies, jugglers

== Recordings ==
Year	Cast (Robert Bruce, Marie, Nelly, Eduard II, Douglas)	Conductor, opera house and orchestra	Label
2002	Nicolas Rivenq, Iano Tamar, Inga Balabanova, Davide Cicchetti, Massimiliano Chiarolla	Paolo Arrivabene, Orchestra Internazionale d'Italia and the Bratislava Chamber Choir, (Recorded from a performance in the Palazzo Ducale, Martina Franca, as part of the Festival della Valle d'Itria)	Dynamic; Cat: CDS 421/1-2
