= David Banderali =

Italian opera singer

David Banderali (or Davidde; Palazzolo sull'Oglio, Italy, January 12, 1789 – Paris, 13 June 1849) was an Italian tenor, popular in France in the nineteenth century.

He was also professor of singing at the Conservatory of Milan and from 1828 until his death from cholera at the Paris Conservatoire.

== Biography ==
He received his musical education in Lodi. At 17, he attracted the attention of Princess Amalie Auguste of Bavaria, wife of Eugène de Beauharnais, Viceroy of Italy, and was appointed to their court. In 1812 he was summoned to Moscow by Napoleon, but the journey was interrupted and he returned to Milan.

His musical talent and his qualities as a singer won him the appointment of Master of Singing at the Milan Conservatory, where he had among his pupils Giuditta Pasta, Giovanni Battista Rubini, Fanny Eckerlin, Timoleon Alexander, Giulio Pellegrini, Adolphe-Joseph-Louis Alizard and Violante Camporesi.

In 1828 he was called to France by the Director of Fine Arts for the post of professor of singing at the Paris Conservatoire. His activities earned him the decoration of the Legion of Honour in 1842.
