= Charles Narrey =

French novelist and playwright (1825–1892)

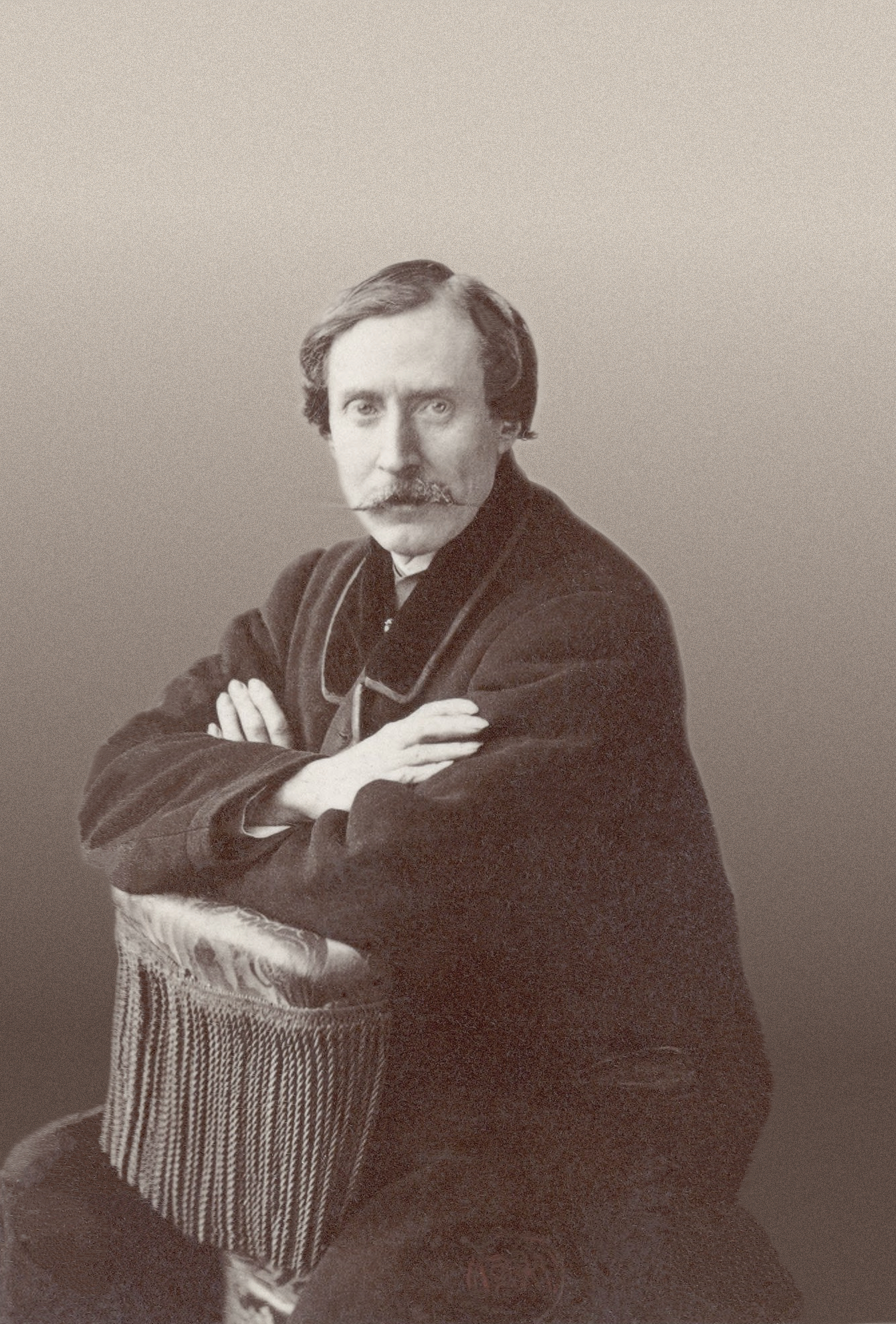
Charles Narrey (photo atelier Nadar)

Charles Narrey (1825 in Becques, Nord – 1892 in Paris) was a 19th-century French writer, including novelist and playwright, from an Irish family arrived in France following James II of England.

Narrey made his debut in 1847 with both a novel, Deux heures de mystères, and two comedies performed at the Théâtre de l'Odéon, Les Notables de l'endroit (in three acts) and En bonne fortune (in one act). From 1853 until 1856, he was one of the administrators of this theatre.

Narrey wrote a certain number of plays for different theatres, sometimes in collaboration with M. Michel: Le Passé et l'avenir (Odéon, 1847), Van Dyck à Londres (Odéon, 1848), Les Tribulations d'une actrice (Théâtre des Variétés, 1857), La Dame de trèfle, Les Fantaisies de Milord, Georges Brummel, La Femme à la broche, La Bohême d'argent, Le Moulin ténébreux, La Cigarette, Les Marionnettes de Justin, etc.

In addition, he also published Le Quatrième Larron in 1861, Ce que l'on dit pendant une contredanse (1863), Les Amours faciles (1866), Les Derniers Jeunes Gens, Le Bal du diable, etc.

His last work was a more humorous than philological fantasy entitled Voyage autour du dictionnaire published in 1892.
