= Verónica Villarroel =

Chilean soprano

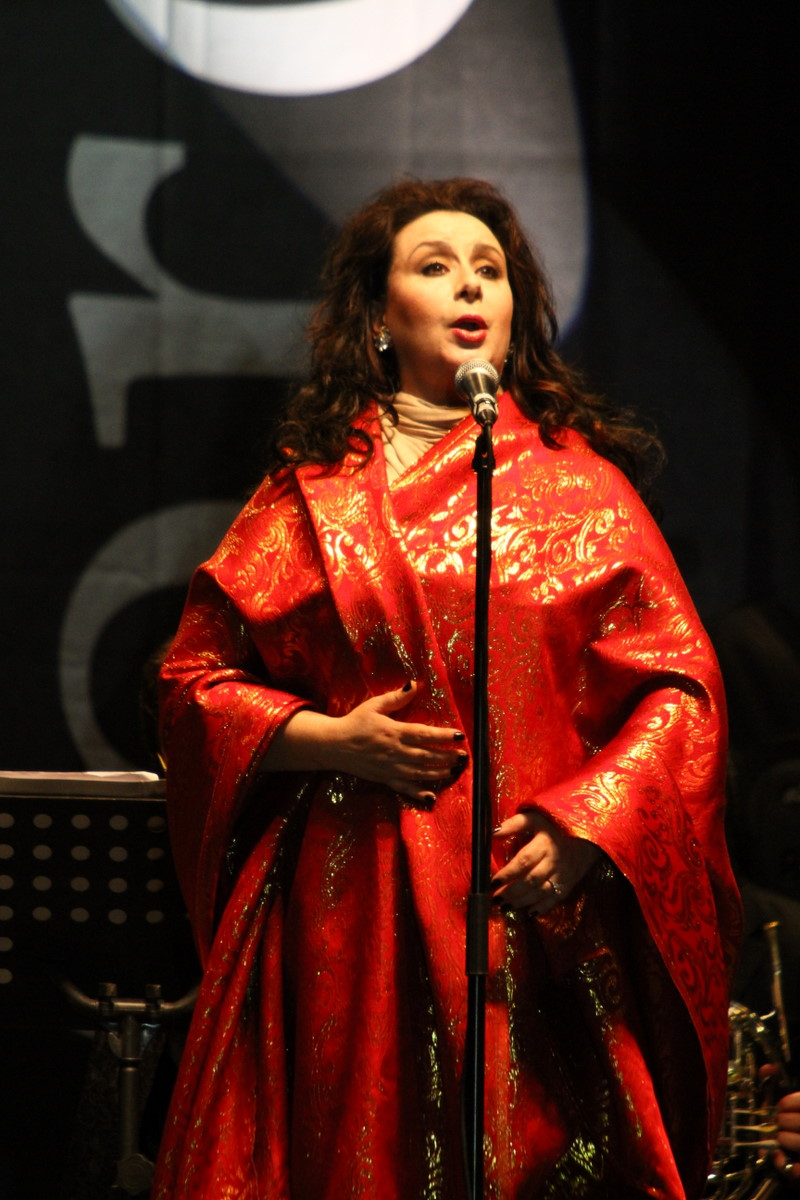
Verónica Villarroel in 2011

Verónica Villarroel González (born 1962) is a Chilean operatic soprano. She won the Metropolitan Opera National Council Auditions in 1989, and, from 1992 until her effective retirement from the stage in 2014, sang leading roles throughout Chile, as well as in New York and across the world. She then established her own academy, and later the Verónica Villarroel Foundation to provide scholarships for young singers.

== Early life ==
Villarroel was born in Santiago, Chile on 2 October 1965. She went to school at Instituto Anglo Chileno (now Colegio Anglo Maipu) and then studied publicity and advertising at university in Santiago, but was forced to leave her studies and start working because her father had a heart attack.

== Singing career ==
After leaving university, a friend took Villarroel to see opera at the Teatro Cariola. She was hooked, and a few weeks later learned that the chorus was looking for women singers; she auditioned and was given a place. Villarroel's career took off thanks to the soprano Renata Scotto, whom she considers her "musical godmother". Scotto discovered her when they shared the stage of Santiago's Municipal Theatre in May 1986, Villarroel playing Musetta to Scotto's Mimì in Giacomo Puccini's La Bohème.

Villarroel subsequently won a scholarship to the Juilliard School in New York, where she studied singing with Ellen Faull. She won the Metropolitan Opera's National Council Auditions in 1989, and made her debut on the Met's stage in December 1991, again in La Bohème, this time playing Mimì.

In February 2009, she performed at the opening of the second day of the 50th Viña del Mar International Song Festival, where she received several prizes: the silver and gold torches, and the silver seagull. On that occasion, she performed the aria "Un bel dì, vedremo" from Madama Butterfly and "Canción con todos".

In 2011 she founded her singing academy in Santiago, and in June 2016 she set up the Verónica Villarroel Foundation, which seeks to support young people in their musical careers.

Villarroel is one of six siblings. Her younger sister, Maria Isabel (Maribel) Villarroel-Contador, is also a classical music singer.

== Performances ==
A comprehensive list of Villarroel's performances is available on Operabase. Notable performances include:

- Her stage debut at the Municipal Theatre in Santiago in 1986, playing Musetta in La Bohème
- Her international debut in Barcelona in 1990, playing Fiordiligi in Così fan tutte
- Her Metropolitan Opera debut in 1991, playing Mimì in La Bohème
- In Los Angeles in 2014, playing Florencia Grimaldi in Florencia en el Amazonas

== Discography ==
- Huellas de tu amor (2007)
- Cuando estoy contigo (2009)
- Navidad en el parque (2015)

== Prizes and awards ==
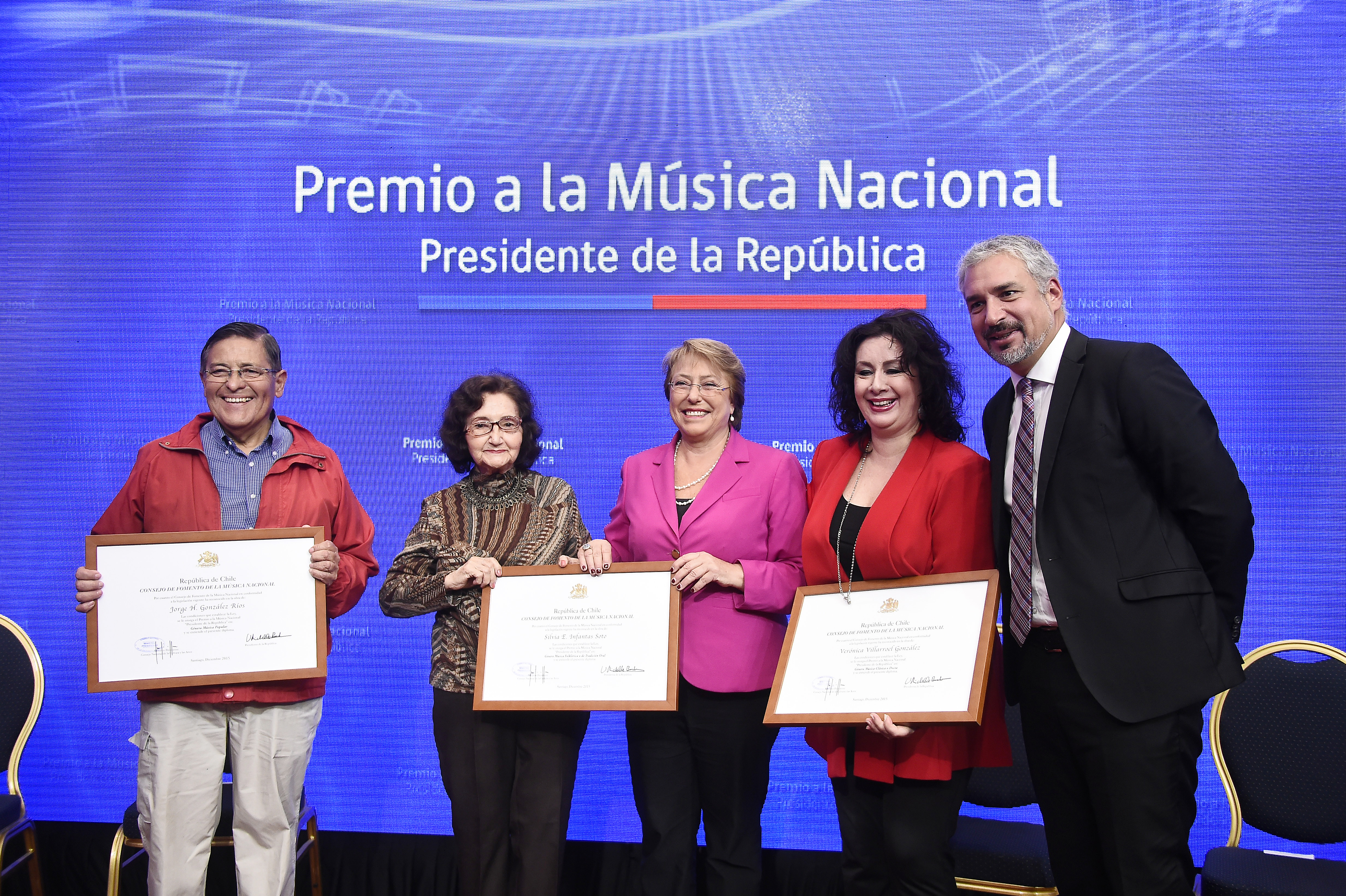
Villarroel (second on the right) at the presentation of the President of the Republic National Music Award in 2015

Villarroel has received a number of prizes and awards, including:

- 2002 - Plácido Domingo Award for the most important Latin American lyric artist
- 2007 - Medal of Women
- 2010 - recognised as one of 100 women leaders in Chile
- 2011 - Premio Bicentenario del Círculo de Críticos de Arte
- 2012 - Scotiabank's Advancement of Women Award
- 2015 - President of the Republic National Music Award in the classical music category

== General references ==
- Meléndez-Haddad, Pablo (1999). "Verónica Villarroel 'por fin he aceptado la vida del cantante'". Opera Actual (31): 32–34. ISSN 1133-4134.
