= Bérénice (Magnard) =

Opera in three acts by the French composer Albéric Magnard

- by Albéric Magnard
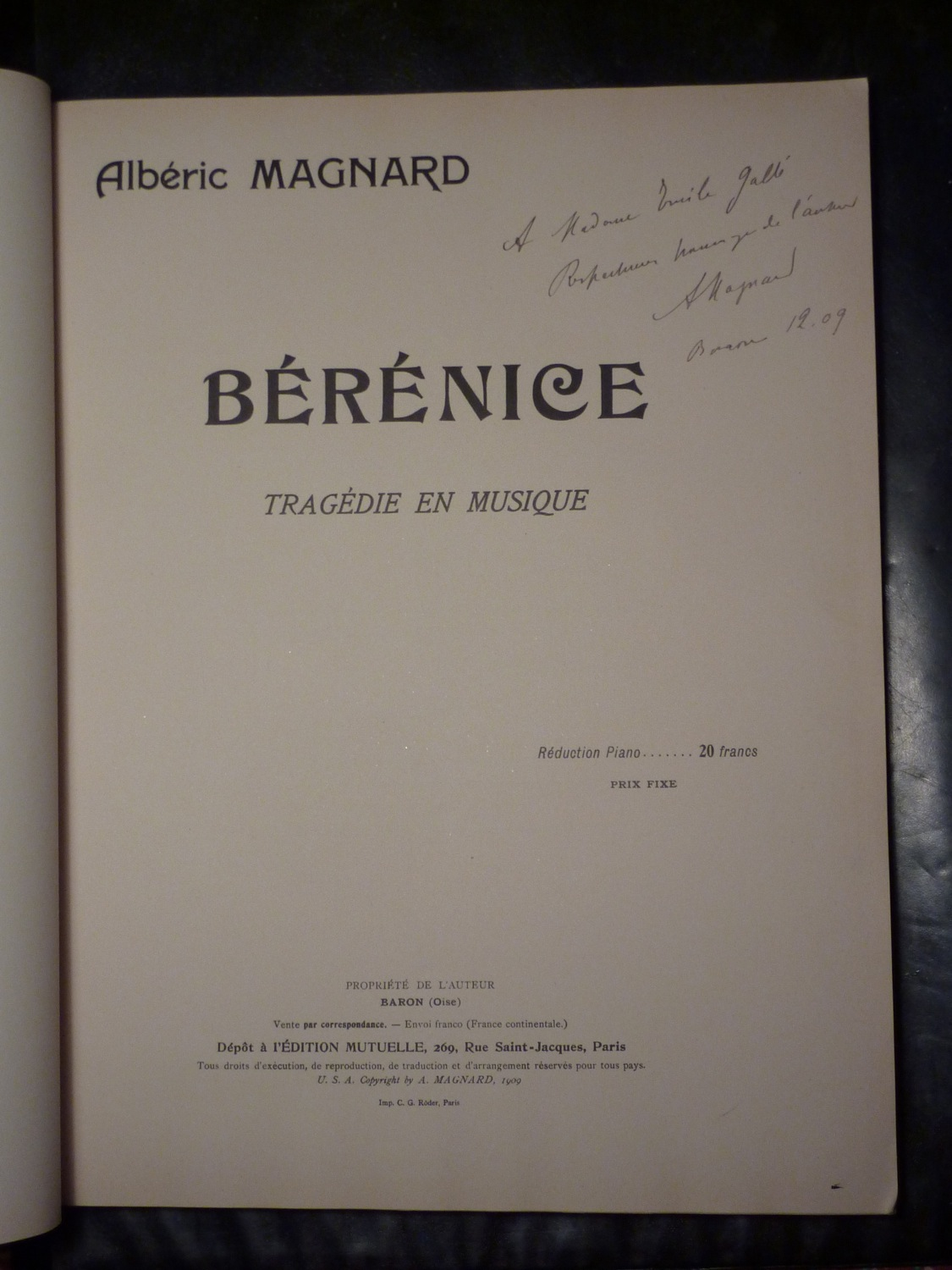
- Librettist: Albéric Magnard
- Language: French
- Based on: Bérénice by Jean Racine
- Premiere: 15 December 1911; Opéra-Comique, Paris

Bérénice is an opera in three acts by the French composer Albéric Magnard to his own libretto after the tragedy of the same name by Racine. It was first performed at the Paris Opéra-Comique on 15 December 1911. The work received only nine performances at the Salle Favart in its first 40 years.

== Background and history ==
A vocal score was published in 1909 dedicated to Guy Ropartz, and thus the work avoided the fate of Magnard's other operas Yolande and Guercœur whose scores were damaged by the fire at his house in the opening days of the First World War. The opera was broadcast on French radio in 1936 and 1961, and was revived on stage in Marseille in 2001 conducted by Gaetano Delogu and at the Grand Théâtre de Tours in 2014 for the Magnard centenary, conducted by Jean-Yves Ossonce. A concert performance was given at the Carnegie Hall by the American Symphony Orchestra conducted by Leon Botstein in January 2011.

Stylistically in the line of the tragédie lyrique of Rameau, Gluck or Berlioz, Magnard bases each act around a love duet for the two principal characters, and ends all three quietly. The tessitura of Titus is roughly that of Pelléas, although the role was created by a tenor. Martin Cooper describes the drama as "largely psychological", and notes Magnard's "experiments in the use of abstract forms in opera". Examples are the love music for Bérénice and Titus as a canon at an octave interval, and Titus's meditation in Act 2 as a fugue, representing a midpoint between the symphonic style of Wagner and the use of abstract forms in Wozzeck.

Leon Botstein argues that the opera is "more than an intimate love story", but a subject with political symbolism for its time. After the Dreyfus affair, Magnard, a dreyfusard, gives a positive depiction of the Jewish queen forced out by the Roman populace, and where the leaders of Rome fail to stand up for justice. He describes the opera as a "morality play about the symmetry between the happiness of intimacy and love and the pursuit of truth and justice in the public sphere", with the title character Bérénice as a post-1906 Dreyfus figure, while Titus can be seen as France. Magnard had resigned his commission in 1899 in disgust at the Dreyfus affair, composing a "Hymne à la Justice", first performed in 1903, as an expression of his strong feelings on the matter.

== Roles ==
Roles, voice types, premiere cast
| Role | Voice type | Premiere cast, 15 December 1911 Conductor: François Ruhlmann |
|---|---|---|
| Bérénice, a Jewish princess | soprano | Marguerite Mérentié |
| Lia, nurse to Bérénice | contralto | Marie Charbonnel |
| Titus, Emperor of Rome | baritone | Laurent Swolfs |
| Mucien, Praetorian Prefect | bass | Félix Vieuille |
| An officer | tenor | Gaston de Poumayrac |
| Chef de la flotte | baritone | Louis Vaurs |
| A slave | bass | Paul Payan |
Off-stage chorus in the gardens; crowd of Romans; Sailors off-stage

== Synopsis ==
The plot concerns the departure of the Judean queen Bérénice from Rome by command of Emperor Titus on his ascent to the throne. In the preface to his play, Racine writes "Titus, who passionately loved Bérénice and who was widely thought to have promised to marry her, sent her from Rome, in spite of himself and in spite of herself, in the early days of his empire."

The first act takes place on the outskirts of Rome, the second act in Rome itself, and the third act at the Ostian harbour.

Bérénice and Titus end the first act still in apparent amorous harmony despite being aware of the precariousness of their love. At the beginning of Act 2, Titus has been crowned emperor on the death of Vespasian. Aware of the hatred of the Romans for his queen he agonizes between his love for her and loyalty to his homeland. Mucien, a senior Praetorian guard, warns him off a further meeting with Bérénice but the emperor does come to the queen's boat before she sheds her locks and quietly departs.
