= Marie Charbonnel =

French opera singer

Marie Louise Charbonnel (1880–1969) was a French contralto opera singer who made her début at the Lyon Opera in 1901. She was spectacularly successful at her Paris Opera début in 1907 when she played Dalila in Camille Saint-Saëns' Samson et Dalila.

== Biography ==
Born on 18 December 1880 in Lyon, Marie Louise Charbonnel studied music theory, piano and voice at the Lyon Conservatory. At the Lyon Opera, she performed contralto roles in Gluck's Orphée et Euridice, Carmen, Amneris in Aida, and Azucena in Il trovatore. On 24 February 1906 at the Monte Carlo Opera, she played Vanina at the première of Saint-Saëns' L'ancêtre. She also sang at the Paris Opera, playing the First Norn in the French première of Götterdämmerung (1908) and Erda in the première of Das Rheingold.

From 1910, Charbonnel sang at the Opéra-Comique, first in the title role of Carmen. On 30 November that year, she played the Third Witch in the première of Ernest Bloch's Macbeth and on 15 December 1911, she created the role of Lia in the first performance of Albéric Magnard's Bérénice.

Charbonnel appeared in the principal opera houses in the French provinces as well as at the Theatre de la Monnaie in Brussels. Together with Ketty Lapeyrette, she was one of the two leading French contraltos of her day. Her most important roles were in Gluck's Orphée et Eurydice, as Mother in Gustave Charpentier's Louise, as Mary in The Flying Dutchman and as Pygmalion in Victor Massé's Galathée.

After retiring from the stage, she lived in Paris. Marie Charbonnel died in Couilly-Pont-aux-Dames on 24 April 1969.
