= Guercœur =

1931 opera by Albéric Magnard

- Opera by Albéric Magnard
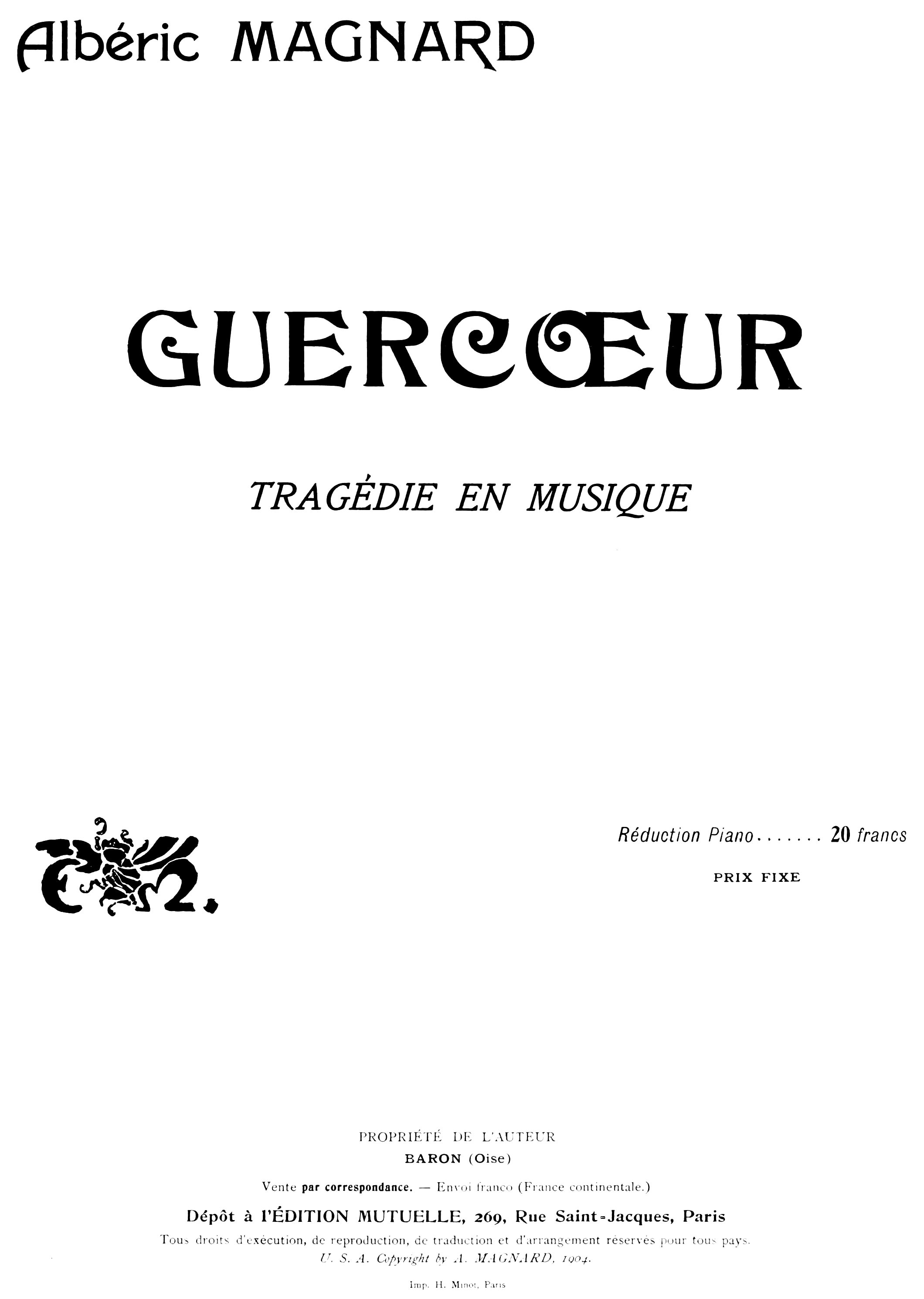
- Title page of the piano score, 1904
- Librettist: Magnard
- Language: French
- Premiere: 24 April 1931; Palais Garnier, Paris

Guercœur is an opera in three acts by the French composer Albéric Magnard to his own libretto. It was first performed posthumously at the Paris Opéra on 24 April 1931, though it had mostly been written between 1897 and 1901. The music shows the influence of Wagner.

== History ==
Albéric Magnard, a composer whose chamber and symphonic works were performed, composed Guercœur as his second opera to his own libretto between 1897 and 1901. He then tried in vain to find a theatre ready to produce it. The composer died trying to save his house from the invading Germans at the beginning of World War I in 1914, and the score was partially destroyed in the resulting fire. Magnard's friend Guy Ropartz reconstructed the missing sections from the vocal score so the opera could be staged.

It was first performed posthumously at the Paris Opéra on 24 April 1931.

=== Performances ===
After the premiere, the opera received its next production more than 80 years later at Theater Osnabrück in June 2019 with Rhys Jenkins in the title role, conducted by Andreas Hotz. The Opéra du Rhin staged the opera in Strasbourg in April 2024 (only the second known production in France) conducted by Ingo Metzmacher, with Stéphane Degout in the title role. In 2025, Oper Frankfurt staged the opera, conducted by Marie Jacquot (title role: Domen Križaj). The stage design was inspired by the Bonn Chancellor's bungalow (Act I + II) and the United Nations Security Council (Act III).

== Roles ==
Role	Voice type	Premiere cast Conductor: François Ruhlmann
Guercœur	baritone	Arthur Endrèze
Heurtal	tenor	Victor Forti
Giselle	soprano	Marisa Ferrer
La Verité	soprano	Yvonne Gall
Beauté	mezzo-soprano	
Bonté	soprano	Germaine Hoerner
Souffrance	contralto	
L'ombre d'une femme	mezzo-soprano	
L'ombre d'une vierge	soprano	
L'ombre d'un poète	tenor	Raoul Jobin

== Synopsis ==
Guercœur, the wise ruler of a medieval city-state, has died in battle defending his people. In Heaven, he begs to be allowed to return to earth to save his city. His wish is granted but he finds his best friend, Heurtal, has become the lover of his widow, Giselle, and is planning to rule as a despot after marrying her. Shocked, Guercœur attempts to convince the people to reject corruption, but they become increasingly angry with him, and in the end he is murdered. Disillusioned with humanity, he returns to heaven, where he is greeted by the Goddess of Truth. She assures him that despite human weaknesses, a great age of humanity lies ahead.

== Recordings ==
- 1951 Bernard Demigny, Marcelle Bunlet, Fernand Faniard, Marisa Ferrer; orchestra and chorus conducted by Tony Aubin (Bourg, 1985)
- 1986 José van Dam, Hildegard Behrens, Gary Lakes, Nadine Denize, Orfeón Donostiarra, Toulouse Capitole Orchestra, conducted by Michel Plasson (EMI, 1987)
