= Le Pays =

Le Pays (The Land) is a three-act opera by Guy Ropartz with a libretto by Charles Le Goffic. It was composed between 1908 and 1910 and was premiered in 1912 at Nancy. It is an important example of the Breton cultural renaissance of the early 20th century.

== Origins ==
=== Libretto ===
Ropartz stated that he was looking for an opera subject that involved "interiorised action; few events; feelings; few characters; no spectacle." He was given a copy of Le Goffic's short story collection Passions Celtes (1908), and was immediately attracted to the story L'islandaise (The Icelandic Girl), which describes a doomed love affair between the girl and a stranded Breton fisherman. It was based on the lives of the Breton "Icelanders", who fished in Icelandic waters and sometimes stayed there for periods. Ropartz had already created a score for Louis Tiercelin's stage adaptation of Pierre Loti's novel Pêcheur d'Islande (An Iceland Fisherman) on the same basic theme. Ropartz asked Le Goffic to adapt his story for the stage.

=== Music ===
Ropartz's style is influenced by the form of Wagner's music dramas and the structural innovations of César Franck. Ropartz makes frequent use of leitmotives and also incorporates elements of Breton folk melodies to represent the hero's nostalgia for his homeland. The critic Michel Fleury argues that the music is built around four main themes, one of which represents Iceland, and in particular the bog which plays a role in the narrative; one represents the main female character and the emotion of love associated with her; another represents the male character and his nostalgia for Brittany. The fourth theme represents stability, associated with the heroine's father.

== Characters ==
- Kaethe, an Icelandic girl - soprano
- Tual, a Breton fisherman - tenor
- Jörgen, Kaethe's father - baritone

== Synopsis ==
Act I.

Autumn: A cottage in Iceland: Tual, a Breton fisherman who has survived a shipwreck, has been recuperating in the home of Jörgen, an old trapper. He is tended by Kaethe, Jörgen's daughter. She suggests that Tual must be nostalgic for his Breton home. Tual reminds her that after he had dragged himself ashore from the shipwreck, he nearly died in the Hrafuaga, a dangerous Icelandic swamp; only Jörgen's timely arrival saved him. All the other fishermen on the ship were drowned, so everyone in Brittany will think him dead and he has no ties there anymore. Tual declares his love for Kaethe. Kaethe is worried that Tual's feelings may be temporary, but says she loves him too. In the absence of a preacher Jörgen "marries" the couple by insisting that Tual dedicate himself to Kaethe by swearing on the "mud of Hrafuaga" that if he ever abandons her it will swallow him up.

Act 2

Spring: The Icelandic shore: Tual dreams of Paimpol, his home in Brittany, while making a small fishing boat. He sings Breton folk songs. Kaethe says she has seen a sadness in him for his homeland and worries that he will sail back to Brittany. Tual says his boat is too small for anything more than local waters. Kaethe tells him she is pregnant with his child, hoping that this will keep him beside her. Kaethe sings him a Nordic ballad about "Sir Olaf", who was abducted by the Queen of the Fairies. His loyal wife Lady Hilda waited for him for a hundred years, so that they could renew their love and die together. Tual says that they will live and die together like Olaf and Hilda.

Act 3

Spring: The cottage: Kathe muses on Tual's increasingly withdrawn behaviour. Jörgen returns home tipsy after drinking gin and reminisces about Kaethe's late mother, describing how they grew up together. When Tual enters Jörgen mentions that some Paimpol fishermen have arrived at the village of Seidsfjord. Tual is excited and asks if it is easy to get there. Jörgen says that if the Hrafuaga swamp is still frozen, it can be crossed in time to catch them. Tual tries to put the thought out of his mind, but as he sleeps with Kaethe he has a dream of Brittany. In his vision he sees the rolling Breton landscape and the white sails of the Paimpol fishing fleet. He leaves and tries to cross the Hrafuaga. Kaethe watches as the swamp cracks and swallows him.
