= Pelléas et Mélisande (Herbert von Karajan recording) =

- EMI Records CD: CDS 7 49350 2

Studio album by Herbert von Karajan
- Released: 1979
- Studio: Philharmonie, Berlin
- Genre: Opera
- Length: 162:09
- Language: French
- Producer: Michel Glotz

Pelléas et Mélisande is a 162-minute studio album of Claude Debussy's opera, performed by Christine Barbaux, José van Dam, Nadine Denize, Ruggero Raimondi, Frederica von Stade, Richard Stilwell and Pascal Thomas with the Chorus of the German Opera Berlin and the Berlin Philharmonic Orchestra under the direction of Herbert von Karajan. It was released in 1979.

== Recording ==
The album was recorded using analogue technology in December 1978 in the Philharmonie, Berlin.

== Critical reception ==
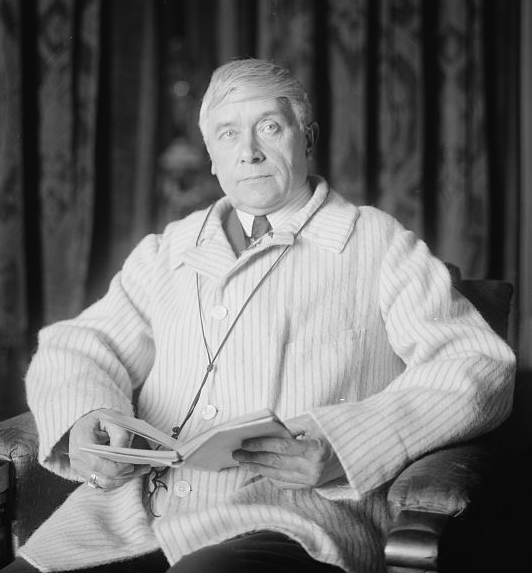
Maurice Maeterlinck, Pelléas et Mélisande's Belgian librettist

Lionel Salter reviewed the album on LP in Gramophone in December 1979, comparing it with an earlier recording of the opera conducted by Pierre Boulez. Frederica von Stade wrote, "well conveys Mélisande's wide-eyed innocence and simplicity by her purity of voice and lightness of tone, and makes credible the transition from the startled gazelle of the opening to the awakening woman of Act 4". Richard Stilwell was equally well cast as a keen, lively, likeable, Pelléas, rhapsodic in his two brief erotic climaxes. His bariton-martin negotiated Pelléas's tricky tessitura without any signs of strain. As Golaud, José van Dam gave a "distinguished" performance, equally convincing in the Prince's inability to understand Mélisande, his chilling passive aggression and his paroxysms of murderous fury. Christine Barbaux was an "effective and unaffectedly childlike" en travesti Yniold, and there was no cause for complaint either about Nadine Denize's Geneviève. The only soloist who was significantly disappointing was Ruggero Raimondi. It was not his fault that his Arkel sounded too much like Pascal. Thomas's physician in their scene at Mélisande's death bed, but he should have defined the King's character more clearly, and he should have been more conscientious in observing Debussy's meticulously crafted speech rhythms (a sin of which some of his colleagues were guilty too, although not to the same extent). Conducting a "uniquely subtle score" in which "understatement [was] customary", Herbert von Karajan presented an interpretation that was "decidedly unorthodox" to the point of blatantly defying some of the dynamics that Debussy had stipulated. His Pelléas "seethes with barely-suppressed tensions which constantly erupt in passionate outbursts: again and again the orchestra boils over in an ecstasy which can scarcely be contained by the sound engineers". Karajan's reading was powerfully atmospheric and "often ravishing, with a rich, glowing warmth", but his handling of his orchestra threw a veil over some of the score's finer details. The album's audio quality too had both strengths and weaknesses. On the one hand, the changes of acoustic in the scenes set in a grotto and in the castle's vaults were managed adroitly. On the other, Pelléas was sometimes too loud, Geneviève's letter reading was too quiet and a few of Mélisande's words and the cries of the off-stage sailors were barely audible at all. In sum, the album provided "a very characteristic Karajan performance, deeply committed and full of beautiful if contentious things". Whether it was better or worse than Boulez's cooler, clearer version depended upon where one believed the truth of Debussy's opera to lie.

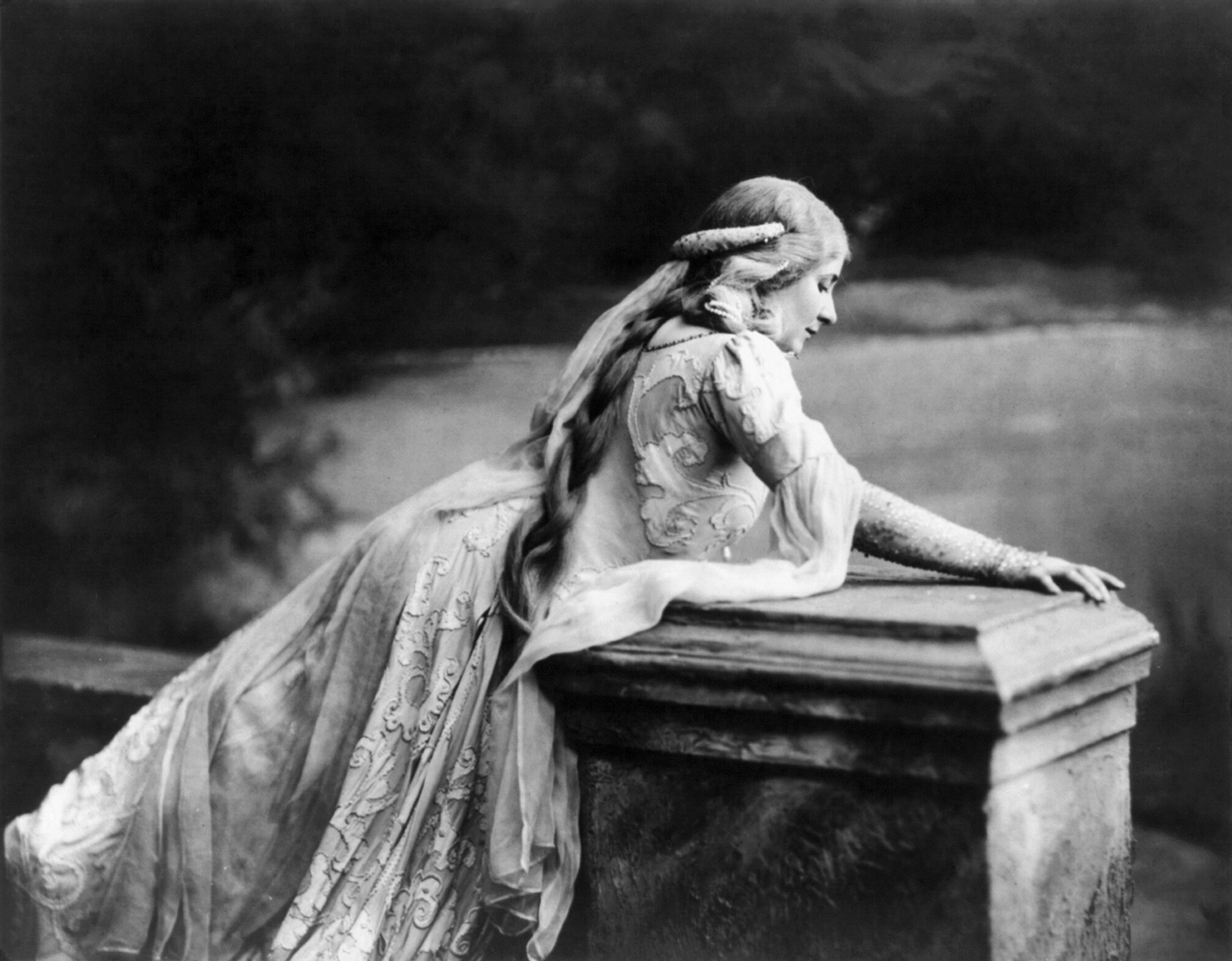
The Scottish soprano Mary Garden as Mélisande in the opera's 1908 American première

James Goodfriend reviewed the album on LP in Stereo Review in March 1980. Frederica von Stade, he wrote, as the "mystery-surrounded Mélisande, is not only innocent and evasive, but, when the time comes, passionate, despondent, welcoming of death, ... tragic rather than pathetic". Richard Stilwell's Pelléas was eager despite his fear, José van Dam's Golaud genuine and traumatized, Ruggero Raimondi's Arkel embracing and aptly Debussyan, Christine Barbaux's Yniold excellent, Nadine Denize's Geneviève euphonious and Pascal Thomas's shepherd and physician entirely satisfactory. The Berlin Philharmonic supplied a "voluptuous sonic cushion" with none of the nasal string sound that a French orchestra would have produced. The salient features of Herbert von Karajan's interpretation were its "meticulous attention to changing sonorities" and its muscularity as a piece of music drama. An opera usually represented almost as though it were a dream was instead made into a story of "real characters with real emotions", "a bigger, stronger, more varied music" than anyone had discovered in the score before. EMI's production team had favoured strings over woodwinds and voices but not culpably so, and had achieved an audio quality commendable for "its clarity, its warmth and beauty of sound and its exceedingly wide dynamic range". The album, in short, was "splendid".

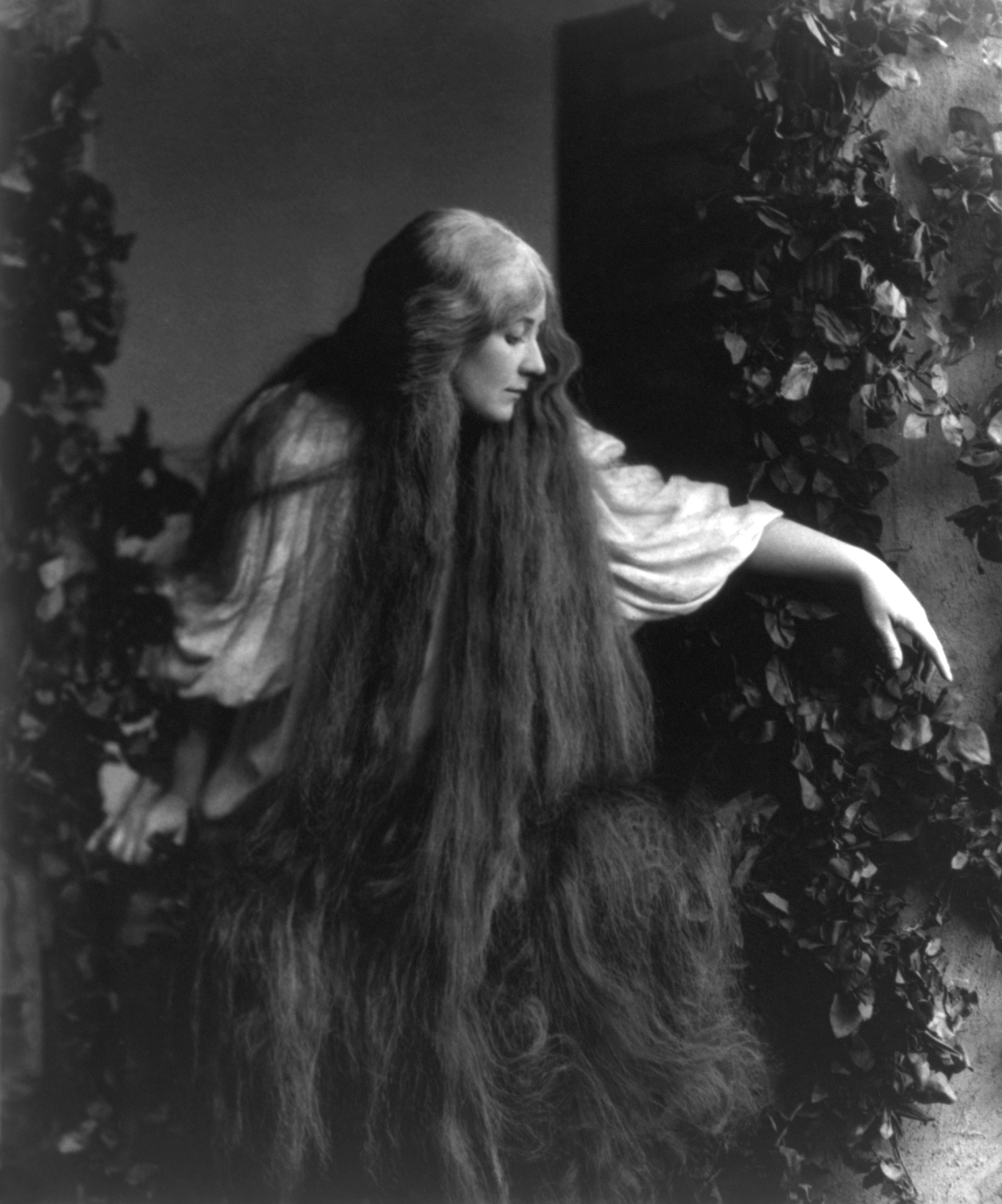
Mary Garden in the American première's tower scene

J. B. Steane reviewed the album on LP in Gramophone in April 1980. Frederica von Stade, he wrote, "so very girl-like, unoperatic in tone, gives an infinitely touching performance". The recording's male singers did not give him quite as much pleasure, not because they were guilty of doing anything wrong but because their voices were too alike to allow Debussy to deploy the full range of colours on his palette. The orchestra played with "great beauty" and the production was first rate. But the album's supreme excellence lay in "the inspiration of Karajan's intellect and sensitivity, seen here completely at the service of finding out the heart of the music". From the first bar of the opera to its last, Karajan had achieved an "extraordinary dreamlike concentration" in which the listener was engaged in the emotional life of believable men and women. Never before, Steane thought, had Pelléas et Mélisande moved him so deeply, either on disc or even in the theatre. He had no doubt that the album would endure as "one of the classics of the gramophone".

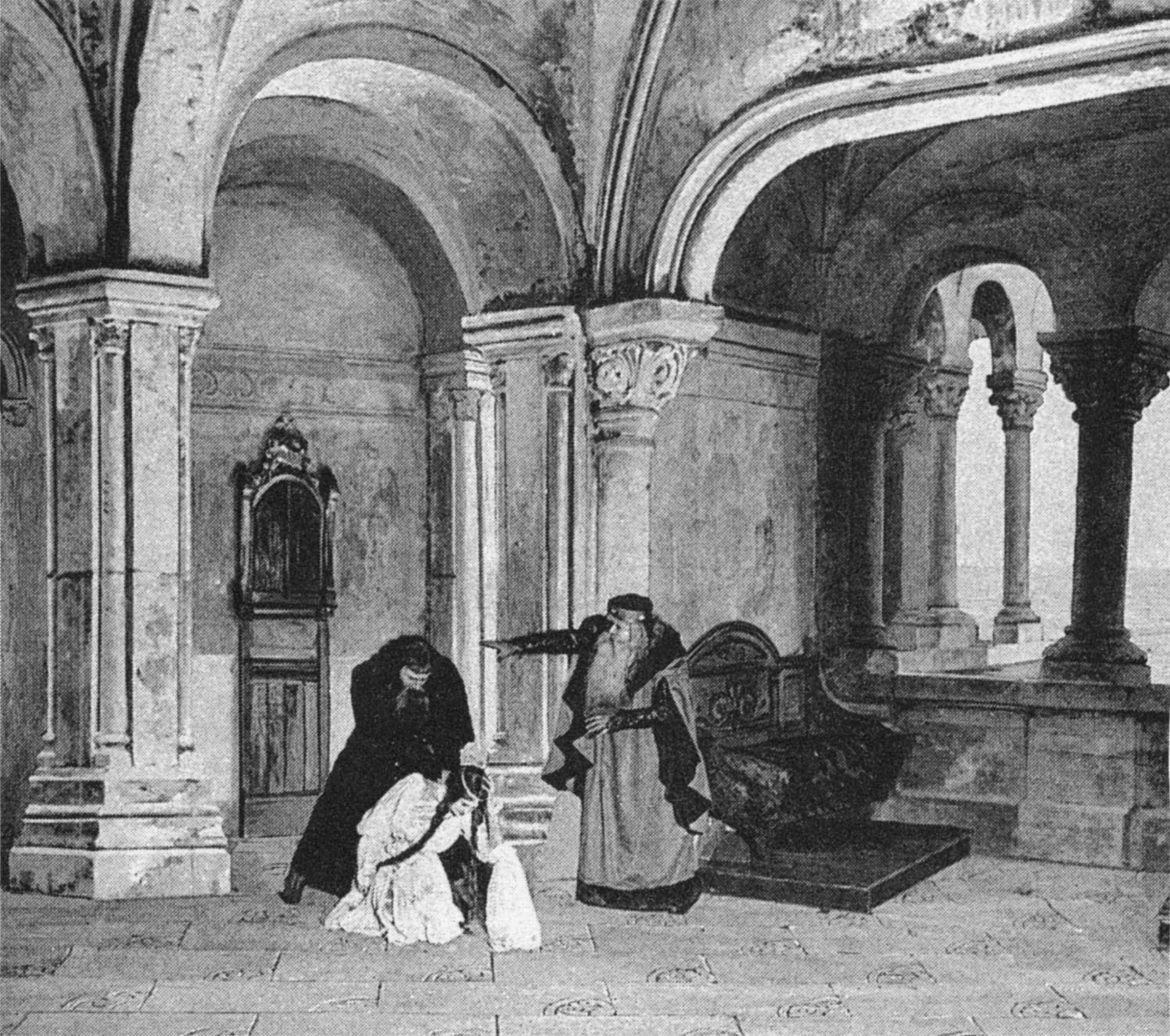
Mélisande, Golaud and Arkel in Act 4, Scene 2 of the opera's 1902 world première

Hilary Finch reviewed the album on CD in Gramophone in February 1988. "Frederica von Stade's Mélisande", she wrote, "is without doubt the central performance: there is the sense of animal instinct, the raw nerve endings, the simplicity ... And there is, above all, her sensitivity to the changes of register". José van Dam's Golaud managed to elicit compassion despite being altogether the man "fait au fer et au sang" (made of iron and blood). Ruggero Raimondi, a younger-sounding Arkel than some, sang with a praiseworthy legato. The only disappointment among the soloists was Richard Stilwell, whose Pelléas was "less than sensuous, and nowhere near an expressive match for von Stade's Mélisande". The orchestra steered a judicious course between the Scylla of too much homogeneity and the Charybdis of too little, with sumptuous string tone and slender, piercing woodwinds. Herbert von Karajan's interpretation, a "great crescendo of inexorability", had been accused of unduly emphasizing the Wagnerian element in Debussy's musical personality against which the composer had struggled. However, it had been Debussy's ambition to paint a symphony of light and shade, and this was what Karajan's album provided.

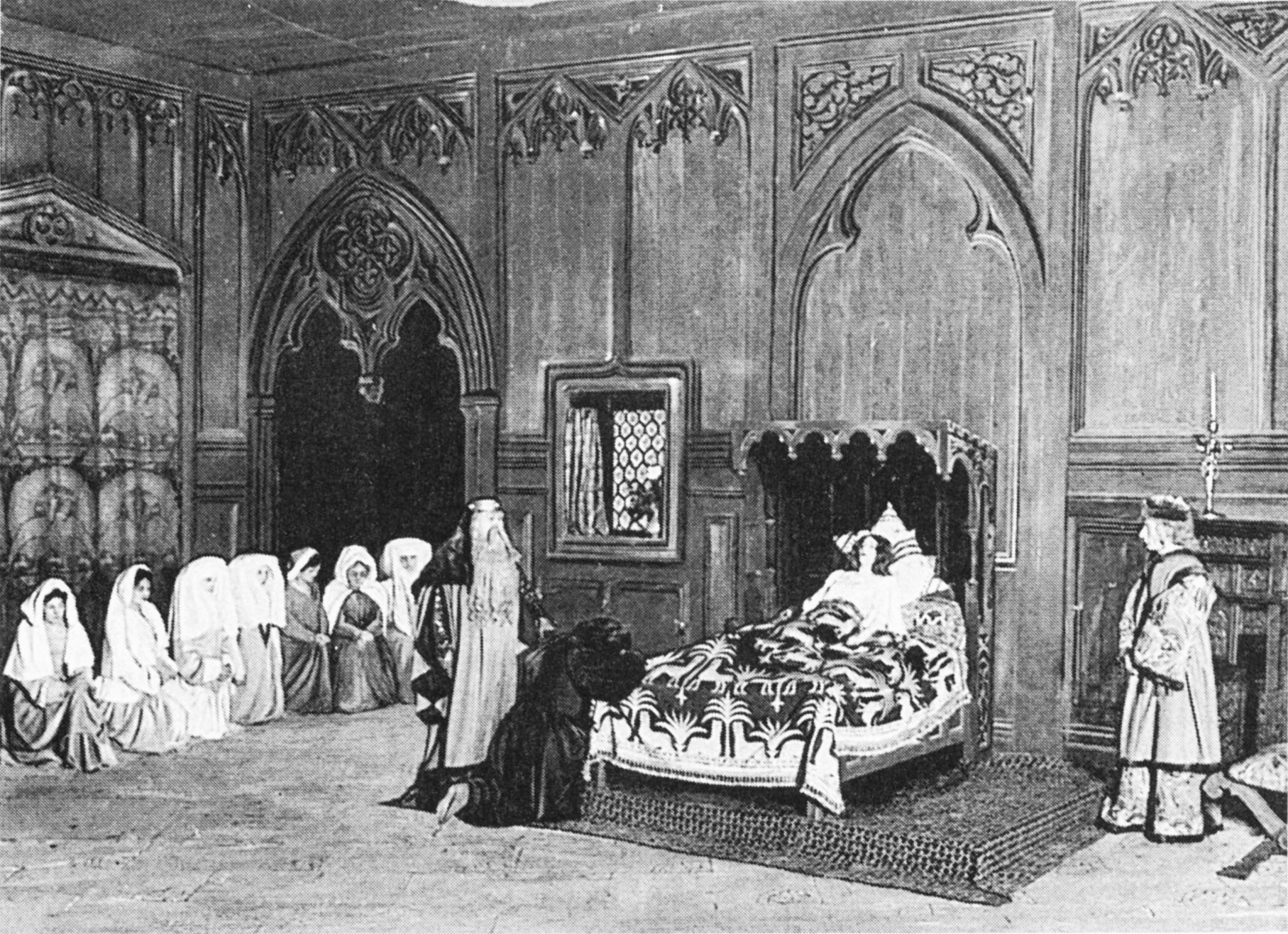
Mary Garden as Mélisande on her death bed in Act 5 of the opera's world première

Lionel Salter returned to the album to review it on CD in Gramophone in November 1999. As before, he thought that its greatest virtue was its cast. Frederica von Stade was "a quite lovely, pure-voiced Mélisande, childishly innocent in her actions but with a touchingly vulnerable and emotional core". Richard Stilwell, "young, eager and ardent", was "a very likeable Pelléas". José van Dam, impeccably conscientious as always, was a "bluff, bewildered Golaud who cannot understand the delicate creature on whom he had stumbled". The secondary roles were performed satisfactorily too. But Herbert von Karajan's interpretation and EMI's production of it were both as disappointing as they had been two decades earlier. Debussy had insisted that his music should be the servant of Maurice Maeterlinck's text, and had practised an aesthetic of "Gallic restraint and understatement". Karajan had brazenly betrayed the composer with "a voluptuously lush orchestral sound that, ravishing as it is, ... again and again boils over in a scarcely containable ecstasy". The engineering of the album was marred by several instances of erratic balancing and a general "kind of patina ... which acts like a dark varnish on a painting". The album remained as controversial and as thought-provoking as it had been when first released.

The Francophile musical historian Roger Nichols mentioned the album in a survey of the opera's discography in Gramophone in May 2002: "Karajan is Karajan - not for me, but I know some people like it."

== Track listing: CD1 ==
Claude Debussy (1862-1918)

Pelléas et Mélisande (1902), opera in five acts, with a libretto by Maurice Maeterlinck (1862-1949) from his play of the same name

Act One

Scene 1: A forest

- 1 (5:53) Je ne pourrai plus sortir de cette fôret (Golaud, Mélisande)
- 2 (7:31) Qu'est-ce qui brille ainsi, au fond de l'eau? (Golaud, Mélisande)

Scene 2: A room in the castle

- 3 (3:06) Voici ce qu'il écrit à son frère Pelléas (Geneviève)
- 4 (3:45) Je n'en dis rien (Arkel, Geneviève)
- 5 (3:59) Grand-père, j'ai reçu en même temps que la lettre de mon frère (Pelléas, Arkel, Geneviève)

Scene 3: In front of the castle

- 6 (2:16) Il fait sombre dans les jardins (Mélisande, Geneviève, Pelléas)
- 7 (3:59) Hoë! Hisse hoë! Hoë! Hoë! (Chorus, Mélisande, Pelléas, Geneviève)

Act Two

Scene 1: A fountain in the park

- 8 (3:42) Vous ne savez pas où je vous ai menée? (Pelléas, Mélisande)
- 9 (6:32) C'est au bord d'une fontaine aussi qu'il vous a trouvée? (Pelléas, Mélisande)

Scene 2: A room in the castle

- 10 (2:49) Ah! Ah! Tout va bien, cela ne sera rien (Golaud, Mélisande)
- 11 (6:28) Je suis... je suis malade ici (Mélisande, Geneviève)
- 12 (5:35) Tiens, où est l'anneau que je t'avais donné? (Golaud, Mélisande)

Scene 3: In front of a cave

- 13 (4:51) Oui, c'est ici, nous y sommes (Pelléas, Mélisande)

== Track listing: CD2 ==
Act Three

Scene 1: One of the castle towers

- 1 (5:17) Mes longs cheveux descendent (Mélisande, Pelléas)
- 2 (2:54) Oh! Oh! Mes cheveux descendent de la tour (Mélisande, Pelléas)
- 3 (7:20) Je les noue, je les noue aux branches de saule (Pelléas, Mélisande, Geneviève)

Scene 2: The castle vaults

- 4 (2:14) Prenez garde, par ici, par ici (Golaud, Pelléas)

Scene 3: A terrace at the entrance to the vaults

- 5 (6:04) Ah! Je respire enfin! (Pelléas, Golaud)

Scene 4: In front of the castle

- 6 (6:33) Viens, nous allons nous asseoir ici, Yniold (Golaud, Yniold)
- 7 (4:01) Ah! Ah! Petite mère a allumé sa lampe (Yniold, Golaud)

== Track listing: CD3 ==
Act Four

Scene 1: A room in the castle

- 1 (4:01) Oǜ vas-tu? Il faut que je parle ce soir (Pelléas, Mélisande)

Scene 2: A room in the castle

- 2 (5:15) Maintenant que le père de Pelléas est sauvé (Arkel, Mélisande)
- 3 (0:55) Pelléas part ce soir (Golaud, Arkel, Mélisande)
- 4 (11:12) Apporte-la (Golaud, Arkel, Mélisande)

Scene 3: A fountain in the park

- 5 (4:05) Oh! Cette pierre est lourde (Yniold, Shepherd)

Scene 4: A fountain in the park

- 6 (6:11) C'est le dernier soir (Pelléas, Mélisande)
- 7 (4:10) On dirait que ta voix a passé sur la mer au printemps! (Pelléas, Mélisande)
- 8 (4:32) Quel est ce bruit? On ferme les portes (Pelléas, Mélisande)

Act Five

Scene: A room in the castle

- 9 (3:43) Ce n'est pas de cette petite blessure qu'elle peut mourir (Physician, Arkel, Golaud)
- 10 (4:09) Ouvrez la fenêtre, ouvrez la fenêtre (Mélisande, Arkel, Physician)
- 11 (4:46) Mélisande... Mélisande / Est-ce vous, Golaud? (Golaud, Mélisande)
- 12 (2:19) Non, non, nous n'avons pas été coupable (Mélisande, Golaud)
- 13 (2:48) Qu'avez vous fait? Vous allez la tuer (Arkel, Golaud, Mélisande)
- 14 (2:37) Qu'y-a-t-il? Qu'est-ce que toutes ces femmes viennent faire ici? (Golaud, Physician, Arkel)
- 15 (6:16) Attention... attention (Arkel, Physician)

== Personnel ==
=== Performers ===
- Ruggero Raimondi (bass), Arkel, King of Allemonde
- Nadine Denize (mezzo-soprano), Geneviève, mother of Golaud and Pelléas
- José van Dam (baritone), Prince Golaud, a widower, grandson of Arkel
- Richard Stilwell (baritone), Pelléas, grandson of Arkel, younger half-brother of Golaud
- Frederica von Stade (mezzo-soprano), Mélisande
- Christine Barbaux (soprano), Yniold, young son of Golaud
- Pascal Thomas (bass), Shepherd and Physician
- Choir of the German Opera Berlin (chorus master: Walter Hagen-Groll)
- Berlin Philharmonic Orchestra
- Herbert von Karajan, conductor

=== Other ===
- Janine Reiss, French language coach
- Michel Glotz, producer
- Wolfgang Gülich, balance engineer

== Release history ==
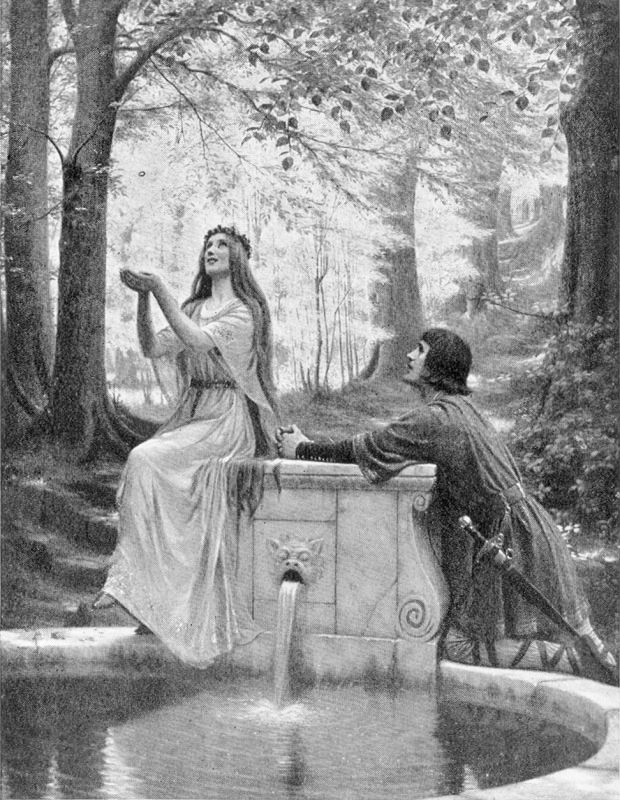
Pelléas and Mélisande by the fountain in the park, imagined by Edmund Blair Leighton

In 1979, the album was released as a triple LP by Angel Records in the USA and by EMI Records elsewhere: the catalogue numbers were SZCX 3885 and SLS 5172 respectively. Both releases included a booklet with notes, texts and translations. The album was also issued on cassette (catalogue number TC SLS 5172), again with a booklet with notes, texts and translations.

In 1987, the album was released as a triple CD by Angel Records in the USA and by EMI Records elsewhere: the catalogue numbers were CDCC 49350 and CDS 7 49350 2 respectively. The discs were issued in a slipcase with a 128-page booklet containing a photograph of Debussy, an essay in French by Maurice Tassart, essays on the opera and its leitmotivs by Felix Aprahamian in English and German and synopses and libretti in all three languages.

In 1999, the album was reissued by EMI Records on CD (catalogue number CMS 5 67057 2) as part of their series of "Great Recordings of the Century". In 2014, the album was issued on CD by Warner Classics (catalogue number 667232 7).
