= Glotz =

Glotz is a surname. Notable people with the surname include:

- Gustave Glotz (1862–1935), French historian
- Michel Glotz (1931–2010), French record producer and impresario.
- Peter Glotz (1939–2005), German politician
