= Rita Gorr =

Belgian operatic mezzo-soprano singer

- Rita Gorr in Parsifal, Teatro alla Scala, Milan, 1960
- Born: Marguerite Geirnaert; February 18, 1926; Zelzate, near Ghent, Belgium
- Died: January 22, 2012 (aged 85); Dénia, Spain
- Occupation: Operatic mezzo-soprano
- Years active: 1946–2007
- Known for: Roles as Ortrud (Lohengrin), Amneris (Aida)
- Notable work: Studio recordings of Aida, Lohengrin, Samson et Dalila, Le Roi d'Ys
- Awards: First Prize, Verviers Competition (1946); First Prize, Lausanne Competition (1952)

Rita Gorr (18 February 1926 – 22 January 2012) was a Belgian operatic mezzo-soprano. She possessed a large, rich-toned voice and was an intense singing-actress, especially in dramatic roles such as Ortrud (Lohengrin) and Amneris (Aida), two of her greatest roles.

== Life and career ==
Gorr was born Marguerite Geirnaert into a working-class family in the industrial town of Zelzate, near Ghent, Belgium. After leaving school she worked as a nurse, where the family who employed her discovered her singing and paid for her first lessons.

After vocal studies in Ghent with Vina Bovy, and in Brussels with Jeanne Pacquot d'Assy and Germaine Hoerner, she won first prize at the vocal competition of Verviers in 1946, and made her professional debut at Antwerp as Fricka in Die Walküre the same year. She became a member of the Opéra national du Rhin in Strasbourg from 1949 to 1952. She won another first prize at the vocal competition of Lausanne in 1952. That year she made her Paris debuts at the Opéra-Comique as Charlotte in Massenet's Werther on 6 March 1952, and at the Paris Opéra on 31 October as Magdalena in Wagner's Die Meistersinger von Nürnberg; further roles in Paris included Dalila in Samson and Delilah by Saint-Saëns, Venus in Wagner's Tannhäuser, Mère Marie in the French premiere of Poulenc's Dialogues of the Carmelites (later in her career she sang Madame de Croissy), Bizet's Carmen, Geneviève in Debussy's Pelléas et Mélisande, Eboli in Verdi's Don Carlos, and Marguerite in Gounod's La Damnation de Faust.

Her career then became international in scope, with debuts at the Bayreuth Festival in 1958, the Royal Opera House in London in 1959, La Scala in Milan in 1960, and the Metropolitan Opera in New York City on 17 October 1962, as Amneris in Verdi's Aida. In four seasons at the Met, she also sang Santuzza in Mascagni's Cavalleria rusticana, Eboli, Azucena in Verdi's Il trovatore, Waltraute in Wagner's Götterdämmerung, and Dalila. She was a versatile artist, singing with equal success the French, Italian and German repertories. She enjoyed a very long career singing well into her 60s and 70s and her last role was as the Countess in Tchaikovsky's The Queen of Spades which she performed in the summer of 2007 in Ghent and Antwerp.

Gorr believed that 'trouser-roles' did not suit her; she did however, sing Lel in The Snow Maiden in 1955 in concert and the title role of Der Rosenkavalier by R. Strauss in 1958.

Although mainly active on stage, Gorr also sang occasionally in the concert hall, in works by Schumann, Duparc and Wagner; she recorded Mahler lieder.

Gorr can be heard in two of her greatest roles on recordings: Ortrud in Lohengrin in the 1965 studio performance under Erich Leinsdorf, opposite Sándor Kónya and Lucine Amara, as well as in the 1959 live performance from the Bayreuth Festival conducted by Lovro von Matačić; and Amneris in Aida in the 1961 studio performance under Georg Solti, opposite Leontyne Price and Jon Vickers. Other recorded roles include Dalila under Georges Prêtre in 1962 (studio), Charlotte in Werther under Jésus Etcheverry in 1964 (radio broadcast), Margared in Le roi d'Ys under André Cluytens in 1957 (studio), Mère Marie under Pierre Dervaux in 1958 (studio), Geneviève in Pelléas et Mélisande under Jean Fournet in 1953 (studio), Fricka in Die Walküre under Erich Leinsdorf in 1961 (studio), as well as more roles of The Ring of the Nibelung, Fricka in Das Rheingold and Die Walküre, Grimgerde in Die Walküre and the Third Norne in Götterdämmerung, all in live performances at the Bayreuth Festival in 1958 under Hans Knappertsbusch. She also recorded excerpts from Orphée et Eurydice (Orphée), Hérodiade (title role) and La Damnation de Faust, as well as recitals on Pathé.

Gorr can be heard in one of her rarest roles, in an excerpt from Cherubini's Médée (in French) with the Orchestre du Theatre National de l'Opera under Georges Prêtre on ASTX 130502 Pathe-Marconi, and in excerpts from two of her other Wagner roles — Isolde and Elisabeth — under André Cluytens on Testament SBT1256.

In her later life, Gorr made her home in Dénia, Spain. Oresko describes her as giving "the impression of regal grandeur and control by the solidness of her vocal production and a unique gift for instinctive authority".
