= Baron, Oise =

Baron
- Commune
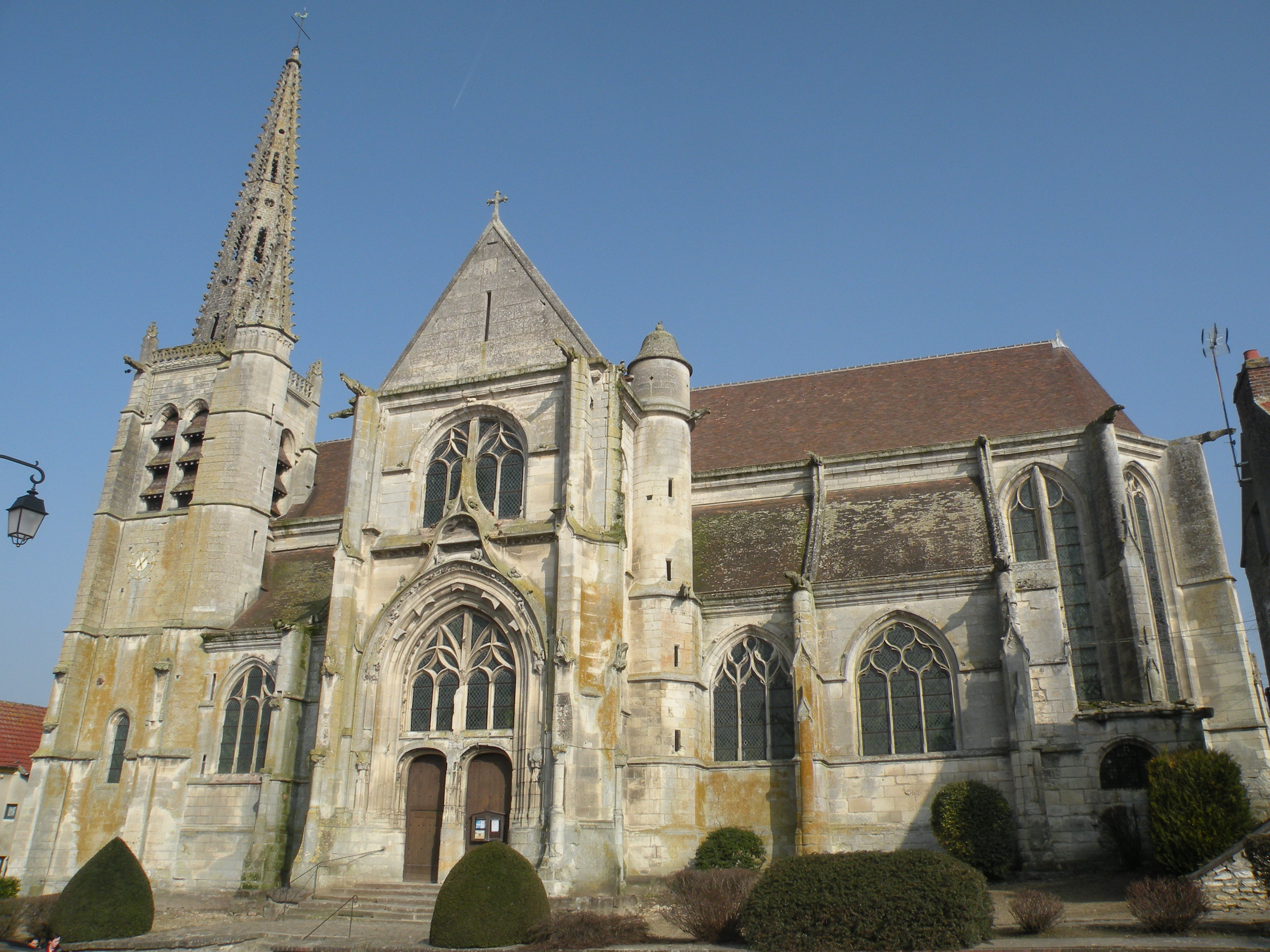
- Église Saint-Pierre-et-Saint-Paul de Baron

- Coat of arms
- Location of Baron
- Location within France Location within Hauts-de-France
- Coordinates: 49°10′26″N 2°43′49″E
- Country: France
- Region: Hauts-de-France
- Department: Oise
- Arrondissement: Senlis
- Canton: Nanteuil-le-Haudouin
- Intercommunality: Pays de Valois

Government
  - Mayor (2024–2026): Laurent Di Pizio
- Area^{1}: 21.47 km^{2} (8.29 sq mi)
- Elevation: 85 m (279 ft)
- Highest elevation: 151 m (495 ft)
- Lowest elevation: 63 m (207 ft)
- Population (2023): 729
  - Density: 34.0/km^{2} (87.9/sq mi)
- Time zone: UTC+01:00 (CET)
  - Summer (DST): UTC+02:00 (CEST)
- INSEE/Postal code: 60047 /60300
- ^{1} French Land Register data, which excludes lakes, ponds, glaciers > 1 km^{2} (0.386 sq mi or 247 acres) and river estuaries.

Baron (French pronunciation: [baʁɔ̃]) is a commune in the Oise department in northern France.

== History ==
On September 3, 1914, in the early stages of World War I, the estate of Manoir de Fontaines at Baron was the scene of composer Albéric Magnard shooting at invading German soldiers, killing one of them, and then being killed when they set the house on fire. At the time the event focused considerable public attention on Baron, Magnard being considered a French national hero for his act.

== Population ==
Historical population
Year	Pop.	±% p.a.
1968	597	—
1975	598	+0.02%
1982	715	+2.59%
1990	741	+0.45%
1999	777	+0.53%
2007	780	+0.05%
2012	789	+0.23%
2017	760	−0.75%
2023	729	−0.69%
Source: INSEE

== Notable people ==
- Albéric Magnard

== See also ==
- Communes of the Oise department
