= Two Pieces for Wind Quintet (Ropartz) =

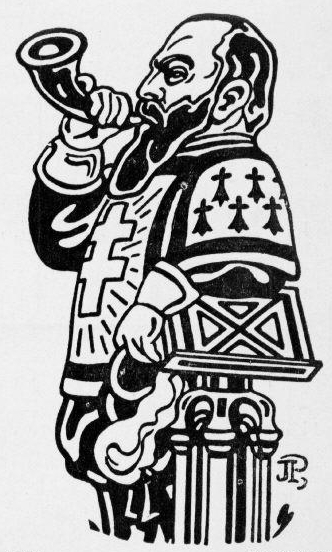
Portrait of Guy Ropartz by Jac Pohier

Guy Ropartz's Two Pieces for Wind Quintet (Deux pièces pour quintette à vent) is a composition for wind quintet composed in 1924, published in 1926 by Durand, and first performed in 1927. In 1978 it was recorded on LP by the Boehm Quintette for the Orion label, along with wind quintets by Irwin Bazelon and Franz Danzi. In a review of the recording in Fanfare, Joel Flegler described the work as "pleasantly innocuous, in that well-crafted, inconsequential way of every French wind work I've ever heard." The piece also appears on the 1998 CD, Woodwind: The Danish Wind Quintet.

== Structure ==
The work is scored for a quintet of flute, oboe, clarinet, bassoon and horn and is structured in two movements:

1. Lent (slow)
2. Vif (lively)
