= François Ruhlmann =

Belgian conductor

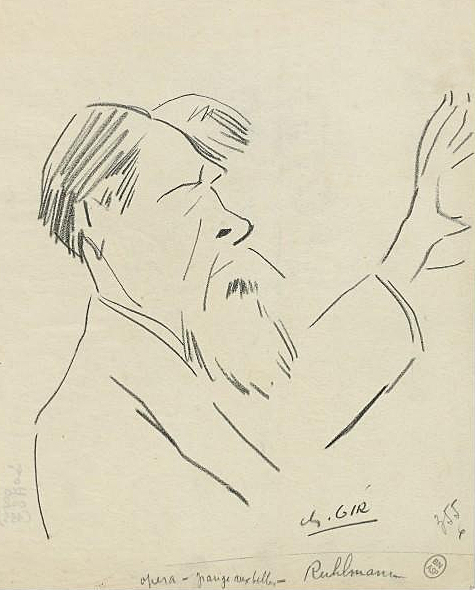
François Ruhlmann, caricature by Charles Gir

François Ruhlmann (11 January 1868 – 8 June 1948) was a Belgian conductor.

== Life and career ==
Born in Brussels, Ruhlmann was a pupil of Joseph Dupont in his native city. As a child he sang in the chorus at the Théâtre Royal de la Monnaie, and at 7 played the oboe in the orchestra.

Ruhlmann's first conducting engagement was at the Théâtre des Arts in Rouen in 1892. This was followed by further work in Liège and Antwerp, before a return to the Théâtre Royal de la Monnaie in 1898.

François Ruhlmann began his career at the Opéra-Comique, Paris on 6 September 1905 (with Carmen), then on the death of Alexandre Luigini became principal conductor in 1906 (retiring from the position in 1914). Although mobilised in 1914, he returned occasionally during the war to conduct.

From 1911 he conducted at the theatre of the Casino of Aix-les-Bains. Later he championed works by Dukas, Debussy, Fauré and Ravel at the Concerts Populaires in Brussels. In 1920 Ruhlmann tried to mediate in a dispute involving the musicians unions in Paris, although he sympathised with the players.

In 1919 he moved to the Palais Garnier, where he remained until 1938. He also taught conducting at the Schola Cantorum de Paris where one of his pupils was Achim Stoia.

He conducted many operatic premieres:

- Les Pêcheurs de Saint Jean (Widor) 1905
- Les Armaillis (Doret) 1906
- Le roi aveugle (February) 1906
- Ariane et Barbe-bleue (Dukas) 1907
- Le Chemineau (Leroux) 1907
- La Habanéra (Laparra) 1908
- The Snow Maiden (Rimsky-Korsakov) Paris premiere 1908
- Chiquito (Nouguès) 1909
- On ne badine pas avec l'amour (Erlanger) 1910
- Bérénice (Magnard) 1911
- L’Ancêtre (Saint-Saëns) Paris premiere 1911
- L'heure espagnole (Ravel) 1911
- Thérèse (Massenet) Paris premiere 1911
- La sorcière (Erlanger) 1912
- La Lépreuse (Lazzari) 1912
- La vida breve (Falla) Paris premiere 1913
- Mârouf, savetier du Caire (Rabaud) 1914
- Lorenzaccio (Moret) 1920
- Esther, princesse d'Israël (Mariotte) 1925

He was long associated with Pathé, for which he made many recordings, including six complete operas after 1910, including Rigoletto (Verdi) on 28 sides; Faust (Gounod) on 56 sides; and Le trouvère (Verdi), 1912 on 38 sides. He also conducted the 1911 Pathé recording of Carmen (54 sides).

François Ruhlmann died in Paris at age 80.
