= Michel Glotz =

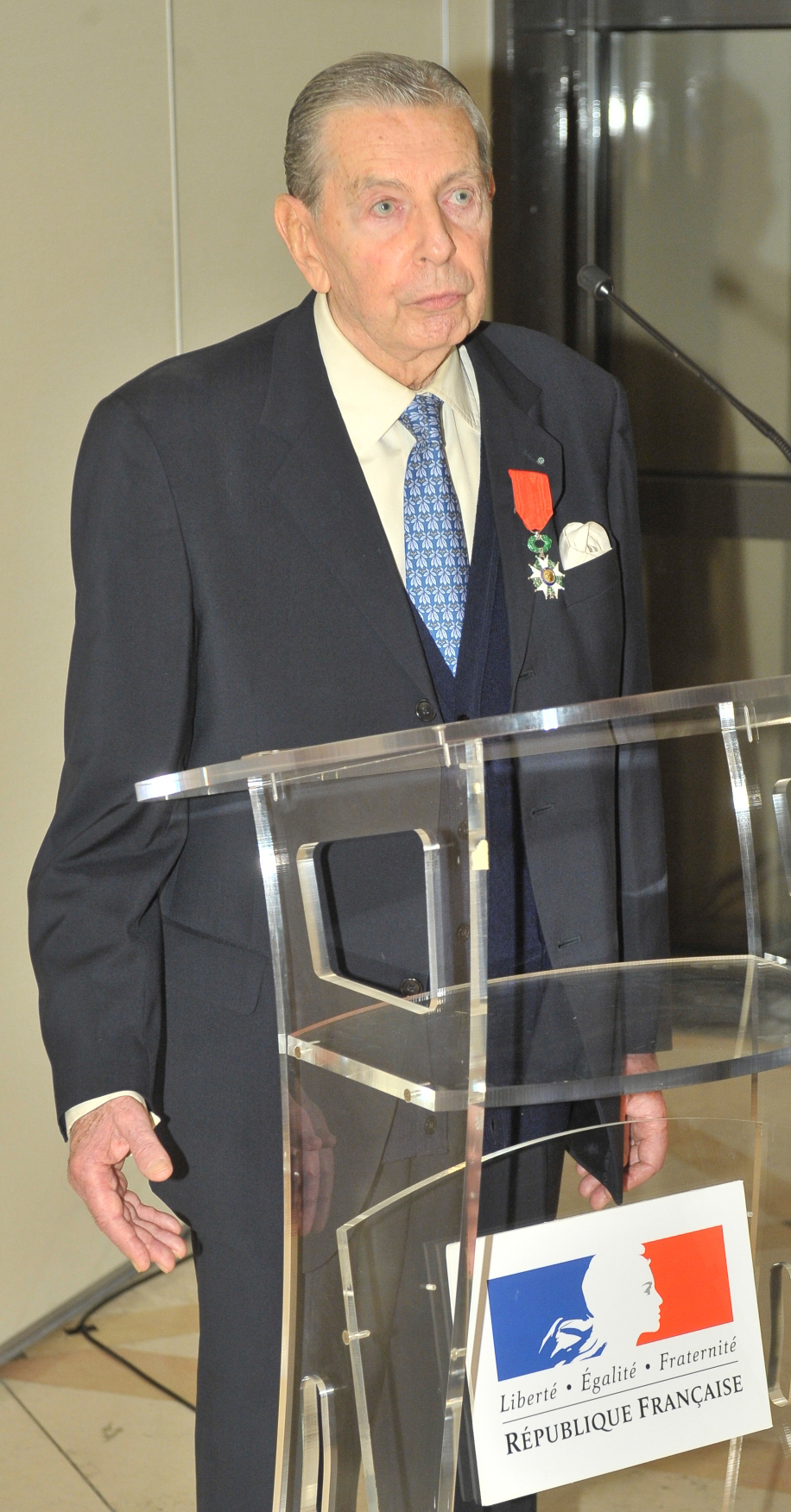
- Born: 1 February 1931
- Died: 15 February 2010 (aged 79)
- Occupations: classical music record producer impresario
- Awards: Grammy Awards winner

Michel Glotz (1 February 1931 – 15 February 2010) was a French classical music record producer and impresario. He was a student of Marguerite Long and accomplice of Francis Poulenc with whom he had a long correspondence. Artistic director of several record companies (EMI, Deutsche Grammophon, RCA Victor, Philips, Sony), he had more than a thousand discs recorded, including a hundred operas. Glotz won several Grammy Awards, including Beethoven's nine symphonies by Herbert von Karajan with the Berlin Philharmonic in 1978 and the "most beautiful opera of the year" award for Bizet's Carmen in 1984. In 1966, he and his collaborator Thérèse Darras founded a concert agency called Musicaglotz. He then turned his attention to the careers of legendary artists such as Maria Callas, Herbert von Karajan, Alain Lombard, Alexis Weissenberg. Glotz received the insignia of officier des Arts et Lettres, and chevalier de la Légion d'honneur en 2007. He died of a heart attack in 2010 at age 79.

== Artists represented ==
- Conductors: Serge Baudo, Sergiu Comissiona, James Conlon, Christoph Eschenbach, Patrick Fournillier, James Judd, Herbert von Karajan, Alain Lombard, Jesus Lopez Cobos, Kurt Masur, Seiji Ozawa, Georges Prêtre, Gennady Rozhdestvensky, Thomas Sanderling, Michel Tabachnik, Michael Tilson Thomas
- Pianists: Philippe Bianconi, Jean-Philippe Collard, Kun-Woo Paik, Ivo Pogorelich, Viktoria Postnikova, François Weigel, Alexis Weissenberg
- Violinists: Pierre Amoyal, Anne-Sophie Mutter, Tedi Papavrami
- Cellists: Natalia Gutman, Gary Hoffman, Yo-Yo Ma, Mstislav Rostropovich
- Sopranos: Montserrat Caballé, Maria Callas, Renée Fleming, Mirella Freni, Inva Mula, Leontyne Price, Katia Ricciarelli, Anna Tomowa-Sintow, Shirley Verrett
- Mezzo-sopranos: Agnes Baltsa, Jane Berbié, Teresa Berganza, Katherine Ciesinski, Susan Graham, Sophie Koch, Christa Ludwig, Marie-Ange Todorovitch, Rita Gorr
- Tenors: José Carreras, Laurence Dale, Placido Domingo, Chris Merritt, Kenneth Riegel, Michel Sénéchal
- Baritones: Gabriel Bacquier, Jean-Luc Chaignaud, Manfred Hemm, Nicolas Rivenq, Bryn Terfel
- Basses: Paata Burchuladze, Jean-Philippe Courtis, Ferruccio Furlanetto, Nicolai Ghiaurov, Tom Krause

== Recordings ==
=== 1969–1970 ===
- Franck's Symphony in D minor - Orchestre de Paris, Herbert von Karajan conductor, recorded in Paris, Salle Wagram, for EMI (077776474724), November 1969
- Tchaikovski's Piano Concerto n°1 op.23 - Alexis Weissenberg, piano, Orchestre de Paris, Herbert von Karajan conductor, recorded in Paris, Salle Wagram, for EMI (3C06302044), February 1970
- Brahms's Ouverture tragique op.81, Berlin Philharmonic, Herbert von Karajan conductor, recorded in the Jesus-Christus church of Berlin for EMI, September 1970
- Bruckner's Symphony n°4 (Romantic), Berlin Philharmonic, Herbert von Karajan conductor, recorded in the Jesus-Christus church of Berlin for EMI, September 1970
- Bruckner's Symphony n°7, Berlin Philharmonic, Herbert von Karajan conductor, recorded in the Jesus-Christus church of Berlin for EMI, September 1970
- Mozart's Symphony n°38 KV504, Berlin Philharmonic, Herbert von Karajan conductor, recorded at the Jesus-Christus church of Berlin for EMI, September 1970
- Mozart' Symphony n°39 KV543, Berlin Philharmonic, Herbert von Karajan conductor, recorded at the Jesus-Christus church of Berlin for EMI, September 1970
- Mozart's Symphony n°40 KV550, Berlin Philharmonic, Herbert von Karajan conductor, recorded at the Jesus-Christus church of Berlin for EMI, September 1970
- Mozart' Symphony n°41 KV551, Berlin Philharmonic, Herbert von Karajan conductor, recorded at the Jesus-Christus church of Berlin for EMI, September 1970

=== 1971 ===
- Ravel's Boléro - Orchestre de Paris, Herbert von Karajan conductor, recorded in Paris, Salle Wagram, for EMI (724356945920), June 1971
- Ravel's Alborada del gracioso - Orchestre de Paris, Herbert von Karajan conductor, recorded in Paris, Salle Wagram, for EMI, June 1971
- Ravel's La Valse - Orchestre de Paris, Herbert von Karajan conductor, recorded in Paris, Salle Wagram for EMI, June 1971
- Joseph Haydn: Symphony n°83 - Berlin Philharmonic, Herbert von Karajan conductor, recorded at the French church of Saint-Maurice for EMI, August 1971
- Haydn: Symphony n°101 - Berlin Philharmonic, Herbert von Karajan conductor, recorded at the French church of Saint-Maurice for EMI, August 1971
- Ravel's Rapsodie espagnole, Le Tombeau de Couperin - Orchestre de Paris, Herbert von Karajan conductor, recorded in Paris, Salle Wagram for EMI, June 1971
- Wolfgang Amadeus Mozart: Symphonie concertante KV 297b (Karl Steins, Herbert Stahr, Norbert Hauptmann, Manfred Braun), Berlin Philharmonic, Herbert von Karajan conductor, recorded at the French church of Saint-Maurice for EMI, August 1971
- Mozart's Concerto pour flûte (James Galway) and harp (Fritz Helmis) KV299, Berlin Philharmonic, Herbert von Karajan conductor, recorded at the French church of Saint-Maurice for EMI, August 1971
- Mozart's Concerto pour flûte (Andreas Blau) KV313, Berlin Philharmonic, Herbert von Karajan conductor, recorded at the French church of Saint-Maurice for EMI, August 1971
- Mozart's Oboe Concerto (Lothar Koch) KV314, Berlin Philharmonic, Herbert von Karajan conductor, recorded at the French church of Saint-Maurice for EMI, August 1971
- Mozart's Clarinet Concerto (Karl Leister) KV622, Berlin Philharmonic, Herbert von Karajan conductor, recorded at the French church of Saint-Maurice for EMI, August 1971
- Mozart's Bassoon Concerto (Günther Piesk) KV191, Berlin Philharmonic, Herbert von Karajan conductor, recorded at the French church of Saint-Maurice for EMI, August 1971
- Tchaikovski's Symphony n°4 op.36 - Berlin Philharmonic, Herbert von Karajan conductor, recorded at the Jesus-Christus Kirche of Berlin for EMI (Warner Classics B000NPCMJ4), September 1971
- Tchaikovski's Symphony n°5 op.64 - Berlin Philharmonic, Herbert von Karajan conductor, recorded at thea Jesus-Christus Kirche of Berlin for EMI (Warner Classics B000NPCMJ4), September 1971
- Tchaïkovski: Symphony n°6 op.74 (Pathétique) - Berlin Philharmonic, Herbert von Karajan conductor, recorded at the Jesus-Christus Kirche of Berlin for EMI (Warner Classics B000NPCMJ4), September 1971

=== 1972–1973 ===
- Wagner's Tristan und Isolde (Jon Vickers, Helga Dernesch, Christa Ludwig, Peter Schreier, Karl Ridderbusch) - Chœur de l'Opéra allemand de Berlin, Berlin Philharmonic, Herbert von Karajan conductor, recorded at the Jesus-Christus Kirche of Berlin for EMI (5099902885827), January 1972
- Franck's Symphonic Variations - Alexis Weissenberg, piano, Benck's Variations Symphoniques - Alexis Weissenberg, piano, Berliner Philharmonie, Herbert von Karajan conductor, recorded at the Jesus-Christus Kirche of Berlin for EMI (077776474724), September 1972
- Rachmaninov's Piano Concerto n°2 - Alexis Weissenberg, piano, Berlin Philharmonic, Herbert von Karajan conductor, recorded at the Jesus-Christus Kirche of Berlin for EMI (B000246J5Y), September 1972
- Strauss' Sinfonia domestica op.53 - Berlin Philharmonic, Herbert von Karajan conductor, recorded in Paris, Salle Wagram, for EMI, June 1973

=== 1974 ===
- Bach's Mass in B minor (BWV232) - Gundula Janowitz, Christa Ludwig, Peter Schreier, Robert Kerns, Karl Ridderbusch, Wiener Singverein) - Berlin Philharmonic, Herbert von Karajan conductor, recorded at the Berliner Philharmonie for Deutsche Grammophon (415622), 1974
- Bartók's Concerto for Orchestra Sz116 - Berlin Philharmonic, Herbert von Karajan conductor, recorded at the Berliner Philharmonie for EMI, May 1974
- Beethoven's Piano Concerto n°5 op.58 (Emperor) (Alexis Weissenberg) - Berlin Philharmonic, Herbert von Karajan conductor, recorded at the Berliner Philharmonie for EMI, May 1974
- Hummel's Concerto pour trompette (Maurice André) - Berlin Philharmonic, Herbert von Karajan conductor, recorded at the Berliner Philharmonie for EMI (Warner Classics B006LL02GE), in May 1974
- Leopold Mozart: Trumpet Concerto (Maurice André) - Berlin Philharmonic, Herbert von Karajan conductor, recorded at the Berliner Philharmonie for EMI (Warner Classics B006LL02GE), May 1974
- Georg Philipp Telemann: Trumpet Concerto (Maurice André) - Berlin Philharmonic, Herbert von Karajan conductor, recorded at the Berliner Philharmonie for EMI (Warner Classics B006LL02GE), May 1974
- Antonio Vivaldi: Trumpet Concerto (Maurice André) - Berlin Philharmonic, Herbert von Karajan conductor, recorded at the Berliner Philharmonie for EMI (Warner Classics B006LL02GE), May 1974
- Beethoven's: Piano Concerto n°4 op.58, Alexis Weissenberg - Berlin Philharmonic, Herbert von Karajan conductor, recorded at the Berliner Philharmonie for EMI, September 1974
- Strauss' Une vie de héros op.40 - Berlin Philharmonic, Herbert von Karajan conductor, recorded at the Berliner Philharmonie for EMI, October 1974
- Strauss' Don Quixote op.35 - Mstislav Rostropovich, cello, Berlin Philharmonic, Herbert von Karajan conductor, recorded at the Berliner Philharmonie for EMI, September and October 1974
- Wagner's Preludes of Tristan and Isolde, Lohengrin, Parsifal, Vaisseau fantôme, Maîtres chanteurs de Nürnberg, Tannhäuser: Berlin Philharmonic, Herbert von Karajan conductor, recorded at the Berliner Philharmonie for EMI, October 1974

=== 1975 ===
- Joseph Haydn: Symphony n°104 - Berlin Philharmonic, Herbert von Karajan conductor, recorded at the Berliner Philharmonie for EMI, January 1975
- Schubert's Symphony n°8 (Inachevée) - Berlin Philharmonic, Herbert von Karajan conductor, recorded at the Berliner Philharmonie for EMI, January 1975
- Mozart's Requiem (Anna Tomowa-Sintow, Agnes Baltsa, Werner Krenn, José van Dam) - Wiener Singverein, Berlin Philharmonic, Herbert von Karajan conductor, recorded at the Berliner Philharmonie for Deutsche Grammophon (4198672), September 1975
- A Vienne au temps des Strauss: Le Beau Danube bleu op.314, Valse de l'Empereur op.437, Annen-Polka op.117, Marche de Radetzky op.229, Ouverture de la Chauve-Souris, Tritsch-Tratsch Polka op.214, Ouverture du Baron Tzigane, Mouvement perpétuel op.257 - Berlin Philharmonic, Herbert von Karajan conductor, recorded at the Berliner Philharmonie for Deutsche Grammophon (139014), December 1975

=== 1976 ===
- Ludwig van Beethoven: Piano Concerto n°3 op.37, Alexis Weissenberg - Berlin Philharmonic, Herbert von Karajan conductor, recorded at the Berliner Philharmonie for EMI, September 1976
- Johannes Brahms: Variations sur un thème de Haydn op.56a - Berlin Philharmonic, Herbert von Karajan conductor, recorded at the Berliner Philharmonie for EMI, September and October 1976
- Jean Sibelius' Symphony n°4 op.63 - Berlin Philharmonic, Herbert von Karajan conductor, recorded at the Berliner Philharmonie for EMI, September and October 1976
- Sibelius' Symphony n°5 op.82 - Berlin Philharmonic, Herbert von Karajan conductor, recorded at the Berliner Philharmonie for EMI, September and October 1976
- Sibelius: En Saga op.9 - Berlin Philharmonic, Herbert von Karajan conductor, recorded at the Berliner Philharmonie for EMI, December 1976
- Sibelius' Lemminkäinen Suite op.22 - Berlin Philharmonic, Herbert von Karajan conductor, recorded at the Berliner Philharmonie for EMI, December 1976
- Sibelius' Finlandia op.26 - Berlin Philharmonic, Herbert von Karajan conductor, recorded at the Berliner Philharmonie for EMI, December 1976
- Sibelius' Tapiola op.112 - Berlin Philharmonic, Herbert von Karajan conductor, recorded at the Berliner Philharmonie for EMI, December 1976
- Tchaikovski's Piano Concerto n°1 op.23 - Lazar Berman, piano, Berlin Philharmonic, Herbert von Karajan conductor, recorded at the Berliner Philharmonie for Deutsche Grammophon (2530677) in 1976

=== 1977–1978 ===
- Beethoven's Symphony n°1 op.21 - Berlin Philharmonic, Herbert von Karajan conductor, recorded at the Berliner Philharmonie for Deutsche Grammophon (2563796) in 1977
- Beethoven's Symphony n°2 op.36 - Berlin Philharmonic, Herbert von Karajan conductor, recorded at the Berliner Philharmonie for Deutsche Grammophon (2563796) in 1977
- Beethoven's Symphony n°3 op.55 - Berlin Philharmonic, Herbert von Karajan conductor, recorded at the Berliner Philharmonie for Deutsche Grammophon (2563797) in 1977
- Beethoven's Symphony n°4 op.60 - Berlin Philharmonic, Herbert von Karajan conductor, recorded at the Berliner Philharmonie for Deutsche Grammophon (2563799) en 1977
- Beethoven's Symphony n°5 op.67 - Berlin Philharmonic, Herbert von Karajan conductor, recorded at the Berliner Philharmonie for Deutsche Grammophon (2563799) in 1977
- Beethoven's Symphony n°6 op.68 - Berlin Philharmonic, Herbert von Karajan conductor, recorded at the Berliner Philharmonie for Deutsche Grammophon (2563800) in 1977
- Beethoven's Symphony n°7 op.92 - Berlin Philharmonic, Herbert von Karajan conductor, recorded at the Berliner Philharmonie for Deutsche Grammophon (2563801) in 1977
- Beethoven: Symphony n°8 op.93 - Berlin Philharmonic, Herbert von Karajan conductor, recorded at the Berliner Philharmonie for Deutsche Grammophon (2563802) in 1977
- Beethoven: Symphony n°9 op.125 - Anna Tomowa-Sintow, Agnes Baltsa, Peter Schreier, José van Dam, Wiener Singverein) - Berlin Philharmonic, Herbert von Karajan conductor, recorded at the Berliner Philharmonie for Deutsche Grammophon (2563802) in 1977
- Beethoven's Piano Concerto n°1 op.15 (Alexis Weissenberg) - Berlin Philharmonic, Herbert von Karajan conductor, recorded at the Berliner Philharmonie for EMI, September 1977
- Beethoven's Piano Concerto n°2 op.19 Alexis Weissenberg - Berlin Philharmonic, Herbert von Karajan conductor, recorded at the Berliner Philharmonie for EMI, September 1977
- Debussy's La Mer - Berlin Philharmonic, Herbert von Karajan conductor, recorded at the Berliner Philharmonie for EMI, June 1977
- Debussy's Prélude à l'après-midi d'un faune - Berlin Philharmonic, Herbert von Karajan conductor, recorded at the Berliner Philharmonie for EMI, June 1977
- Bedřich Smetana: Ma Patrie - Berlin Philharmonic, Herbert von Karajan conductor, recorded at the Berliner Philharmonie for EMI, January 1977
- Schubert's Symphony n°9 D944 - Berlin Philharmonic, Herbert von Karajan conductor, recorded at the Berliner Philharmonie for EMI, June 1977
- Schubert: Symphony n°1 D082 - Berlin Philharmonic, Herbert von Karajan conductor, recorded at the Berliner Philharmonie for EMI, September 1977 and January 1978
- Schubert: Symphony n°2 D125 - Berlin Philharmonic, Herbert von Karajan conductor, recorded at the Berliner Philharmonie for EMI, September 1977 and January 1978
- Schubert: Symphony n°3 D200 - Berlin Philharmonic, Herbert von Karajan conductor, recorded at the Berliner Philharmonie for EMI, September 1977 and January 1978
- Schubert: Symphony n°4 D417 - Berlin Philharmonic, Herbert von Karajan conductor, recorded at the Berliner Philharmonie for EMI, September 1977 and January 1978
- Schubert: Symphony n°5 D485 - Berlin Philharmonic, Herbert von Karajan conductor, recorded at the Berliner Philharmonie for EMI, September 1977 and January 1978
- Schubert: Symphony n°6 D589 - Berlin Philharmonic, Herbert von Karajan conductor, recorded at the Berliner Philharmonie for EMI, September 1977 and January 1978
- Schubert's Rosamunde D797 - Berlin Philharmonic, Herbert von Karajan conductor, recorded at the Berliner Philharmonie for EMI, January 1978
- Debussy's Pelléas and Mélisande (Richard Stilwell, Frederica von Stade, José van Dam, Ruggero Raimondi, Nadine Denize)- Choeur de l'Opéra allemand de Berlin, Berlin Philharmonic, Herbert von Karajan conductor, recorded at the Berliner Philharmonie for EMI (724356705722), December 1978

=== 1979 ===
- Hector Berlioz: Marche hongroise - Berlin Philharmonic, Herbert von Karajan conductor, recorded at the Berliner Philharmonie for EMI (724356945920), January 1979
- Bizet's L'Arlésienne - Berlin Philharmonic, Herbert von Karajan conductor, recorded at the Berliner Philharmonie for EMI (724356945920), January 1979
- Chabrier's: España - Berlin Philharmonic, Herbert von Karajan conductor, recorded at the Berliner Philharmonie for EMI (724356945920), January 1979
- Antonin Dvořák: Danse slave n°8 op.46 - Berlin Philharmonic, Herbert von Karajan conductor, recorded at the Berliner Philharmonie for EMI, January 1979
- Dvořák: Symphony n°8 op.88 - Berlin Philharmonic, Herbert von Karajan conductor, recorded at the Berliner Philharmonie for EMI, January 1979
- Dvořák's: Symphony n°9 op.95 - Berlin Philharmonic, Herbert von Karajan conductor, recorded at the Berliner Philharmonie for EMI, January 1979
- Charles Gounod: Ballet de Faust - Berlin Philharmonic, Herbert von Karajan conductor, recorded at the Berliner Philharmonie for EMI (724356945920), January 1979
- Smetana's La Moldau - Berlin Philharmonic, Herbert von Karajan conductor, recorded at the Berliner Philharmonie for EMI (724356945920), January 1979

=== 1980–1981 ===
- Sibelius: Symphony n°2 op.43 - Berlin Philharmonic, Herbert von Karajan conductor, recorded at the Berliner Philharmonie for EMI, November 1980
- Jean Sibelius: Symphony n°1 op.39 - Berlin Philharmonic, Herbert von Karajan conductor, recorded at the Berliner Philharmonie for EMI, January 1981
- Sibelius: Symphonies n°6 op.104 - Berlin Philharmonic, Herbert von Karajan conductor, recorded at the Berliner Philharmonie for EMI, January 1981
- Sibelius' Karelia Suite op.11, Valse Triste op.44 - Berlin Philharmonic, Herbert von Karajan conductor, recorded at the Berliner Philharmonie for EMI (724356945920), January 1981
- Weber's Operture of Der Freischütz - Berlin Philharmonic, Herbert von Karajan conductor, recorded at the Berliner Philharmonie for EMI (724356945920), January 1981

=== 1985–1987 ===
- Mozart's Don Giovanni (Samuel Ramey, Anna Tomowa-Sintow, Agnes Baltsa, Kathleen Battle, Ferruccio Furlanetto, Alexander Malta, Paata Burchuladze) - Choeur de l'Opéra allemande de Berlin Berlin Philharmonic, Herbert von Karajan conductor, recorded at the Berliner Philharmonie for Deutsche Grammophon (419181), January 1985
- Tchaikovski's Symphony n°4 op.36 - Vienna Philharmonic, Herbert von Karajan conductor, recorded for Deutsche Grammophon (4153482), in 1985
- Verdi's Requiem (Agnes Baltsa, José Carreras, José van Dam) - Choeur de l'Opéra de Vienne, Choeur de l'Opéra National de Sofia, Vienna Philharmonic, Herbert von Karajan conductor, recorded for Deutsche Grammophon (415092-415093), in 1985
- Borodin's Prince Igor (Nicolai Ghiaurov, Stefka Evstatieva, Nicola Ghiuselev, Kaludi Kaludov, Alexandrina Miltcheva, Boris Martinovich) - Choeur de l'Opéra National de Bulgarie, Sofia Festival Orchestra, Emil Tchakarov conductor, recorded at the Palais des Congrès de Sofia for Sony (B0000026PJ) from 14 to 20 July 1987

=== 1991 ===
- Moussorgski's Boris Godunov (Nicolaï Ghiaurov, Dimiter Petkov, Michail Svetlev, Stefka Mineva, Mincho Popov - Choeur de l'Opéra National de Bulgarie, Sofia Festival Orchestra, Emil Tchakarov conductor, recorded at the Palais des Congrès de Sofia for Sony (B0000026ZCJ) in 1991
- Tchaikovski's Eugene Onegin Yuri Mazurok, Anna Tomowa-Sintow, Nicolai Gedda, Nicola Ghiuselev, Rossitza Troeva-Mircheva, Margarita Lilowa - Chœur de l'Opéra National de Bulgarie, Sofia Festival Orchestra, Emil Tchakarov director, recorded at the Palais des Congrès de Sofia for Sony (455392J) in 1991
- Verdi's Il Trovatore (Aprile Millo, Dolora Zajick, Vladimir Chernov, James Morris, Placido Domingo) - Metropolitan Opera Orchestra and Chorus, James Levine director, recorded at the Manhattan Center for Sony (B0000027UA) from 6 to 18 May 1991
- Verdi's Luisa Miller (Aprile Millo, Florence Quivar, Vladimir Chernov, Paul Plishka, Jan-Hendrik Rootering, Placido Domingo) - Metropolitan Opera Orchestra and Chorus, James Levine conductor, recorded for Sony (BO1AMWKJO2) at the Manhattan Center from 2 to 18 May 1991
- Puccini' s La Fanciulla del West (Mara Zampieri, Juan Pons, Placido Domingo) - Choir and Orchestra of the Milan Scala, Lorin Maazel conducting, recorded for Sony ((B00027LD66) from 27 January to 7 February 1991

=== 1992–1994 ===
- Puccini's Manon Lescaut (Nina Rautio, Gino Quilico, Peter Dvorský) - Choir and Orchestra of the Milan Scala, Lorin Maazel] conducting, recorded for Sony ((B013KPIW3S) at La Scala of Milan from 11 to 15 February 1992
- Verdi's Don Carlos (Aprile Millo, Michael Sylvester, Ferruccio Furlanetto, Kathleen Battle, Samuel Ramey) - Metropolitan Opera Orchestra and Chorus, James Levine conducting, recorded for Sony (B0000028MN) at the Manhattan Center from 20 to 24 May 1992
- Mozart's Symphony n°33 KV319 - Vienna Philharmonic, Carlos Kleiber conducting, recorded for Memories (B0013345VI), in 1994
- Mozart's Symphony n°36 KV425 (Linz) - Vienna Philharmonic, Carlos Kleiber conductor, recorded for Memories (B0013345VI), in 1994
- Brahms' Symphony n°2 op.73 - Vienna Philharmonic, Carlos Kleiber conductor, Recorded for Memories (B0013345VI), in 1994
- Strauss' Ein Heldenleben op.40 - Vienna Philharmonic, Carlos Kleiber conductor, recorded for Memories (B0013345VI), in 1994
- Massenet's Hérodiade (Placido Domingo, Renée Fleming, Dolora Zajick, Juan Pons - San Francisco Opera Orchestra and Chorus, Valery Gergiev conductor, recorded for Sony (B0000029N2) from 5 to 15 November 1994

== Bibliography ==
- Révéler les dieux (series "Un homme et son métier", letter-preface from Herbert von Karajan), Éditions Robert Laffont Paris, 1981 ISBN 2-221-00611-9
- La Note bleue (series "Recueil de souvenirs"), JC Lattès, 2002 ISBN 2-7096-2007-3
- Marjorie Tallchief (series "Danseurs de notre temps"), Éditions Robert Laffont, Paris, 1955
- George Skibine (series "Danseurs de notre temps"), Éditions Robert Laffont, Paris, 1955
- Serge Golovine (series "Danseurs de notre temps"), Éditions Robert Laffont, Paris, 1955
