= Louis Tiercelin =

French writer, poet and playwright

Louis Tiercelin (Rennes, 1846 – Paramé, 1915), was a French writer, poet and playwright associated with the Breton cultural renaissance of the early 20th century.

He debuted at the age of 18 with two plays performed at the theatre of Rennes. He founded and edited for a period the newspaper La Jeunesse (Youth). In 1889 he published with Guy Ropartz Le Parnasse breton contemporain (The Modern Breton Parnassus), an anthology of Breton poetry of the 2nd half of the nineteenth century. In October 1890, he founded the Revue L’Hermine (Ermine Revue), the ermine being the symbol of Brittany. He led this for 22 years and brought together many Breton poets and writers, including François-Marie Luzel, Anatole Le Braz and Charles Le Goffic.
