= Charles Le Goffic =

Breton poet, novelist and historian

- Eostik ar Garantez
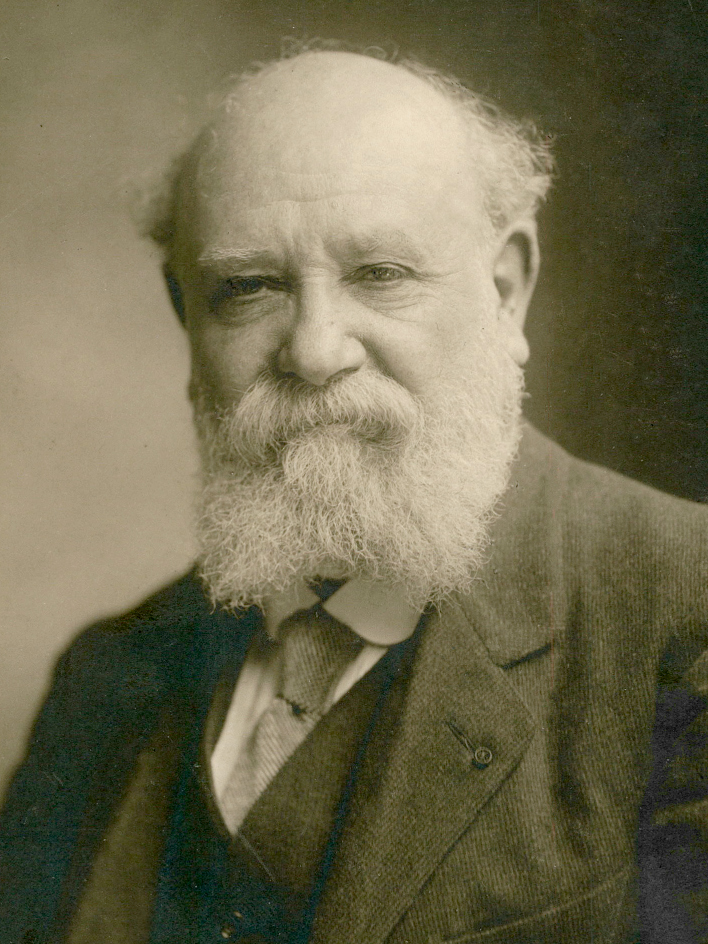
- Le Goffic photographed by Nadar c. 1910
- Born: Charles Le Goffic; 14 July 1863 – Lannion
- Died: 12 February 1932; Lannion
- Occupations: Poet; Writer

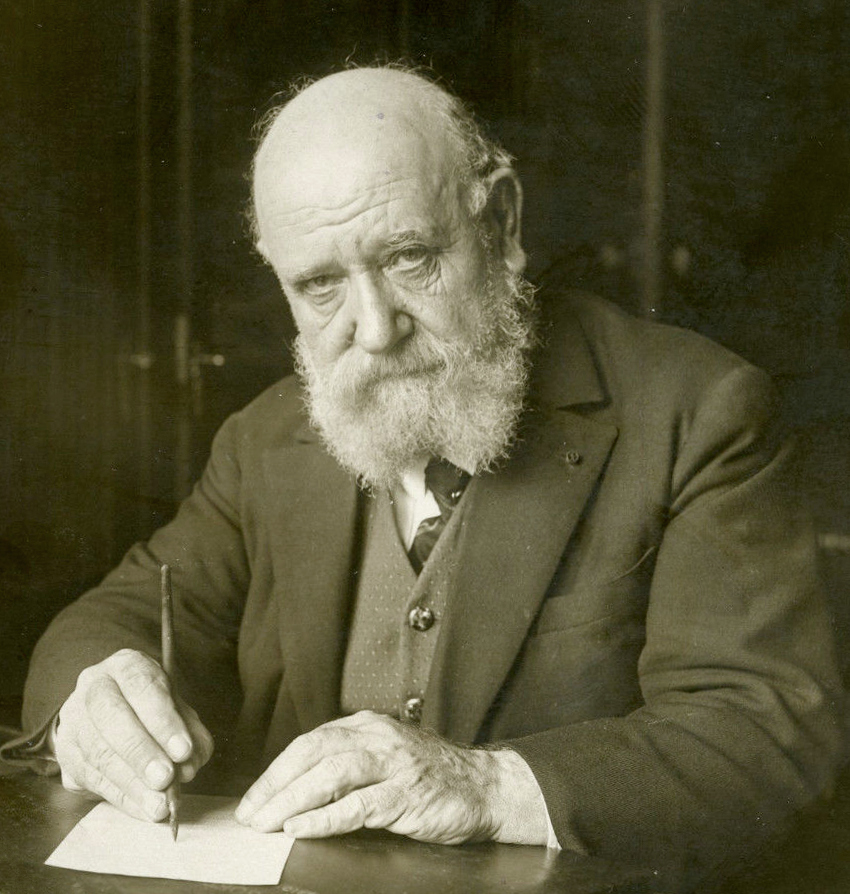
Le Goffic photographed by Georges Devred in 1931

Charles Le Goffic (14 July 1863 – 12 February 1932) was a Breton poet, novelist and historian whose influence was especially strong in his native Brittany. He was a member of the Académie française.

== Biography ==
Born in Lannion, northern Brittany, his childhood was spent with his nurse, either in Perros-Guirec, or in Trégastel. In October 1888, he married Julie Fleury. Following a legal judgement in his favour he bought a farm at Run-Rouz in Trégastel. He worked as a teacher in Gap, Évreux, Nevers and in Le Havre. In 1886, he founded with Maurice Barrès and Raymond de Tailhède the literary review Les Chroniques. Goffic wrote widely about aspects of Breton and broader Celtic cultural identity, emphasising the importance of local traditions and cultural continuity. His short stories Passions Celtes (1910) were widely influential on the Breton cultural renaissance. One of them was dramatised by Le Goffic at the request of Guy Ropartz for the libretto of his opera Le Pays.

Politically close to Charles Maurras, he collaborated on the Revue d'Action française (1899), which later became L'Action française (1908). Although a convinced republican, his militant regionalism and his traditionalist ideals led him to support the "Maurrassisme" project to restore the monarchy, as his letter published in L'Enquête sur la monarchie (1900) testifies.

Goffic was elected member of the Académie française in 1930.

In 1895 he introduced the Great Highland Bagpipe to Brittany.

He is interred in the enclosure of the church of the borough of Trégastel, with his wife and their daughter, who died at the age of 17.

== Bibliography ==
- Nous autres (1879)
- Velléda (1882)
- Les Mémoires de Saint-Simon, avec Jules Tellier (1888)
- Amour Breton, poésie (1889)
- Les Romanciers d'aujourd'hui (1890)
- Chansons bretonnes (1891)
- Le Crucifié de Kéraliès (1892) [1]
- Passé l'amour (1894)
- Contes de l'Assomption (1895)
- Sur la côte (1896)
- La Payse (1897)
- Morgane (1888)
- Le Bois dormant, poésie (1900)
- Le Pardon de la reine Anne, poésie (1901)
- L'âme bretonne (4 vol., 1902–1922)
- Les Métiers pittoresques (1903)
- L'Erreur de Florence (1903)
- Les Sept-Iles (1904)
- Les Calvaires Bretons (1904)
- Les Bonnets rouges (1906)
- La Cigarière (1907)
- Passions celtes (1909)
- La double confession (1909)
- La littérature française au XIXe siècle (1909)
- Ventôse. Le pays (1910)
- Fêtes et coutumes populaires (1911)
- Racine (2 vol., 1912)
- Le Pirate de l'île Lern (1913)
- Monsieur Ernest Renan dans la Basse-Bretagne (1913)
- Poésies complètes (1913)
- Dixmude (1915)
- Bourguignottes et pompons rouges (1916)
- Les Marais de Saint-Gond (1917)
- Steenstraëte (1917)
- Sans nouvelles (1917)
- La guerre qui passe (1918)
- Saint-Georges et Nieuport (1919)
- Les Trois Maréchaux (1919)
- Bretagne (1920)
- La littérature française aux XIXe et XXe siècles (1920)
- La Marne en feu (1921)
- L'Abbesse de Guérande (1921)
- Chez les Jean Gouin (1921)
- L'Odyssée de Jean Chevanton (1921)
- L'Illustre Bobinet (1922)
- Croc d'argent (1922)
- Le Treizain de la nostalgie et du déchirement. La visite nocturne, poésies (1926)
- Madame Ruguellou (1927)
- La Tour d'Auvergne (1928)
- Anthologie des poètes de la mer (1929)
- Mes entretiens avec Foch, suivis d'un entretien avec le général Weygand (1929)
- La Chouannerie : Blancs contre Bleus (1790–1800) (1931)
- Poésies complètes (2 vol., 1931)
- Ombres lyriques et romanesques (1933)
