= Nadine Denize =

French mezzo-soprano (born 1943)

Nadine Denize (born 6 November 1943) is a French mezzo-soprano.

== Career ==
Born in Rouen, Denize studied at the conservatoire à rayonnement régional de Rouen, in Marie-Louise Christol's class and entered the Conservatoire de Paris (rue de Madrid) in Camille Maurane's class at age eighteen. She won a First prize and was hired by the Paris opera. She made her debut as Cassandra in Berlioz's Les Troyens and Marguerite in La Damnation de Faust.

She was also a Wagnerian singer.

== Discography ==
- Mors et vita by Charles Gounod with the orchestre du Capitole de Toulouse directed by Michel Plasson
- Pelléas et Mélisande by Claude Debussy with the Berlin Philharmonic directed by Herbert von Karajan 1978 EMI
- Guercoeur by Alberic Magnard with the orchestre du Capitole de Toulouse directed by Michel Plasson 1987 EMI

== See also ==
- Debussy: Pelléas et Mélisande (Herbert von Karajan recording)
