= Guy Ropartz =

French composer and conductor

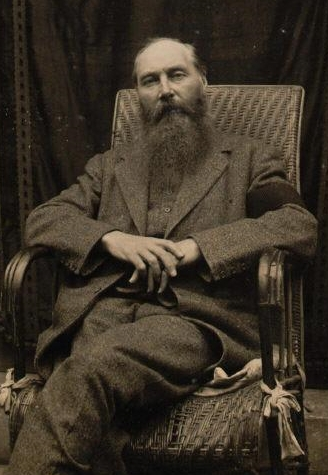
Guy Ropartz (date unknown)

Joseph Guy Marie Ropartz (French: [ʁɔpaʁts]; 15 June 1864 – 22 November 1955) was a French composer and conductor. His compositions included five symphonies, three violin sonatas, cello sonatas, six string quartets, a piano trio and string trio (both in A minor), stage works, a number of choral works and other music, often alluding to his Breton heritage. Ropartz also published poetry.

== Life ==
Ropartz was born in Guingamp, Côtes-d'Armor, Brittany. He studied initially at Rennes. In 1885 he entered the Conservatoire de Paris, studying under Théodore Dubois, then Jules Massenet, where he became a close friend of the young Georges Enesco. He later studied the organ under César Franck.

He was appointed director of the Nancy Conservatory (at the time a branch of the Paris Conservatory) from 1894 to 1919, where he established classes in viola in 1894, trumpet in 1895, harp and organ in 1897, then trombone in 1900. He also founded the season of symphonic concerts with the newly created orchestra of the Conservatory, ancestor of the Orchestre symphonique et lyrique de Nancy.

Ropartz was associated with the Breton cultural renaissance of the era, setting to music the words of Breton writers such as Anatole Le Braz and Charles Le Goffic. He also supported Breton regional autonomy, joining the Breton Regionalist Union in 1898. He also was the Honorary President of the Association des Compositeurs Bretons that was founded in 1912.

In the early stages of World War I his friend and fellow composer Albéric Magnard was killed defending his house from German invaders. His house was destroyed, along with several musical manuscripts. Ropartz reconstituted from memory the orchestration of Magnard's opera Guercoeur, which had been lost in the fire.

From 1919 to 1929 Ropartz was director of the Strasbourg Conservatory, which he moved into the building of the former parliament of Alsace-Lorraine. At the same time he undertook the direction of the Philharmonic Orchestra of Strasbourg, influencing young students like Charles Munch. Elected in 1949 as a member of the Académie des Beaux-Arts (5th section, musical composition), he succeeded Georges Hüe.

Ropartz also served as a juror with Florence Meyer Blumenthal in awarding the Prix Blumenthal, a grant given between 1919 and 1954 to young French painters, sculptors, decorators, engravers, writers, and musicians.

He retired in 1929 and withdrew to his manor in Lanloup, Brittany. He continued to compose until 1953, when he became blind. He died in Lanloup in 1955.

== Style ==
His musical style was influenced by Claude Debussy and César Franck. However he self-identified as a Celtic Breton, writing that he was the son of a country "where the goblins populate the moor and dance by the moony nights around the menhirs; where the fairies and the enchanters - Viviane and Merlin - have as a field the forest of Brocéliande; where the spirits of the unburied dead appear all white above the waters of the Bay of the Departed."

Shortly after Ropartz died, René Dumesnil wrote in Le Monde: "There is with Ropartz a science of folklore and its proper use, which one admires; but more often than the direct use of popular motifs it is an inspiration drawn from the same soil which nourishes the work, like sap in trees."

== Compositions ==
=== Orchestral ===
- Symphonies:
  - Symphony No. 1 «Sur un choral Breton» (1894/5)
  - Symphony No. 2 in F minor (1900)
  - Symphony No. 3 in E major for orchestra, choir and soloists (1905/6)
  - Symphony No. 4 in C major (1910)
  - Symphony No. 5 in G major (1945)
- La Cloche des morts (1887)
- Lamento for oboe and orchestra (1887)
- Les Landes (1888)
- Marche de fête (1888)
- Cinq pièces brèves (1889)
- Carnaval (1889)
- Dimanche breton, suite in 4 movements (1893)
- Fantaisie en ré majeur (1897)
- À Marie endormie (1912)
- La Chasse du prince Arthur (1912)
- Sons de cloches (1913)
- Soir sur les chaumes (1913)
- Rapsodie for cello and orchestra (1928)
- Sérénade champêtre (1932)
- Bourrées bourbonnaises (1939)
- Petite symphonie en mi bémol majeur (1943)
- Pastorales (1950)

=== Stage ===
- Fethlene (1887)
- Pêcheur d'Islande (1893)
- Le Pays (1912)

=== Chamber music ===
- six string quartets (1893 to 1949)
- Andante et allegro, for trumpet and piano (1903)
- two cello sonatas (1904, 1919)
- three violin sonatas (1907, 1917, 1927)
- Pièce in E flat minor, for trombone and piano (1908)
- Fantaisie brève sur le nom de Magnard, for string quartet (1892)
- Piano Trio in A minor (1918)
- Two pieces for wind quintet (1924)
- Prélude, Marine et Chansons, for flute, violin, viola, cello and harp (1928)
- Trio in A minor, for strings (1934–35)
- Entratta et Scherzetto, for wind trio (1936)

=== Sacred music ===
- Kyrie solennel, for 4 soloists, choir and organ (1886)
- Offertoire pascal, for organ (1889)
- Psaume 136: 'Super flumina Babylonis', for choir and orchestra (1897)
- Cinq Motets, for 4 mixed voices à cappella (1900)
- Messe brève en l'honneur de Sainte Anne, for three equal voices and organ (1921)
- Messe en l'honneur de Sainte Odile, for mixed chorus and organ (1923)
- Messe 'Te Deum laudamus', for 3 mixed voices and organ (1926)
- Requiem, for soloists, choir and orchestra (1938)
- Salve Regina, for mixed chorus and organ (1941)
- Psaume 129: 'De profundis', for soloist, choir and orchestra (1942)

=== Vocal music ===
==== Voice and orchestra ====
- Trois Prières
- La Fleur d'or
- Sous bois

==== Voice and piano ====
- Berceuse (1894)
- 4 Poèmes de l'intermezzo (1899)
- Veilles de départ (1902)
- Odelettes (1914)
- Les Heures propices (1927)
- La Mer
- Amour d'hiver
- Lied
- Le Petit enfant
- Sous bois
- Rondel pour Jeanne
- Rondel de miséricorde
- Rondeau pour un délaissé de s'amye

==== Choir ====
- Les Fileuses de Bretagne, women's choir
- Kyrie
- Les vêpres sonnent (1927)
- Nocturne (1926)
- Dimanche (1911)
- Le Miracle de saint Nicolas (1905)

=== Piano music ===
- Ouverture, variations et final (1904)
- Choral varié (1904)
- Nocturne No. 1 (1911)
- Dans l'ombre de la montagne (1913)
- Nocturne No. 2 (1916)
- Nocturne No. 3 (1916)
- Scherzo (1916)
- Musiques au jardin (1917)
- Croquis d'été (1918)
- Croquis d'automne (1929)
- Jeunes filles (1929)
- À la mémoire de Paul Dukas (1936)

=== Organ music ===
- Trois Pièces: Sur un thème Breton, Intermède, Fugue en mi mineur (1894)
- Vêpres du commun des saints (1896)
- 6 Pièces pour grand orgue: Prélude funèbre, Prière, Sortie, Thème varié, Prière pour les trépasses, Fantasie (1896–1901)
- Introduction et allegro moderato (1917)
- Rapsodie sur deux Noëls populaires (1919)
- Trois Méditations (1919)
- Au pied de l'autel (100 pieces for harmonium) (1919)

== Literary works ==
Ropartz was also a writer of literary works, notably poetry. In his youth he published three collections of verse influenced by the Symbolist movement. In 1889 he published with Louis Tiercelin Le Parnasse Breton contemporain, an anthology of Breton poetry of the second half of the 19th century. He also participated in la Revue l'Hermine, which Tiercelin founded a short while later, in 1890.

=== Poems ===
- Adagiettos (1888)
- Modes mineurs (1889)
- Les Muances (1892)

== See also ==
- List of composers from Brittany
