= Albéric Magnard =

French composer (1865–1914)

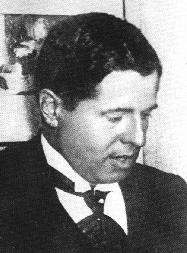
- Born: Lucien Denis Gabriel Albéric Magnard; 9 June 1865; Paris
- Died: 3 September 1914 (aged 49) "Manoir de Fontaines" at Baron
- Occupation: composer
- Notable work: Guercoeur, opera (1897–1900), Op. 12
- Spouse: Julie Creton

Signature
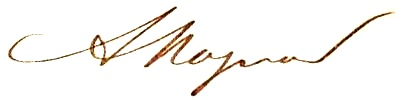

Lucien Denis Gabriel Albéric Magnard (French pronunciation: [lysjɛ̃ dəni ɡabʁijɛl albeʁik maɲaʁ]; 9 June 1865 – 3 September 1914) was a French composer, somewhat influenced by César Franck and Vincent d'Indy. Magnard became a national hero in 1914 when he refused to surrender his property to German invaders and died defending it.

== Biography ==
Magnard was born in Paris, the son of Francis Magnard, a bestselling author and editor of Le Figaro. Albéric could have chosen to live the comfortable life that his family's wealth afforded him, but he disliked being called "fils du Figaro" and decided to make a career for himself in music, based entirely on his own talent and without any help from family connections. After military service and graduating from law school, he entered the Paris Conservatoire, where he studied counterpoint with Théodore Dubois and went to the classes of Jules Massenet. There he met Vincent d'Indy, with whom he studied fugue and orchestration for four years, writing his first two Symphonies under d'Indy's tutelage. Magnard dedicated his Symphony No. 1 to d'Indy; and the two men always respected each other, despite their marked political differences (Magnard was pro-Dreyfus).

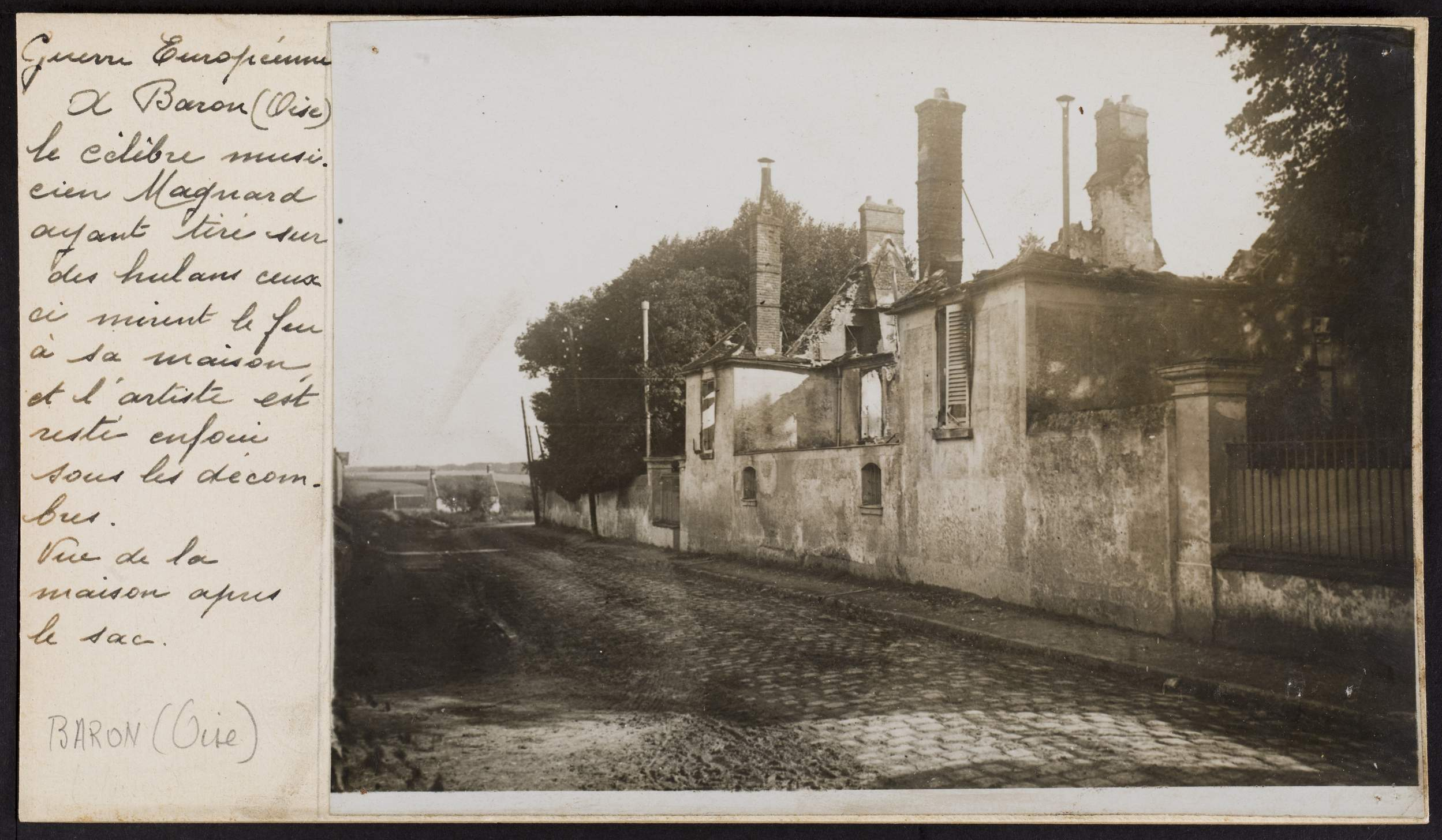
Magnard's house destroyed by the Germans, 1914.

Francis Magnard did what he could to support Albéric's career while trying to respect his son's wish to make it on his own. This included publicity in Le Figaro. With the death of his father in 1894, Albéric Magnard's grief was complicated by his simultaneous gratitude to and annoyance with his father.

In 1896, Magnard married Julie Creton, became a counterpoint tutor at the Schola Cantorum (recently founded by d'Indy) and wrote his Symphony No. 3 in B♭ minor.

== Death ==
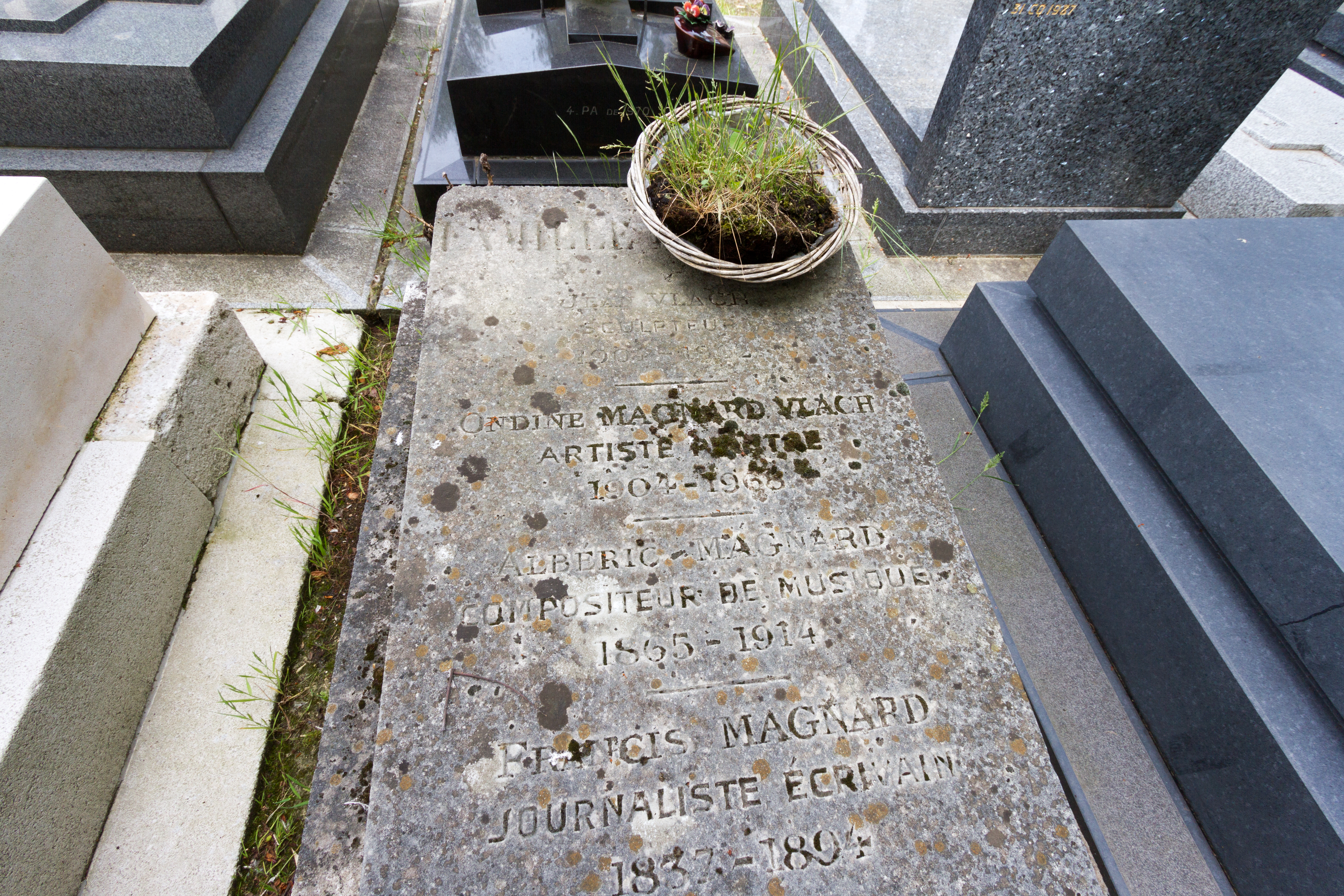
His grave at Passy Cemetery (Paris).

In 1914, at the beginning of World War I, Magnard sent his wife and two daughters to a safe hiding place while he stayed behind to guard the estate of "Manoir de Fontaines" at Baron, Oise. When German soldiers trespassed on the property, Magnard fired at them, killing one soldier, and they fired back before setting the house on fire. It is believed that Magnard died in the fire, although his body could not be identified in the ruins. The fire destroyed all of Magnard's unpublished scores, including the orchestral score of his early opera Yolande, the orchestral score of Guercoeur (the piano reduction had been published, and the orchestral score of the second act was extant), and a more recent song cycle. Guy Ropartz, who had led a concert performance of the third act of Guercoeur at Nancy in February 1908, would subsequently reconstruct from memory the orchestration of the acts that had been lost in the fire, and the Paris Opéra gave the work a belated world premiere in 1931.

== Music ==
Magnard's primary musical influences were contemporary French composers, particularly César Franck. Although he devoted much of his compositional efforts towards opera, nowadays he is probably best known for his four symphonies, certain passages of which demonstrate a more Germanic influence. His use of fugue and incorporation of chorale, together with the grandeur of expression in his mature orchestral works, have caused him to be called a "French Bruckner". Although Bruckner used cyclical forms long before d'Indy "trademarked" the concept to César Franck's name, Magnard's handling of cyclical form is more Franckian than Brucknerian. In his operas, Magnard used Richard Wagner's leitmotiv technique.

Magnard's whole musical output numbers a total of just 22 opus numbers. Along with the symphonies and operas are a handful of chamber works including a single string quartet, a quintet for piano and winds, a piano trio, a violin sonata (in G, opus 13), and a cello sonata (in A, opus 20). A few more were published posthumously, including the Quatre poèmes en musique, four songs for baritone and piano.

== Selected works ==
- Trois Pièces pour piano, Op. 1
- Suite dans le style ancien, Op. 2, for orchestra
- Six Poèmes, Op. 3, for voice and piano: 1. "À elle"; 2. "Invocation"; 3. "Le Rhin allemand"; 4. "Nocturne"; 5. "Ad fontem"; 6. "Au poète"
- Symphony No. 1 in C minor, Op. 4 (1890)
- Yolande, Op. 5, opera (1888–1891)
- Symphony No. 2 in E, Op. 6 (1893)
- Promenades, Op. 7, for piano (1894)
- Quintet in D minor, Op. 8, for piano, flute, oboe, clarinet & bassoon
- Chant funèbre, Op. 9 (1895)
- Overture, Op. 10 (1895)
- Symphony No. 3 in B♭ minor, Op. 11 (1896)
- Guercoeur, Op. 12, opera (1897–1900)
- Sonata in G, Op. 13, for violin and piano (1903)
- Hymne à la justice, Op. 14 (1903)
- Quatre Poèmes, for baritone and piano, Op. 15 (1903)
- String Quartet in E minor, Op. 16 (1904)
- Hymne a Venus, Op. 17 (1906)
- Trio in F minor, Op. 18, for piano trio (1905)
- Bérénice, Op. 19, opera (1905–1909)
- Sonata in A major, Op. 20, for cello and piano (1912)
- Symphony No. 4 in C♯ minor, Op. 21 (1913)
- Douze Poèmes, Op. 22
- En Dieu mon espérance
- À Henriette

== Selected recordings ==
Albéric Magnard, La Musique de chambre, Timpani Records, 4 CDs (Oct. 2014)

- CD 1: Violin Sonata in G major, Cello Sonata in A major
- CD 2: Piano Trio in F minor, Piano Quintet in D minor (for piano and wind instruments)
- CD 3: String Quartet in E minor
- CD 4: (spoken word; discussion in French of works with music excerpts between Harry Halbreich and Stéphane Topakian)

The four symphonies have been recorded by:

- The Orchestre du Capitole de Toulouse, conducted by Michel Plasson (EMI Classics, 1983/1987/1989)
- The BBC Scottish Symphony Orchestra, conducted by Jean-Ives Ossonce (Hyperion, 1997)
- The Malmö Symphony Orchestra, conducted by Thomas Sanderling (BIS Records, 2000)
- The Freiburg Philharmonic Orchestra, conducted by Fabrice Bollon (Naxos Records, 2019/2020)

The shorter orchestral works (Suite d'orchestre, op. 2, Chant funèbre, op. 9, Ouverture, op. 10, Hymne à la justice, op. 14, Hymne à Vénus, op. 17) are on Timpani 1C1171 (2010, Orchestre Philharmonique du Luxembourg, Mark Stringer) and on Naxos 8.574084 (2020, Philharmonisches Orchester Freiburg, Fabrice Bollon).

A complete recording of Guercœur was released by EMI Angel/Pathé Marconi in 1990. It features Hildegard Behrens, Nadine Denize, José van Dam, and Gary Lakes, with the Orchestre du Capitole de Toulouse conducted by Michel Plasson.
