= Germaine Hoerner =

French operatic soprano (1905–1972)

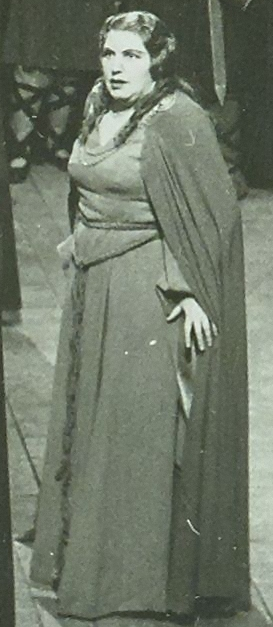
Hoerner in Götterdämmerung

Germaine Hoerner (26 January 1905 – 19 May 1972) was a French operatic soprano.

== Biography ==
Born in Strasbourg, Hoerner won First Prizes in singing and lyrical art at the Conservatoire de Paris, and made her debut at the Paris Opera in 1929 in Wagner's Die Walküre. She distinguished herself in the great Wagnerian roles, Elsa (Lohengrin), Elisabeth (Tannhäuser), Gutrune (Götterdämmerung) and Senta (Der fliegende Holländer) which she created at the Palais Garnier. Then she turned to the Italian bel canto, notably in the title role of Verdi's Aida, and Desdémone in Otello. She approached the French repertoire with Marguerite in Berlioz's La damnation de Faust, Valentine in Meyerbeer's Les Huguenots, Brunehild in Reyer's Sigurd, Bonté in Magnard's Guercœur, returned to the Germanic repertoire with Léonore in Beethoven's Fidelio, the Marschallin in Strauss's Der Rosenkavalier. In 1960, she retired from the stage and devoted herself to teaching in Strasbourg where she died in 1972.
