= José van Dam =

Belgian bass-baritone (1940–2026)

- Van Dam, c. 2005
- Born: Joseph Van Damme; 25 August 1940; Brussels, Nazi-occupied Belgium
- Died: 17 February 2026 (aged 85); Croatia
- Education: Royal Conservatory of Brussels
- Occupation: Operatic bass-baritone
- Organizations: Paris Opera; Deutsche Oper Berlin; Queen Elisabeth Music Chapel
- Title: Kammersänger
- Awards: Diapason d'Or

Joseph, Baron Van Damme (25 August 1940 – 17 February 2026), known as José van Dam (French: [ʒo.ze.van.dam]), was a Belgian bass-baritone, described as having "a magnificent resonant and expressive voice" and being "an excellent actor". Beginning at the Paris Opera, he made an international career, especially in the French repertoire; Escamillo in Bizet's Carmen was an early signature role that he took to La Scala in Milan and the Royal Opera House in London. He performed the title role of Messiaen's Saint François d'Assise in the 1983 world premiere at the Paris Opera. He performed regularly at the Salzburg Festival and made several recordings with Herbert von Karajan that are regarded as reference recordings. In film, he portrayed Leporello in the 1979 opera film Don Giovanni, directed by Joseph Losey and conducted by Lorin Maazel. He served as master of the singing section at the Queen Elisabeth Music Chapel from 2004 to 2023.

== Life and career ==
Van Dam was born in Ixelles, part of Brussels, on 25 August 1940. At the age of 17, he entered the Royal Conservatory of Brussels and studied with Frederic Anspach. A year later, he graduated with diplomas and first prizes in voice and opera performance. He made his opera debut as Don Basilio in Rossini's Il barbiere di Siviglia at the Opéra Royal de Wallonie in 1960. The next year, he was engaged at the Paris Opera where he first appeared in Les Troyens by Berlioz. He remained there until 1965, when he sang his first major role, Escamillo from Bizet's Carmen. Over the following two seasons, he performed it at La Scala in Milan and at the Royal Opera House in London, Van Dam appeared in the premiere of Milhaud's La Mère coupable at the Grand Théâtre de Genève in 1966. Lorin Maazel heard him and invited him to record Ravel's L'heure espagnole with him for Deutsche Grammophon. In 1967, Maazel asked him to join the Deutsche Oper Berlin, where he performed as Leporello in Mozart's Don Giovanni until 1973.

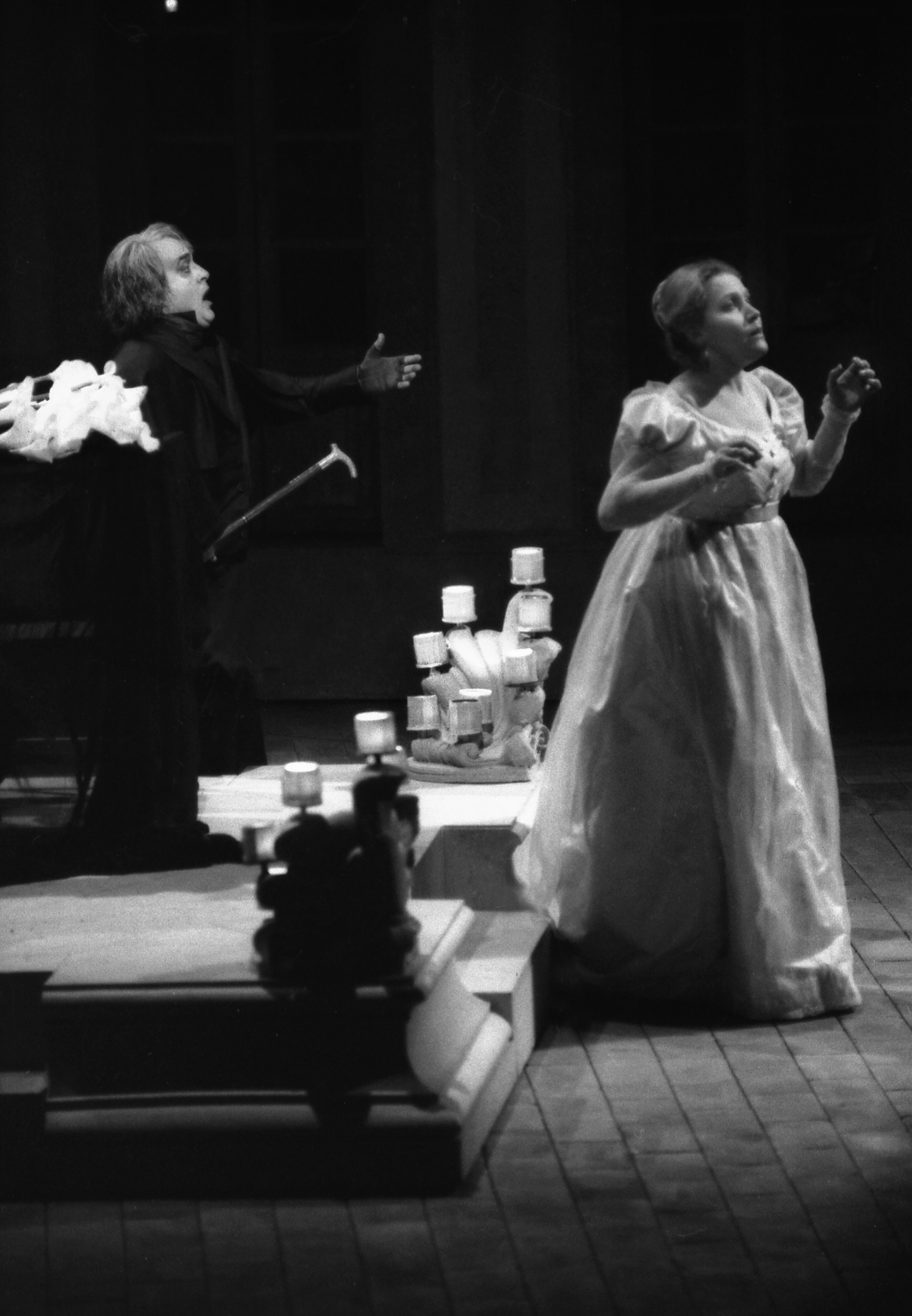
Van Dam as Miracle at La Monnaie, 1988

He performed at the Metropolitan Opera, the Vienna State Opera, La Monnaie in Brussels, Teatro Colón in Buenos Aires, at the Aix-en-Provence Festival and the Orange Festival. He performed the title role of Messiaen's Saint François d'Assise in the 1983 world premiere at the Paris Opera, conducted by Seiji Ozawa, and at the 1998 Salzburg Festival, staged by Peter Sellars and conducted by Kent Nagano. His last operatic performance was on 8 May 2010 in Massenet's Don Quichotte at La Monnaie, conducted by Marc Minkowski.

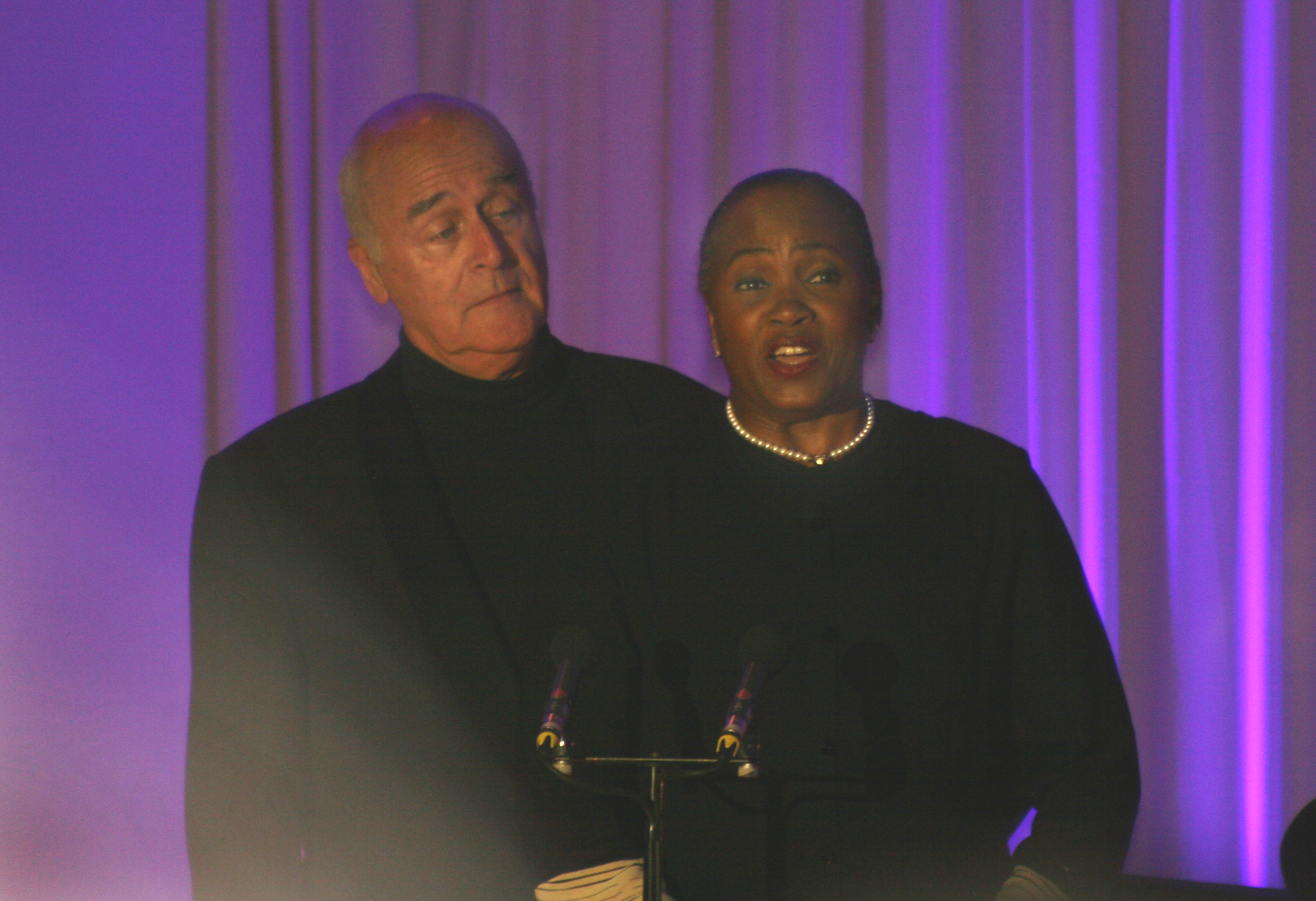
Van Dam and Barbara Hendricks, Brussels 2006

Van Dam was also a concert, oratorio, and lieder singer. He served as Master in Residence of the singing section at the Queen Elisabeth Music Chapel from 2004 to 2023, remaining active as a mentor after retirement.

Van Dam died at his home in Croatia on 17 February 2026, at the age of 85.

== Awards ==
Van Dam won international awards for his performances on stage and in recordings. Berlin conferred on him the title of Kammersänger in 1974, and he was a Commandeur des Arts et Lettres in France.

In August 1998, King Albert II of Belgium made Van Dam a baron, recognizing him as one of the finest classical singers.

He is featured as one of the three interviewees in Sylvie Milhau's book Doucement les Basses, with Gabriel Bacquier and Claudio Desderi, discussing their approach to roles in the bass-baritone repertoire.

== Films ==
Van Dam appears in the films The Music Teacher (1988) as Joachim Dallayrac, and in Don Giovanni (1979) as Leporello, directed by Joseph Losey, and conducted by Maazel.

== Recordings ==
With Karajan, he took part in twelve recordings, Beethoven's Fidelio (1970), the title role in Mozart's Le nozze di Figaro (1978), Jochanaan in Salome by R. Strauss (1978), Golaud in Pelléas et Mélisande (1978), Parsifal (1979–1980), Die Zauberflöte (1980), and the title role in Wagner's Der fliegende Holländer (1983). His recorded interpretations of Leporello, the Holländer, Amfortas and Joachanaan are regarded as reference recordings.
