= Charles Burles =

French opera singer (1936–2021)

Charles Burles (21 June 1936 – 22 August 2021) was a French lyric tenor, primarily associated with the French repertory, both opera and operetta.

== Life and career ==
Burles was born in Marseille, France, and as a child was taken to see opera by his father, an amateur musician and clown who worked on the local tram system. He undertook vocal studies there with Léon Cazauran. He made his stage debut in 1958, in Toulon. The following year he appeared at the Opéra de Marseille, as Almaviva in Il barbiere di Siviglia.

In the ensuing years, after national service, he sang mainly in Marseille expanding his repertory, with a few guest appearances in Lyon, Turin, and Venice. He made his debut at the Opéra-Comique in 1970 in Rameau's Zoroastre, and at the Paris Opéra in 1971. His roles at these two houses included: Lindoro, Nemorino, Ernesto, George Brown, Chapelou (which he also sang in many theatres around France), Vincent, Nadir, Gérard, Tonio, Arturo, etc. He also sang in several Jacques Offenbach operettas, and appeared in Belgium, Holland, Switzerland, and Israel. He created roles in Goya by Aubin (Lille, 1974), and L'Annonce faite à Marie (Paris, 1970) by Rossellini (1970).

A stylish singer, with a light and attractive voice, he can be heard on several recordings of French opera and operetta released by EMI France, often partnering with Mady Mesplé, the most famous being Lakmé, under Alain Lombard, in 1970, in which he sings the role of Gérald. He also recorded the small role of Hadji in the same opera, opposite Natalie Dessay in 1998. He died in his hometown.

== Selected recordings ==
- André Grétry - L'amant jaloux, as Florival, conducted by Edgard Doneux
- André Grétry - Richard Coeur-de-lion, as Richard, conducted by Edgard Doneux
- Gioachino Rossini - Il barbiere di Siviglia, as Almaviva, conducted by Jean-Pierre Marty (sung in French)
- Alexandre Charles Lecocq - La fille de Madame Angot, as Pomponnet, conducted by Jean Doussard
- Léo Delibes - Lakmé, as Gérald, conducted by Alain Lombard
- Robert Planquette - Les cloches de Corneville, as Grenicheux, conducted by Jean Doussard
- Louis Varney - Les mousquetaires au couvent, as Gontran, conducted by Edgard Doneux
- Jacques Offenbach - La belle Hélène, as Paris, conducted by Jean-Pierre Marty
- Jacques Offenbach - Orphée aux enfers, as Pluton, conducted by Michel Plasson
- Jacques Offenbach - Monsieur Choufleuri restera chez lui le..., as Chrysodule Babylas, conducted by Manuel Rosenthal
- Jacques Offenbach - Mesdames de la Halle, as Tambour-major Raflafla, conducted by Manuel Rosenthal
- Jacques Offenbach - La Grande-Duchesse de Gérolstein, as Prince Paul, conducted by Michel Plasson

== Sources ==
- Operissimo
- EMI Classics
- Charles Burles discography at Discogs
- Charles Burles at IMDb
