= The Last Savage =

Opera buffa in three acts by Gian Carlo Menotti

The Last Savage Le dernier sauvage
- Opera by Gian Carlo Menotti
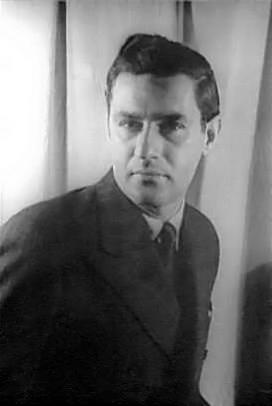
- The composer in 1944
- Librettist: Menotti, translated by Jean-Pierre Marty
- Language: French
- Premiere: 21 October 1963; Opéra-Comique, Paris

The Last Savage is an opera in three acts by composer Gian Carlo Menotti. Menotti wrote his own libretto, originally in the Italian language (L'ultimo selvaggio). The opera was translated into French (Le dernier sauvage) by Jean-Pierre Marty for the work's first (private) performance at the Opéra-Comique in Paris on 21 October 1963, followed the next day by the public premiere. George Mead translated the work into English for the opera's American premiere at the Metropolitan Opera the following year.

The opera was originally intended for the larger Paris Opéra, and the title was changed from The Last Superman to The Wild Man then to its final form. Menotti returned to his own Italian language in composing the libretto, but the premiere was in French; Menotti was also the producer of the premiere production. Opera magazine congratulated him and the conductor for "a beautifully thought-out and executed performance" which was "enormously applauded with one solitary boo-er".

The French daily newspaper Le Figaro went so far as to describe the work as "a misery".

== Performance history ==
Despite the response from the French public, Menotti hoped that the opera would get a warmer reception at its American premiere at the Metropolitan Opera in New York City on 23 January 1964. This presentation boasted a highly elaborate set by Beni Montresor, star billing, and was performed in English using a translation by George Mead. Conductor Thomas Schippers led the Met cast, which included George London as Abdul, Roberta Peters as Kitty, Teresa Stratas as Sardula, Nicolai Gedda as Kodanda, Ezio Flagello as the Maharajah, Lili Chookasian as the Maharanee, and Morley Meredith as Scattergood. Though the quality of the singing was praised by critics, New York's response to the opera was negative.The Metropolitan Opera then took the work on its east coast tour in April/May 1965.

Four months later, the work was first performed in the original Italian at La Fenice in Venice on 15 May 1964 with conductor Carlo Franci, John Reardon as Abdul, Helen Mané as Kitty, Maliponte as Sardula, Robleto Merolla as Kodanda, Angelo Nosotti as Scattergood, and Paolo Washington as the Marajah.

Italy's reception of the La Fenice production was lukewarm and the opera was not performed again for many years. Reactions from critics internationally commented on the opera's poor libretto. At that time avant-garde music was in vogue and critics felt Menotti's conservative style of composition was overly sentimental and trite, although a few of the arias and a septet in the work were generally praised. Several critics commented that the music failed to live up to the quality of earlier Menotti operas like The Saint of Bleecker Street (1954) and The Consul (1950). In response to this reaction to his opera, Menotti stated:

"To say of a piece that it is harsh, dry, acid and unrelenting is to praise it. While to call it sweet and graceful is to damn it. For better or for worse, in The Last Savage I have dared to do away completely with fashionable dissonance, and in a modest way, I have endeavored to rediscover the nobility of gracefulness and the pleasure of sweetness."

A revised version of the opera was given by the Hawaii Opera Theatre in 1973 with John Reardon as Abdul (repeating the role he created in Italian at La Fenice), Joanna Bruno as Kitty, Gary Glaze as Kodanda, and David Clartworthy as Mr. Scattergood. Menotti directed. Critics seemed to like this version better. The Honolulu Star-Bulletin said it was "packed with solid, wonderful, memorable music" and that John Reardon's performance was "simply flawless."

The opera was revived in 1981 at the Spoleto Festival USA in honor of the composer's 70th birthday. The production was led by conductor Christian Badea and starred Suzanne Hong as Kitty. Menotti also directed a production in 1984 at the Festival dei Due Mondi in Spoleto, this time starring baritone Louis Otey as Abdul and conducted by the late Baldo Podic.

It was presented as part of the 2011 festival season by the Santa Fe Opera under conductor George Manahan directed by Ned Canty, with Anna Christy as Kitty, Daniel Okulitch as Abdul, Jennifer Zetlan as Sardula, Sean Panikkar as Kodanda, Thomas Hammons as the Maharajah, Jamie Barton as the Maharanee, and Kevin Burdette as Scattergood. Critical reception of the production was positive, with several critics calling for a re-examination of the piece. A reviewer of the March 2026 revival by Odyssey Opera in Boston hailed the work as "a neglected comedic masterwork" replete with "a buoyant overture, an array of striking solo arias and remarkable ensembles" rather than the fiasco of legend.

Menotti reverts from the singing-speech of The Consul (derived according to the composer from Monteverdi) to reviving the means of the classical Italian comic opera of Cimarosa and Rossini, with recitative and aria, stanzas, and musical numbers. The score includes large ensembles where the characters stand motionless coloratura for the heroine. The Opera critic noted a "charming" solo for the 'savage' with the refrain "Je ne suis pas jaloux", which was vitiated by a duet immediately following in similar vein and rhythm. The second act's cocktail-party scene was described as "clever and calculated" and the first act "mostly jog-trot".

== Roles ==
Role	Voice type	Premiere cast, 21/22 October 1963 (Conductor: Serge Baudo)
Abdul	baritone	Gabriel Bacquier
Kitty	soprano	Mady Mesplé
Sardula	soprano	Adriana Maliponte
Prince Kodanda	tenor	Michele Molese
Scattergood	bass	Xavier Depraz
The Maharajah	bass	Charles Clavensy
The Maharani	mezzo-soprano	Solange Michel

== Synopsis ==
Time: the 1960s
Place: Rajaputana, India and Chicago, USA

Kitty, a young student of anthropology at Vassar College, arrives in India in search of the earth's "last savage" – the chosen topic for her senior thesis. She is accompanied by her parents, an American millionaire and his wife, who are more interested in finding Kitty a husband than in their daughter's research. Kitty's parents attempt to entice Kitty into marrying the Marajah's son, the Crown Prince of Rajaputana, but she refuses to do so until she has found her savage. Her parents accordingly hire the peasant Abdul to pretend to be a savage for $100,000. Kitty is fooled by this ruse and accordingly captures Abdul. She plans to take Abdul back to Chicago where she intends to present him to the scientific community and put him on display in an exhibit at the New York Zoo.

On the flight back to New York, Kitty becomes quite attached to Abdul and decides to keep him for herself. In Chicago she attempts to civilize him without success and Abdul ends up ruining a cocktail party that Kitty hosts with several important guests in attendance. Abdul flees the ruined party and is not found by Kitty until several months later when she discovers him in a jungle cave. Kitty declares her love for Abdul and decides to move into the cave with him. The opera ends with the couple in each other's arms while Kitty's father's servants deliver modern appliances such as a television and a refrigerator to the cave.
