= Eustase Thomas-Salignac =

French opera singer

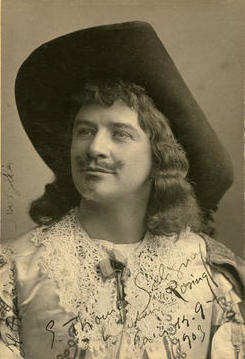
Eustase Thomas-Salignac

Eustase Thomas, known under the stage name Salignac or Thomas-Salignac (29 March 1867 – 6 November 1943 in the 7th arrondissement of Paris) was a French tenor and lyrical singing professor.

== Biography ==
Born in Générac, Gard department, Eustase Thomas-Salignac was the son of a coffee maker. Initially trained in lyrical singing in Marseille, the city of his childhood, he was a prize-winner of violin and singing. He then joined the Conservatoire de Paris where he followed the courses of Victor Alphonse Duvernoy and won the prize for opéra comique by singing the role of Don José in Bizet's Carmen. Strengthened by this viaticum, he began in 1893 at the Opéra-Comique in Richard Cœur-de-Lion.

The following season, his career took on an international dimension, straddling the United States and Great Britain. He made himself known there as the principal tenor of the French lyrical repertoire of his generation. After a tour in the northeast of the country, he made his debut at the Metropolitan Opera of New York on 11 December 1896, performing Don José in Carmen, where he responded to the already famous soprano Emma Calvé. At the end of the season, he returned to London where he sang at Covent Garden from 1897 to 1899. He performed again at the Metropolitan Opera of New York from 1898 to 1903, alternating with Covent Garden where he performed from 1901 to 1904.

Returning to France in 1905, Salignac sang at the Opéra-Comique for the following years, taking up his favourite role of Don José for his return to the national stage. Recruited to the post of director of the Casino municipal de Nice in 1912, he gained experience as a show business owner. He became a singing teacher at the American Conservatory of Fontainebleau in 1923, and was the mentor of the American tenor Charles Kullman. From 1924, he taught the course of lyrical declamation at the Conservatoire national de musique et de déclamation. Apart from a short interlude at the head of a French lyrical troupe touring Canada and New York in 1926, Salignac remained faithful to this house where he completed his career. Among the students who followed her instruction was the singer Solange Michel. A renowned professor, he was admitted to retirement on 1 October 1936.

Between the two World Wars, Thomas-Salignac was heavily involved in professional bodies working for the defence and promotion of lyrical art. In March 1922, he founded the periodical Lyrica, "revue mensuelle illustrée de l'art lyrique et de tous les arts", which he directed until hits handover in March 1939. President of the Professional Union of French Masters of Singing from 1926 to 1939, he was also the founding president of the Académie du Chant, a "grouping for the technical and scientific study of Voice and Singing", in 1929. A renowned and generous artist, he had among his friends, in addition to many professionals of lyrical singing, novelist Roland Dorgelès.

Under the Nazi occupation, he compromised himself by sitting as a member of the Music Section Executive Committee (chaired by composer Max d'Ollone) from the Groupe Collaboration.

Officer of Academy and Public Education, he had been decorated chevalier of the Légion d'honneur on 9 March 1936.

== Roles and publications ==
Esteemed lyrical tenor, Salignac essentially visited the classical repertoire of the Opéra comique. He also practiced the works of contemporary creators. Interpreter regularly requested by Jules Massenet (title role of Werther, roles of Jesus in Marie-Magdeleine in 1906 and the chevalier des Grieux in Manon, premiere of Sapho in the 1909 version), he was part of the opera cast of Raoul Laparra (premiere of La Habanera and La Jota), Charles-Marie Widor (premiere of Les pêcheurs de Saint-Jean, in 1905), Guy Ropartz (premiere of Le Pays, in 1913) and Darius Milhaud. He sang the title role in Henri Rabaud's Mârouf, savetier du Caire when it was revived in 1917-1918. He created Manuel de Falla's chamber opera El retablo de Maese Pedro, performed in the private theatre of the princesse de Polignac in 1923.

In the opinion of an American critic at Salignac's American debut at the Metropolitan Opera in New York as Don José, "he is not a man of broad body and imposing appearance, and his voice lacks strength and volume.... His diction is a little fast, but he sings with accuracy and feeling". The artist's performances were marked by a southern accent that was appreciated by the public.

The oldest recorded fragment of his voice is included in the Mapleson Cylinders. In one of the single excerpts containing his voice (there is also a recording of the act 3 finale from Gounod's Faust in which he can be heard singing a single word at the end of the recording), Salignac can be heard along with Marcella Sembrich in a portion of the love duet from Donizetti's La Fille du régiment, under the direction of Philippe Flon, during the performance given on 30 January 1903.

With Louis Merlet, Salignac composed with four hands the libretto of an opera put to music by Louis Merlet. Albert Wolff: Le Marchand de masques, lyrical drama in two acts. The work was premiered in 1914 at the casino municipal de Nice and its booklet published in Paris by Enoch. (1914, 39 p.).

Finally, he co-authored with Pierre-Barthélemy Gheusi a posthumous homage book to a couple of opera singers: Jeanne Myrtale. Jean Moulierat, Rouen, impr. Wolf, 1933, 136 p.

== Sources ==
- Légion d'honneur file for Eustase Thomas-Salignac.
- Digitized collection of the review Lyrica on Gallica, in particular the March 1936 issue devoted to the banquet and speeches celebrating the presentation of the Légion d'honneur to Salignac.
- Gallica: Salignac performing as Naïl drawn by Paul Charles Delaroche.
- Notice "Salignac" in The concise Oxford dictionary of opera, 1996, (p. 452).
- Oscar Thompson and Nicolas Slonimsky: The international cyclopedia of music and musicians, Dodd-Mead, 1958.
