= L'amant jaloux =

French comédie mêlée d'ariettes in three acts by André Grétry

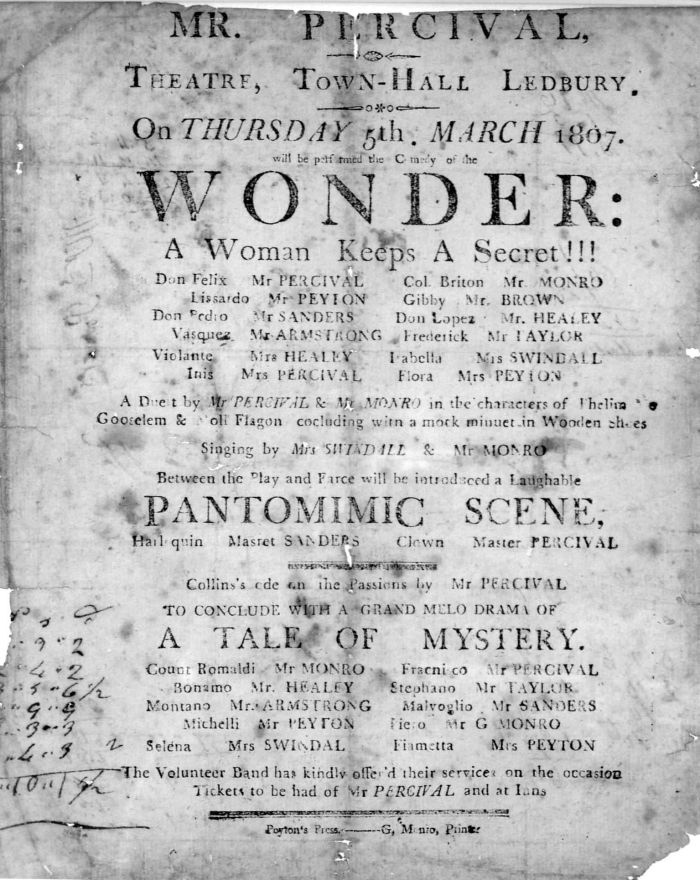
Poster for 1807 production of Centlivre's The Wonder: a woman keeps a secret, the basis of the work

L'amant jaloux, ou Les fausses apparences (The Jealous Lover, or False Appearances) is a French comédie mêlée d'ariettes in three acts by André Grétry first performed at Versailles on 20 November 1778. The libretto is by the Irish playwright Thomas Hales (also known by the French name Thomas d'Hèle) with the verse passages provided by F. Levasseur. It was based on the play The Wonder: A Woman Keeps a Secret (1714) by Susannah Centlivre.

The most famous arias in the opera include O douce nuit, the tenor serenade Tandis que tout sommeille (While all are sleeping) (recorded by Roberto Alagna, amongst others) and the coloratura display piece Je romps la chaîne qui m'engage. The composer admitted the last named aria had no dramatic function, but he wanted to give his soprano star Marie-Jeanne Trial ("the finest voice ever formed by nature") "a chance to shine". The musicologist David Charlton claims Mozart and his librettist Lorenzo da Ponte knew Grétry's opera and were influenced by its ensembles when they wrote The Marriage of Figaro.

Grétry's score for L'amant jaloux includes mandolins. Philip J. Bone, historian of the mandolin, speculated that Grétry was exposed to the instrument while in Italy, and said "he makes use of it upon various occasions, in this instance with a telling and marked impression." This instance was the seranade Tandis que tout sommeille (While all are sleeping) in L'amant jaloux. Bone called the serenade "a delicate accompaniment for two mandolins".

Bampton Classical Opera performed the opera in English in 2012. The role of Isabelle was sung by the Australian soprano Martene Grimson.

The opera was performed by The Pinchgut Opera in December 2015, in the City Recital Hall, Sydney, Australia.

== Roles ==
Role	Voice type	Premiere Cast, 20 November 1778 (Conductor: - )
Don Alonze, the lover of Léonore	taille (tenor)	Jean-Baptiste Guignard, called Clairval
Lopez, a businessman	basse-taille (bass-baritone)	M. Nainville
Léonore, his daughter	soprano	Marie-Jeanne Trial, née Milon
Florival, a French officer	taille	M. Jullien
Isabelle, the sister of Don Alonze	soprano	Catherine-Ursule Billion, née Bussa(rt), called Mlle Billioni
Jacinte, Léonore's housekeeper	soprano	Louise-Rosalie Lefebvre, called Mme Dugazon

== Synopsis ==
Place: Cádiz, Spain

The rich merchant Don Lopez does not want his young, widowed daughter Léonore to remarry. However, she is in love with the insanely jealous Don Alonze. Alonze's sister and Léonore's friend, Isabelle, is being pursued by her tutor who wants to marry her. The tutor is driven off by the French officer Florival and Isabelle takes refuge with Léonore. The jealous Alonze mistakes Isabelle for a secret lover of Léonore (Isabelle is wearing a veil). Léonore is annoyed at the jealous Don Alonze. Florival arrives at the house in search of the mysterious stranger he has saved, with whom he is now in love. The housekeeper Jacinte tells him the house belongs to Léonore and he mistakenly assumes she is the woman he is after. Alonze overhears Florival singing a serenade (Tandis que tout sommeille) to "Léonore" and storms off in another jealous rage. Florival and Alonze confront each other in the garden at night. They are both relieved to find they are not rivals when Alonze finally recognises his sister. Alonze has just come into an inheritance which allows him to marry Léonore, and Florival marries Isabelle.

== Recordings ==
=== Audio ===
- L'amant jaloux Mady Mesplé, Bruce Brewer, Jules Bastin, Danièle Perriers, Charles Burles, Orchestre Philharmonique de la RTB, conducted by Edgard Doneux (EMI, 1978; reissued on CD 7243 5 75263 2 6, 2002)

- L'amant jaloux Magali Simard-Galdès, Hélène Guilmette, Guylaine Girard, Pierre Derhet, Artavazd Sargsyan, Matthieu Lécroart, Arion Orchestre Baroque conducted by Mathieu Lussier (ATMA Classique, 2026 CD 7243 5 75263 2 6)

=== Video ===
- L'amant jaloux Magali Léger, Claire Debono, Maryline Fallot, Frédéic Antoun, Brad Cooper, Vincent Billier, Le Cercle de l'Harmonie, conducted by Jérémie Rhorer (Wahoo 1 DVD, 2010)

== Sources ==
- 1779 libretto: Les fausses apparences, ou L'amant jaloux, Comédie en trois actes mêlée d'ariettes: Représentée devant Leurs Majestés, à Versailles en Novembre 1778 (in French). Paris: Duchesne. 1779.
- Article by David Charlton in The Viking Opera Guide ed. Holden (1993)
- Booklet notes to the above recording
