= Les mousquetaires au couvent =

Opérette in three acts by Louis Varney

Les mousquetaires au couvent (The Musketeers at the Convent) is an opérette in three acts by Louis Varney, with a libretto by Jules Prével and Paul Ferrier, after the 1835 vaudeville L'habit ne fait pas le moine by Amable de Saint-Hilaire and Paul Dupont. It was Varney's most successful work, and the only one to have maintained a place in the French repertoire.

== Performance history ==
It was first performed at the Théâtre des Bouffes-Parisiens in Paris on 16 March 1880, where it was revived in a revised version on 2 September 1880 and then in 1883, 1896 and 1906. It was also produced in Paris at the Théâtre des Folies-Dramatiques from 1886 to 1909, as well as at the Théâtre des Menus-Plaisirs in 1896 and 1897 and the Théâtre de la Gaîté in 1899, 1901 and 1913.

Since 1945, the operetta has had a few major productions in France, notably at the Théâtre de la Gaîté-Lyrique in 1952 and 1957. There were also presentations in 1968 at the Porte Saint Martin Festival in Paris, and at the Opéra-Comique in 1992, with Gabriel Bacquier. A production was mounted in Nice in 2001, and in June 2015 the Opéra-Comique presented a new production by Jérôme Deschamps, conducted by Laurent Campellone.

== Roles ==
Roles, voice types, premiere cast
Role	Voice type	Premiere cast, 16 March 1880
Vicomte Narcisse de Brissac	baritone	Frédéric Achard
Gontran de Solanges	tenor	Émile Marcelin
Abbé Bridaine	bass	Paul Hittemans
Comte de Pontcourlay, governor of Touraine	bass	Dequercy
Marie de Pontcourlay	soprano	A Louise Rouvroy
Louise de Pontcourlay	soprano	Élise Clary
Simone	soprano	Giulia Bennati
La Supérieure of the Ursuline convent	mezzo-soprano	Chevalier
Soeur Opportune		Becker
Rigobert, of the King’s musketeers	bass	Paul Jorge
Pichard, landlord of tavern 'Au mousquetaire gris'		Desmonts
First monk		Durand
Second monk		Charlet
Jeanneton, a pupil		Lynnès
Claudine, a pupil		Luther
Margot, a pupil		Bouland
Agathe, a pupil		Gabrielle
Jacqueline		Rivero
Langlois		Chambéry
Farin		Soumis
Chorus: Townsfolk, musketeers, nuns

== Synopsis ==
The action takes place in Touraine, under the reign of King Louis XIII.

=== Act 1 ===
At the tavern 'Au Mousquetaire Gris'
In the courtyard of 'The Grey Musketeer', musketeers and others are drinking. Simone intervenes when rivalry between soldiers and local men gets too heated, preventing a fight and separating them with a song. The musketeers have been billeted in the town by order of the Governor of Touraine, Comte de Pontcourlay, to watch out for conspiracies against the throne.

Gontran de Solanges has fallen in love with the niece of the governor, and his fellow officer Brissac has sent for his friend’s old tutor, the Abbé Bridaine, to cure him of this. The object of Gontran’s love, Marie, is a pupil, along with her sister Louise, at the Convent des Ursulines in Vouvray where the nuns guard their charges with great care. Bridaine agrees to speak to the governor on behalf of Gontran. However, the arrival of the Comte de Pontcourlay brings news that his two nieces are to be prepared to take the veil. Bridaine is appalled, but the Comte is firm: the order has come from the Cardinal Richelieu. Gontran is in despair, but Brissac persuades him to join in an escapade: they steal into a room where two itinerant monks are sleeping, and take their clothes. Another officer locks the monks in their room and the two disguised officers set off for the convent.

=== Act 2 ===
A class at the convent of the Ursulines
The convent girls are being instructed by Sister Opportune. The Mother Superior enters and tells that, at the request of the governor, they will receive a visit from two important priests who will take confession from them. Louise gets the other girls to all make the same confession. Brissac intersperses his conversation with military talk, and eyes up the girls. Gontran does better maintaining his disguise and manages to arrange a secret meeting with Marie. The girls go for their lunch, but when Brissac realises that as it is a fast day he explains that he has a special dispensation to have food.

Abbé Bridaine, having noticed the absence of his two friends now arrives at the convent to speak with Marie before Gontran does. He is met by Louise who has begun to have suspicions about the two ‘priests’, Bridaine sends her off and tells Marie that his pupil Gontran has fallen in love with her but that she must write to him saying that she has no feelings for him. Marie replies that she has become attracted to Gontran, but gives in and writes the letter when Bridaine says that the Cardinal will have Gontran dealt with if he does give Marie up. Gontran is crushed when he reads the note, although he has found another, more tender, letter in Marie’s desk, and he refuses to despair.

Brissac, drunk after his lunch, instead of preaching his holy sermon, launches into a song praising love. The Superior collapses with shock, and Gontran and Bridaine try to explain that their friend has sunstroke from his last pilgrimage to Palestine. All join in the dancing and singing.

=== Act 3 ===
A courtyard at the convent
Gontran's regiment arrive at the convent to receive his orders in helping him to carry off Marie. Louise chats with Brissac through the window of a shed. The innkeeper has sent Simone to find Bridaine. Gontran asks to pen a farewell note to his beloved, but the note is not a farewell, but contains instructions for Marie to escape with Gontran via the convent wall. While the nuns discuss the preparations for the Cardinal's visit the following day, Gontran and Marie meet, vow their love, but are joined by Brissac and Louise, who has insisted on leaving with them as the price of her silence. A ladder is produced from the gardener's shed but before they can climb it, they hear Bridaine and hide. When Bridaine spots the ladder he thinks that Marie has been abducted, and climbs up to check, at which Simone removes it. He is left stranded on the wall when the governor arrives at the convent gate. He announces that the two monks who came to the convent are imposters, and must be arrested: they are planning to kill the Cardinal during his visit there the next day. The two musketeers now reveal who they are and are acclaimed as heroes as they have helped in the capture of the false monks at the tavern. As reward for their exploit, Gontran and Brissac request to wed the Pontcourlay sisters.

== Selected discography ==
- 1953: Michel Dens (Brissac), Raymond Amade (Gontran), Duvaleix (Bridaine), Lina Dachary (Marie), Liliane Berton (Louise), Nadine Renaux (Simone), Deva Dassy (Soeur Opportune) - Orchestre des concerts Lamoureux, Choeurs Raymond Saint-Paul, Marcel Cariven (conductor) - Pathé (extracts)
- 1957: Gabriel Bacquier (Brissac), Pierre Blanc (Gontran), Louis Musy (Bridaine), Janine Cauchard (Marie), Mireille Lacoste (Louise), Colette Riedinger (Simone), Gabrielle Ristori (Soeur Opportune) - Choeurs et Orchestre, Robert Benedetti (conductor) - Musicdisc (Decca France, re-issued Musidisc 2000)
- 1979: Michel Trempont (Brissac), Charles Burles (Gontran), Jules Bastin (Bridaine), Mady Mesplé (Marie), Christiane Château (Louise), Michèle Command (Simone), Claude Vierne (Soeur Opportune) - Choeurs de la RTBF et de la La Monnaie, Orchestre de la RTBF, Edgard Doneux (conductor) - (EMI Classics 1979).
