= Saltimbanco (disambiguation) =

Saltimbanco was a Cirque du Soleil show which ran from 1992 to 2006 in its original form.

Saltimbanco may also refer to:

- Les saltimbanques 1899 comic opera by Louis Ganne
- Les Saltimbanques, an 1838 "farce désopilante" by Théophile Marion Dumersan
- Family of Saltimbanques, 1905 painting by Pablo Picasso
- "The Saltimbanques," a 2001 short horror story by Terry Dowling

== See also ==
- Acrobat
