= Louis Ganne =

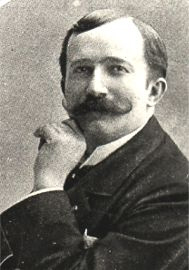
Louis Ganne (1862–1923).

Louis-Gaston Ganne (5 April 1862 in Buxières-les-Mines (Allier) – 13/14 July 1923 in Paris) was a conductor and composer of French operas, operettas, ballets, and marches.

== Biography ==
Ganne was born in the Auvergne region of France and grew up in Issy-les-Moulineaux, in the suburbs of Paris. He studied under César Franck and Jules Massenet at the Conservatoire de Paris. He conducted at the Nouveau Théâtre de la Rue Blanche and at the Folies-Bergère, and later led a concert series at the Monte Carlo Casino.

Ganne is most recognized today for his popular patriotic marches, Le père la victoire and La marche Lorraine. He also composed for the ballet, including the 1902 ballet "In Japan". He is less well known outside his native France, and his many operettas are now rarely performed. His most successful light opera is the circus musical Les saltimbanques (The Acrobats), from 1899.

== Selected operas and operettas ==
- Ophélia (1887)
- Tout Paris (1891)
- L'Heureuse rencontre (1892)
- Rabelais, opera in 4 acts (1892)
- Les colles des femmes (1893)
- Le Réveil d'une parisienne (1894)
- La Puce (1894)
- Raseur (1895)
- Qui veut de l'amour? (1899)
- Les saltimbanques, opera in 3 acts (1899)
- Miss Bouton d'Or, opera in 2 acts (1902)
- Les Plaques de l'année, (1906)
- Hans, le joueur de flûte, opera in 3 acts (1906)
- Les Ailes (1910)
- Rhodope, opera in 3 acts (1910)
- Cocorico, opera in 3 acts (1913)
- L'Archiduc des Folies-Bergère, opera in 2 acts (1916)
- La Belle de Paris, opera in 2 acts (1922)

== Sources ==
Ganne, Louis by Kurt Gäzl, in 'The New Grove Dictionary of Opera', ed. Stanley Sadie (London, 1992) ISBN 0-333-73432-7
