= Marie Perbost =

French soprano (born 1989)

Marie Perbost (born 1989) is a French operatic soprano.

== Life ==
Coming from a family of musicians (her father was a wind instrument teacher and her mother a singer), Perbost studied the cello from the age of 4 to 9, then she joined the Maîtrise de Radio France where she trained with conductors, among others Kurt Masur and Chung Myung-whun. Early one she left Sarcelles to go to school in Paris with modified timetables.

She was accepted at the Conservatoire de Paris where she studied Lied with Alain Buet and Cécile de Boever, and melody with Anne le Bozec.

In 2001, together with 3 singers from the Palais Royal ensemble, she founded the Ensemble 101 to perform Mike Solomon's creations.

She made her soprano debut on stage in 2013, performing the role of Blanche de la Force in the Dialogues of the Carmelites by Francis Poulenc at the Paul Dukas Conservatory in Paris.

Together with pianist Joséphine Ambroselli, they won the Special Prize of the Friends of the Lied at the Enschede International Lieder Competition (Netherlands) in 2013. In 2014, they were laureates of the international competition "Les Saisons de la voix" in Gordes, then Grand Prix at the Nadia and Lili Boulanger International Competition in 2015.

She was awarded the Prix du Centre français de promotion lyrique at the Concours de l'Opéra Grand Avignon and was named Révélation lyrique of the ADAMI in 2016.

In 2017, she joined the Académie de l'Opéra de Paris as she performs Elisetta in Il matrimonio segreto by Domenico Cimarosa at the Philharmonie de Paris.

She received grants from the Fondation l'Or du Rhin (Fondation de France), the Meyer Foundation and the Kriegelstein Foundation.

== Prizes ==
- 2016 : Révélation artiste lyrique de l'ADAMI
- 2020 : Révélation artiste lyrique aux Victoires de la musique classique.

== Roles ==
- Blanche de la Force – Dialogues of the Carmelites
- Despina – Così fan tutte,
- Elisetta – Il matrimonio segreto
- La jeune femme – Reigen
- Pamina – Die Zauberflöte
- Marzelline – Fidelio
- Tullia – Il mondo alla roversa
- Lucine – Le Testament de la tante Caroline
- Marguerite d'Artois – Richard Cœur-de-Lion

== Recording ==
- Une jeunesse à Paris, label Harmonia Mundi (chansons and operettas of the années folles).
- Bach, J.S. - Magnificat BWV 243a
