= Michel Trempont =

French opera singer (1928–2021)

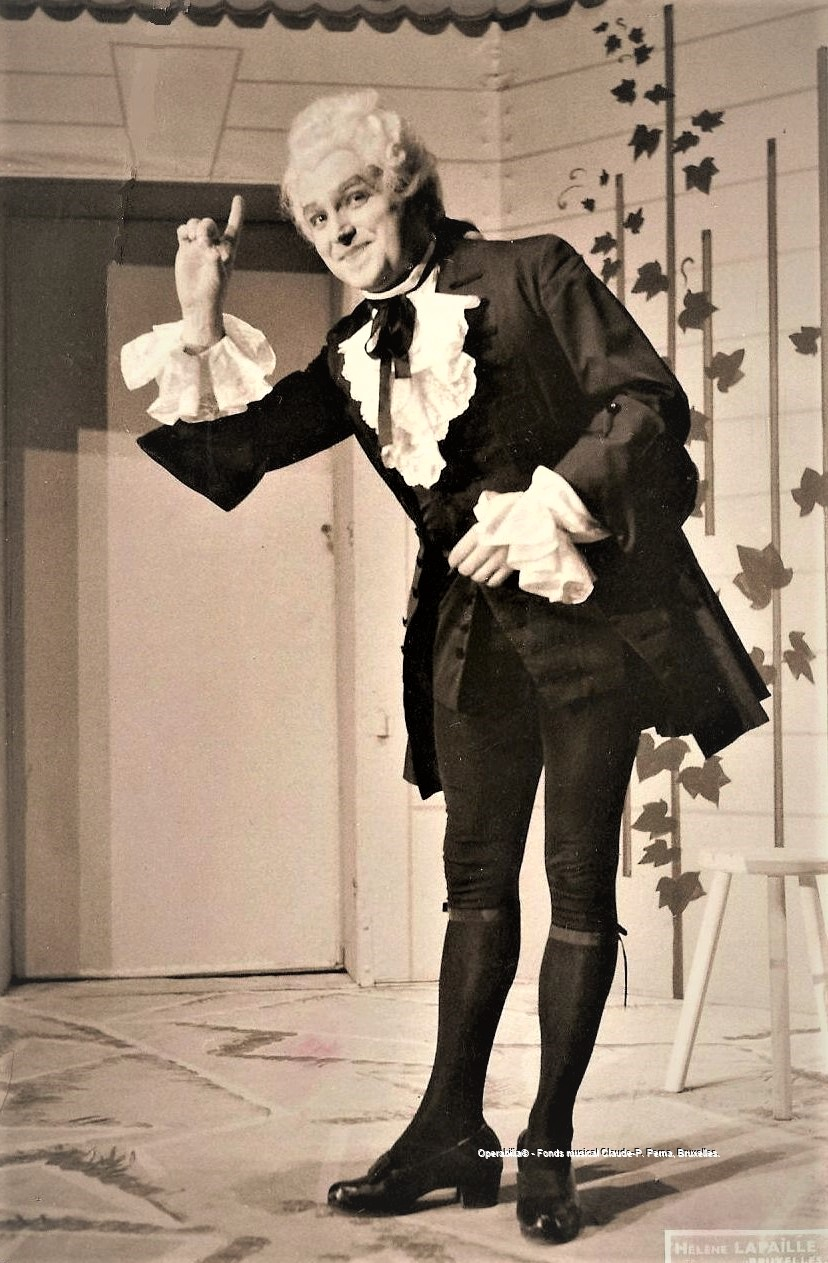
Trempont in Monsieur Beaucaire, 1956

Michel Trempont (28 July 1928 – 30 January 2021) was a Belgian operatic baritone whose repertoire extended from the 18th century to the creation of contemporary works. His brother was Pol Trempont (1923–2007), operatic tenor and one time director of the Théâtre de Mons.

== Life and career ==
After studies with Rogatchewsky, Trempont made his debut in Liège in 1952 as Valentin. He then appeared at La Monnaie in 1956, where he went on to sing, among other roles: Le mari in Menotti's Amelia Goes to the Ball, Le Mesge in Henri Tomasi's L'atlantide, Ajax Deuxième in Offenbach's La belle Hélène, Marcello in Puccini's La bohème, Moralès in Bizet's Carmen, Silvio in Leoncavallo's Pagliacci, Tourillon in Johann Strauss's Die Fledermaus (as La chauve-souris), Roger de Lansquenet in Reynaldo Hahn's Ciboulette, Jean in Bohuslav Martinů's Comedy on the Bridge (as Comédie sur le pont), Masetto in Mozart's Don Giovanni (as Don Juan), Le frère jardinier in Tomasi's Don Juan de Manara, a vagabond in Carl Orff's Die Kluge (as Echec au roi), Maître Pausanias in Chabrier's Une éducation manquée, Valentin in Gounod's Faust, Louchard in Charles Lecocq's La fille de Madame Angot, Le marquis Bambini in Offenbach's La fille du tambour-major, Vitellius in Massenet's Hérodiade, Jun (one of the gangsters) in Cole Porter's Kiss Me, Kate, Frédéric in Léo Delibes' Lakmé, a rascal in Orff's Der Mond (as La lune), Banquo in Verdi's Macbeth, De Brétigny in Massenet's Manon, Bacarel in Edmond Audran's Miss Helyett, Borello in Henry Février's Monna Vanna, Bantison in André Messager's Monsieur Beaucaire, Bridaine in Louis Varney's Les mousquetaires au couvent, Phorbas in Enescu's Œdipe, Le chien in Albert Wolff's L'oiseau bleu, the Beggar in John Gay's The Beggar's Opera (as L'opéra du gueux), Gustav von Pottenstein in Franz Lehár's The Land of Smiles (as Le pays du sourire), Panatellas in Offenbach's La Périchole, Ceprano in Verdi's Rigoletto, Moussoul in Adolphe Adam's Si j'étais roi, Monsieur Choufleuri in Offenbach's M. Choufleuri restera chez lui le . . ., Gardefeu in Offenbach's La Vie parisienne, and Albert in Massenet's Werther.

Trempont attained an international career with performances at the Opéra-Comique in Paris, where he made his debut in 1966, and sang (French versions) Figaro in the Mozart opera and in Rossini's; Marcello, Sharpless, Gaillardin (Gabriel von Eisenstein) in Die Fledermaus (La Chauve-Souris), Rimbaud in Le comte Ory, Zurga in les pêcheurs de perles and le Marquis de Clainvillela in Sauguet's La Gageure imprévue. He appeared at the Festival d'Aix-en-Provence, the Royal Opera House London, La Scala, Milan, La Fenice, Venice, Teatro San Carlo in Naples and San Francisco Opera. His repertoire has included Figaro (in both Mozart's Le nozze di Figaro and Rossini's Il barbiere di Siviglia), Guglielmo (Così fan tutte), Rimbaud (Le comte Ory), Sulpice (La fille du régiment), Fieramosca (Benvenuto Cellini), Taddeo (L'italiana in Algeri), Sancho (Don Quichotte), and the king in Prokofiev's L'Amour des trois oranges.

At Grand Théâtre de Genève his roles have included: the Sacristan, Pandolphe (Cendrillon), Le Baron de Gondremarck, Crespel, Peter (Hänsel et Gretel), Carpe (La Forêt), V'lan (Le voyage dans la lune, also televised), and Pantalon (L'Amour des trois oranges).

As the Comte de Fritelli he took part in a complete BBC broadcast of Chabrier's Le roi malgré lui recorded in Manchester in 1973, conducted by Manuel Rosenthal.

== Discography ==
List of recordings of complete operas by composer with title, recording label, and role:

- Adolphe Adam: Le toréador (Decca) – Don Belflor
- Daniel Auber: Fra Diavolo (EMI) – Giacomo
- Georges Bizet: Carmen (EMI) – Dancaire
- Gaetano Donizetti: La fille du régiment (EMI) – Sulpice
- André Grétry: Richard Coeur-de-lion (EMI) – Blondel
- Jules Massenet: Manon (DG) - Brétigny
- André Messager: Fortunio (EMI) – Maître André
- Jacques Offenbach:
  - Les brigands (EMI) – Pietro
  - Mesdames de la Halle (EMI) – Madame Madou
  - Monsieur Choufleuri restera… (EMI) – Petermann
  - Orphée aux enfers (EMI) – Jupiter
  - La Périchole (EMI) – Panatellas
  - La Vie parisienne (EMI) – Bobinet
- Gioachino Rossini: La cambiale di matrimonio (Universal) – Mill
- Ambroise Thomas: Hamlet (EMI) – Polonius
- Louis Varney: Les mousquetaires au couvent (EMI) – Brissac
