= Jules Prével =

French journalist and opera librettist

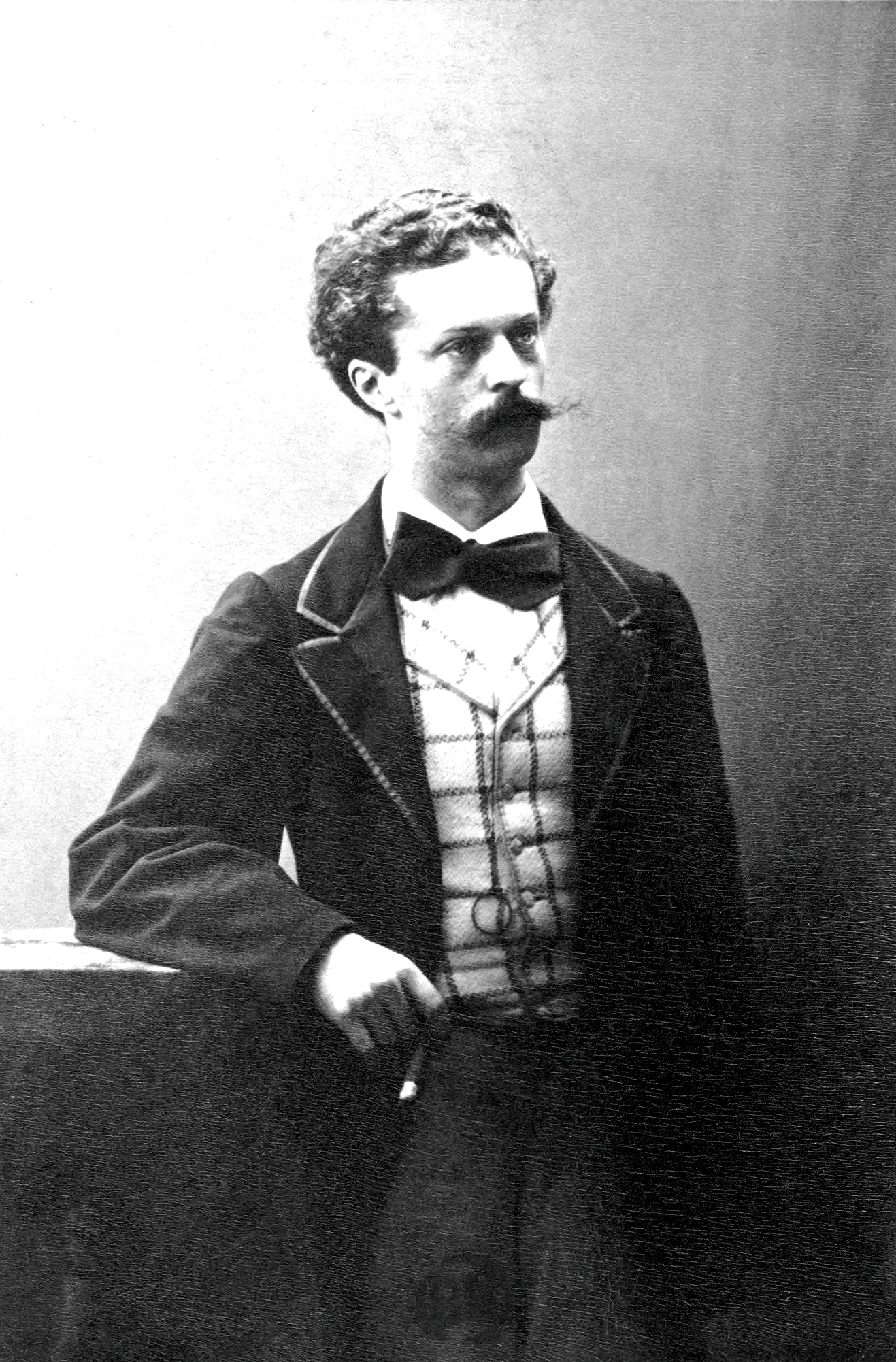
Jules Prével

Jules Prével (1835 in Saint-Hilaire-du-Harcouët – 1889 in Paris) was a 19th-century French journalist and opera librettist.

For a while, he was responsible for the theatre column in Le Figaro.

He participated in the writing of the libretto of the opérette La Romance de la rose by Jacques Offenbach (1869) as well as that of Le grand Casimir by Charles Lecocq (1879), Les Mousquetaires au couvent by Louis Varney (1880) and L'Amour mouillé (1887). (see list on bnf site below).
