= Le roi Arthus =

1903 French opera

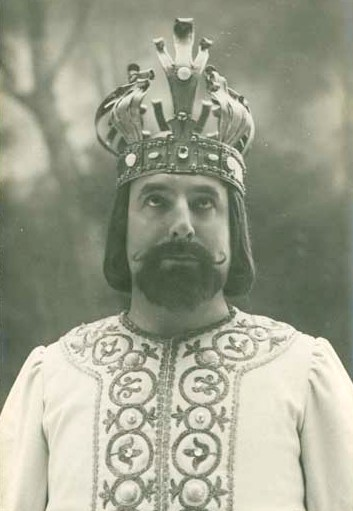
Henri Albers as Arthus, 1903

Le roi Arthus (King Arthur) is an opera in three acts by the French composer Ernest Chausson to his own libretto. It was composed between 1886 and 1895, and first performed 30 November 1903 at the Théâtre de la Monnaie, Brussels, after long delays. The musical style is heavily influenced by the works of Richard Wagner, particularly Tristan und Isolde and Parsifal, as well as César Franck. The scenery at the premiere was designed by Albert Dubosq and the symbolist painter Fernand Khnopff; it was executed by Dubosq's atelier together with Chausson's brother-in-law Henry Lerolle and under the supervision of Chausson's widow.

The opera was revived at the Paris Opera in May 2015 with Thomas Hampson in the title role, Sophie Koch as Genièvre and Roberto Alagna as Lancelot, conducted by Philippe Jordan, in a production by Graham Vick.

== Roles ==
Roles, voice types, premiere cast
Role	Voice type	Premiere cast, 30 November 1903 Conductor: Sylvain Dupuis
Arthus	baritone	Henri Albers
Genièvre	mezzo-soprano	Jeanne Paquot d'Assy
Lancelot	tenor	Charles Dalmorès
Lyonnel	tenor	Ernest Forgeur
Merlin	baritone	Édouard Cotreuil
Mordred	bass	François
Allan	bass	Jean Vallier
A worker	tenor	Henner
A knight / a squire	bass	Danlée
Chorus: Knights, squires, pages, bards; Genièvre's ladies

== Synopsis ==
Act 1
Fresh from his defeat of the Saxons, King Arthur praises the fighting prowess of the Knights of the Round Table, particularly Lancelot. That night Lancelot meets Arthur's wife Guinevere for an adulterous tryst but the two are spied on by Mordred. Lancelot fights and wounds him.

Act 2
Lancelot flees to his castle with Guinevere. He learns that Mordred has survived and revealed the truth to the king. Arthur consults the wizard Merlin who foretells the downfall of the Round Table.

Act 3
Arthur pursues Lancelot and gives battle, but Lancelot throws away his weapons and refuses to fight his king. Guinevere, fearing Lancelot's imminent death, strangles herself with her own hair. Arthur forgives the mortally wounded Lancelot. A vessel arrives at the coast to bring the king to the 'Ideal'.

== Recordings ==
- 1986: Gino Quilico, Teresa Zylis-Gara, Gösta Winbergh, René Massis, French Radio Chorus and New Philharmonic Orchestra, conducted by Armin Jordan (Erato)
- 1996: Philippe Rouillon, Susan Anthony, Douglas Nasrawi, Evgenij Demerdjiev, Vienna Symphony Orchestra, conducted by Marcello Viotti. (KOCH. Bregenz Festival: there are some cuts.)
- 2005: François Le Roux, Susan Bullock, Donald McIntyre, Andrew Schroeder, Paul Parfitt, BBC Symphony Orchestra, conducted by Leon Botstein (Telarc, 2005)
