= Solange Michel =

French opera singer (1912–2010)

Solange Michel as Carmen.

Solange Michel (27 November 1912 – 15 December 2010) was a French classical mezzo-soprano who sang in concerts, recitals, and operas from the 1930s to the 1970s. She was particularly associated with the French opera repertory and was one of the most popular interpreters of the title heroine in Georges Bizet's Carmen in post World War II France.

== Life and career ==
Born Solange Boulesteix in Paris, Michel studied at the Conservatoire de Paris under Eustase Thomas-Salignac and André Gresse. She began her career as a concert singer, giving her first performance on French Radio in 1936, and made her stage debut in 1942, as Charlotte in Werther.

In 1945, she changed her name to Solange Michel and became a member of the Opéra-Comique where she debuted as Mignon. Shortly afterwards, she was invited to perform at the Paris Opera, and quickly established herself as the most important mezzo of her era. Her interpretation of Carmen is now widely regarded as a classic. Other notable roles included; Charlotte, Dalila in Camille Saint-Saëns's Samson et Dalila, Geneviève in Claude Debussy's Pelléas et Mélisande, Marguerite in Hector Berlioz's La damnation de Faust, and Orfeo in Christoph Willibald Gluck's Orfeo ed Euridice. She also participated in the premieres of Pierre Wissmer's Marion in 1951, and Gian Carlo Menotti's The Last Savage in 1963.

She made guest appearances at the Royal Opera House in London, at La Scala in Milan, the Teatro San Carlo in Naples, the Liceu in Barcelona, the Teatro Colón in Buenos Aires, also appearing in Amsterdam, Brussels, Madrid, Lisbon, etc.

Michel was also much admired as a recitalist, and made her last appearance in Besançon, in 1978.

She made a number of recordings, the most famous being Carmen, opposite Raoul Jobin, and conducted by André Cluytens.

== Sources ==
- Le dictionnaire des interprètes, Alain Pâris, (Éditions Robert Laffont, Paris, 1989), ISBN 2-221-06660-X
