= Adriana Maliponte =

Italian operatic soprano (born 1938)

Adriana Maliponte (born 26 December 1938 in Brescia) is an Italian operatic soprano.

Born Adriana Macchiaioli, she moved with her family to France at the age of 14. She studied first at the Mulhouse Conservatory and later in Como with Carmen Melis and made her stage debut at the Teatro Nuovo in Milan in 1958. In 1960 she won the Geneva International Singing Competition and quickly became a regular presence on the world's best opera stages during the 1960s and 1970s, making her debut at La Scala in 1970 as Manon, and at the Metropolitan Opera in 1971 as Mimi.

She created the role of Sardula in the world premiere of Gian Carlo Menotti's Le dernier sauvage at the Paris Opera in 1963. Maliponte has performed on several opera recordings including the role of Micaela on Leonard Bernstein's 1972 recording of Bizet's Carmen which won a Grammy Award for Best Opera Recording.

== Sources ==
- The Metropolitan Encyclopedia, edited by David Hamilton, Simon & Schuster, 1987.
- Operissimo.com, "Maliponte, Adriana"
