= Marche Lorraine =

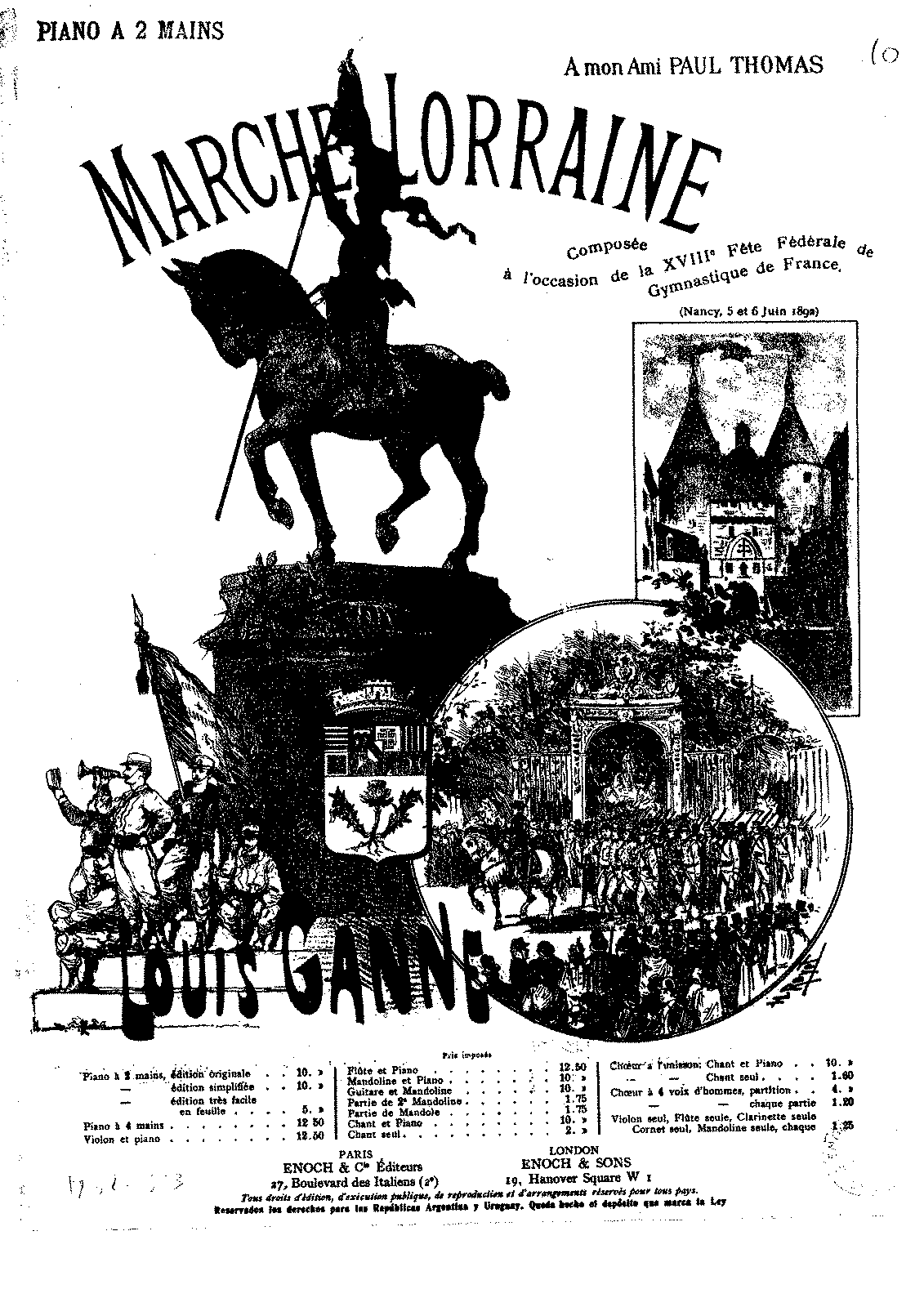
- Sheet music cover

Song
- Language: French
- Written: 1892
- Genre: Patriotic song
- Composer(s): Louis Ganne
- Lyricist(s): Octave Pradels, Jules Jouy

"Marche Lorraine" is a French patriotic song, composed by Louis Ganne in 1892 on the occasion of the 28th Fête Fédérale de Gymnastique de France (Federal Celebration of Gymnastics in France). The lyrics are by Octave Pradels (1842–1930) and Jules Jouy (1855–1897).

The melody recalls the traditional song "En passant par la Lorraine". Originally belonging to the revanchist movement of late 19th century France, the "Marche Lorraine" has since become a standard of the official French military repertoire.

== Recordings ==
There are two recordings released in the United States, one from 1917 and another from 1919.

=== 1917 version ===
The song was recorded on July 2, 1917, and released under the Victor record label.

=== 1919 version ===
This version was released under the Columbia record label. The French Army Band performed the song. In February 1919, it reached the number six spot on the US song charts.
