= Générac, Gard =

Générac
- Commune
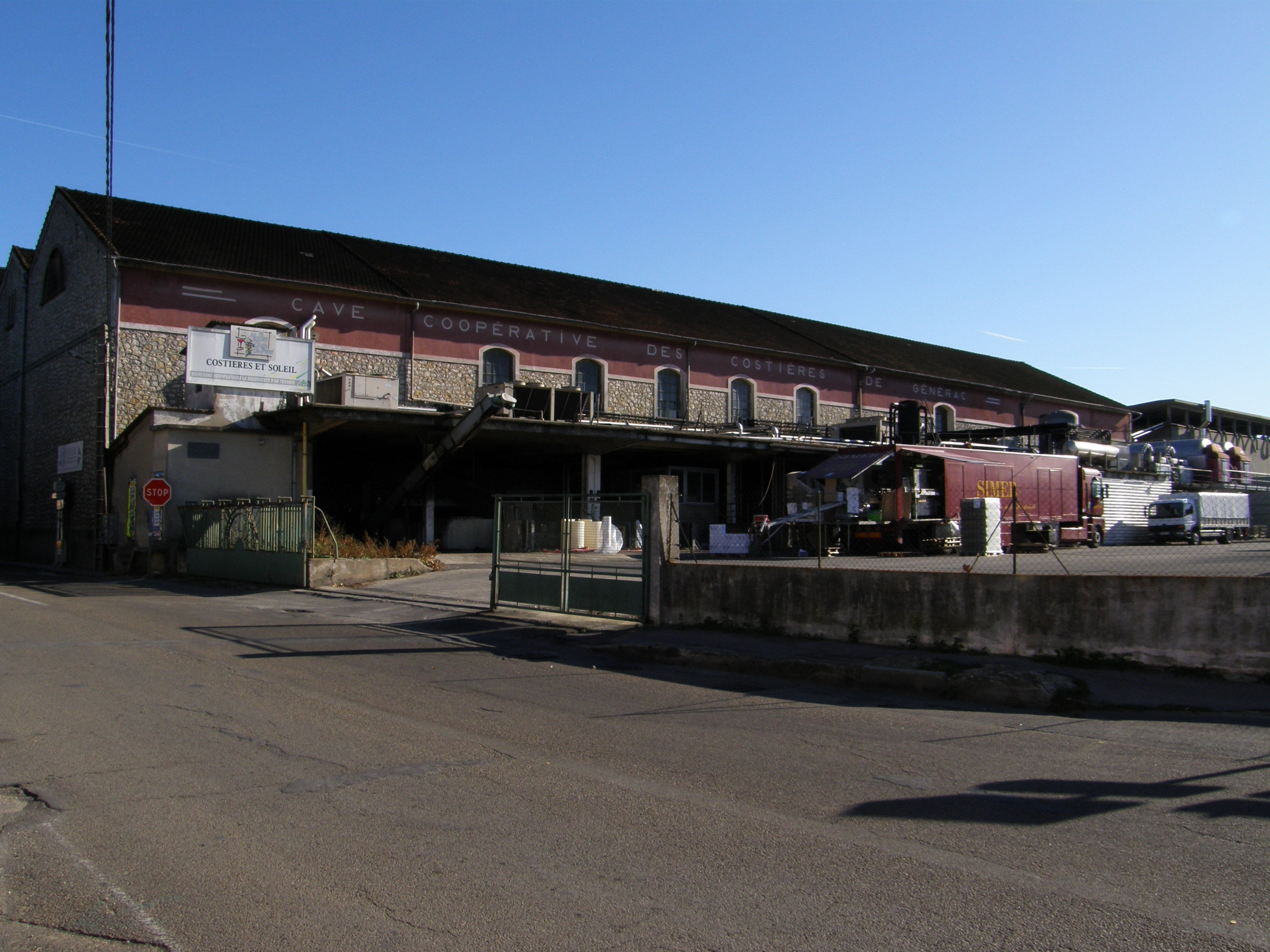
- Cooperative winery
- Location of Générac
- Location within France Location within Occitanie
- Coordinates: 43°43′45″N 4°20′58″E
- Country: France
- Region: Occitania
- Department: Gard
- Arrondissement: Nîmes
- Canton: Saint-Gilles
- Intercommunality: CA Nîmes Métropole

Government
  - Mayor (2020–2026): Frédéric Touzellier
- Area^{1}: 24.26 km^{2} (9.37 sq mi)
- Elevation: 82 m (269 ft)
- Highest elevation: 144 m (472 ft)
- Lowest elevation: 29 m (95 ft)
- Population (2023): 4,046
  - Density: 166.8/km^{2} (431.9/sq mi)
- Time zone: UTC+01:00 (CET)
  - Summer (DST): UTC+02:00 (CEST)
- INSEE/Postal code: 30128 /30510
- ^{1} French Land Register data, which excludes lakes, ponds, glaciers > 1 km^{2} (0.386 sq mi or 247 acres) and river estuaries.

Générac (French pronunciation: [ʒeneʁak]; Occitan: Generac) is a commune in the Gard department in southern France. Générac station has rail connections to Nîmes and Le Grau-du-Roi. Tenor Eustase Thomas-Salignac (1867–1943) was born in Générac.

== Population ==
Historical population

Year	Pop.	±% p.a.
1793	1,100	—
1800	1,183	+1.04%
1806	1,416	+3.04%
1821	1,740	+1.38%
1831	1,883	+0.79%
1836	1,904	+0.22%
1841	1,988	+0.87%
1846	1,930	−0.59%
1851	1,940	+0.10%
1856	2,084	+1.44%
1861	2,159	+0.71%
1866	2,287	+1.16%
1872	2,260	−0.20%
1876	2,207	−0.59%
1881	1,814	−3.85%
1886	1,848	+0.37%
1891	1,983	+1.42%
1896	1,945	−0.39%
1901	2,080	+1.35%

Year	Pop.	±% p.a.
1906	2,112	+0.31%
1911	2,034	−0.75%
1921	1,886	−0.75%
1926	1,785	−1.09%
1931	2,030	+2.61%
1936	1,855	−1.79%
1946	1,630	−1.28%
1954	1,667	+0.28%
1962	1,650	−0.13%
1968	1,682	+0.32%
1975	1,764	+0.68%
1982	2,113	+2.61%
1990	2,925	+4.15%
1999	3,223	+1.08%
2007	3,717	+1.80%
2012	4,012	+1.54%
2017	4,118	+0.52%
2023	4,046	−0.29%

Source: EHESS and INSEE (1968-2023)

== See also ==
- Communes of the Gard department
- Costières de Nîmes AOC
