= Kenton Coe =

American composer (1930–2021)

- Born: November 11, 1930; Johnson City, Tennessee, U.S.
- Died: December 29, 2021 (aged 91)
- Partner: Jean-Pierre Marty

Kenton Summers Coe (November 11, 1930 – December 29, 2021) was an American composer.

== Biography ==
Coe was born in Johnson City, Tennessee, the younger of two sons born to Cleveland Beach Coe (1893-1945) and Margaret Rebecca (Summers) Coe (1893-1981). He spent the first five years of his life in Johnson City, after which he moved with his family to Knoxville and Chattanooga, where they lived from 1935-1945 while Coe’s father worked for the Tennessee Valley Authority and served in WWII. It was during that time, around 1936, that Coe first began his musical training at the Cadek Conservatory in Chattanooga. Coe attended Sewanee Military Academy from 1946-1947 and then returned to Johnson City with his mother (his father died in 1945 while serving in WWII) where he graduated from Science Hill High School in 1948. He attended Hobart College in New York for two years before transferring to Yale University in 1950 to study composition with Paul Hindemith and Quincy Porter. Coe graduated from Yale in May 1953 and left that summer for Paris, France to study music composition with Nadia Boulanger at the Paris Conservatory and the American School at Fontainebleau. What was initially a six-week summer program evolved into three years of private composition study, sponsored by two scholarships through the French government for which Boulanger advocated.

It was during this time that Coe first met Jean-Pierre Marty, a pianist and conductor with whom Coe would share a romantic partnership for most of his life. Coe remained in France until 1957, when he and Marty moved to New York City, where they would remain until Coe returned to Johnson City in 1974 and Marty moved back to France. Aside from a five-year period living in Lake Summit, NC (2007-2012), Coe would stay in Johnson City for the next 43 years, until 2017. He spent his final years in Easley, SC and Asheville, NC, where he died on December 29, 2021.

== Compositions ==
While Coe’s student compositions date to the 1940s, he considered his first mature piece to be the opera “South,” which he began composing in 1960 and worked on until its premiere in 1965 by the Opera of Marseilles, under the direction of Jean-Pierre Marty. The work, based on Julien Green’s three-act play “Sud” from 1953, would be performed again in 1972 by the Paris Opera, making Coe the first American to have an opera produced by the organization. Coe went on to write a number of stage works (operas, one-act musical plays, and ballets), including the opera “Rachel” on which he collaborated with librettist Anne Howard Bailey and which was premiered by the Knoxville Opera Company in 1989.

Coe wrote extensively for piano and organ, including “Sonata for Piano” which was given its American premiere by Kenneth Huber at the National Gallery of Art in Washington, D.C., in 1977, and “Fantasy for Organ” (1991) which was commissioned by Stephen Hamilton and served as the focus of Hamilton’s 1992 DMA Thesis. He composed orchestral pieces, works for various chamber ensembles, and various pieces for chorus and vocal soloists. As an active member of the Episcopal Church, Coe also composed numerous anthems and other sacred pieces. Finally, Coe composed over a half dozen film scores, first working with Romain Gary on “Birds in Peru” in 1968, and going on to collaborate with documentarian Ross Spears on a number of films from the late 1970s through the 2010s, including "Agee" (1980) which was nominated for an Academy Award for best feature documentary.

Many of Coe’s pieces were written in response to specific commissions, including “Concerto for Organ, Strings, and Percussion” commissioned by the Festival du Commings in 1980; “Scherzo for Clarinet, Brass, and Strings” by the Johnson City Symphony in 1986; “Ischiana” by the Baton Rouge Symphony in 1989; “Purcellular” by the City of London in 1995; and “Architects of Heaven” by the Carolina Concert Choir in Hendersonville, NC around 2008, which Coe once described as “probably the best work I have ever written.”

Coe’s work was also supported by various grants, awards, and fellowships throughout the years. This included two ten-week fellowships in 1960 and 1963 from the MacDowell Colony, an artists’ residency and workshop in Peterborough, NH, where he worked on the opera “South” under the sponsorship of composer Aaron Copland; a $75,000 award from the Lyndhurst Foundation in 1985; and various grants from state and federal arts organizations including the National Endowment for the Arts and the Tennessee Arts Commission.

Coe received a number of awards and accolades throughout his life, including the Samuel Doak Award from Tusculum College in 1980, a Governor’s Award in the Arts from the state of Tennessee in 1990, Composer of the Year from the Tennessee Music Teachers’ Association in 1998, and an honorary doctorate degree from East Tennessee State University in 2007.
