= Helen Roessing =

Helen Elizabeth Roessing Aiton (22 August 1891 – 27 May 1957) was an American composer of piano music whose composition won first prize at the Conservatoire Americain de Fountainebleau in France. She published her music under the name Helen Roessing.

Roessing was born in Pittsburgh, Pennsylvania, to Laura Orr and George Roessing. She married Oliver Aiton in 1945.

Roessing studied composition with Leo Sowerby at the Conservatoire Americain, where she won the Prix Tremaine First Prize in 1927 for her piano composition Au Fil de l’Eau Drifting. She also studied with Louise Robyn at the American Conservatory of Music in Chicago. In 1933 while presenting a recital in Pittsburgh, Marcel Dupre improvised on themes submitted by local composers, including one composed by Roessing. In addition to composing, Roessing was the music director at the Ellis School for Girls and worked as an accompanist and organist at several Presbyterian churches.

Roessing’s works were published by Durand et Cie and J. Fischer & Bro. She composed unspecified music for organ, as well as:

== Works ==
=== Piano works ===
- Au Fil de l’Eau Drifting
- Pop-corn Balls
- Shuffling Sam
- Skiing

=== Vocal works ===
- “A Lullaby” (text by Margaret Townsend Scully)
- “Fashion” (text by Margaret Townsend Scully)
