= Lyric Opera of Los Angeles =

Lyric Opera of Los Angeles is a small non-profit opera company in Los Angeles, California. It was founded in 2002 by Laura Sage and features lesser known opera works that have rarely been made into staged productions. LOLA (as it is also known) has since put on several premiere productions including Heinrich Marschner's Der Vampyr and Daniel Auber's Manon Lescaut. As part of their 2010/2011 season, Lyric Opera of Los Angeles presented the U.S. staged premiere of Wagner’s Die Feen (The Fairies).

The opera company was chosen as a partner with Los Angeles Opera along with more than 75 other L.A. institutions in its Ring Festival LA, an event showcasing the works of Richard Wagner.
