= René Massis =

French contemporary baritone (born 1947)

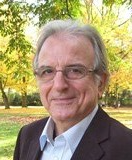
René Massis in 2013

René Massis is a French contemporary baritone.

== Biography ==
Born in Lyon, Massis studied singing and lyrical art at the Conservatoire national supérieur musique et danse de Lyon, in addition to his university studies (modern letters) at the Faculty of Lyon and won his prizes in 1968. He then travelled to Italy to Milan where he spent seven years perfecting his technique and studying the Italian repertoire.

Over the course of his career, he has performed an extensive repertoire, invited by the following theatres and concert companies : Opéra de Marseille, Opéra de Nice, Opéra national de Paris, Opéra-Comique de Paris, Théâtre des Champs-Élysées de Paris, Radio-France, Opéra de Lyon, Opéra du Rhin (Strasbourg), Opéra de Nancy, Opéra de Lille, Opéra de Nantes, Théâtre des Arts de Rouen, Opéra de Metz, Grand Théâtre de Bordeaux, Théâtre du Capitole Toulouse, Opéra de Montpellier, Festival de Radio-France and Montpellier, Opéra d’Avignon, Grand Théâtre de Genève, Opéra de Lausanne, Opéra de Francfort, Festival de Glyndebourne, The Scottish Opera (Glasgow Edinburgh), BBC Birmingham, Le Concertgebouw dof Amsterdam, L’Opéra des Flandres Antwerps, La Scala of Milan, the Teatro Donizetti di Bergamo, Le Maggio Musicale Fiorentino, L’Opera di Roma, La RAI di Napoli, the Teatro Massimo di Palermo, the Teatro Petruzzelli di Bari, LA RAI di Torino, Le Palau de la Musica de Barcelone, LA TVE Madrid, ABAO of Bilbao, Le Teatro de Santiago de Chile…

After stopping his singing career, René Massis was artistic delegate to the Opéra national de Lyon (Director General Alain Durel) for five years. Since 2006, he has been head of the artistic agency "Agence Massis Opéra".

== Distinctions ==
In 1986, René Massis was made a chevalier in the Ordre des Arts et des Lettres.

== Repertoire ==
=== Opera ===
- Adam's Le postillon de Lonjumeau (Bijou)
- Auber's Manon Lescaut (Marquis d’Hérigny)
- Barraud's Numance (Scipion)
- Berg's Wozzeck
- Berlioz's Benvenuto Cellini (Fieramosca), Béatrice et Bénédict (Claudio)
- Bizet's Les Pêcheurs de perles (Zurga), Carmen (Escamillo)
- Catalani's Dejanice (Dardano)
- Chausson's Le Roi Arthus (Mordred)
- Cherubini's Medea (Creonte)
- Cilea's Adriana Lecouvreur (Michonnet)
- Cimarosa's Il matrimonio segreto (Robinson)
- Dallapiccola's Volo di notte (Rivière)
- Delibes' Le roi l'a dit (Moncontour)
- Donizetti's Lucia di Lammermoor (Enrico), L'elisir d'amore (Bercore), Don Pasquale (Malatesta), La Favorite (Alphonse), La Fille du régiment (Sulpice)
- Giordano's Andrea Chenier (Carlo Gérard)
- Gluck's Iphigénie en Aulide (Thoas), Alceste (Hercules)
- Gounod's Faust (Valentin)
- Leoncavallo's I Pagliacci (Silvio–Tonio)
- Magnard's Bérénice (Titus)
- Massenet's Manon (Lescaut), Griselidis (Le Marquis), Werther (Albert)
- Méhul's Joseph (Simeon)
- Mussorgski's Boris Godunov (Tchelkalov), Khovanshchina (Chaklovity)
- Mozart's Don Giovanni, Le Nozze di Figaro (Conte), Cosi fan Tutte (Gugliemo)
- Offenbach's Barbe-Bleue (Popolani)
- Poulencs Dialogues des Carmélites (Le Marquis), Les Mamelles de Tirésias (Prologue)
- Piccinni's Iphigénie en Tauride (Oreste)
- Puccini's La Boheme (Marcello), Madame Butterfly (Sharpless), Tosca (Scarpia)
- Ravel's L'Heure espagnole (Ramiro, Don Inigo), L'Enfant et les Sortilèges (Le Chat / L’Horloge)
- Respighi's Semiramide (Falasar)
- Rossini's Il Barbiere di Siviglia (Figaro)
- Salieri's Les Danaïdes (Danaüs)
- Tchaïkovski's Eugene Onegin
- Verdi's La Traviata (Germont), Don Carlos (Posa), Un Ballo in Maschera (Renato), Falstaff (Ford), Il Trovatore (Luna), Simon Boccanegra (Simon – Paolo), I Vespri Siciliani (Monforte), Rigoletto, Otello (Iago), Ernani (Don Carlo)
- Wagner's Rienzi (Orsini)

=== Concert ===
- Beethoven's Symphony 9
- Bizet's Clovis et Clothilde (cantata)
- Duruflé's Requiem
- Dvořák, Te Deum
- Fauré's Requiem
- Orff's Carmina Burana

== Recordings ==
=== Audio ===
- Aubert, Manon Lescaut - Marquis d'Hérigny.
- Bellini's La straniera - Valdeburgo.
- Catalani's Dejanice - Dàrdano.
- Chapentier's Louise - 1.cop, 2.philosopher.
- Chausson's Le roi Arthus - Mordred.
- Donizetti's La Favorite - Alphonse XI.
- Gluck's Iphigénie en Aulide - Thoas.
- Halévy's La Juive - Ruggiero.
- Massenet's Werther - Albert.
- Méhul's Joseph - Siméon.
- Piccinni's Iphigénie en Tauride - Oreste.
- Respighi's Semirâma - Falasar.

=== Videos ===
- Adam's Le postillon de Lonjumeau - Bijou.
- Auber's Manon Lescaut - Marquis d'Hérigny.
- Donizetti's La Favorite - Alphonse XI.
- Méhul's Joseph - Siméon.
