= Edgard Doneux =

Belgian conductor

Edgard Doneux (Liège, 25 March 1920 – 31 January 1984, Anderlecht) was a Belgian conductor.

Doneux received his entire musical formation at the conservatoire of his native city, and made his conducting debut at the Opéra Royal de Liège, in 1940, aged only 20.

In 1946, he was named principal conductor at the Monnaie opera house in Brussels, and in 1949 chief conductor at the Belgian Radio-Television, retaining the latter post until his death.

His repertoire at La Monnaie included Fra Diavolo, Si j'étais roi, Carmen, Les contes d'Hoffmann, Hérodiade, Manon, Mignon, Lakmé and La Basoche from the French 19th century repertoire, and Italian works from Lucia di Lammermoor and Norma to late romantic operas such as La Bohème, Cavalleria rusticana, Madame Butterfly, Rigoletto, Suor Angelica and Tosca.

Of lighter works he conducted La Comtesse Maritza, La Térésina, Rêve de valse, La veuve joyeuse and Les cloches de Corneville.

In the 1970s for the ballet company Doneux conducted major full-length ballets such as The Nutcracker, Cinderella, Coppélia and Swan Lake.

He took part in the foundation of the Ballet Royal and l'Opéra Royal de Wallonie, as well as the Festival de Chimay, and was for a time artistic director of the Spa Musical, in Spa, Belgium.

== Selective discography ==
- Ludwig van Beethoven - Violin Concerto, Op.61, with Lola Bobesco (His Master's Voice, 1982)
- André Grétry - Zémire et Azor, (EMI, 1974)
- André Grétry - L'amant jaloux - (EMI, 1977)
- André Grétry - Richard Coeur-de-lion, (EMI, 1977)
- Willem Kersters - " Ulenspiegel de Geus", (EMI, 1976)
- Marcel Poot - Ouverture Joyeuse (1930) (Pathé Marconi EMI, rec 1978)
- Arnold Schoenberg - Fünf Orchesterstücke Op.16 (Pathé Marconi EMI, rec 1978)
- Igor Stravinsky - L'oiseau de feu (Pathé Marconi EMI, rec 1978)
- Paul Uy - Galaxiale, Poème pour synthétiseur et orchestre (with Bernard Foccroulle, synthesizer)(Pathé Marconi EMI, rec 1978)
- Varney - Les mousquetaires au couvent, (EMI, 1979)

== Sources ==
- Dictionnaire des interprètes, Alain Pâris, (Éditions Robert Laffont, 1989) ISBN 2-221-06660-X
