= Deva Dassy =

French opera singer (1911–2016)

Background information
- Born: Marie-Anne Lambert; 26 August 1911; Paris
- Died: 11 March 2016 (aged 104) Mouriès
- Genres: opera
- Instrument: mezzo-soprano
- Years active: 1932-1962

Deva Dassy (born Marie-Anne Lambert; 26 August 1911 – 11 March 2016) was a French mezzo-soprano, active in opera and operetta in France from the 1930s to the 1960s who made many radio and studio recordings.

== Life and career ==
Born Marie-Anne Lambert in Paris, she was the daughter of the radical French politician Charles Lambert (1883–1972) and the pianist Germaine Polack (1878–1952) and had a half-sister Gertrude van Goens, from the previous marriage of her mother with the cellist and composer Daniël van Goens (1858–1904).

She made her debut with her stage name at the Opéra-Comique on 19 February 1932 in Madame Butterfly (Suzouki). She went on to sing major roles in operas such as Werther (Charlotte), Mignon (Mignon), Résurrection (Servant), Gianni Schicchi (Ciesca) and Les voitures versées (Agathe) La Femme nue (l'Infirmière). Among her creations at the Salle Favart were Inès in Frasquita (1932), Violette in Le Roi bossu by Elsa Barraine, a servant in Tarass Boulba.

In 1934 her performances in Nice brought forward the comment that her Charlotte confirmed her early promise to be a star of the French lyric stage, with her warm and sensitive voice. As Mignon, the critic lauded her physical appearance embodying the wild 'bohémienne', with her voice across varied tones. She also appeared there that season as la Navarraise and as Prince Charmant in Cendrillon.

In musical comedy she created roles in Erosine in 1935 (Commère), the title role in Yana in 1936, and in the 'revue opérette' La Féérie blanche in 1937, with Anton Dolin among the cast. After the war she became a frequent participant in the programme of the Service lyrique de l'ORTF making radio broadcasts of light operas, and up to 1963 took part in Rhodope (Ganne) 1962, No, no, Nanette 1954, Dix-neuf ans (Pascal Bastia) 1963 and Lady Poum (Die erste Beste, Oscar Straus) 1963, among others.

She appeared in the film Faut ce qu'il faut (filmed 1940, released 1946, also known as Monsieur Bibi) directed by René Pujol, Ces sacrées vacances (1955) by Robert Vernay, and Toute la ville accuse (1955) by Claude Boissol.

In the 1930s she recorded operetta excerpts from, among others, Deux sous de fleurs, La Dubarry, Fleur d'Hawaï, O mon bel inconnu, Rose de France, Valses de Vienne and Yana. In the 1950s she took part in recordings of longer extracts or complete versions of La Petite Mademoiselle by Messager, Le Coeur et la main by Lecocq (Josefa), Les Mousquetaires au couvent by Varney (Soeur Opportune), Geneviève de Brabant (Isoline), Orphée aux enfers (Junon/Vénus), La Vie parisienne (Métella) and Barbe-Bleue (La Reine Clémentine) and the title role in La belle Hélène by Offenbach. In 1962 she was Militza in François les bas-bleus in a radio recording under Marcel Cariven. She died in Mouriès.

== Family ==
In 1925 she wed Artillery Lieutenant Louis Jean Charles Lallemant (1904–1934) at Fontainebleau (divorced 1932). In 1936 she married François Brunschwig, and had a son Jean-François; they were divorced the same year.

In 1940 she was one of the passengers on the ocean liner the SS Massilia with her partner Georges Mandel which transported members of the defeated French government and their families into exile.
