= Manon Lescaut (Auber) =

1856 opera by Daniel Auber

- Opéra comique by Daniel Auber
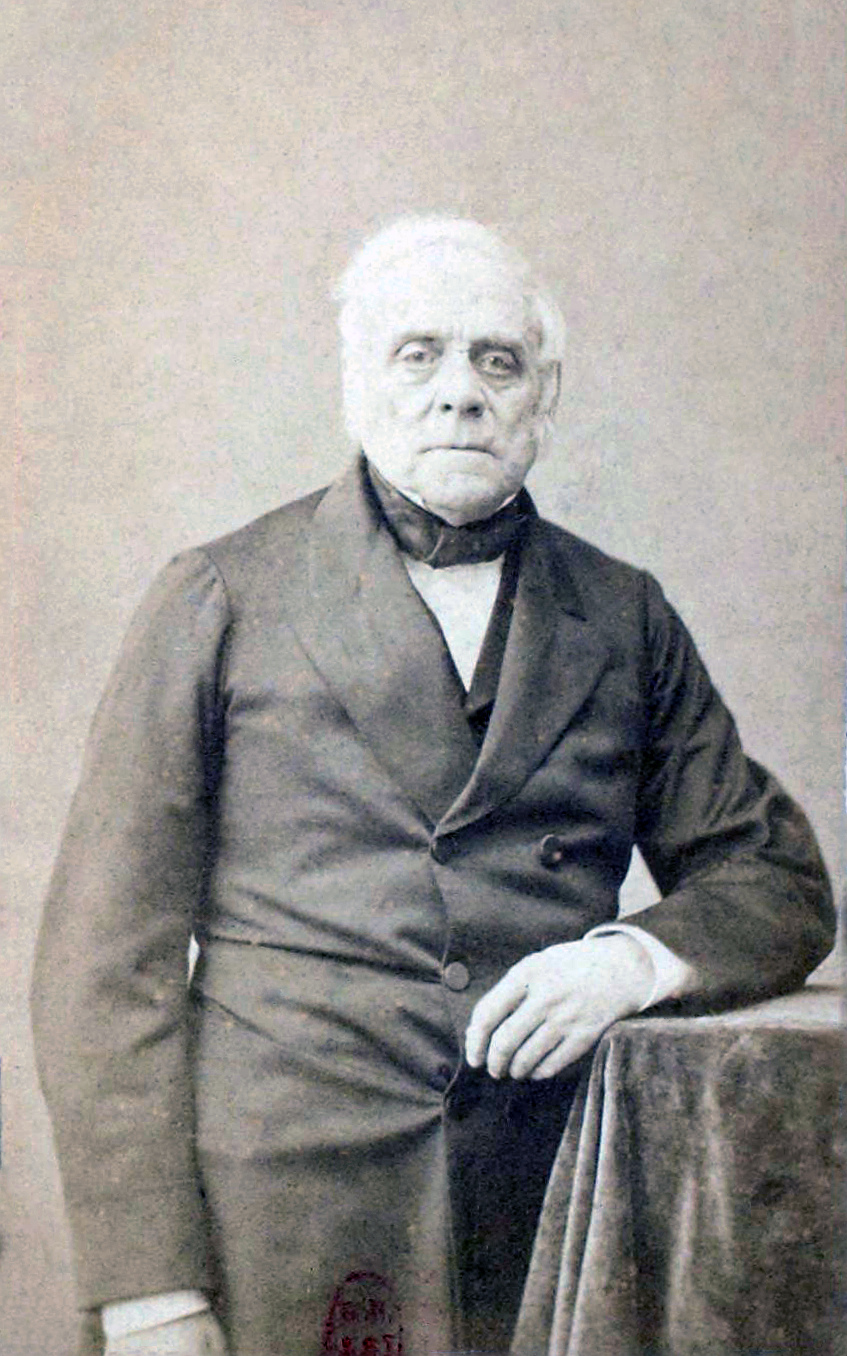
- The composer c. 1860
- Librettist: Eugène Scribe
- Language: French
- Based on: Manon Lescaut by Abbé Prévost
- Premiere: 23 February 1856; Salle Favart, Paris

Manon Lescaut is an opera or opéra comique in three acts by Daniel Auber to a libretto by Eugène Scribe, and, like Puccini's Manon Lescaut and Massenet's Manon, is based on Abbé Prévost's novel Manon Lescaut (1731). Auber's version is nowadays the least performed of the three.

== Performance history ==
The opera was premiered on 23 February 1856 by the Opéra-Comique at the second Salle Favart in Paris. It was the first work to be staged by that company that did not have a happy ending, with the death of the heroine on stage pre-dating Bizet's Carmen of 1875. It was staged in Liège in 1875, revived at the Opéra-Comique in 1882, and regularly performed in Germany as well as France. However, since the dawn of the twentieth century stagings have become something of a rarity.

It was staged at the Teatro Filarmonico, Verona in 1984 with Mariella Devia as Manon. In 1990, a production by the Théâtre Impérial de Compiègne was staged at the Opéra-Comique with the Orchestre Régional de Picardie 'La Sinfonietta' conducted by Patrick Fournillier with Elizabeth Vidal in the title role (her first principal role), Alain Gabriel, René Massis and André Cognet, directed by David Freeman; a video recording of a performance there that September was released by Le Chant du Monde. It was produced at the Wexford Festival in October 2002, conducted by Jean-Luc Tingaud, and featured Ermonela Jaho as Marguerite.

In North America, the opera was performed in 2006 by the Lyric Opera of Los Angeles at the Los Angeles Theatre.

In October 2024, the opera was performed alongside its famous companion pieces by Massenet and Puccini at the Teatro Regio Turin in alternation over 21 days. It was conducted by Guillaume Tourniaire and directed as with the other two operas, by Arnaud Bernard.

== Roles ==
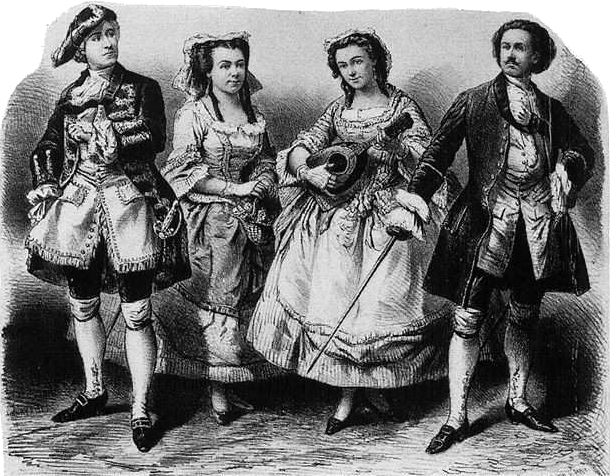
Le marquis d'Hérigny, Manon Lescaut, Marguerite, Des Grieux

Roles, voice types, premiere cast
Role	Voice type	Premiere cast, 23 February 1856 Conductor: Théophile Tilmant
Manon Lescaut	coloratura soprano	Marie Cabel
Des Grieux	tenor	Henri Puget
Le Marquis d'Hérigny	baritone	Jean-Baptiste Faure
Lescaut, Manon's cousin	bass	Beckers
Marguerite, Manon's friend	soprano	Léocadie Lemercier
Gervais, her fiancé	tenor	Jourdan
Madame Bancelin, cabaret hostess	mezzo-soprano	Mme Félix
Monsieur Durozeau, commissaire	baritone	Lemaire
Monsieur Renaud, Inspector	baritone	Nathan
Zaby, a young slave	soprano	Mlle Bélia
A Sergeant	bass	Duvernoy
Two bourgeois		
Court nobles, Bourgeois of the Boulevard du Temple, Soldiers, Male and female workers; Inhabitants of New Orleans, negroes, colonial soldiers

== Synopsis ==
The story only loosely resembles the original novel by Prévost (where, for instance, Lescaut is Manon's brother, not her cousin). There is one character – the Marquis d'Herigny – who represents the several wealthy suitors that Manon became involved with in the novel. Some other characters are absent entirely, and others are completely new to this telling of the story.

== Music ==
The role of Manon Lescaut is a demanding one, with a very high tessitura, extended florid passages and arias of outstanding technical difficulty. Nonetheless, it also presents great opportunities for characterisation and (at least before the appearance of the operas on the same subject by Puccini and Massenet) was one of the staples of the operatic repertoire – not only in France, but also in Germany. The role of the Marquis d'Herigny, written for the famous baritone, Jean-Baptiste Faure, also features several significant solos; but the tenor role of Des Grieux (given two major arias by Massenet and three by Puccini) lacks a major solo, although the character does participate in a series of fine duets, notably at the death of Manon near the end of the opera.

One number in the score has retained its popularity with coloratura sopranos. This is Manon's solo, "C'est l'histoire amoureuse", also known as "L'éclat de rire" or the "Laughing Song". It is not a free-standing aria – in fact, it forms part of the act 1 finale – but ever since its creation it has been a chosen showcase for the technique of singers such as Adelina Patti (who sang it during the lesson scene in The Barber of Seville), Amelita Galli-Curci, Joan Sutherland and Edita Gruberová.

== Recordings ==
- Manon Lescaut – Mady Mesplé, Jean-Claude Orliac, Peter-Christoph Runge, Yves Bisson – Choeurs et orchestre lyrique de Radio France, Jean-Pierre Marty (conductor) – EMI (recorded in October 1974).
- Manon Lescaut – Elizabeth Vidal, Alain Gabriel, René Massis – Les Choeurs du Théâtre Français de la Musique, the Orchestre Régional de Picardie Le Sinfonietta, Patrick Fournillier (conductor) – Le Chant du Monde (recorded live in 1990, released in 1991).
