= Richard Coeur-de-lion (opera) =

1784 opéra comique

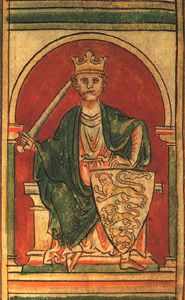
Richard I of England, depicted in a 13th-century manuscript

Richard Cœur-de-lion (French pronunciation: [ʁiʃaʁ kœʁ də ljɔ̃], Richard the Lionheart) is an opéra comique, described as a comédie mise en musique, by the Belgian composer André Grétry. The French text was by Michel-Jean Sedaine. The work is generally recognised as Grétry's masterpiece and one of the most important French opéras comiques. It is based on a legend about King Richard I of England's captivity in Austria and his rescue by the troubadour Blondel de Nesle.

On his way home from the Third Crusade, King Richard has been imprisoned by Leopold, Archduke of Austria. The king's faithful squire Blondel seeks him out disguised as a blind troubadour. He arrives in Linz where he meets the English exile Sir Williams and his daughter Laurette, who tell him of an unknown prisoner in the nearby castle. Laurette is in love with the prison governor, Florestan. Countess Marguerite, who is in love with King Richard, arrives and offers Blondel her help. Blondel goes to the castle where he sings the song Une fièvre brûlante ("A burning fever"). Richard recognises the music and tries to communicate with Blondel, who is seized by the guards, but he is freed when he tells Florestan of an assignation Laurette wants with him the following night. Blondel reveals the truth to Williams and the countess and they plan to free the king. Marguerite holds a party, during which Florestan, who had come to meet Laurette, is held captive. The countess's troops besiege the castle and rescue Richard.

== Performance history ==
First performed in three acts by the Comédie-Italienne at the first Salle Favart in Paris on 21 October 1784, it was described by Frances Anne Crewe as “a more beautifull, and splendid Opera,” than she had ever seen in England. It was unsuccessfully given in a revised four-act version at Fontainebleau on 25 October 1785, and later in Paris on 21 December. A new definitive three-act version was then reworked and mounted at the Comédie-Italienne on 29 December, subsequently entering the Opéra-Comique repertoire. The opera reached the United Kingdom in 1786 where it was performed at Richard Brinsley Sheridan's Drury Lane Theatre, and Boston, USA, in 1797. It was immensely popular and was still being played in France at the end of the 19th century. Being consistently interpreted as a 'royalist' piece, it fell out of public favour during the revolutionary periods and was not billed in Paris in 1791–1806, 1827–1841, 1847–1856. Charlton counts 485 performances in total up to 1827. In 1841 Adolphe Adam provided new orchestration for that year's revival at the Opéra-Comique and through the following decades reached over 600 further performances by that company by 1910. Another 302 were given at the Théâtre Lyrique between 1856 and 1868.

A translated semi-opera version of Sedaine's work Richard Cœur de lion was written by John Burgoyne with music by Thomas Linley the elder for the Drury Lane Theatre where it was very successful in 1788. Another translated version, written by Leonard McNally, was performed at Covent Garden and equally successful.

== The work and its influence ==
Richard Cœur-de-lion played an important role in the development of opéra comique in its treatment of a serious, historical subject. It was also one of the first rescue operas. Significantly, one of the chief characters in the most famous rescue opera of all, Beethoven's Fidelio, is called Florestan, though he is the prisoner not the jailor. Grétry attempted to imitate Medieval music in Blondel's song Une fièvre brûlante and his example would be followed by composers of the Romantic era. (Beethoven wrote a set of piano variations on the song, WoO. 72.) He also used the same melody as a recurring theme, a technique developed by later composers of opéra comique such as Méhul and Cherubini. Through them it would influence the German tradition of Weber and Wagner.

Blondel's aria Ô Richard, ô mon roi! ("Oh Richard, oh my king!") became a popular rallying song amongst royalists during the French Revolution and was banned by the republican government. In Tchaikovsky's opera The Queen of Spades, Laurette's aria "Je crains de lui parler la nuit" is sung by the Countess, remembering her days in 18th century Paris, just before she is frightened and dies from a sudden heart attack.

== Roles ==
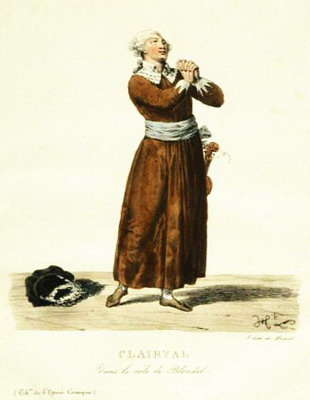
Clairval in the role of Blondel

Role	Voice type	Premiere Cast, October 21, 1784 (Conductor: - )
Richard the Lionheart, King of England	tenor	Philippe Cauvy, 'Philippe'
Blondel, a squire of Richard	tenor	Jean-Baptiste Guignard, 'Clairval'
The seneschal	spoken	Courcelle
Florestan, the governor of the castle of Linz	basse-taille (bass-baritone)	Philippe-Thomas Ménier
Williams	basse-taille (bass-baritone)	Pierre-Marie Narbonne
Mathurin	tenor	
Urbain	basse-taille (bass-baritone)	
Guillot	tenor	
Charles	tenor	
A peasant	basse-taille (bass-baritone)	
Antonio (travesti)	soprano	Rosalie de Saint-Évreux, 'Mlle Rosalie'
Marguerite, Countess of Flanders and Artois	soprano	Marie-Thérèse-Théodore Rombocoli-Riggieri, 'Mlle Colombe l'Aînée'
Laurette, Williams's daughter	soprano	Louise-Rosalie Lefebvre, 'Madame Dugazon'
Béatrix, an attendant of Marguerite	soprano	Angélique Erbennert, 'Mlle Desforges'
Madame Mathurin	soprano	
Colette	soprano	

== Synopsis ==
=== Act 1 ===
Scene: Outside a magnificent home, with a view in the distance of the fortress of Linz.
The energetic, anguished overture depicts the capture of King Richard, en route back to England from the Crusades. We then hear a lively peasant dance, and a handful of peasants fill the stage, excited about the party they'll have tomorrow night: an elderly couple, Mathurin and his wife, will be celebrating their fiftieth wedding anniversary, and they all perform a merry dance. A young boy guides an old blind man onstage; the young fellow is a local, Antonio (sung by a soprano); the man he's leading is Blondel, minstrel and companion to Richard the Lionheart. Blondel has disguised himself as an old blind man as he searches for Richard all over Europe. Antonio describes this location to Blondel, including the grim, forbidding fortress of Linz, which can be seen in the distance. He tells Blondel he can't act as his guide tomorrow, because all the village is going to this big anniversary celebration. Antonio has a crush on a local girl, whom he describes to Blondel in a cheery little song, expressing his regret that Blondel will never see her. Blondel asks Antonio to find someplace for him to sleep that night, and Antonio goes into the nearby mansion.

Left alone onstage, Blondel sings his aria, “O Richard, o mon roi,” asserting his faithful, selfless love for his king, whom all the world has abandoned. This minstrel's love is all fidelity and devotion without any expectation of reward. It becomes clear that Blondel isn't really an old blind man—he's young and full of strength and fire. But he reassumes his former identity when two new characters run onstage: Williams, the short-tempered rich man who owns the mansion that's onstage, and Guillot, servant to Florestan, governor of the nearby fortress. Williams has caught Guillot bringing a love letter from his master, Florestan, to Williams’ daughter Laurette; he chews Guillot out and decries Florestan as a seducer in a comic duet that becomes a quartet when Blondel and Laurette, the young lady in question, add their voices.

Blondel then gets Antonio to read the letter out loud: Florestan wants to come woo Laurette in person, but he can't leave his high-security prisoner alone in the fortress. (Blondel is intrigued by this description of the prisoner.) The minstrel then asks Williams what a Welshman is doing in central Austria? Williams had fought with King Richard's English army in the crusades, but upon returning home, to Wales, he found that his father had been killed while he was away, for poaching a rabbit; so Williams killed the killer and then fled to the continent. “That’s two men killed for a rabbit,” says Blondel. Williams exits, and Blondel then quizzes Laurette, his daughter, about Florestan and his high-security prisoner mentioned in his love-note. She doesn't know anything about the prisoner, but she sings an aria, “Je crains de lui parler la nuit,” describing the passion she feels for Florestan. Blondel then teaches her a song he's written about the blind god of love, and together they turn it into a charming duet.

At this point a great lady arrives with her entourage: it's Marguerite, the Countess of Flanders and Artois, who is staying with Williams. Blondel recognizes her—she's the fiancée of King Richard of England—so he plays on his violin a song composed for Marguerite by Richard. Marguerite is surprised to hear that tune in this remote location and stops to talk with Blondel; “Have mercy on a poor old blind man,” he says, “and grant me shelter for the night.” She agrees—on condition that he entertain them with music. So he repeats the violin tune, this time with orchestral accompaniment. Marguerite's servants offer Blondel a drink, and he leads them in a rousing drinking song, “Que le sultan Saladin.”

=== Act 2 ===
The act begins with an entr’acte detailing the sorrowful plight of the captive King Richard. The curtain goes up and we see a split-stage. On one side there's the prison where Richard the Lionheart is being kept; his room has a fenced-in balcony which looks out on the moat. Opposite it, on the other side of the stage, a forest stretches away into the distance. It's the hour before dawn, and Florestan, the prison governor, allows King Richard one hour to walk the balcony and get some fresh air. Left alone, Richard broods over his fate and sings of his love for Marguerite in the aria, "Si l'univers entier m’oublie." All his glory and fame just make this shameful captivity that much worse.

Antonio brings Blondel through the forest, to the opposite side of the moat. Hoping Richard will hear him, Blondel sings the tune he was playing on the violin in Act 1, now with passionate words describing the pain of love. Richard interrupts, first with dialogue: “I know that voice!” and then he joins in to sing the second verse. Blondel is ecstatic to hear his beloved king sing their song back to him, and baritone and tenor voices mingle sweetly as they sing together. But the rapture of this ideal moment is interrupted when a crowd of soldiers emerges from the fortress; they seize Blondel. He begs them to let him speak with Florestan, and when the prison governor arrives Blondel tells him he brings a message from Laurette, the girl he loves from the village: Florestan should come meet her that night, her father will be distracted by the fiftieth anniversary wedding celebration that he is hosting. Florestan is delighted; he pretends to be gruff and angry, yelling at Blondel in front of his soldiers, but Antonio comes to Blondel's rescue and the act concludes with a lively ensemble for Blondel, Antonio, and the soldiers of the fortress.

=== Act 3 ===
Scene: The mansion of Williams
Blondel insists on speaking with Countess Marguerite. Two of her servants block his way, but after a lively trio with them he pushes his way past. Marguerite is telling Williams of her plans to go join a convent when her servant, Béatrix, brings in Blondel. Blondel gets rid of everybody else and reveals his identity to the surprised Marguerite. King Richard is nearby, he tells her; they must free him that night! Marguerite is traveling with a couple dozen men; in an action-packed ensemble they fill these soldiers in on the situation. A war council follows, in dialogue; one of the soldiers objects that they don't have enough men to storm the fortress, but Blondel's reconnaissance mission that morning discovered a weak spot in the castle wall. Also, he has a plan to get rid of Governor Florestan, which he puts into play when he sings a trio with Williams, the Welshman who owns this house, and his daughter Laurette, who is more than happy to distract Florestan that evening as part of the rescue. Following this lively patter trio, the old couple's fiftieth anniversary party gets going with a jolly, silly peasant song and a dance. Florestan is dancing with Laurette when there's a noise from the fortress. Panicking, Florestan makes as if to return to his duty, but Williams and his men stop him. Trumpets sound a call to arms, and a wild, swirling orchestral passage describes Blondel's attack on the fortress. Galloping rhythms indicate a chase on horseback, and finally we hear men crying “Vive Richard!” Long live King Richard! To the sounds of a victorious march, Blondel brings Richard in to the wedding celebration; Countess Marguerite, overcome, faints. Williams and his men make Florestan kneel before Richard, but the king magnanimously returns his captor's sword. In the midst of the excited ensemble that concludes the opera listen for the sweet trio sung by Richard, Marguerite, and Blondel, saluting the minstrel's faithful love.

== Libretto ==
- Richard Cœur-de-lion (French Wikisource)
- 1786 libretto online at Google Books
- 1787 libretto online at the Library of Congress
- 1841 libretto online at the Internet Archive

== Recordings ==
There are three recordings of the three-act version:

- Orchestre de Chambre de la Radio-Télévision Belge, conducted by Edgard Doneux, with Charles Burles, Michel Trempont, Jacqueline Sternotte, Danièle Perriers, Mady Mesplé, Ludovic de San, Monique Bost, Nicole Dukens, Jean van Gorp, Jules Bastin, and Jean Bussard (EMI Classics/Angel Records CD: B000063XQN, recorded 16–26 May 1977);
- Orchestra giovanile Conservatorio "Claudio Monteverdi" di Bolzano, and Coro lirico "Gretry", conducted by Fabio Neri, with Hubert Zingerle, Peter Edelmann, Marinella Pennicchi, Barbara Pichler, Mattia Nicolini, Flavia Bernardi, Kurt Pircher, Silvia Wieser, Ulrike Malsiner, Georg Zingerle, Armin Kolarczyz; Kurt Pircher; Georg Zingerle; Gotthard Bonell; Maria Pia Zanetti; Gabriella Cacciatori; Monica Trettel; Paolo Florio, and Leandro Pegoretti (Nuova Era, 7157/7158; CD digitaler; recorded 6–9 August 1990, at the Haus der Kultur in Bolzano)
- Le Concert Spirituel Orchestra and Chorus, conducted by Hervé Niquet, with Reinoud van Mechelen, Marie Perbost, Melody Louledjian, Enguerrand de Hys, and Geoffrey Buffière (Château de Versailles Spectacles, CVS028, released 2020)

== Sources ==
- (in Italian) Richard Coeur de Lion by Raffaele Mellace, in Dizionario dell'opera 2008, eds. Piero Gelli and Filippo Poletti (Milan, Baldini Castoldi Dalai, 2007) (reproduced online at Operamanager.com, accessed 27 May 2014)
- (in Italian) Casaglia, Gherardo (2005). "21 October 1784". L'Almanacco di Gherardo Casaglia (in Italian).
- Richard Cœur-de-lion by David Charlton, in 'The New Grove Dictionary of Opera', ed. Stanley Sadie (London, 1992) ISBN 0-333-73432-7
- Charlton, David, Grétry and the Growth of Opéra-Comique, Cambridge, Cambridge University Press 1986 (paperback edition cited: 2010, ISBN 978-0-521-15881-7)
- Booklet notes to the Doneux recording by Michel Parouty
- Article in The Viking Opera Guide ed. Holden (1993)
- The Oxford Illustrated History of Opera ed. Roger Parker (OUP, 1994)
- (in French) Campardon, Émile (ed), Les Comédiens du roi de la troupe italienne pendant les deux derniers siècles: documents inédits recueillis aux Archives Nationales, Paris, Berger-Levrault, 1880 (accessible for free online at Internet Archive: Volume I (A-L); Volume II (M-Z))
