= Fontainebleau Schools =

The Fontainebleau Schools were founded in 1921, and consist of two schools: The American Conservatory, and the School of Fine Arts at Fontainebleau.

== History ==
When the American Expeditionary Forces entered the First World War, the commander of its army, General Pershing, decided the quality of US military band music needed improvement. Walter Damrosch, then conductor of the New York Philharmonic, was asked to organize a school in Chaumont, where US troops were headquartered, led by composer and teacher Francis Casadesus.

== The American Conservatory ==
The conservatory was created during World War I when the US sought to build a music school to improve the U.S. military bands, headquartered in France.

After the war, Damrosch and Casadesus decided to continue this successful operation. With the full support of French authorities, as well as that of composer and organist Charles-Marie Widor, who became its first director, the American Conservatory, was granted permission to open in the Louis XV wing of the Chateau of Fontainebleau. The American Conservatory (Fr. Conservatoire américain de Fontainebleau) intended to offer the best of French musical education to young, promising musicians.

Since 1921, the teaching staff has included renowned faculty such as: the trio Pasquier, Maurice Ravel, Camille Saint-Saëns, Marcel Dupré, Robert and Gaby Casadesus, Charles-Marie Widor, Henri Dutilleux, Gilbert Amy, Betsy Jolas, André Boucourechliev, Pierre Amoyal, Sviatoslav Richter, Mstislav Rostropovitch, Igor Stravinsky, Arthur Rubinstein, Tristan Murail and Leonard Bernstein.

Nadia Boulanger, a young composition/harmony professor, was among this distinguished faculty from the beginning. Her energy, knowledge, and her spirit guided the school until 1979. Her close friend Isidor Philipp headed the piano departments of both the Paris Conservatory and the American Conservatory. His renown in the US helped bring many American composers. After director Narcís Bonet, current director presiding over the school is Diana Ligeti.

Under such guidance, the American Conservatory influenced many of the best American musicians such as: Elliott Carter, Kenton Coe, Aaron Copland, Samuel Dushkin, Roy Harris, Kenneth Lampl, Dee Libbey, Helen Roessing, Louise Talma, Virgil Thomson, Beveridge Webster, and many others.

For a full history of the school, see Leonard, Kendra. The Conservatoire Americain: a History, Lanham, Md: Scarecrow Press, 2007

== School of Fine Arts at Fontainebleau ==
The School of Fine Arts at Fontainebleau (Fr, École des Beaux-Arts at Fontainebleau), was founded in 1923 due to a desire, largely by American Beaux-Arts alumni, to re-establish cultural and artistic ties between France and America after the First World War. It was an expansion of the Conservatoire Américain (American Conservatory), established in the Fontainebleau Chateau in 1921. The School of Fine Arts provided programs in painting, sculpture, and architecture, and architecture flourished with its inspiration from the historic architecture in the region.

The school was temporarily closed in 1939 due to the start of the Second World War.

Its faculty has included prestigious international names in architecture, including B. Doshi, Sheila Hicks, Paolo Soleri, and Juan Nakpil.

Past directors of the school are Jacques Carlu, A. Remondet, P. Devinoy, Bernard de la Tour d'Auvergne, Marion Tournon-Branly, and J.L. Nouvian.
