= Daniël van Goens =

French cellist and composer

Daniël François van Goens (born Leiden, 3 September 1858 – died Paris, 10 May 1904) was a French cellist and composer of Dutch descent.

== Early life ==
He was the son of preacher François Corneille Jean van Goens (born in The Hague) and Angela Margaretha Charbon (born in Amsterdam). They would have about ten children, with seven passing away from tuberculosis. He married pianist Germaine Polack, who was twenty years younger than him. She remarried Charles Lambert after his death and they had daughter Marie-Anne Lambert, the late mezzo-soprano Deva Dassy.

He moved to France in his youth; his parents settled because of the climate in Montpellier, Van Goens was already there on the concert stage. The family later moved to Lausanne and in 1879 returned to Paris. Only one of his brothers remained in France, the late architect Jean Henri van Goens.

== Career ==
In Paris Van Goens took cello lessons from Leon Jacquard and composition from Albert Lavignac at the local conservatory. He left his law studies for music. In July 1883 he took a Premier Prix. He came to the Netherlands only rarely afterwards, but gave a concert in Leiden and Groningen (1890). In France, however, he was a celebrated musician. He had poor health, was sick in the last years of his life and had to occasionally divert to the clean air in Switzerland. He had to cancel more and more concerts (performing with his wife) and lost the ability to play the cello. He continued to compose.

== Works ==
He also wrote some forty works, including an Adagio, works for cello and orchestra (All 'Ungaresse) and piano pieces. The chamber music pieces were designated as salon music.

- opus 1 - Two pieces for cello and piano (Reverie & Mazourka) (Schlesinger, 1885)
- opus 2 - Adagio in G for cello and piano (Haslinger, 1886)
- opus 5 - Aria & Gavotte for cello and piano (Haslinger, 1887)
- opus 6 - Nocturne (A. O'Kelly, ca.1888)
- opus 7 - Cello Concerto No. 1 in a minor (Decourcelle, 1899) (second part was also performed separately as Larghetto)
- opus 9 - Nocturne & Mazurka for piano (Grus pub, ca.1892)
- opus 10- Elegie for cello and piano
- opus 12- Two pieces for cello and piano (Paris: Hamelle, 1895) (no.1: Romance, no.2: Scherzo)
- opus 13- Gavotte "Irda" for piano (Cello ad lib.) (Durand, ca.1893?)
- opus 15- Two pieces for violin and piano (Hamelle, ca.1895) (no. 2: All'ungarese)
- opus 17- Two pieces for cello and piano (nr.1: Largo, nr.2 - Gavotte)
- opus 18- Polonaise the concert for cello and piano
- opus 19- La Brise, barcarolle for cello and piano
- opus 20- Second Mazurka for cello and piano (Durand, ca.1893)
- opus 21- Prelude for violin or cello and piano (Durand, ca.1893)
- opus 22- Berçeuse for violin or cello and piano (Durand, ca.1893)
- opus 23- Valse de Concert for cello and piano
- opus 24- Tarentelle nr.1 in a minor (pub.1895 / 6, E. Baudoux)
- opus 25- Danse Villageoise (Souvenir de Locronan) for cello and piano
- opus 26- Aux Bords du Loing, melody for cello and piano
- opus 27- Feuillet d'album, berceuse for cello and piano (pub Hamelle, 1900)
- opus 30- Cello Concerto No. 2 in D minor
- opus 31- Third Mazurka (C major) for cello and piano (pub Hamelle, 1900)
- opus 34- Cantabile for cello and piano (pub.1899)
- opus 35- Saltarello for cello and piano (pub D. Rahter, 1899)
- opus 36- Invocation for cello and piano
- opus 38- Valse Pittoresque for cello and piano
- opus 39- Two pieces for cello and piano (no.1: Navy, no. 2: Minuet)
- opus 44- Tarentelle No. 2 in D
- opus 45- Chant élégiaque for cello and piano or organ (pub London: Schott, 1904)
- opus 46- Berceuse for cello and piano

In the period between 1896 and 1908 five works by Van Goens landed on the lecterns of the Royal Concertgebouw:

- On 1 March 1896 Johan C. Hock played the Romance, opus 1 conducted by Willem Mengelberg
- On 28 October 1900 Leon H. Meerloo was heard in the Cello Concerto No. 1
- On 19 September 1901 Isaäc Mossel played the Scherzo under the direction of Mengelberg, with a replay on 28 March 1903 in The Hague.
- On 13 October 1973, Frits Gaillard played the Cellconcert no. 1, again under the direction of Mengelberg.
