= George B. Mead =

American conductor and organist

George B. Mead was an American conductor, organist, and opera translator. He was organist and choirmaster of Trinity Church in Manhattan for 27 years. The New York Times stated that, "In the 1940's and 50's, Dr. Mead was one of the most celebrated choral conductors in New York City."

== Life and career ==
Born in Manhattan, Mead graduated from Columbia University with a bachelor's degree (1923) and a master's degree (1925). He was assistant organist at Trinity Church in Manhattan from 1925 to 1936, before he served as organist at Central Congregational Church in Brooklyn from 1936 through 1941. In 1941 he returned to Trinity Church to serve as organist and choirmaster; a role he remained in until his retirement in 1968. During this time, he led the choir in their own weekly radio program.

In collaboration with his wife, Phyllis Reid, Mead co-authored many English language translations of foreign language opera libretti; among them translations of Ariadne auf Naxos, Cavalleria Rusticana, Così fan tutte, Die Entführung aus dem Serail, Il turco in Italia, Martha, Rita, The Barber of Seville, The Gypsy Baron, and Pagliacci. Their English language libretti were used for performances by several institutions, including the Metropolitan Opera, the New York City Opera, the Juilliard School, the Mannes College of Music and the Little Orchestra Society. Nine of their translations were published in A Treasury of Grand Opera by Simon & Schuster in 1946 and again in 1965.
