= Toulouse Regional Conservatory =

French conservatory

The Toulouse Regional Conservatory is a state-run arts college in Toulouse, Haute-Garonne, France. Represented by the Direction régionale des Affaires culturelles (DRAC), it offers specialist education in music, choreography and drama.

== History ==
Founded on March 13, 1820, the Toulouse School of Music became a branch of the Paris Conservatoire in 1840.

From 1866 until 1993, the school was located on rue Labéda (site of today's Théâtre de la Cité, no. 4), after which it moved to the former Hôpital Larrey, where it remains today.

== Partnerships ==
In partnership with the French Ministry of Education, the Conservatoire is part of a cycle of classes à horaires aménagés. Elementary schools Lakanal (music and dance) and Rangueil (choral singing), collège Michelet (instrument, voice and dance) and lycée Saint-Sernin all take part in this program.
