= Les saltimbanques =

French opera

- Opéra-comique by Louis Ganne
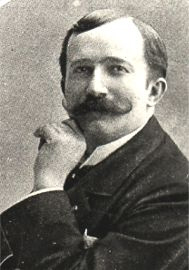
- The composer c. 1900
- Translation: The Acrobats
- Librettist: Maurice Ordonneau
- Language: French
- Premiere: 30 December 1899; Théâtre de la Gaîté, Paris

Les saltimbanques (The Acrobats) is an opéra-comique in three acts, libretto by Maurice Ordonneau, music by Louis Ganne, first performed at the Théâtre de la Gaîté, Paris, on 30 December 1899. In the third act a ballet entitled Les Bohemiennes was danced by Julia Duval, Briant, the women of the corps de ballet and a troupe of acrobats, Les Manzoni.

== Roles ==
Role	Voice type	Premiere cast, 30 December 1899 (Conductor: Perpignan)
Suzanne	soprano	Jeanne Saulier
Marion	soprano	Lyse Berty
Paillasse	tenor	Paul Fugère
Madame Bernandin		Jane Evans
Grand Pingouin	baritone	Lucien Noel
André de Langeac	baritone	Etienne Perrin
Malicorne	baritone	Vauthier
Comte des Etiquettes		Bernard
Bernandin		Dacheux
Le baron de Valengoujon		Jallier
Saltimbinques

== Synopsis ==
Suzanne was abandoned as a child and taken in by Malicorne, director of a circus. She is friend with Paillasse (who loves her), Grand-Pingouin (who is also attracted to her), and Marion (who is Grand-Pingouin's lover). Suzanne is pursued by soldiers but rescued by a young officer, André, and the attraction between them is immediate. The brutal Malicorne abuses Suzanne one time too many, and she escapes with Paillasse, Grand-Pingouin, and Marion.

Suzanne and her friends have formed a little troupe called "Les Gigoletti". They are invited to perform at the Castle of the Count des Étiquettes, who is André's uncle. However, Malicorne happens to be there as well, recognises them and wants them arrested on the pretext they own him money. The Count pays the sum just as André arrives.

Suzanne sings a song she has learned in childhood, which is in fact a song the Count has composed and that nobody knows. From this song, it is discovered that she is his long lost daughter. Being of high birth, she and André can be married, but she also feels sorrow that she will be leaving her friends.

== Discography ==
- Les saltimbanques – Mady Mesplé, Éliane Lublin, Raymond Amade, Dominique Tirmont, Claude Calès, Jean-Christophe Benoît – Choeurs René Duclos, Orchestre de l'Association des Concerts Lamoureux, Jean-Pierre Marty – EMI Classics, 1968.
- Les saltimbanques – Janine Micheau, Michel Roux, Robert Massard, Geneviève Moizan – Orchestra, Pierre Dervaux – Accord 465868-2
- Les saltimbanques (abridged) – Liliane Berton, Claude Devos, Freda Betti, Lucien Lovano, Guy Godin, Pierre Germain – Raymond Saint Paul Choirs and Orchestra conducted by Jules Gressier, Recorded at the Théâtre des Champs-Élysées, Paris, April 1953, Pathé (DTX 30.141)

== Sources ==
- Le guide de l'opéra, R. Mancini & J.J. Rouveroux, (Fayard, 1986) ISBN 2-213-01563-5
- Pristine Classical, https://www.pristineclassical.com/products/paco031
