= Louis Varney =

French composer (1844–1908)

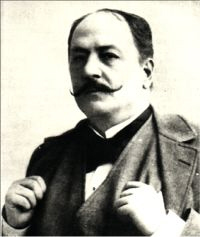
Louis Varney (1844–1908)

Louis Varney (French: [vaʁnɛ]; 30 May 1844, New Orleans, Louisiana – 20 August 1908, Cauterets, France) was a French composer.

== Biography ==
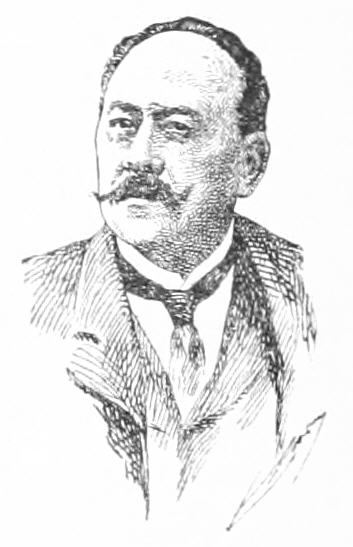

Louis Varney was the son of Alphonse Varney, a French conductor at the Bouffes-Parisiens and at the Grand Théâtre de Bordeaux, he was also invited to conduct the "French Opera Season" abroad, notably in New Orleans, Louisiana, and this is how Louis came to be born there in 1844.

He studied music with his father, and became first a conductor like him. He was conducting in a small theatre L'Athénée-Comique, while he began composing, he succeeded in having one of his work, Il signor Pulcinella presented there in 1876 with considerable success. He was then proposed by the director of the Bouffes-Parisiens, Louis Cantin, to write an operetta on a libretto by Paul Ferrier and Jules Prével, based on a comédie en vaudeville by St-Hilaire and Dupont from 1835, entitled L'habit ne fait pas le moine. Louis accepted and under a new title Les mousquetaires au couvent, it premiered at the Bouffes-Parisiens on 16 March 1880, and the success was absolute.

Varney went on writing some forty operettas, all of them noted for their musical elegance and good taste, sometimes closer in style to opéra-comique, amongst the most notable are; Fanfan la tulipe (1882), Babolin (1884), Les petits mousquetaires (1885), L'âge d'or (1905), all very popular in their time, some were even presented abroad, but nowadays all but forgotten.

Les mousquetaires au couvent is the only one to have survived total oblivion, and is still occasionally presented in France.

== Operettas ==
- Il signor Pulcinella (1876 Paris)
- Les mousquetaires au couvent (1880 Paris)
- La reine des Halles (1881 Paris)
- Coquelicot (1882 Paris)
- La petite reinette (1882 Brussels)
- Fanfan la tulipe (1882 Paris)
- Babolin (1884 Paris)
- Joséphine (1884 Trouville)
- Les petits mousquetaires (1885 Paris)
- L'amour mouillé (1887 Paris)
- Dix jours aux Pyrénées (1887 Paris)
- Divorcée (1888 Cabourg)
- La Japonaise (1888 Paris)
- La Vénus d'Arles (1889 Paris)
- La fée aux chèvres (1890 Paris)
- La fille de Fanchon la vielleuse (1891 Paris)
- La femme de Narcisse (1892 Paris)
- Le brillant Achille (1892 Paris)
- Miss Robinson (1892 Paris)
- Cliquette (1893 Paris)
- Les forains (1894 Paris)
- La fille de Paillasse (1894 Paris)
- Les petites Brebis (1895 Paris)
- La belle épicière (1895 Paris)
- La falote (1896 Paris)
- Le papa de Francine (1896 Paris)
- Le pompier de service (1897 Paris)
- Pour sa couronne (1897 Paris)
- Les demoiselles des Saint-Cyriens (1898 Paris)
- La tour de bois (1898 Paris)
- Les petites Barnett (1898 Paris)
- La fiancée de Thylda (1900 Paris)
- Frégolinette (1900 Paris)
- Mademoiselle George (1900 Paris)
- Princesse Bébé (1902 Paris)
- Le chien du régiment (1902 Paris)
- L'âge d'or (1905 Paris)

== Sources ==
- Le guide de l'opéra, les indispensables de la musique, R. Mancini & J-J. Rouvereux, (Fayard, 1986) ISBN 2-213-01563-5
- Opera Glass
