= Mady Mesplé =

French soprano opera singer (1931–2020)

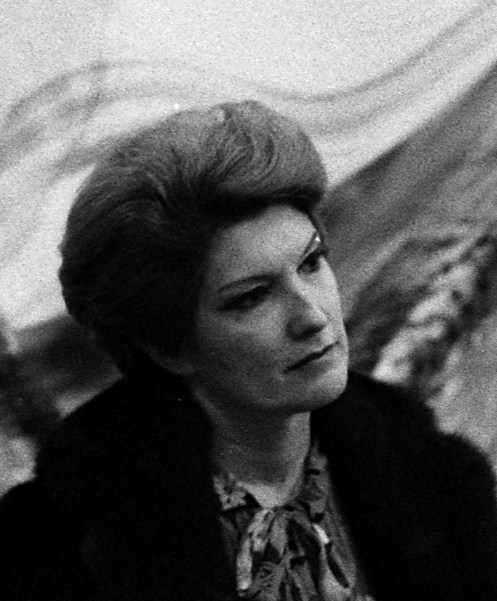
- Mesplé in 1975
- Born: Madeleine Mesplé; 7 March 1931; Toulouse, France
- Died: 30 May 2020 (aged 89); Toulouse, France
- Occupation: Operatic coloratura soprano
- Years active: 1953–1985
- Awards: Legion of Honour; Ordre national du Mérite

Mady Mesplé (7 March 1931 – 30 May 2020) was a French opera singer who was considered the leading coloratura soprano of her generation in France, and sometimes heralded as the successor to Mado Robin, with Lakmé by Delibes becoming her signature role internationally.

She sang professionally for more than thirty years, with a repertoire that ranged from operetta to contemporary works. After retiring from the stage, she started teaching. Mesplé was the archetype of a light coloratura soprano: technically secure, musically distinctive, and with a charming stage presence. When she developed Parkinson's disease in the mid-1990s, she responded by writing a book about her career and the development of her illness.

== Biography ==
Born Madeleine Mesplé in Toulouse on 7 March 1931, she came from a modest family background. Her father Pierre was an accountant and her mother Yvonne (Sesquiere) a secretary. She took up music at the age of four, and her mother's recognition of her promise, confirmed by a teacher, led her to attend the Toulouse Regional Conservatory from the age of seven. She studied piano and voice, graduating with a gold medal. She played the piano in a local ballroom orchestra for a while and later left for Paris for complementary voice lessons with French soprano Janine Micheau.

Mesplé made her professional debut in Liège in January 1953, in the title role of Lakmé by Delibes, a role with which she remained closely associated throughout her career, singing it an estimated 145 times. Lakmé was also her debut role at La Monnaie in Brussels in 1954. She quickly established herself in the standard lyric and coloratura roles of the French repertoire, such as Olympia in The Tales of Hoffmann, Philline in Mignon, Leila in Les pêcheurs de perles, Juliette in Roméo et Juliette, Ophélie in Hamlet, the title roles of Dinorah and Manon, and Sophie in Werther.

She made her debut at the Aix-en-Provence Festival in 1956, as Zémire in Grétry's Zémire et Azor. The same year she first sang at the Opéra-Comique, again as Lakmé. Her Palais Garnier debut took place in 1958, as Constance in Poulenc's Dialogues des Carmélites. There in 1960, she took over from Joan Sutherland in a new production of Donizetti's Lucia di Lammermoor. Other Italian roles included Amina in Bellini's La sonnambula, Rosina in Rossini's Il barbiere di Siviglia, Norina in Donizetti's Don Pasquale and Gilda in Verdi's Rigoletto. She sang only a few German roles: the Queen of the Night in Mozart's Die Zauberflöte, Sophie in Der Rosenkavalier, and Zerbinetta in Ariadne auf Naxos, both by Richard Strauss.

Mesplé also enjoyed a successful career abroad, appearing at the Bolshoi Theatre in Moscow, the Royal Opera House in London, La Scala in Milan, the Metropolitan Opera in New York, where she appeared as Gilda, and Teatro Colón in Buenos Aires, where she sang the role of Olympia.

During the 1960s, Mesplé appeared frequently on French television and started exploring works by contemporary musicians. Charles Chaynes composed his Four Poems of Sappho for her, and in 1963 she appeared as Kitty in the French premiere of Gian Carlo Menotti's The Last Savage. She was also the first to sing the French version of Henze's Elegy for Young Lovers in 1965, and Pierre Boulez chose Mesplé for his performances of Schoenberg's Jacob's Ladder.

During the 1970s she added operettas to her repertoire, especially by Jacques Offenbach, such as La Vie parisienne, Orphée aux enfers and La Grande-Duchesse de Gérolstein, opposite Régine Crespin.

Mesplé retired from the stage in 1985 and turned to teaching at the École Normale de Musique de Paris and at the Music Conservatory of Lyon. After her retirement, she continued to perform recitals until the early 1990s.

Mesplé left a discography encompassing opera, operetta, and mélodies, including complete opera and operetta recordings of rarely performed works such as Auber's Fra Diavolo and Manon Lescaut, Lecocq's La fille de Madame Angot, Planquette's Les cloches de Corneville, Ganne's Les saltimbanques, Messager's Véronique, and Hahn's Ciboulette. She recorded Lakmé, alongside Charles Burles and Roger Soyer, conducted by Alain Lombard.

The archetype of the light French coloratura soprano, Mady Mesplé was noted for her technical security, musical refinement and charming stage presence. Her voice was particularly recognisable for its quick vibrato, intensely focused intonation, the instrumental-like quality of her runs and an amazing upper register extending easily to high A-flat. The French baritone Ludovic Tézier tweeted after her death: "Mady Mesplé s'est envolée, légère comme l'élégance". ("Mady Mesplé has flown away, lightly as elegance".)

In the mid-1990s, Mesplé began suffering from Parkinson's disease, leading her to work closely with the "Association France Parkinson" and to write a book, entitled La Voix du Corps (The Voice of the Body), about her career and the development of her illness. She died on 30 May 2020 in her native Toulouse.

== Awards ==
- 2001: Officier of the Legion of Honour
- 2009: Grand Officier of the Ordre national du Mérite
- 2011: Commandeur of the Legion of Honour
- 2011: Prize in honorem from the Académie Charles-Cros for her entire career
- 2015: Grand Officier of the Legion of Honour
- 2019: Grand Cross of the Ordre national du Mérite
