= Jean-Pierre Marty =

French pianist and conductor (1932–2024)

Jean-Pierre Marty (12 October 1932 – 14 March 2024) was a French pianist and conductor.

== Biography ==
Jean-Pierre Marty was born on 12 October 1932. He was first a pupil of Alfred Cortot, then of Julius Katchen. He started a piano career at the age of 13, first serving as accompanist to the cellist Pierre Fournier for a few months before appearing in Paris as soloist in three piano concertos. He also studied harmony, counterpoint and composition with Nadia Boulanger whom he eventually succeeded as Director of the American Conservatory in Fontainebleau. He pursued his pianistic career in France, Spain, the Netherlands and Germany until it was interrupted by serious muscular problems in 1953.

Having moved to the United States, he shifted to conducting, taking lessons from Robert Irving and Thomas Schippers and appearing first in ballet (New York City Ballet, American Ballet Theatre), then in opera (New York City Opera, Washington Opera). On his return to France, he was for seven years Music Director of the Opera Season of the French Radio while pursuing his career both in the operatic and symphonic fields in Europe and in the Americas. He realized many recordings for EMI, France and the French Radio label; his recording of Poulenc's Dialogues des Carmélites with Régine Crespin was particularly acclaimed.

His interest in the piano never ceased, and he kept giving piano concerts. His recordings of the piano works of Schumann from Opp. 1 to 32 (8 CDs) were published, receiving a warm reception.

Marty wrote three books: The tempo indications of Mozart, written in English and published by Yale University Press both in the United States and the United Kingdom and, in French, Twenty-four lessons with Chopin and The piano method of Chopin.

Marty died in Paris on 14 March 2024, at the age of 91.

== Recordings ==
- Brahms: Hungarian Dances, Book II, original version for piano 4-hands, with Julius Katchen
- 1968 – Louis Ganne: Les saltimbanques – EMI
- 1970 – Offenbach: La belle Hélène – EMI
- 1974 – Rossini: The Barber of Seville — EMI
- 1974 – Auber: Manon Lescaut – EMI
- 1976 – Poulenc: La voix humaine

== Sources ==
- Dictionnaire des interprètes, Alain Pâris, (Éditions Robert Laffont, 1989) ISBN 2-221-06660-X
